= 1647 =

1647 in various calendars
- Gregorian calendar: 1647; MDCXLVII
- Ab urbe condita: 2400
- Armenian calendar: 1096; ԹՎ ՌՂԶ
- Assyrian calendar: 6397
- Balinese saka calendar: 1568–1569
- Bengali calendar: 1053–1054
- Berber calendar: 2597
- English Regnal year: 22 Cha. 1 – 23 Cha. 1
- Buddhist calendar: 2191
- Burmese calendar: 1009
- Byzantine calendar: 7155–7156
- Chinese calendar: 丙戌年 (Fire Dog); 4344 or 4137 — to — 丁亥年 (Fire Pig); 4345 or 4138
- Coptic calendar: 1363–1364
- Discordian calendar: 2813
- Ethiopian calendar: 1639–1640
- Hebrew calendar: 5407–5408
- Hindu calendars
- Vikram Samvat: 1703–1704
- Shaka Samvat: 1568–1569
- Kali Yuga: 4747–4748
- Holocene calendar: 11647
- Igbo calendar: 647–648
- Iranian calendar: 1025–1026
- Islamic calendar: 1056–1057
- Japanese calendar: Shōhō 4 (正保４年)
- Javanese calendar: 1568–1569
- Julian calendar: Gregorian minus 10 days
- Korean calendar: 3980
- Minguo calendar: 265 before ROC 民前265年
- Nanakshahi calendar: 179
- Thai solar calendar: 2189–2190
- Tibetan calendar: མེ་ཕོ་ཁྱི་ལོ་ (male Fire-Dog); 1773 or 1392 or 620 — to — མེ་མོ་ཕག་ལོ་ (female Fire-Boar); 1774 or 1393 or 621

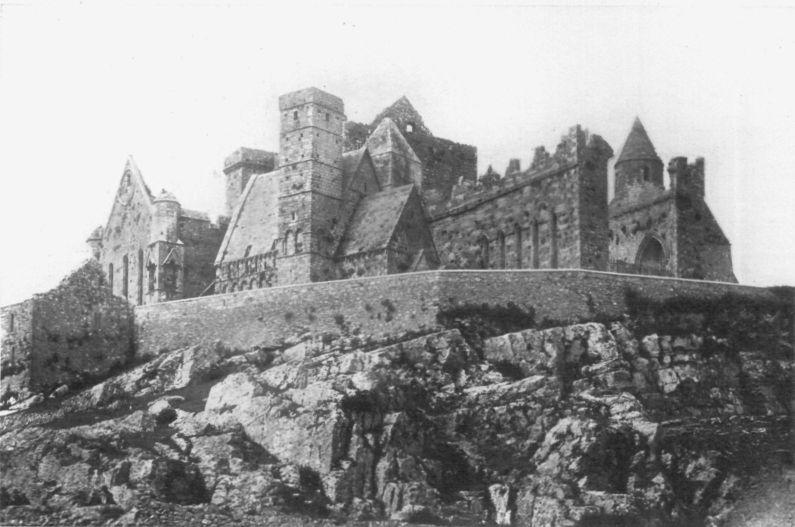
November 13: Battle of Knocknanuss takes place in Ireland.

1647 (MDCXLVII) was a common year starting on Tuesday of the Gregorian calendar and a common year starting on Friday of the Julian calendar, the 1647th year of the Common Era (CE) and Anno Domini (AD) designations, the 647th year of the 2nd millennium, the 47th year of the 17th century, and the 8th year of the 1640s decade. As of the start of 1647, the Gregorian calendar was 10 days ahead of the Julian calendar, which remained in localized use until 1923.

== Events ==
=== January–March ===
- January 2 – Chinese bandit leader Zhang Xianzhong, who has ruled the Sichuan province since 1644, is killed at Xichong by a Qing archer, after having been betrayed by one of his officers, Liu Jinzhong.
- January 7 – The Westminster Assembly begins debating the biblical proof texts, to support the new Confession of Faith.
- January 16 – Citizens of Dublin declare their support for Rinuccini, and refuse to support the army of the Marquis of Ormond.
- January 17 – Posten Norge is founded as Postvesenet.
- January 20 – A small Qing force led by Li Chengdong captures Guangzhou and kills the Zhu Yuyue, the Shaowu Emperor of the Southern Ming dynasty in China.
- February 5 – The Yongli era is proclaimed as Zhu Youlang is declared the Yongli Emperor of the Southern Ming.
- February 24 – Thomas Bushell surrenders the Bristol Channel island of Lundy, the last remaining Royalist territory of England, to the Parliamentarians.
- March 14 – Thirty Years' War: Bavaria, Cologne, France and Sweden sign the Truce of Ulm.
- March – Following the Treaty of Ulm that removed Bavaria from the Thirty Years War, the Bavarian troops' commander, Holy Roman Imperial General Johann von Werth, defies Maximilian I, Elector of Bavaria, and von Werth attempts to move the Bavarian troops out of Bavaria and into Austria to come under Imperial jurisdiction. The troops refuse, and von Werth flees to Austria.

=== April–June ===
- April 3 – In England, a letter from the Agitators of the New Model Army, protesting delay of pay, is read in the House of Commons.
- May 13 – The 1647 Santiago earthquake rattles Chile.
- May 24 – The Marquis of Argyll and David Leslie join forces to defeat Alasdair MacColla, at Rhunahoarine Point in Kintyre. MacColla flees to Ireland; his followers are massacred.
- June 6 – Michael Jones, named Governor of Dublin by England's Parliamentarians, lands with 2,000 troops and begins the expulsion of Catholics and the arrest of Protestant royalists.
- June 8 – The Puritan rulers of England's Long Parliament pass the "Ordinance for abolishing all Holidays, and appointing other Days for Sports and Recreations for Scholars, Apprentices, and Servants, in their Room", confirming abolition of the feasts of Christmas, Easter and Whitsun, though making the second Tuesday in each month a secular holiday. The Act declares "Forasmuch as the Feasts of the Nativity of Christ, Easter, and Whitsuntide, and other Festivals, commonly called Holidays, have heretofore been superstitiously used and observed; be it ordained, That the said Feasts and Festivals be no loner observed within England and Wales."
- June 10 – The Battle of Puerto de Cavite begins in the Spanish Philippines when an armada of 12 large warships from the Dutch Republic sails into Manila Bay, with cannon fire hitting many of the roofs of the city. The Spanish defending fleet drives off the Dutch after a two day battle.
- June 16 – Ferdinand IV, King of the Romans, is crowned as the King of Hungary and Croatia at Pressburg (now Bratislava, Slovakia)
- June 19 – The Duke of Ormond, the royalist governor of Dublin, concludes a treaty with the English Commonwealth's Earl of Anglesey, handing over control of Dublin to the Commonwealth in return for the English promise to protect the interests of royalists, both Protestant and Roman Catholic, who had not joined in the Irish Rebellion.
- June 25 – The "Remonstrance of The Army" is presented to the English parliament by former Royal Army supporters of King Charles I, pledging their loyalty to the new English Commonwealth.

=== July–September ===
- July 7 – Masaniello launches rebellion in Naples against Spanish rule.
- July 27 – A mob invades both Houses of the English Parliament at Westminster, and forces the Speakers of the House of Commons and the House of Lords to flee, along with other MPs and Peers.
- August 5 – The New Model Army marches into London, "fulfilling the worst nightmares of Presbyterian MPs," and restores the members of Parliament who were deposed on July 27.
- August 8 – Battle of Dungan's Hill: Irish forces are defeated by English Parliamentary forces.
- August 17 – Peter Stuyvesant is appointed Director of New Netherlands, the Dutch colony in what is later the U.S. state of New York, by the Dutch West India Company to replace Willem Kieft, who departs New Amsterdam on the ship Princess Amelia.
- August 22 – Battle of Triebl: Imperial forces defeat the Swedes in a surprise attack in Bohemia.
- September 27 – The Dutch merchant ship Princess Amelia runs aground off of the coast of Mumbles Point, Wales and sinks, killing 86 of the 107 people aboard, including former New Netherlands Governor Willem Kieft.

=== October–December ===
- October 28 – The Putney Debates, a series of discussions between officers of the New Model Army following Parliament's military defeat of the absolutist monarchy of King Charles, begin at the St. Mary's Church, Putney about what form of government would replace the monarchy in the new republican Commonwealth of England.
- November 13 – Battle of Knocknanuss: An Irish confederate force is destroyed by the army of Parliament; Alasdair MacColla is killed.
- November 15 – Henry of Guise lands in Naples, to become the leader of the Neapolitan Republic.
- December 28 – King Charles of England promises a church reform. This agreement leads to the Second English Civil War.

=== Date unknown ===
- Aberystwyth Castle in Wales, a former Royalist stronghold, is razed to the ground after "a battery of cannon erected on the top of Pendinas hill by Cromwell" and the Parliamentarian troops.
- The word Geysir is first used in Iceland, by Bishop Sveinsson.
- Dutch artist Salomon van Ruysdael completes the oil painting, The Crossing at Nijmegen.

== Births ==
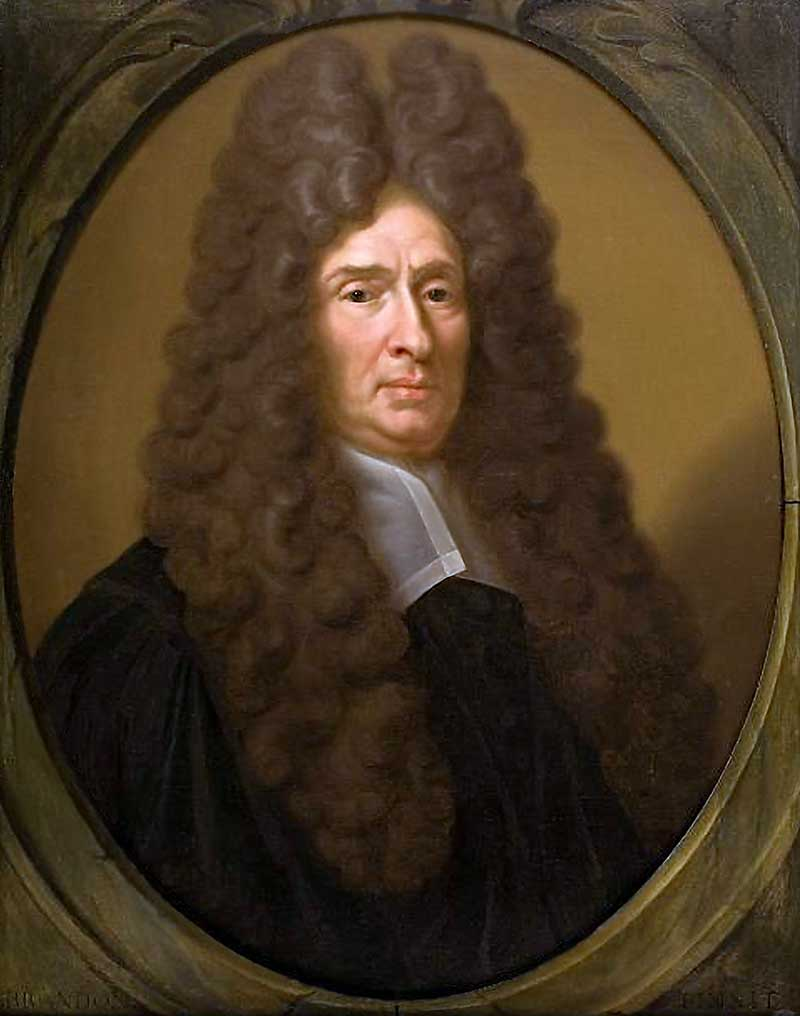
Philipp Reinhard Vitriarius

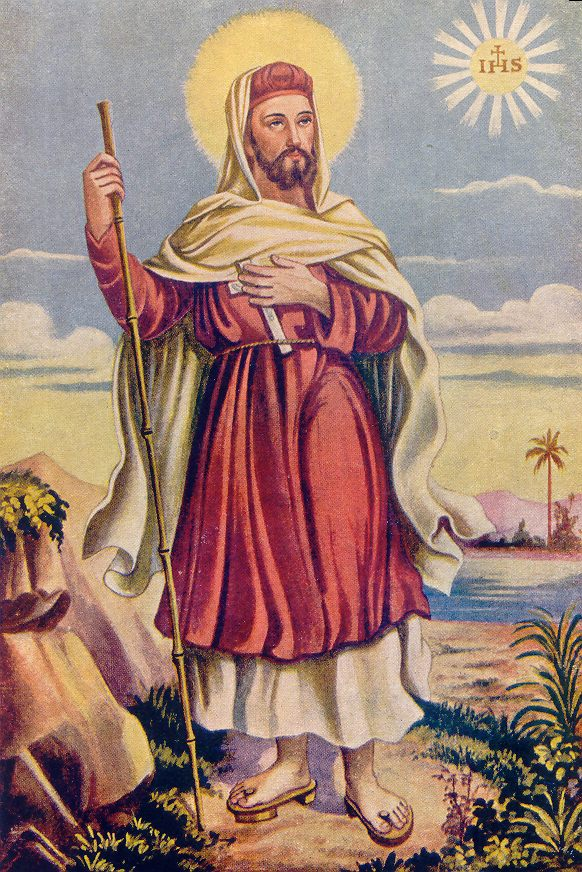
John de Brito

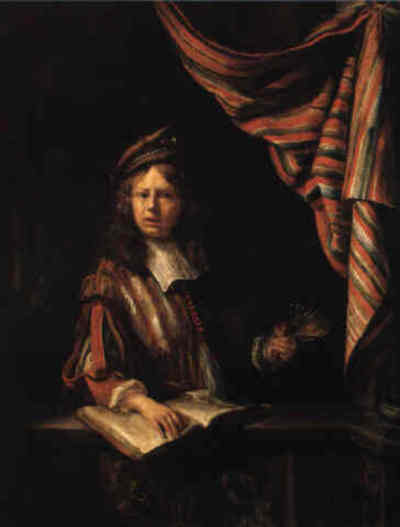
Matthijs Naiveu

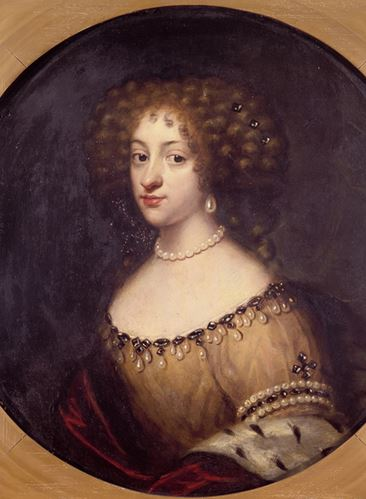
Princess Anna Sophie of Denmark

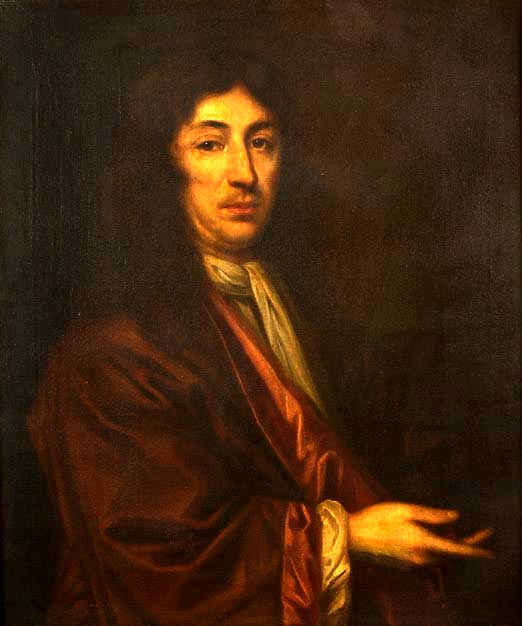
Joseph Dudley

=== January–March ===
- January 2 – Nathaniel Bacon, Virginia colonist, rebel (d. 1676)
- January 6
  - Christian William I, Prince of Schwarzburg-Sondershausen (1666–1720) (d. 1721)
  - William Wall, English theologian (d. 1728)
- January 7 – Wilhelm Ludwig, Duke of Württemberg (d. 1677)
- February 11 – Elisabeth Charlotte of Anhalt-Harzgerode, by marriage Duchess of Schleswig-Holstein-Sonderburg-Plön-Norburg (d. 1723)
- February 17
  - William Hay, Scottish clergyman and prelate (d. 1707)
  - Philipp Reinhard Vitriarius, German lawyer (d. 1720)
- February 18 – Denis-Nicolas Le Nourry, French Benedictine scholar (d. 1724)
- March 1 – John de Brito, Portuguese Jesuit missionary and martyr (d. 1693)
- March 12 – Victor-Maurice, comte de Broglie, French soldier and general (d. 1727)
- March 17 – Johann Wolfgang Jäger, German theologian (d. 1720)
- March 19 – Anna Elisabeth of Anhalt-Bernburg, duchess consort of Württemberg-Bernstadt (d. 1680)
- March 20 – Jean de Hautefeuille, French cleric, scientist (d. 1724)

=== April–June ===
- April 1 – John Wilmot, 2nd Earl of Rochester, English poet and courtier of King Charles II's Restoration court (d. 1680)
- April 2 – Maria Sibylla Merian, German-born naturalist and scientific illustrator (d. 1717)
- April 3 – Sir Thomas Littleton, 3rd Baronet, English statesman (d. 1709)
- April 16 – Matthijs Naiveu, Dutch painter (d. 1726)
- April 18 – Elias Brenner, Finnish artist (d. 1717)
- April 26 – William Ashhurst, Lord Mayor of London (1693–1694) (d. 1720)
- May 20 – Basilius Petritz, German composer and Kreuzkirche (d. 1715)
- June 3 – Johanna Walpurgis of Leiningen-Westerburg, German noblewoman, by marriage Duchess of Saxe-Weissenfels (d. 1687)
- June 17 – James Kendall, English soldier, politician (d. 1708)
- June 19 – Miles Gale, English antiquarian (d. 1721)
- June 20 – John George III, Elector of Saxony (d. 1691)
- June 22 – Ivan Ratkaj, Croatian Jesuit missionary and explorer (d. 1683)

=== July–September ===
- July 2 – Daniel Finch, 2nd Earl of Nottingham, English privy councillor (d. 1730)
- July 8 – Frances Stewart, Duchess of Richmond, member of the Court of the Restoration, famous for refusing to become a mistress of Charles II of England (d. 1702)
- July 22 – Margaret Mary Alacoque, French Catholic nun, mystic and saint (d. 1690)
- July 23 – Luise Marie of the Palatinate, German princess (d. 1679)
- July 29 – Carl Piper, Swedish politician (d. 1716)
- August 4 – Giovanni II Cornaro, Venetian nobleman and statesman (d. 1722)
- August 12
  - Johann Heinrich Acker, German writer (d. 1719)
  - Eberhard Werner Happel, German author (d. 1690)
- August 22 – Denis Papin, French inventor (d. 1713)
- August 28 – Erik Carlsson Sjöblad, Swedish governor, admiral, and baron (d. 1725)
- August 31 – Mary Scott, 3rd Countess of Buccleuch, young Scottish peeress (d. 1661)
- September 1 – Princess Anna Sophie of Denmark, daughter of King Frederick III of Denmark (d. 1717)
- September 4 – Gerhard Noodt, Dutch jurist (d. 1725)
- September 23
  - Joseph Dudley, colonial Governor of Massachusetts (d. 1720)
  - Frederick VII, Margrave of Baden-Durlach from 1677 until his death (d. 1709)

=== October–December ===
- October 3 – Johannes Voet, Dutch legal scholar (d. 1713)
- November 11
  - Johann Wilhelm Baier, German theologian (d. 1695)
  - Johannes Voorhout, Dutch painter (d. 1723)
- November 18 – Pierre Bayle, French philosopher (d. 1706)
- November 20 – Huchtenburg, Dutch painter (d. 1733)
- November 26 – Marie Hedwig of Hesse-Darmstadt, Duchess consort of Saxe-Meiningen (1671–1680) (d. 1680)
- November 27 – Badr-un-Nissa, daughter of Mughal emperor Aurangzeb and Nawab Bai (d. 1670)
- November 28 – Constantin Marselis, Danish baron (d. 1699)
- December 4 – Daniel Eberlin, German composer (d. 1715)
- December 7
  - Giovanni Ceva, Italian mathematician (d. 1734)
  - Francesco del Giudice, Italian Catholic cardinal (d. 1725)
- December 11
  - Jacob Johan Hastfer, Swedish officer, governor of Livonia (d. 1695)
  - David van der Plas, Dutch painter (d. 1704)
- December 22 – Nicholas Noyes, Massachusetts colonial minister, during the time of the Salem witch trials (d. 1717)
- December 30 – Jean Martianay, French Benedictine scholar (d. 1717)

=== Date unknown ===
- Henry Aldrich, English theologian and philosopher (d. 1710)
- Constantine Phaulkon, Greek adventurer (d. 1688)
- Elisabeth Hevelius, Polish astronomer (d. 1693)

== Deaths ==
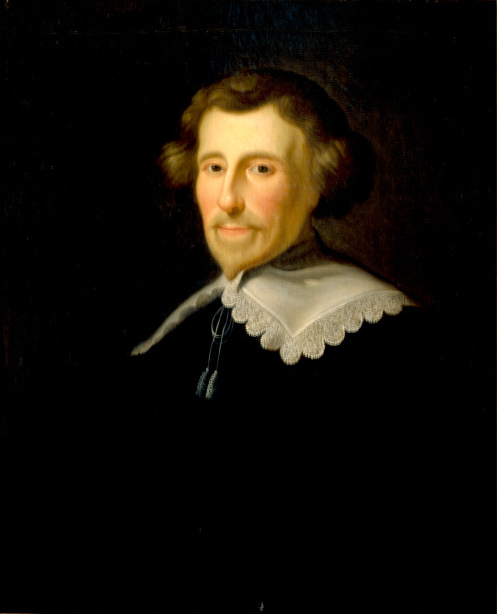
P.C. Hooft

Nicholas Stone

- January 2 – Zhang Xianzhong, Chinese rebel (b. 1606)
- January 6 – Francisco Ximénez de Urrea, Spanish historian (b. 1589)
- January 14 – François L’Anglois, French artist (b. 1589)
- January 29 – Francis Meres, English writer (b. 1565)
- February 6 – Juan Alfonso Enríquez de Cabrera, Viceroy of Sicily and Viceroy of Naples (b. 1599)
- February 17 – Johann Heermann, German poet, hymn-writer (b. 1585)
- March 2 – Johanna Elisabeth of Nassau-Hadamar, by marriage Princess of Anhalt-Harzgerode (b. 1619)
- March 14 – Frederick Henry, Prince of Orange (b. 1584)
- March 29 – Charles Butler, English beekeeper and philologist (b. 1560)
- April 20 – Sir John Hobart, 2nd Baronet, English politician (b. 1593)
- May 21 – Pieter Corneliszoon Hooft, Dutch poet and historian (b. 1581)
- June 2 – Christian, Prince-Elect of Denmark (b. 1603)
- June 9 – Leonard Calvert, Colonial governor of Maryland (b. 1606)
- June 12 – Thomas Farnaby, English grammarian (b. c. 1575)
- July 1 – Francis Walsingham, English Jesuit (b. 1577)
- July 7 – Thomas Hooker, Connecticut colonist (b. 1586)
- July 12 – Francesco Maria Farnese, Italian Catholic cardinal (b. 1619)
- July 16 – Masaniello, Italian rebel (b. 1622)
- August 24 – Nicholas Stone, English sculptor and architect (b. 1586)
- August 27 – Pietro Novelli, Italian painter (b. 1603)
- September 9 – Sir Edward Osborne, 1st Baronet, English politician (b. 1596)
- September 18 – Pietro Carrera, Italian chess player (b. 1573)
- October 8 – Christian Sørensen Longomontanus, Danish astronomer (b. 1562)
- October 9 – Anselm Casimir Wambold von Umstadt, Archbishop of Mainz (b. 1582)
- October 15 – Bartholda van Swieten, Dutch diplomat (b. 1566)
- October 25 – Evangelista Torricelli, Italian mathematician and physicist (b. 1608)
- November 5 – Vincentio Reinieri, Italian mathematician and astronomer (b. 1606)
- November 25 – George Albert I, Count of Erbach-Schönberg (b. 1597)
- November 30
  - Bonaventura Cavalieri, Italian mathematician (b. 1598)
  - Giovanni Lanfranco, Italian painter (b. 1582)
- December 1 – Joseph Gaultier de la Vallette, French astronomer (b. 1564)
