= 1589 =

1589 in various calendars
- Gregorian calendar: 1589; MDLXXXIX
- Ab urbe condita: 2342
- Armenian calendar: 1038; ԹՎ ՌԼԸ
- Assyrian calendar: 6339
- Balinese saka calendar: 1510–1511
- Bengali calendar: 995–996
- Berber calendar: 2539
- English Regnal year: 31 Eliz. 1 – 32 Eliz. 1
- Buddhist calendar: 2133
- Burmese calendar: 951
- Byzantine calendar: 7097–7098
- Chinese calendar: 戊子年 (Earth Rat); 4286 or 4079 — to — 己丑年 (Earth Ox); 4287 or 4080
- Coptic calendar: 1305–1306
- Discordian calendar: 2755
- Ethiopian calendar: 1581–1582
- Hebrew calendar: 5349–5350
- Hindu calendars
- Vikram Samvat: 1645–1646
- Shaka Samvat: 1510–1511
- Kali Yuga: 4689–4690
- Holocene calendar: 11589
- Igbo calendar: 589–590
- Iranian calendar: 967–968
- Islamic calendar: 997–998
- Japanese calendar: Tenshō 17 (天正１７年)
- Javanese calendar: 1509–1510
- Julian calendar: Gregorian minus 10 days
- Korean calendar: 3922
- Minguo calendar: 323 before ROC 民前323年
- Nanakshahi calendar: 121
- Thai solar calendar: 2131–2132
- Tibetan calendar: ས་ཕོ་བྱི་བ་ལོ་ (male Earth-Rat); 1715 or 1334 or 562 — to — ས་མོ་གླང་ལོ་ (female Earth-Ox); 1716 or 1335 or 563

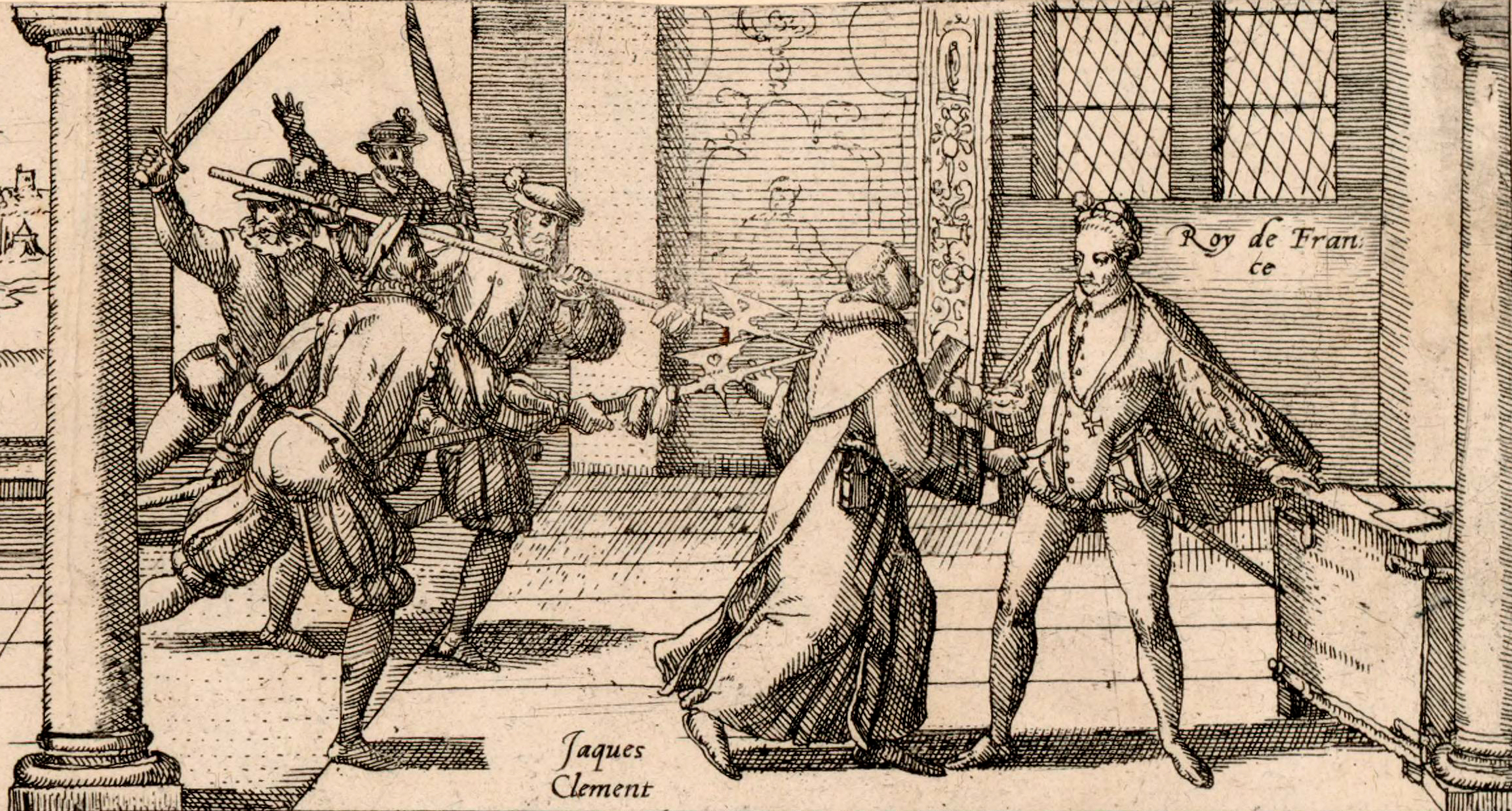
August 1: King Henry III of France is assassinated by friar Jacques Clément

1589 (MDLXXXIX) was a common year starting on Sunday of the Gregorian calendar and a common year starting on Wednesday of the Julian calendar, the 1589th year of the Common Era (CE) and Anno Domini (AD) designations, the 589th year of the 2nd millennium, the 89th year of the 16th century, and the 10th and last year of the 1580s decade. As of the start of 1589, the Gregorian calendar was 10 days ahead of the Julian calendar, which remained in localized use until 1923.

== Events ==
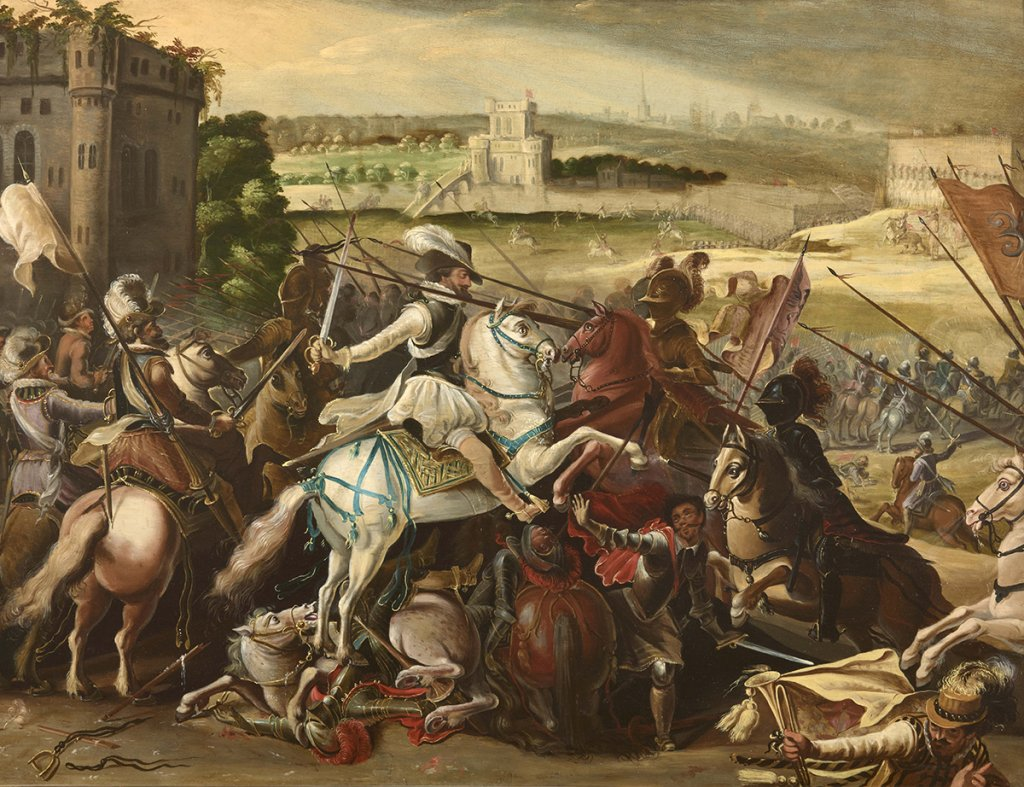
September 15–September 18: Battle of Arques

=== January–March ===
- January 5 – The reign of Catherine de' Medici as Countess of Auvergne ends after 64 years and she is succeeded by her grandson, Charles de Valois.
- January 7 – The College of Sorbonne votes a resolution that it is just and necessary to depose King Henry III of France, and that any private citizen is morally free to commit regicide.
- January 17 – The French city of Chartres closes its gates to King Henry III and subsequently recognizes 65-year-old Charles I, Cardinal de Bourbon as King Charles X.
- January 26 – Job of Moscow is elected as the first Patriarch of Moscow and All Russia.
- February 6 – King Philip of Portugal issues an order to the Viceroy in Portuguese India (Goa) for the arrest of explorer João da Gama, but da Gama continues toward Mexico without being aware of the order.
- February 26 – Valkendorfs Kollegium is founded in Copenhagen, Denmark.
- March 6
  - Ralph Fitch becomes the first known person from England to set foot on the island of Ceylon (now Sri Lanka) and stays five days.
  - The Admiralty of the Noorderkwartier is set up as the third of the five admiralties in the Dutch Republic.
- March 8 – England prohibits the construction of a cottage on any property that isn't at least four acres in size, with the passage of the Erection of Cottages Act 1588.
- March 9 – The Treaty of Bytom and Będzin is signed between the Polish–Lithuanian Commonwealth and Austria, ending the War of the Polish Succession. Maximilian III, Archduke of Austria, renounces his claims to the thrones of Poland and Lithuania and acknowledges Sigismund III Vasa of Sweden as the heir to the throne.

=== April–June ===
- April 13 – An English Armada, led by Sir Francis Drake and Sir John Norreys, and largely financed by private investors, sets sail to attack the Iberian Peninsula's Atlantic coast, but fails to achieve any naval advantage.
- May 2 – Girolamo Bargagli's play The Pilgrim Woman is given its first performance, premiering in Florence, three years after Bargagli's death.
- May 4 – In Spain, María Pita leads the defense of La Coruña against the English Armada after her husband is killed by a crossbow."
- May 11 – The Earl of Bothwell, accused of treason against the Crown of Scotland, surrenders along with the Earl of Huntly and is imprisoned at Holyrood Palace. Convicted on May 24, the conspirators are never sentenced and set free by King James VI.
- May 17 – Ercole Grimaldi becomes the new Lord of Monaco upon the death of his older brother Charles II.
- June 28 – On the island of Sumatra in what is now Indonesia, the Sultan of Aceh Darussalam, Ali Ri'ayat Syah II, is assassinated by a group of nobles dissatisfied with his rule. He becomes the fourth Sultan in a row to be murdered. Sayyid al-Mukammal is approved by the nobles as the new Sultan of Aceh.

=== July–September ===
- July 1 – The English Armada, commanded by Sir Francis Drake, returns to Portsmouth after almost three months of pillaging the Spanish kingdoms.
- July 4 – Jeremias II Tranos is appointed as the Patriarch of Constantinople, leader of the Eastern Orthodox Church, by Ottoman Sultan Murad III.
- July 8 – Jan Zamoyski, the Hetman of Poland since 1581, establishes the largest family trust in the Kingdom. The Zamoyski family trust will last for more than 350 years until being abolished in 1944.
- July 17 – (Tensho 17, 5th day of 6th month); The Battle of Suriagehara takes place in Japan between the Date and Katakura clans and the Ashina, Satake and Nikaido clans. Date Masamune leads the two clans to victory over Satake Yoshinobu.
- July 23 – Abbas the Great, who has recently become the Safavid Emperor of Persia, arranges the assassination of his benefactor, the Viceroy Murshid Qoli Khan at a banquet.
- August 1 – King Henry III of France is assassinated by a fanatical Dominican friar Jacques Clément, who approaches the King on the pretext of delivering a secret message. Henry tells his guards to stand aside, and Clément approaches and fatally stabs the King. Clément is subsequently killed by the guards. King Henry dies the next day.
- August 2 – Following the death of Henry III of France, his army is thrown into confusion and an attempt to retake Paris is abandoned. Henry of Navarre succeeds to the throne as King Henry IV of France, but is not recognized by the Catholic League, who acclaim the imprisoned Charles, Cardinal de Bourbon, as the rightful King of France, Charles X.
- August 20 – King James VI of Scotland, the future James I of England, contracts a proxy marriage with the 14-year-old Anne of Denmark at Kronborg. The formal ceremony takes place on November 23 at the Old Bishop's Palace in Oslo.
- September 21 – Battle of Arques: King Henry IV of France's forces defeat those of the Catholic League, under Charles of Lorraine, Duke of Mayenne (younger brother of Henry I, Duke of Guise).

=== October–December ===
- October 22 – King James VI of Scotland sails to Norway to meet his bride, Anne of Denmark as part of a fleet of six Scottish Navy ships, and is accompanied by Lord Maitland of Thirlestane, the Lord Chancellor of Scotland.
- October 26 – Japanese warlord Date Masamune and his forces capture the Sukagawa Castle, defended by his aunt Onamihime Nikaido, after her assistant Hodohara Yukifuji betrays her.
- October 31 – Alleged serial killer and accused werewolf Peter Stumpp 'the Werewolf of Bedburg' is tortured and executed.
- November 1 – Henry IV of France is repulsed in an attempt to capture Paris from the Catholic League.
- November 21 – At Oslo, Patrick Vans, Lord Barnbarroch ratifies the marriage contract between King James VI of Scotland, and Anne of Denmark.
- December 10 – In India, Man Singh I becomes the new raja of the Kingdom of Amber (now part of the Rajasthan state) upon the death of his father, Bhagwant Das.
- December 25 (Christmas Day) – The monks of the Pechenga Monastery, the northernmost in the world, are massacred by Swedes, led by a Finnish peasant chief, in the course of the Russo-Swedish War.

=== Date unknown ===
- San Luigi dei Francesi, Rome, is completed by Domenico Fontana.
- Hiroshima is founded, by the Japanese warlord Mōri Terumoto.
- The Hofbräuhaus is founded, by William V, Duke of Bavaria, in Munich.

== Births ==
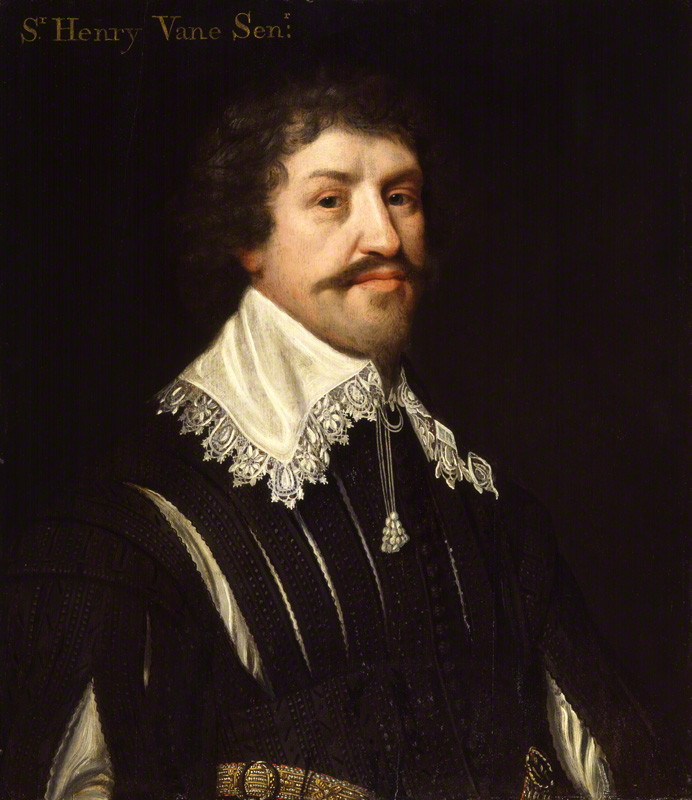
Henry Vane the Elder

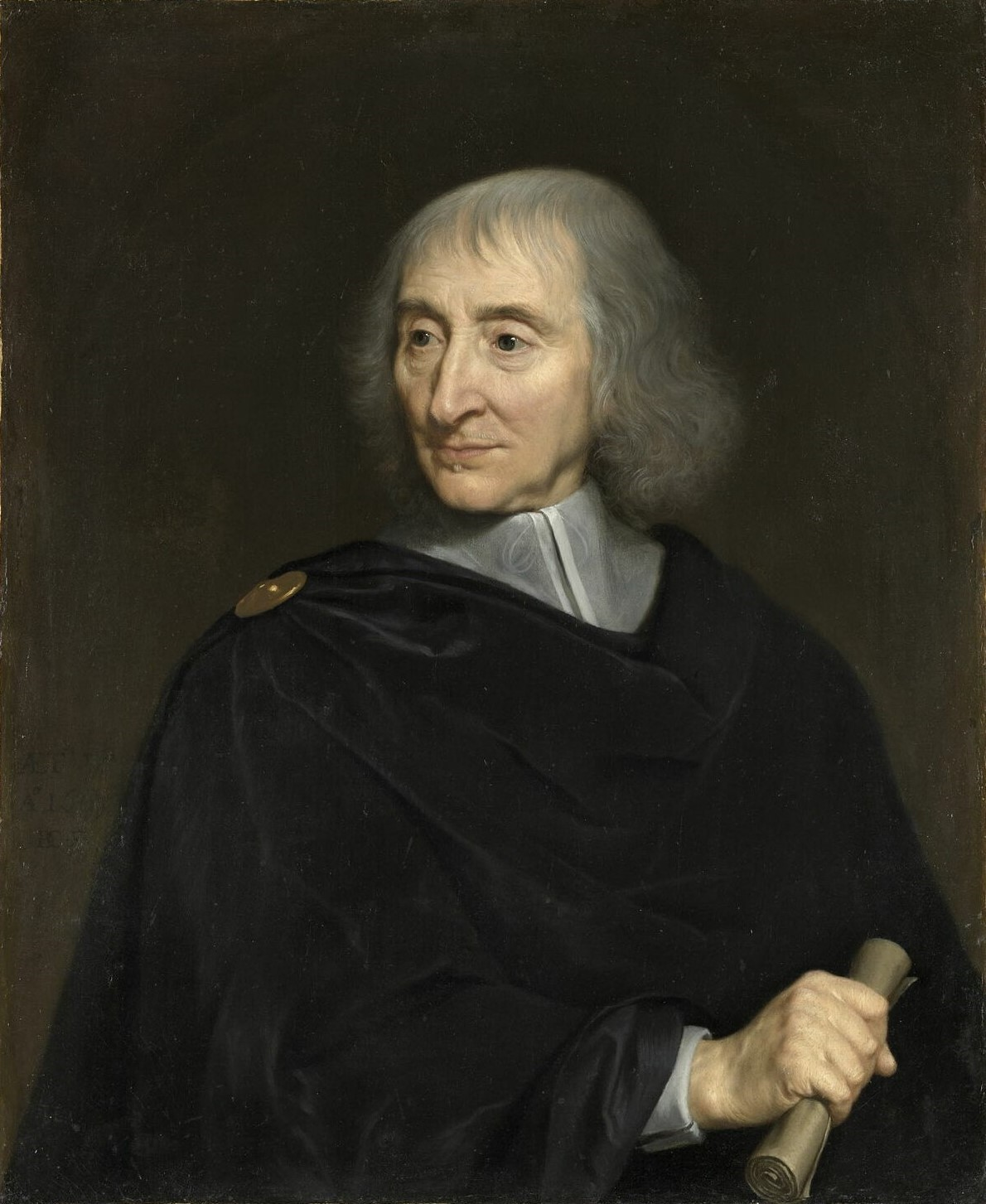
Robert Arnauld d'Andilly

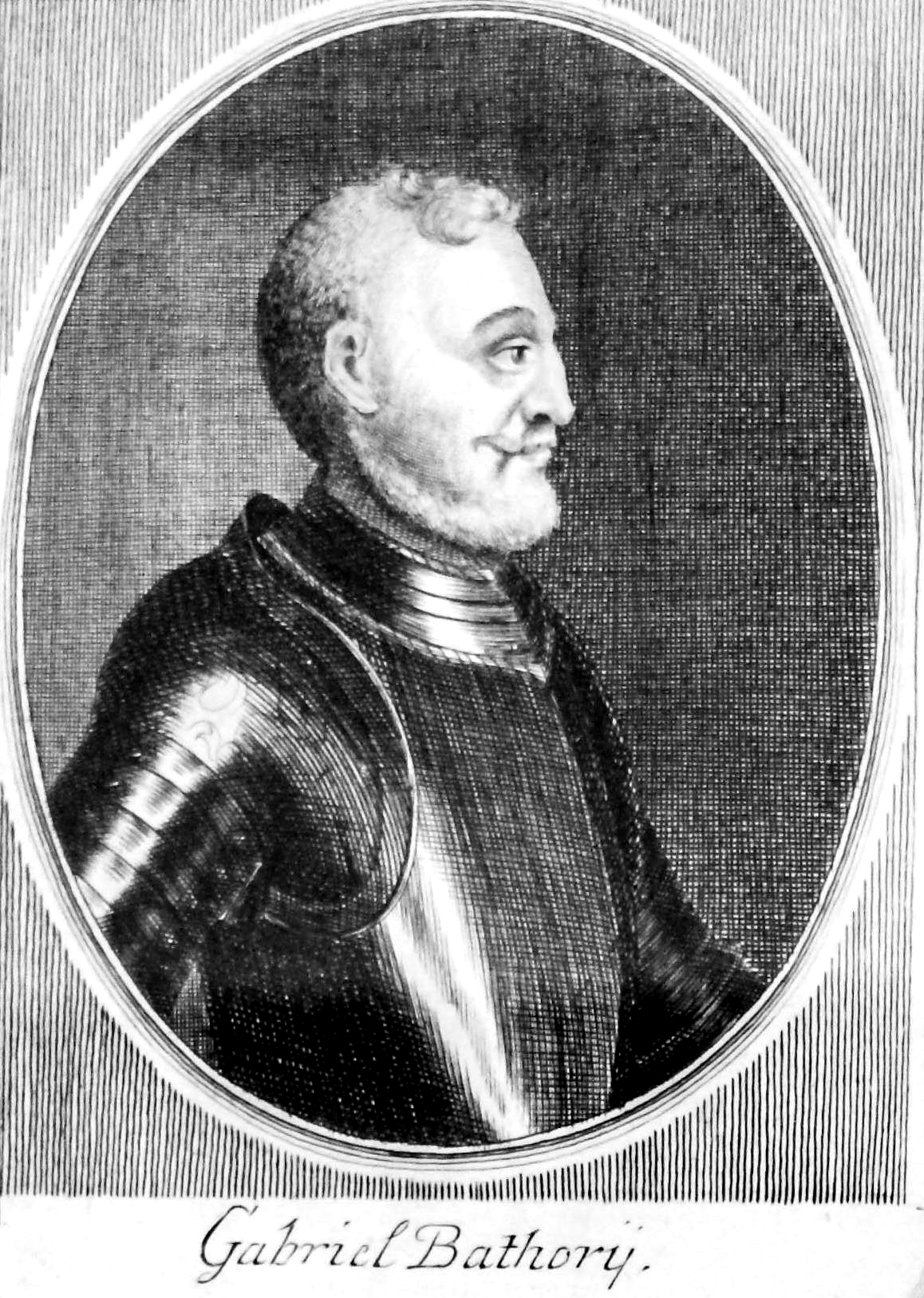
Gabriel Báthory

=== January–June ===
- January 8 – Ivan Gundulić, Croatian poet (d. 1638)
- January 11 – William Strode, English politician (d. 1666)
- January 28 – Francisco Ximénez de Urrea, Spanish historian (d. 1647)
- February 5
  - Honorat de Bueil, seigneur de Racan (d. 1670)
  - Esteban Manuel de Villegas, Spanish poet (d. 1669)
- February 7 – Jacob de Witt, Mayor of Dordrecht (d. 1674)
- February 8 – Peter Melander Graf von Holzappel, Protestant military leader in the Thirty Years' War (d. 1648)
- February 18
  - Henry Vane the Elder, English politician (d. 1655)
  - Maarten Gerritsz Vries, Dutch explorer (d. 1646)
- March 1 – Thomas Middleton, English politician (d. 1662)
- March 3 – Gisbertus Voetius, Dutch theologian (d. 1676)
- March 18 – Richard Sackville, 3rd Earl of Dorset, English noble (d. 1624)
- April 16 – Nicolaes le Febure, Dutch Golden Age member of the Haarlem schutterij (d. 1641)
- April 17 – Martin Zeiler, German author (d. 1661)
- April 18 – John, Duke of Östergötland, Swedish prince (d. 1618)
- April 20 – John Casimir, Count Palatine of Kleeburg, son of John I (d. 1652)
- April 28 – Margaret of Savoy, Vicereine of Portugal (d. 1655)
- May 12 – François L’Anglois, French artist (d. 1647)
- May 28 – Robert Arnauld d'Andilly, French writer (d. 1674)
- June 9 – John of St. Thomas, Portuguese philosopher (d. 1644)
- June 16 – Albrycht Władysław Radziwiłł, Polish prince (d. 1636)
- June 20 – Giambattista Altieri, Italian Catholic cardinal (d. 1654)

=== July–December ===
- July 2 – Richard Pepys, English politician (d. 1659)
- July 3 – Johann Georg Wirsung, German anatomist (d. 1643)
- July 15 – Cornelis Bol, Flemish painter and etcher (d. 1666)
- July 16 – Sinibaldo Scorza, Italian painter (d. 1631)
- August 1 – Alexandrine von Taxis, German Imperial General Post Master (d. 1666)
- August 8 – Framlingham Gawdy, English politician (d. 1654)
- August 12
  - Domenico Fiasella, Italian painter (d. 1669)
  - Ulrich, Duke of Pomerania, Bishop of Cammin (d. 1622)
- August 15 – Gabriel Báthory, Prince of Transylvania (d. 1613)
- September 1 – Giovanni Pesaro, Doge of Venice (d. 1659)
- September 7 – August of Saxony, German prince (d. 1615)
- September 17 – Agostinho Barbosa, Portuguese bishop in Italy and writer on canon law (d. 1649)
- October 7 – Maria Magdalena of Austria (d. 1631)
- October 8 – Pedro de Villagómez Vivanco, Roman Catholic prelate, Archbishop of Lima, then Bishop of Arequipa (d. 1671)
- October 24 – Giuseppe Marcinò, Italian priest, member of the Order of Friars Minor - or Capuchins (d. 1655)
- October 25 – Jan Stanisław Sapieha, Grand Hetman of Lithuania (d. 1635)
- October 31 – Muhammad Parviz, Mughal emperor (d. 1626)
- December 21 – Otto, Count of Lippe-Brake (1621–1657) (d. 1657)

=== Date unknown ===
- Tsar Feodor II of Russia (d. 1605)
- Yönten Gyatso, 4th Dalai Lama
- John Bankes, Attorney General and Chief Justice to King Charles I of England (d. 1644)
- Jusepa Vaca, Spanish stage actress (d. 1653)

== Deaths ==
Philothei

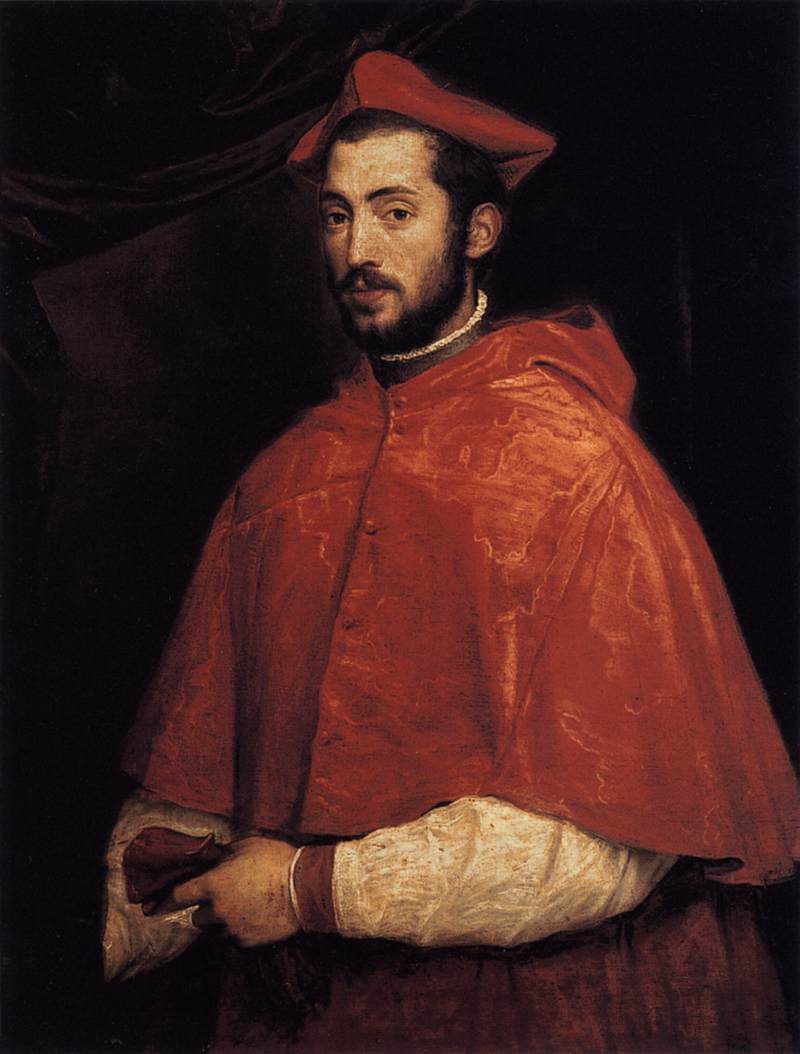
Alessandro Farnese

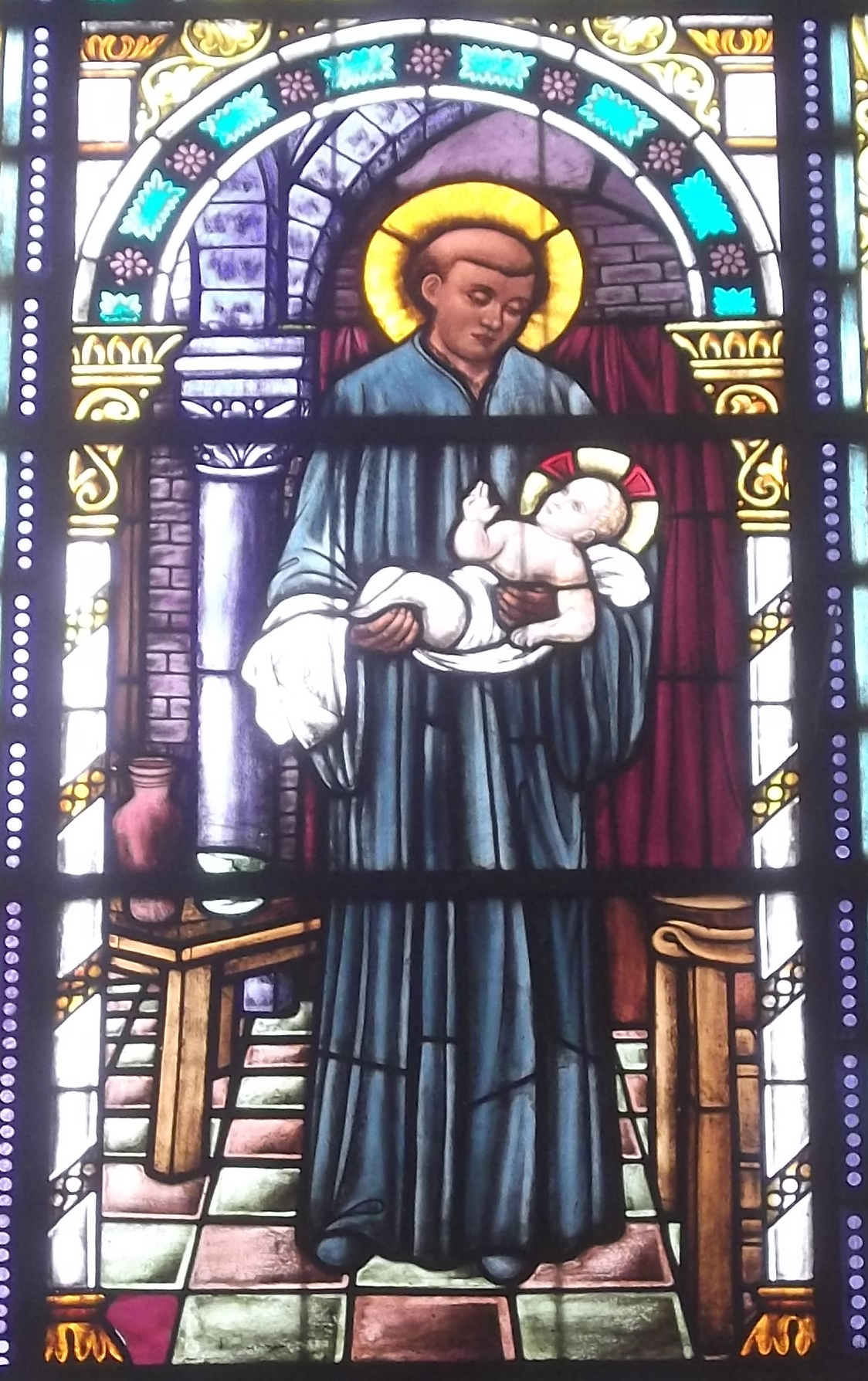
Saint Benedict the Moor

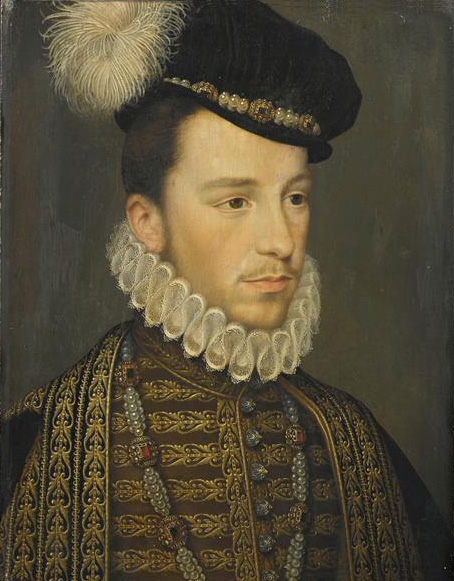
Henry III of France

- January 5 – Catherine de' Medici, queen of Henry II of France (b. 1519)
- January 18 – Magnus Heinason, Faroese naval hero (b. 1545)
- February 19 – Philothei, Greek Orthodox religious sister, martyr and saint (b. 1522)
- March 2 – Alessandro Farnese, Italian cardinal (b. 1530)
- March 3 – Johannes Sturm, German educator (b. 1507)
- March 19 – Heo Nanseolheon, Korean poet (b. 1563)
- March 22 – Lodovico Guicciardini, Italian historian (b. 1521)
- March 23 – Marcin Kromer, Prince-Bishop of Warmia (b. 1512)
- April 26
  - Benedict the Moor, Italian Franciscan friar and saint (b. 1526)
  - Tansen, Indian musician (b. c.1493/1500)
- May 3 – Julius, Duke of Brunswick-Lüneburg (b. 1528)
- May 17 – Charles II, Lord of Monaco (b. 1555)
- May 20 – Anna Maria of Brandenburg-Ansbach, German princess (b. 1526)
- July 1 – Lady Saigō, Japanese concubine (b. 1552)
- July 16 – Petrus Peckius the Elder, Dutch jurist, writer on international maritime law (b. 1529)
- July 29 – Maria of the Palatinate-Simmern, Duchess consort of Södermanland (1579–1589) (b. 1561)
- August 1 – Jacques Clément, French assassin of Henry III of France (b. 1567)
- August 2 – King Henry III of France (b. 1551)
- September 16 – Michael Baius, Flemish theologian (b. 1513)
- September 19 – Jean-Antoine de Baïf, French poet (b. 1532)
- October 1 – William Darrell of Littlecote, English politician (b. 1539)
- October 15 – Jacopo Zabarella, Italian philosopher (b. 1532)
- October 31 – Peter Stumpp, German alleged serial killer "the Werewolf of Bedburg" (b. 1535)
- November 15 – Philipp Apian, German mathematician and medic (b. 1531)
- December 10 – Henry Compton, 1st Baron Compton, English politician (b. 1544)
- December 12 – Francisco Balbi di Correggio, Italian soldier in the service of Spain during the Siege of Malta (b. 1505)

=== Date unknown ===
- Pietro de' Mariscalchi, Italian painter (b. 1520)
- Charles Dançay, French diplomat (b. 1510)
- (after September 25) – John Stubbs, English seditious pamphleteer, in France (b. 1543)
