= Urrea (surname) =

Urrea is a Hispanic surname that may refer to

- Albert Urrea (born 1987), Spanish football midfielder
- Francisco Ximénez de Urrea (1589–1647), Spanish historian and writer
- John Urrea (born 1955), American baseball player of Mexican descent
- José de Urrea (1797–1849), Mexican general
- Lourdes Urrea (born 1954), Mexican author, artist and speaker
- Luis Alberto Urrea (born 1955), Mexican-American poet, novelist, and essayist
- Misael Torres Urrea (born 1991/92), Mexican drug lord
- Noah Urrea (born 2001), American actor, singer and model
- Pedro Manuel Jiménez de Urrea (1486–1535), Spanish Renaissance poet and playwright
- Teresa Urrea (1873–1906), Mexican folk healer
