= Urrea =

Urrea may refer to

- Urrea de Gaén, a municipality in Teruel, Aragon, Spain
- Urrea de Jalón, a municipality in Zaragoza, Aragon, Spain
- Urrea (surname)
