= Boy with a pipe =

Boy with a Pipe may refer to the following paintings:

- Garçon à la pipe by Picasso (tobacco pipe)
- Shepherd with a Flute by Titian or Giorgione, Royal Collection (musical pipe)
