= Johann Albrecht Bengel =

German theologian (1687–1752)

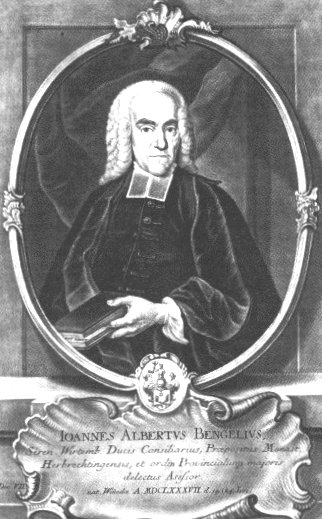
- Born: 24 June 1687; Winnenden, Duchy of Württemberg
- Died: 2 November 1752 (aged 65); Stuttgart, Duchy of Württemberg

Academic background
- Education: Tübinger Stift
- Academic advisor: Johann Wolfgang Jäger

Academic work
- Institutions: Tübinger Stift
- Notable students: Jeremias Friedrich Reuß

Johann Albrecht Bengel (24 June 1687 – 2 November 1752), also known as Bengelius, was a Lutheran pietist clergyman and Greek-language scholar known for his edition of the Greek New Testament and his commentaries on it.

== Life and career ==
Bengel was born at Winnenden in Württemberg. Due to the death of his father in 1693, he was educated by a family friend, David Wendel Spindler, who became a master in the gymnasium at Stuttgart. In 1703 Bengel left Stuttgart and entered the Tübinger Stift, where, in his spare time, he devoted himself especially to the works of Aristotle and Spinoza, and, in theology, to those of Philipp Spener, Johann Arndt and August Francke. His knowledge of the metaphysics of Spinoza was such that he was selected by one of the professors to prepare materials for a treatise, De Spinosismo, which was afterwards published.

After acquiring his degree, Bengel devoted himself to theology. Even at this time he had religious doubts; it is interesting in view of his later work that one cause of his perplexities was the difficulty of ascertaining the true reading of certain passages in the Greek New Testament. Bengel entered the ministry in 1707 and was appointed to the parochial charge of Metzingen-unter-Urach. In the following year he was recalled to Tübingen to undertake the office of Repetent (theological tutor).

He remained at Tübingen until 1713, when he was appointed head of a seminary recently established at Denkendorf as a preparatory school of theology. Before entering into his new duties he travelled through the greater part of Germany, studying the systems of education which were in use, and visiting the seminaries of the Jesuits as well as those of the Lutheran and Reformed churches. Among other places he went to Heidelberg and Halle, and had his attention directed at Heidelberg to the canons of scripture criticism published by Gerhard von Maastricht, and at Halle to Campeius Vitringa's Anacrisis ad Apocalypsin. The influence exerted by these upon his theological studies is manifest in some of his works.

For 28 years, from 1713 to 1741, he was master (German: Klosterpraeceptor) of the Klosterschule at Denkendorf, a seminary for candidates for the ministry established in a former monastery of the Canons of the Holy Sepulchre. To these years, the period of his greatest intellectual activity, belong many of his chief works. His first published work was the M. Tullii Ciceronis Epistolae ad diversos in 1719.

In 1741 he was appointed prelate (i.e. general superintendent) at Herbrechtingen, where he remained until 1749, when he was raised to the dignity of consistorial counsellor and prelate of Alpirsbach, with a residence in Stuttgart. He devoted himself to the discharge of his duties as a member of the consistory. A question of considerable difficulty was at that time occupying the attention of the church courts: the manner in which those who separated themselves from the church were to be dealt with, and the amount of toleration which should be accorded to meetings held in private houses for the purpose of religious edification. The civil power (the Duke of Württemberg was a Roman Catholic) was disposed to have recourse to measures of repression, while the members of the consistory, recognizing the good effects of such meetings, were inclined to concede considerable liberty. Bengel exerted himself on the side of the members of the consistory.

In 1749 he was appointed as councillor and prelate of Alpirsbach in Stuttgart.

In 1751 the University of Tübingen conferred upon him the degree of Doctor of Divinity.

He died in Stuttgart, aged 65.

== Beliefs and reputation ==
Bengel carried on an 18-year-long controversy with Nicolaus Ludwig, Count von Zinzendorf, leader of the Moravian Brethren from Herrnhut in Saxony. This led to a break between the Moravian Brethren and the dour Pietism typical of Württemberg, represented by Bengel. With his determined certainty giving him systematic insight into the divine Plan of Salvation, Bengel dogmatically opposed the dynamic, ecumenical, missionary efforts of Zinzendorf, who was indifferent to all dogmatism and intolerance. As Bengel did not hesitate to manipulate historical calendars in his chiliastic attempts to predict the end of the world, Zinzendorf rejected this as superstitious "interpretation of signs."

His reputation as a Biblical scholar and critic rests chiefly on his edition of the Greek New Testament (1734) and his exegetical annotations on the same, which have passed through many editions in Latin, German, and English and are still highly valued by expositors of the New Testament.

== Greek New Testament ==
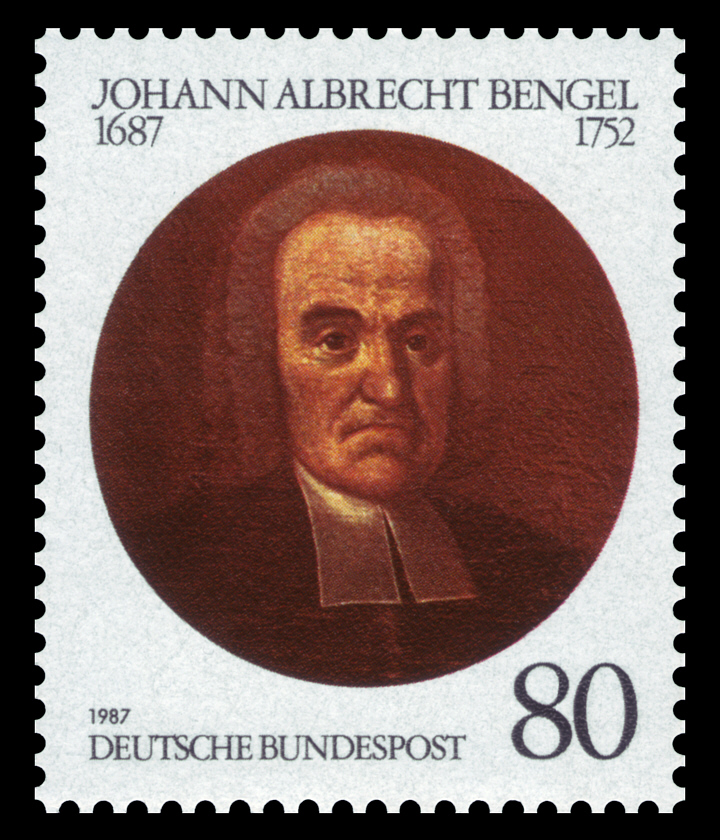
Stamp issued by the Deutsche Bundespost to commemorate the 300th anniversary of Bengel's birth

Bengel's edition of the Greek New Testament was published at Tübingen in 1734, and at Stuttgart in the same year, but without the critical apparatus. As early as 1725, in an addition to his edition of Chrysostoms De Sacerdotio, he had given an account in his Prodromus Novi Testamenti Graeci recte cauteque adornandi of the principles on which his intended edition was to be based. In preparation for his work, Bengel was able to avail himself of the collations of upwards of twenty manuscripts, none of them, however, of great importance, twelve of which had been collated by himself. In constituting the text, he imposed upon himself the singular restriction of not inserting any variant reading which had not already been printed in some preceding edition of the Greek text. From this rule, however, he deviated in the case of the Apocalypse, where, owing to the corrupt state of the text, he felt himself at liberty to introduce certain readings on manuscript authority. In the lower margin of the page he inserted a selection of various readings, the relative importance of which he denoted by the first five letters of the Greek alphabet in the following manner: α was employed to denote the reading which in his judgment was the true one, although he did not venture to place it in the text; β, a reading better than that in the text; γ, one equal to the textual reading; and δ, readings inferior to those in the text. Robert Estienne's division into verses was retained in the inner margin, but the text was divided into paragraphs.

The text was followed by a critical apparatus, the first part of which consisted of an introduction to the criticism of the New Testament, in the thirty-fourth section of which he laid down and explained his celebrated canon, Proclivi scriptioni praestat ardua (The difficult reading is to be preferred to that which is easy), the soundness of which, as a general principle, has been recognized by succeeding critics. The second part of the critical apparatus was devoted to a consideration of the various readings, and here Bengel adopted the plan of stating the evidence both against and in favor of a particular reading, thus placing before the reader the materials for forming a judgment. Bengel was the first definitely to propound the theory of families or recensions of manuscripts.

His investigations had led him to see that a certain affinity or resemblance existed amongst many of the authorities for the Greek text manuscripts, versions, and ecclesiastical writers: for example, if a peculiar reading was found in one of these, it was generally also found in the other members of the same class; and this general relationship seemed to point ultimately to a common origin for all the authorities which presented such peculiarities. Although disposed at first to divide the various documents into three classes, he finally adopted a classification into two: the African or older family of documents, and the Asiatic, or more recent class, to which he attached only a subordinate value. The theory was afterwards adopted by J.S. Semler and J.J. Griesbach, and worked up into an elaborate system by the latter critic.

Bengel's labors on the text of the Greek Testament were received with great disfavour in many quarters. Like Brian Walton and John Mill before him, he had to encounter the opposition of those who believed that the certainty of the word of God was endangered by the importance attached to the various readings. JJ Wetstein, on the other hand, accused him of excessive caution in not making freer use of his critical materials. In answer to these strictures, Bengel published a Defence of the Greek Text of His New Testament, which he prefixed to his Harmony of the Four Gospels, published in 1736, and which contained an answer to the complaints, especially of Wetstein, which had been made against him.

The text of Bengel long enjoyed a high reputation among scholars, and was frequently reprinted. An enlarged edition of the critical apparatus was published by Philip David Burk in 1763.

== Gnomon Novi Testamenti ==
The other great work of Bengel, and that on which his reputation as an exegete is mainly based, is his Gnomon Novi Testamenti, or Exegetical Annotations on the New Testament, published in 1742. It was the fruit of twenty years labor, and exhibits with a brevity of expression, which, it has been said, condenses more matter into a line than can be extracted from pages of other writers, the results of his study. He modestly entitled his work a Gnomon or index, his object being rather to guide the reader to ascertain the meaning for himself, than to save him from the trouble of personal investigation. The principles of interpretation on which he proceeded were, to import nothing into Scripture, but to draw out of it everything that it really contained, in conformity with grammatico-historical rules not to be hampered by dogmatical considerations; and not to be influenced by the symbolical books. Bengel's hope that the Gnomon would help to rekindle a fresh interest in the study of the New Testament was fully realized. It has passed through many editions, has been translated into German and into English (by Charlton T. Lewis and Marvin Vincent in 1860), and is still valued by expositors of the New Testament. Methodist founder John Wesley made great use of it in compiling his Explanatory Notes upon the New Testament (1755). This was despite an initial inclination towards "consulting none but the inspired writers".

Besides the two works already described, Bengel was the editor or author of many others, classical, patristic, ecclesiastical and expository. The more important are: Ordo Temporum, a treatise on the chronology of Scripture, in which he enters upon speculations regarding the end of the world, and an Exposition of the Apocalypse which enjoyed for a time great popularity in Germany, and was translated into several languages. His fame was such that almost 200 years later, Hermann Hesse has the hero of The Glass Bead Game discuss Bengel's writings.

== Chiliastic views ==
Bengel’s meticulous study of the Bible led him to believe that dates and time periods were related, all the way through from Genesis to Revelation, bringing him to the conclusion that June 18, 1836 would witness the start of the Millennium, to include the fall of the Antichrist, which he believed to be the Roman Catholic Church, the conversion of the Jews, the reign of Christ for 1000 years as promised in Revelation 20, and the final judgement.

Bengel’s calculations regarding a date for the return of Christ and the end-times influenced not only his contemporary, John Wesley, but also Johann Heinrich Jung-Stilling, whose inclusion of Bengel’s date into his famous novel, Das Heimweh (Homesickness or Nostalgia) inspired many German Pietists at the time to emigrate towards the east, where they sought safety until Christ’s return. The great German theologian, inventor and astronomer, Philipp Matthäus Hahn (1739 - 1790), constructed an astronomical clock inspired by Bengel’s eschatological calculations, and his granddaughter, Pauline Beate, was to marry Christoph Hoffmann, the founder of the Adventist group, the German Templers.

Bengel’s date for the Second Coming and the final judgement were largely unknown by the English speaking Adventists during the early 19th century, partly due to the fact that he wrote in Latin, which was translated into German, and partly overshadowed by the popular writings of William Miller and his projected date of 1844.
