= Feltre =

- Comune
- Comune di Feltre
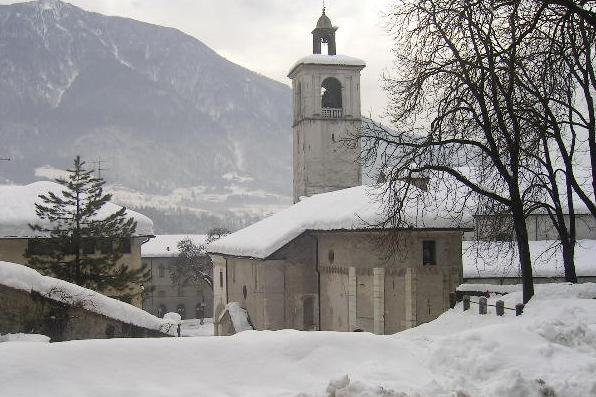
- The Cathedral of Feltre

- Coat of arms

- Location within Italy Location within Veneto
- Coordinates: 46°01′07″N 11°54′36″E
- Country: Italy
- Region: Veneto
- Province: Belluno (BL)
- Frazioni: see list

Government
  - Mayor: Viviana Fusaro

Area
  - Total: 100 km^{2} (39 sq mi)
- Elevation: 325 m (1,066 ft)

Population (December 31, 2025)
  - Total: 20,600
  - Density: 210/km^{2} (530/sq mi)
- Demonym: Feltrini
- Time zone: UTC+1 (CET)
  - Summer (DST): UTC+2 (CEST)
- Postal code: 32032
- Dialing code: 0439
- Patron saint: Saints Victor and Corona
- Saint day: May 14
- Website: Official website

Feltre (Italian pronunciation: [ˈfeltre]; Venetian: Fèltre) is a town and comune of the province of Belluno in Veneto, northern Italy. A hill town in the southern reaches of the province, it is located on the Stizzon River, about 4 kilometres (2 miles) from its junction with the Piave, and 20 km (12 mi) southwest from Belluno. The Dolomites loom to the north of the town.

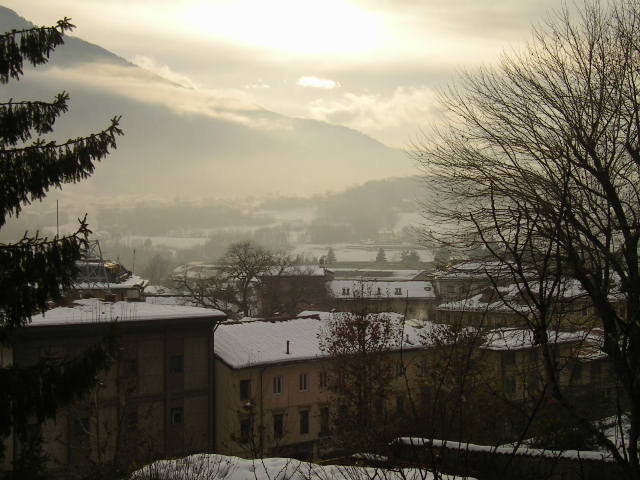
Panorama of Feltre in winter

An area incorporating Feltre and 12 contiguous municipalities is known as Feltrino. In 2014, the Feltrino area was formalised in the Unione Montana Feltrina (Feltrino Mountain Community).

== History ==
It was known in Roman times as Feltria and described as an oppidum by Pliny, who assigned its foundation to the Alpine tribe of the Rhaetians. The city obtained the status of municipium in 49 BC with its citizens inscribed into the Roman tribe of Menenia. In spite of its rigorous climate, which led a Roman author, perhaps Caesar, to write:

Feltria perpetuo niveum damnata rigore
Atque mihi posthac haud adeunda, vale

Feltria lay on a Roman road mentioned in the Antonine Itinerary as passing from Opitergium (Oderzo) through Feltria to Tridentum (Trento).

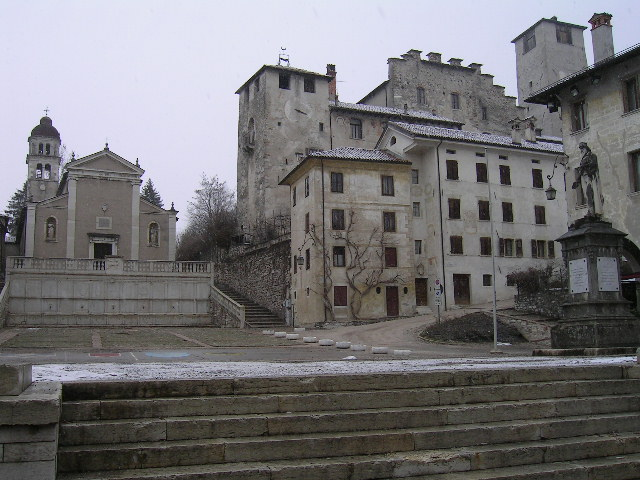
The Church of St. Roch and the Castle of Alboin

After the fall of the Western Empire, under which it had developed into a flourishing city, it became an Ostrogoth and later Lombard dominion. During the reign of Theodoric the Great, the wealthy class of Feltre was ordered to contribute to the construction of a new city near Trento, the location of which is lost. It is notable that the order was given to the citizens, and not the city council of Feltre. Later in the Middle Ages, it was ruled by Ezzelino III da Romano, by the Da Camino family, and then by the Scaligers of Verona, from 1315 to 1337. Feltre was subsequently under Charles IV, Holy Roman Emperor, the da Carrara and the Visconti until 1404, when, together with Belluno, it was conquered by the Republic of Venice. In 1499 it received a new line of walls.

In 1509 the center of the town was mostly destroyed during battles between the Venetians and the League of Cambrai, and later rebuilt with a characteristic 16th-century style. In 1797, after the capitulation of Venice to Napoleon, it was ruled for some time by the French. Napoleon made his minister of war, Henri Jacques Guillaume Clarke, Duke of Feltre in 1807. After the Congress of Vienna (1814), Feltre was assigned to the Austrian Empire, to which it remained until it was joined to the Kingdom of Italy in 1866.

It was besieged by Austria during World War I.

During World War II, Adolf Hitler demanded a meeting with Benito Mussolini to discuss his strategy for defending Italy from the Allied Armies since the Axis armies had just surrendered Tunis to the British Army, giving Allied Armies total control of North Africa. This meeting took place on July 19, 1943 in Feltre, Italy.

Notable people of Feltre include Panfilo Castaldi, printer; Bernardine of Feltre, Friar Minor, missionary and founder of Monti di Pietà; Vittorino da Feltre, humanist educator; Stefano Doglioni, the bebop bass clarinetist; and Morto da Feltre, painter.

== Main sights ==
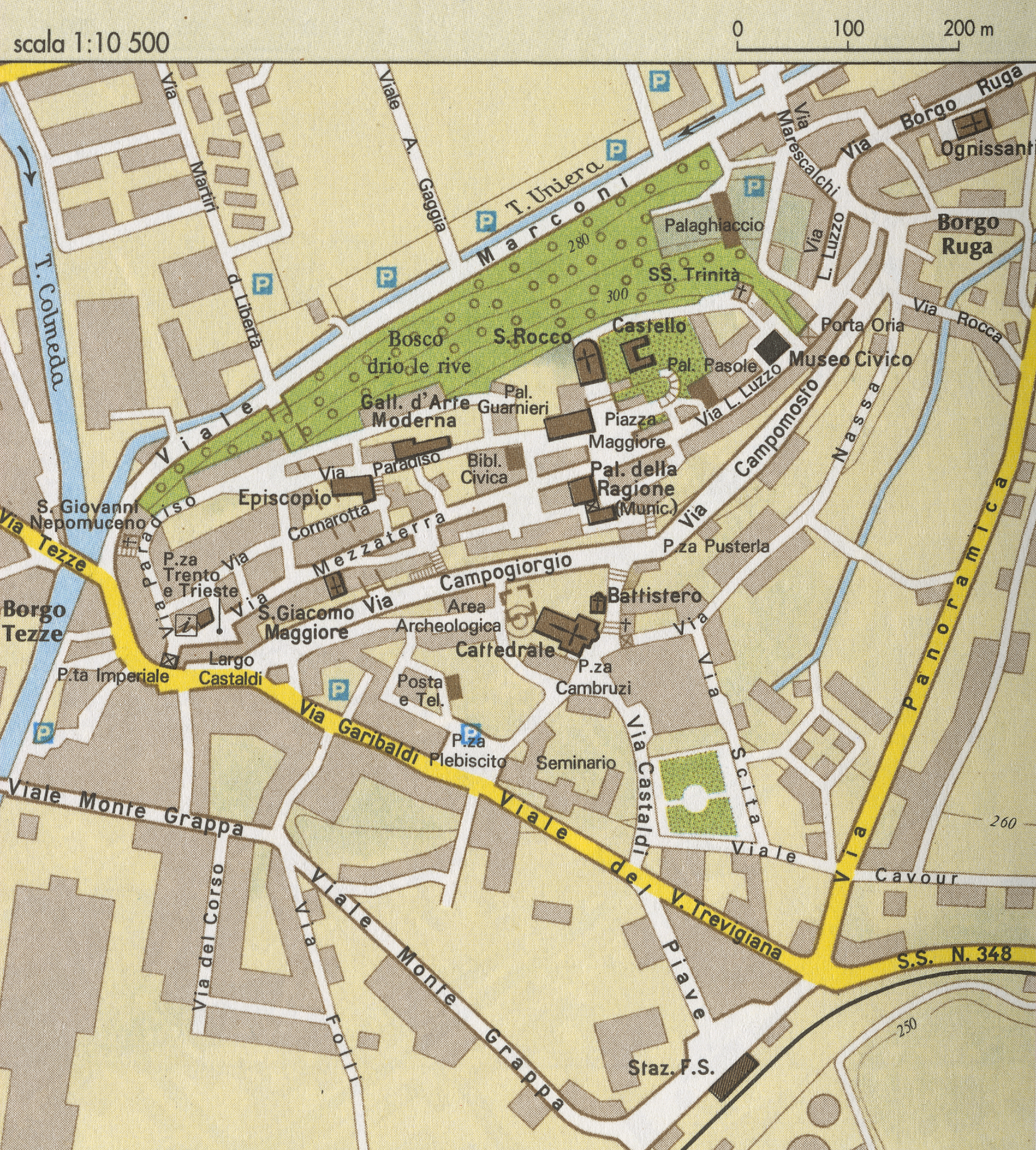
Map of the city

- The Cathedral, dedicated to St. Peter and rebuilt in Renaissance times. It has maintained from the preceding buildings the apse and the 14th-century campanile. The interior has works by Pietro Marescalchi and some 17th-century wooden statues. The church is flanked by the 15th-century baptistry, housing a precious Medieval baptismal font from 1399. Under the cathedral is an excavated archaeological area of 1,000 m^{2} (10,763.91 sq ft) belonging to the ancient Roman city.
- The Imperial Gate (1489, restored in 1545), from which the Via Mezzaterra starts. This is faced by the noteworthy Casa Crico, Casa Cantoni and Palazzo Muffoni.
- Palazzo Salce.
- The Palazzo della Ragione (16th century), the current Town Hall, with a Palladian style portico. It opens to the Piazza Maggiore with a fountain by Tullio Lombardo and a column surmounted by the Lion of St. Mark. In the same piazza are Palazzo Guarnieri and a Baroque staircase leading to the church of St. Roch (1576–1632), flanked by the so-called "Castle of Alboin" with the Torre dell'Orologio, once part of the Roman defensive apparatus. The Castle's attribution to the Lombard kingdom of Alboin has no historical evidence.
- The Pinacoteca, in Palazzo Villabruna, has works by Morto da Feltre, Cima da Conegliano, Gentile Bellini, Pietro Marescalchi and others.
- The church and the monastery of Santa Maria degli Angeli, begun in 1492, but entirely renovated in the 19th century, has maintained part of the ancient cloister. It houses a painting by Jacopo Bassano.

Outside the city are:

- The sanctuary of SS. Vittore e Corona (12th–15th century), dedicated to Saints Victor and Corona, outside the city shows a mix of Byzantine and Renaissance styles, and is home to some 14th-century Giottoesque frescoes. Sculptures include the martyrium that houses the relics of the two Eastern saints and a small statue of St. Victor.
- The late Renaissance Villa Pasole - Berton stands on the site of the Castle of Pedavena, destroyed by Emperor Charles IV in 1350.

== Frazioni ==
Anzù, Arson, Canal, Cart, Cellarda, Croci, Farra, Foen, Grum, Lamen, Lasen, Mugnai, Nemeggio, Pont, Pren, Sanzan, Tomo, Umin, Vellai, Vignui, Villabruna, Villaga, Villapaiera, Zermen.

== Infrastructure and transport ==
State roads lead from Feltre to Treviso, Belluno, Ponte nelle Alpi and Vittorio Veneto.

Feltre railway station forms part of the Calalzo–Padua railway. It is served by regional trains operated by Trenitalia as part of the service contract stipulated with the Veneto Region.

== Sport ==
=== Sporting Events ===
- On May 26, 2000, the 12th stage of the Giro d'Italia ended in Feltre with Enrico Cassani winning.
- On May 25, 2011, the 17th stage of the Giro d'Italia started in Feltre.
- The International Bocce Federation designated Italy, as Feltre, as the host of the 2011 Senior World Championships. For the occasion, 16 lanes were set up in the Ice Rink.
- On June 1, 2019, the 20th stage of the Giro d'Italia started in Feltre.
- On May 29, 2026, the 19th stage of the Giro d'Italia starts in Feltre, finishing in Alleghe (Piani di Pezzè).

== Notable people ==
- Panfilo Castaldi, printer
- Blessed Bernardine of Feltre, Friar Minor, missionary and founder of Monti di Pietà
- Vittorino da Feltre, humanist educator
- Morto da Feltre, painter

== Twin towns – sister cities ==
Feltre is twinned with:

- Bagnols-sur-Cèze, France
- Braunfels, Germany
- Carcaixent, Spain
- Dudelange, Luxembourg
- Eeklo, Belgium
- Kiskunfélegyháza, Hungary
- Newbury, England, United Kingdom

== Gallery ==
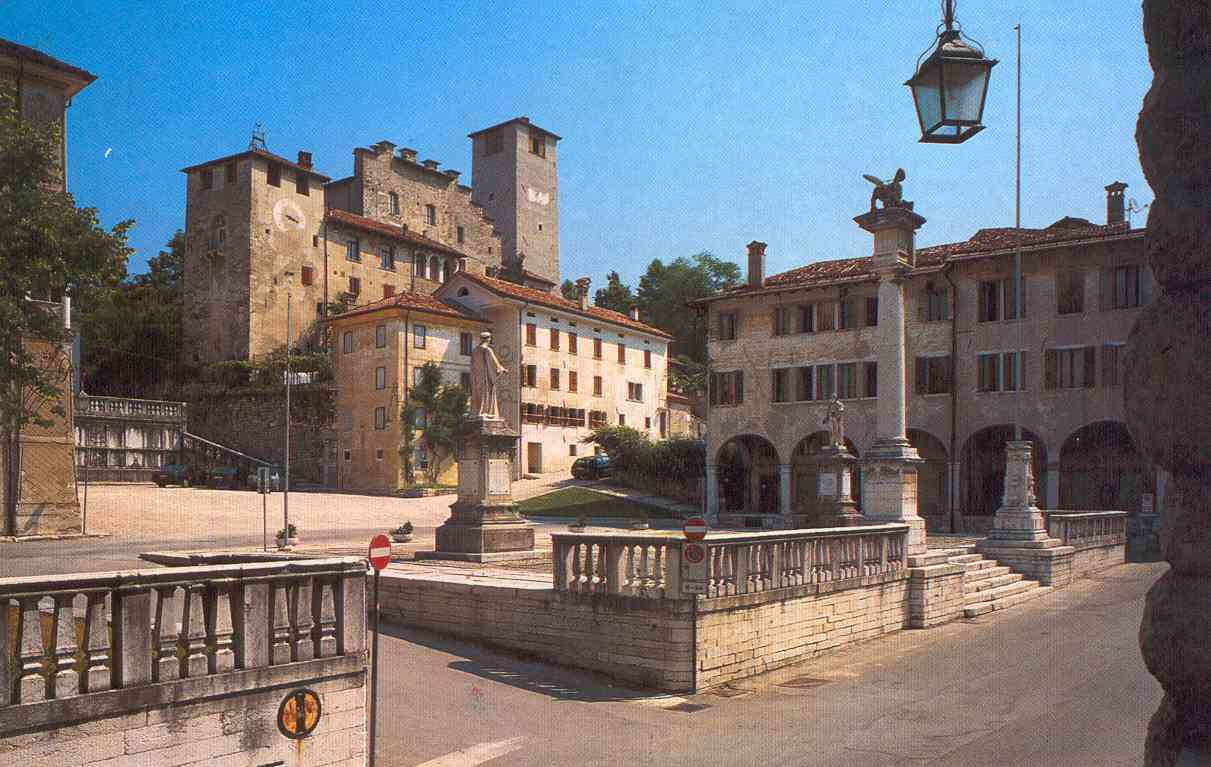
Piazza Maggiore

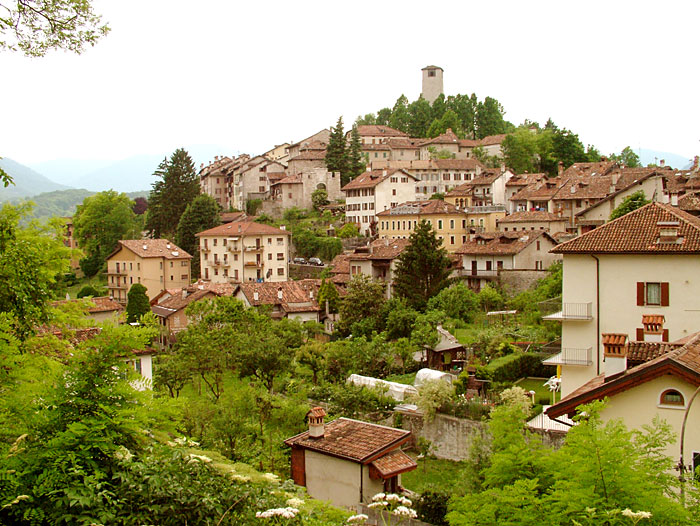
Historical Centre; view from via Panoramica

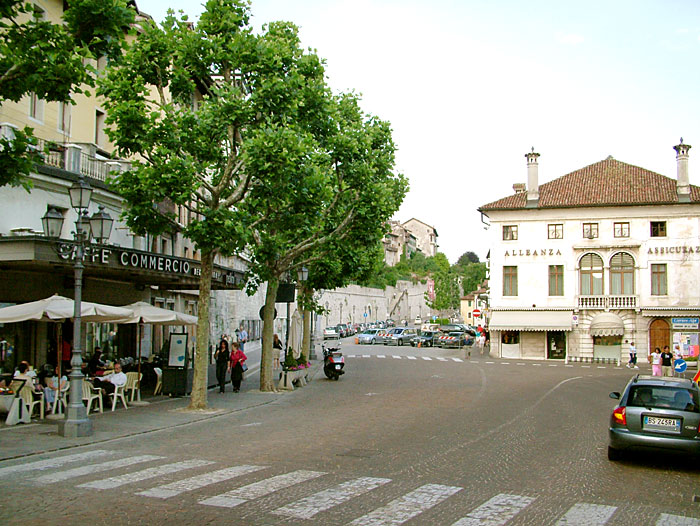
View of via Roma

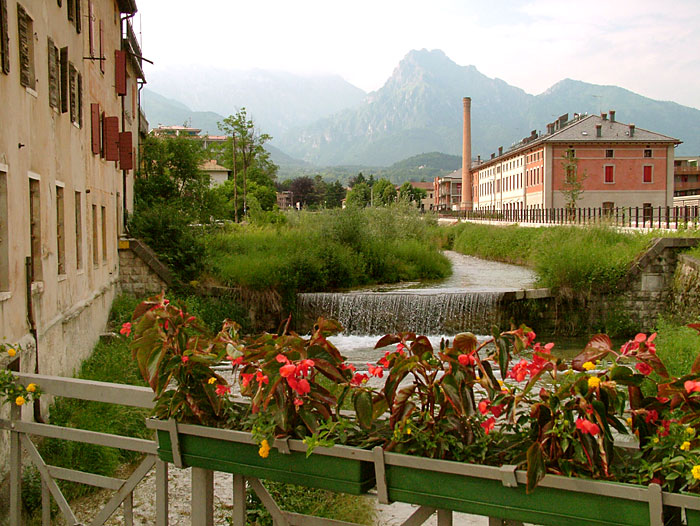
View of the Dolomites from via Tezze

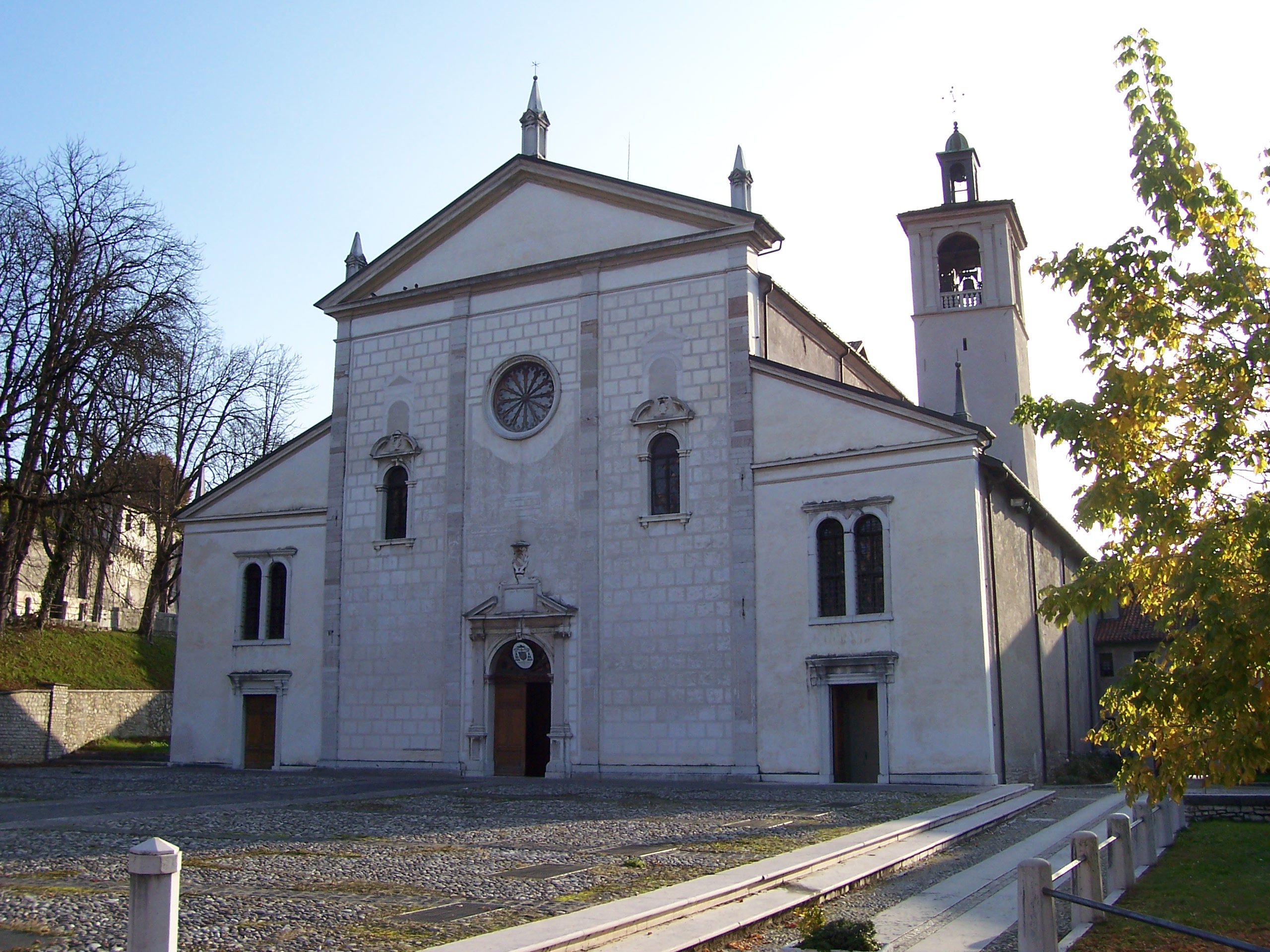
the Duomo of Feltre
