= Shepherd with a Flute =

Painting attributed to Titian

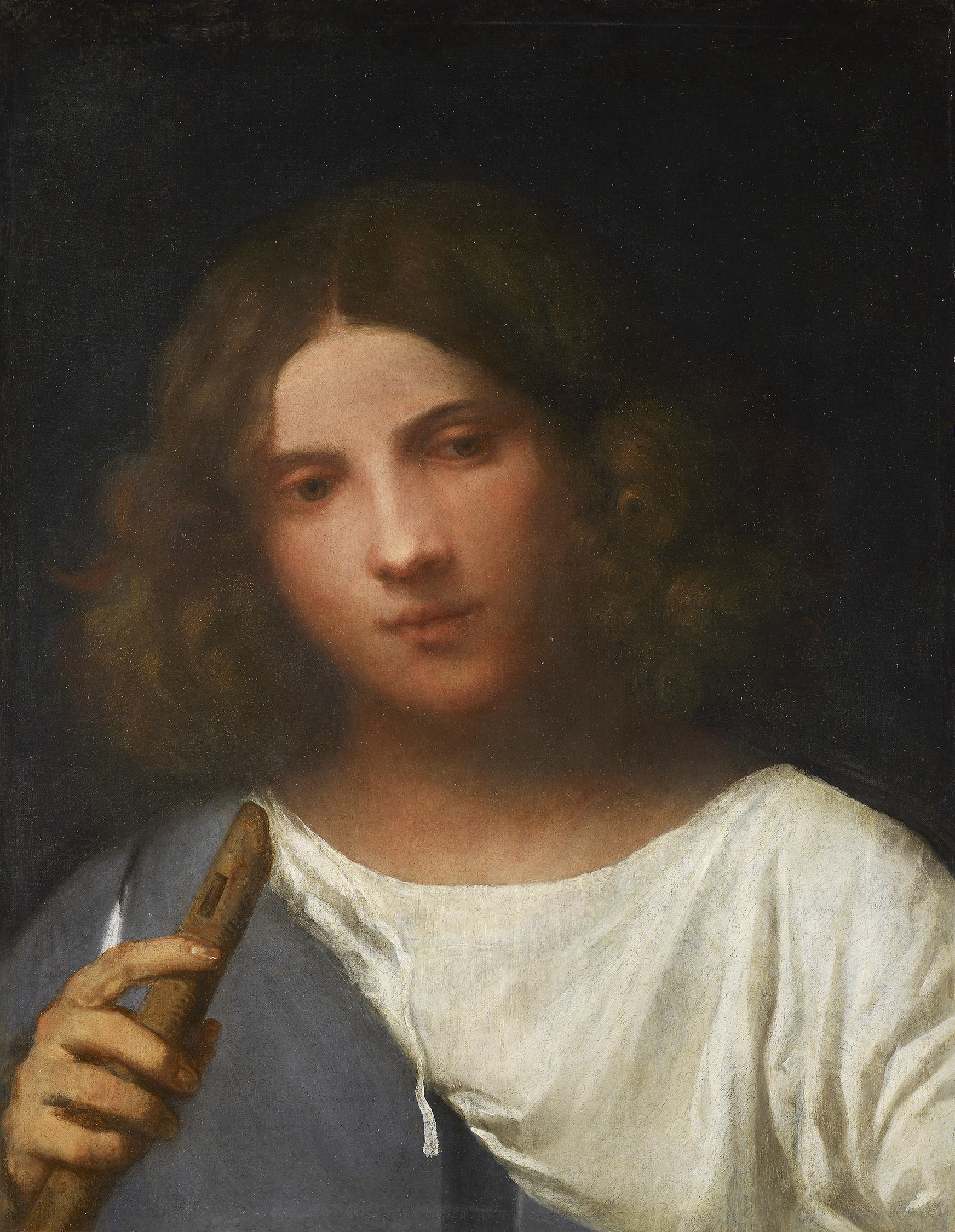
- Artist: attributed to Titian
- Year: c. 1510–15
- Medium: oil on canvas
- Dimensions: 62.5 cm × 49.1 cm (24.6 in × 19.3 in)
- Location: Royal Collection

Shepherd with a Flute, or Boy with a Pipe, is a painting in oil on canvas of perhaps 1510–1515, in recent decades usually attributed to Titian, though in the past often to Giorgione. It is now in the Royal Collection in the King's Closet at Windsor Castle. Since at least 1983 it has been called Boy with a Pipe ('The Shepherd') by the Royal Collection; previous titles the collection recognise include Shepherd with a pipe, and The Shepherd.

A boy or young man now in a loose white shirt looks away from the viewer out of the picture space, apparently "lost in thought". He holds a woodwind instrument, as though he has just been playing it. X-ray radiography reveals that the figure "originally wore a more formal style of white shirt with continuous gathers under a slate-blue doublet". This has implications for the question of whether the painting was ever intended as a portrait of an individual, or, as is generally thought more likely, is an idealized and generalized image of a type. This type of painting can be traced back to Leonardo da Vinci but was taken up by several Venetian artists in the early 16th century.

Though now not generally thought to be painted by Giorgione, the composition and subject are certainly very much in his style, and this may be a copy of a lost original by him. It is very similar in composition and mood to the Boy with an Arrow, (1506?) in the Kunsthistorisches Museum, Vienna, which is "a rare example of a painting still universally attributed to Giorgione". This is partly because it was mentioned by Marcantonio Michiel in 1531, along with a lost "shepherd who holds fruit in his hand".

== Attribution ==
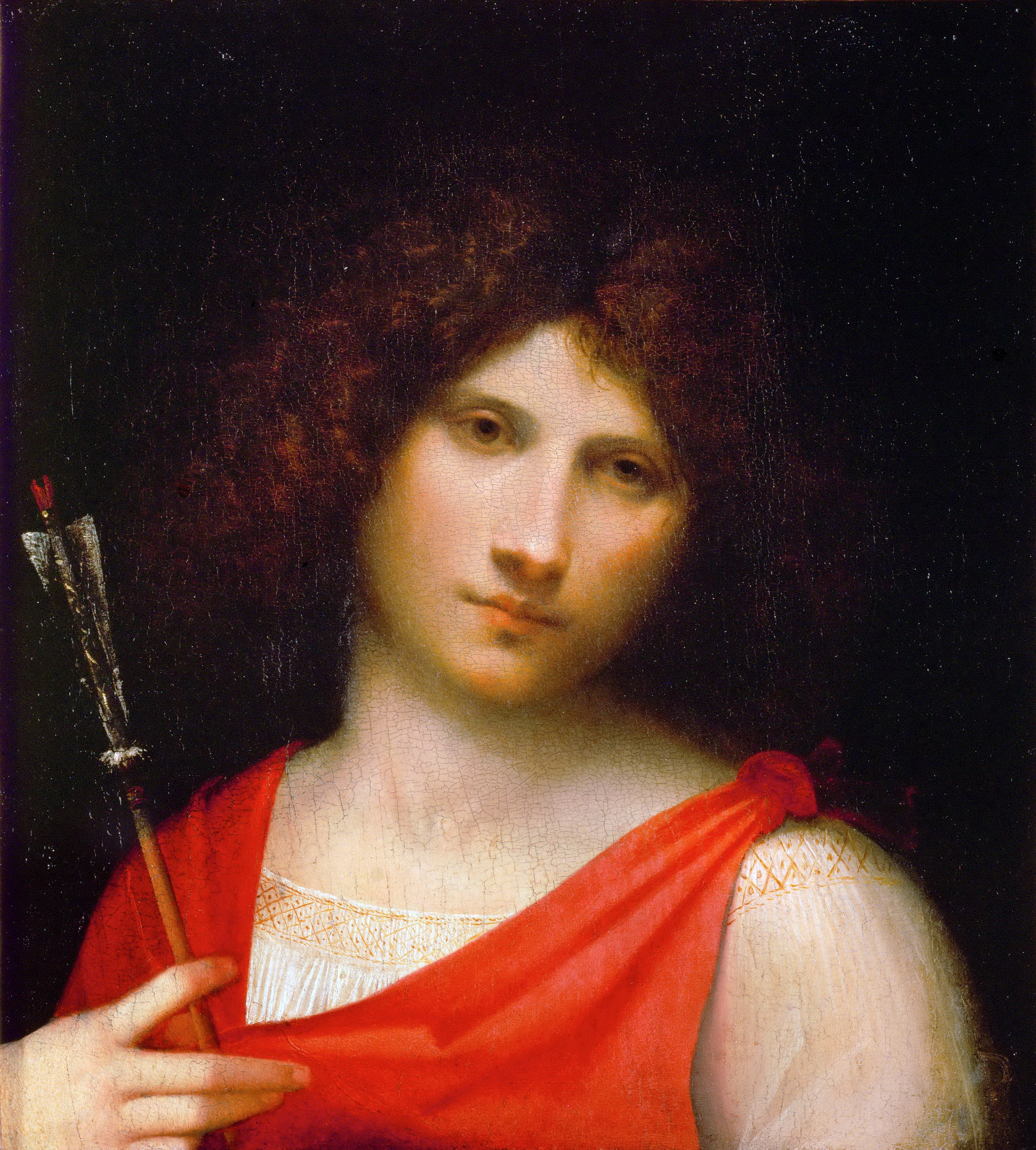
Boy with an Arrow, (1506?) Kunsthistorisches Museum, Vienna. This is agreed to be by Giorgione.

Bernard Berenson was a strong supporter of the attribution to Giorgione, which still has some support. If by Giorgione, who died in 1510, it would probably date to around 1508. Crowe and Cavalcaselle had already doubted the attribution in the later 19th century. The attribution to Titian was most fully stated by John Shearman in his catalogue of this period in the Royal Collection, and has been agreed by many, including S. J. Freedberg. Despite the similarity in the subject, the painting technique is regarded as very different from Giorgione's and close to undoubted early Titians.

Other possibilities include Francesco Torbido and Morto da Feltre, suggested by various scholars in the 20th century. The painting, in particular the composition of the head, also relates closely to another Giorgionesque bust figure in Vienna, David with the Head of Goliath; both may have a common model. X-rays reveal that the Vienna "David" originally held a lute, and the attributes of David were added later.

== Provenance ==
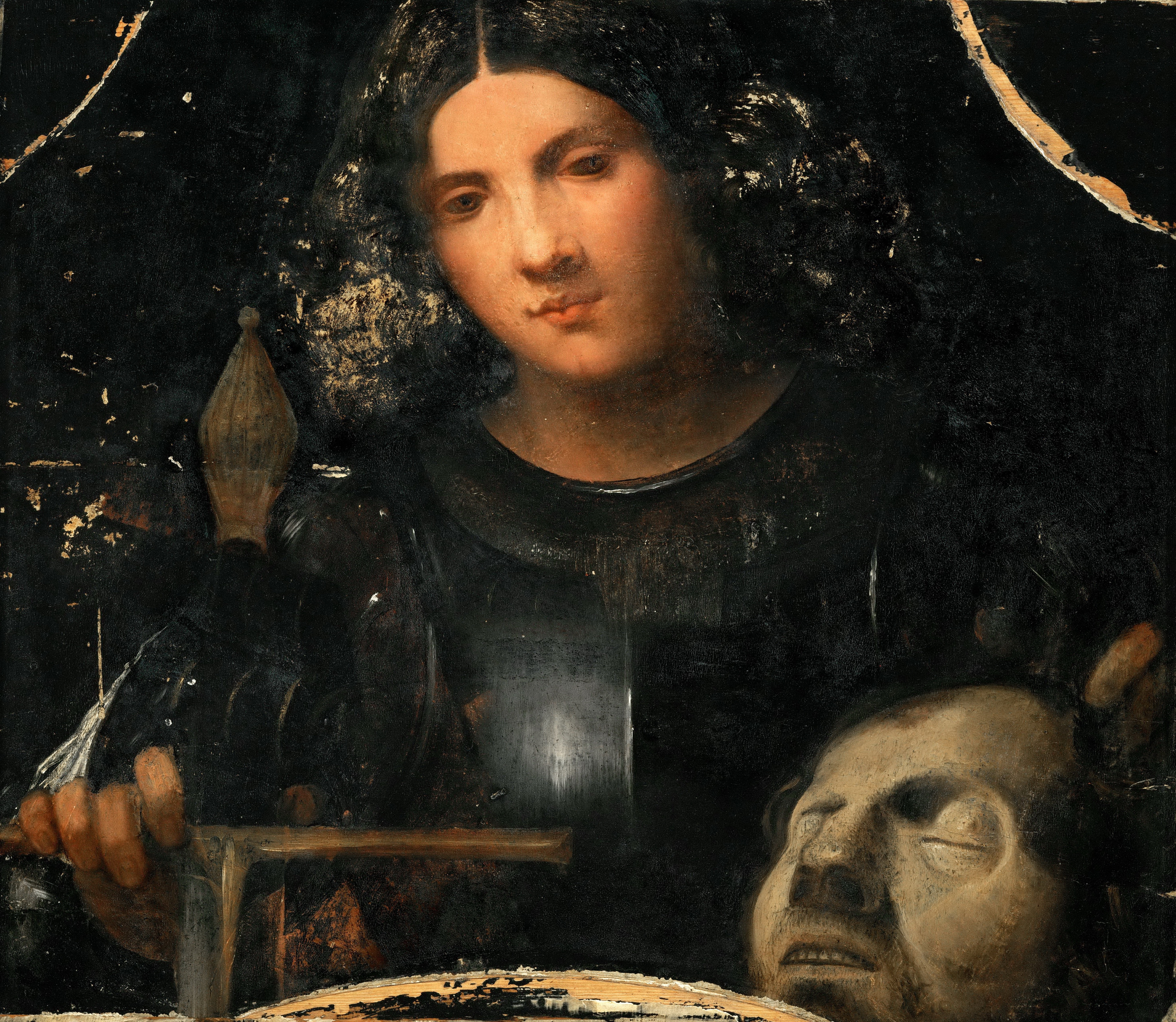
Giorgionesque David with the Head of Goliath, also Vienna

It was bought at an unknown date by Charles I of England as a work by Giorgione. Following the execution of the king, it was valued at £30 and sold in 1650 to De Critz and Co. In 1660, on the English Restoration, it was recovered by Charles II of England. It was hung at Whitehall Palace then Kensington Palace, before being moved to Hampton Court Palace in 1833, which was already open to the public, and for long displayed most of the Italian Renaissance paintings in the Royal Collection. It remained there until the Italian Renaissance paintings were moved out in recent years.

== In literature ==
The painting was the subject of a poem by "Michael Field", in fact Katharine Harris Bradley (1846–1914) and her niece, ward and lover Edith Emma Cooper (1862–1913). Their volume Sight and Song, published in 1892, was a collection of poems on individual paintings, most from the Italian Renaissance.

== See also ==
- List of works by Titian
