= Jan Hendrik Brandon =

Dutch painter

- Born: 1660; Sedan, Sedan, France
- Died: 1714 (aged 53–54); Utrecht

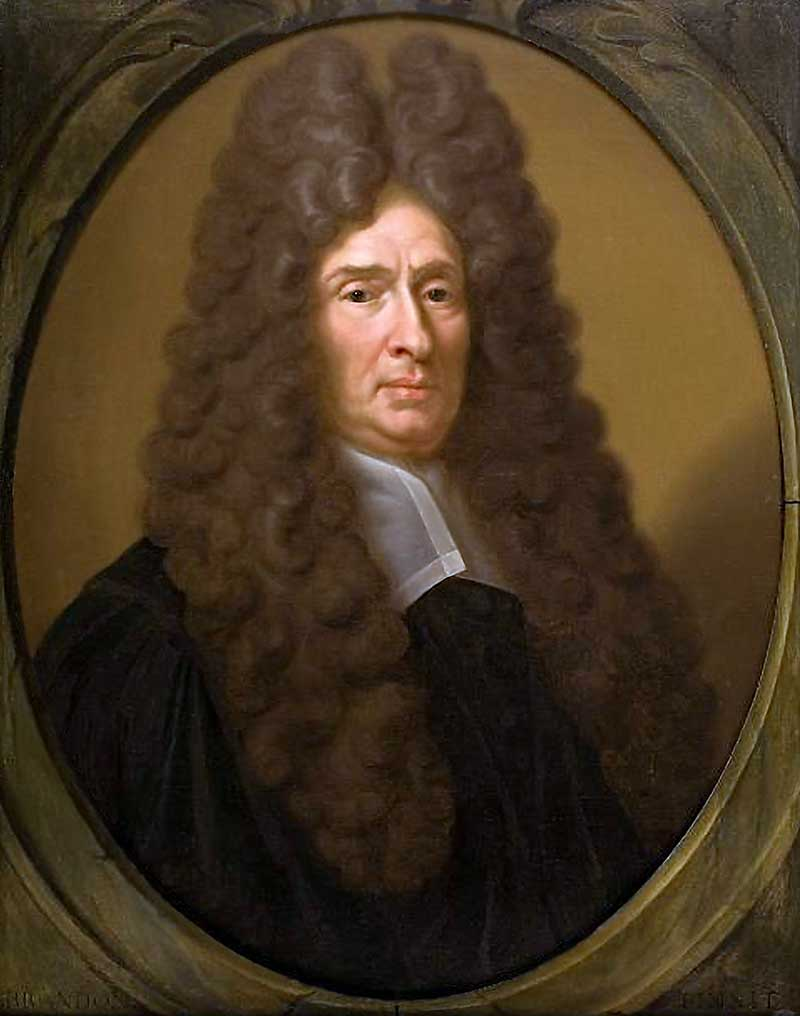
Portrait of Philipp Reinhard Vitriarius

Jan Hendrik Brandon or Jean Henri Brandon (1660–1714) was a Dutch painter from France.

Brandon joined the Confrerie Pictura in 1696 and became known for portraits. He became director of the academy in The Hague in the period that Jan van Gool attended classes there in 1703. He moved to Utrecht in 1708, where he later died.
