= Johann Jacob Vitriarius =

Dutch jurist of German descent

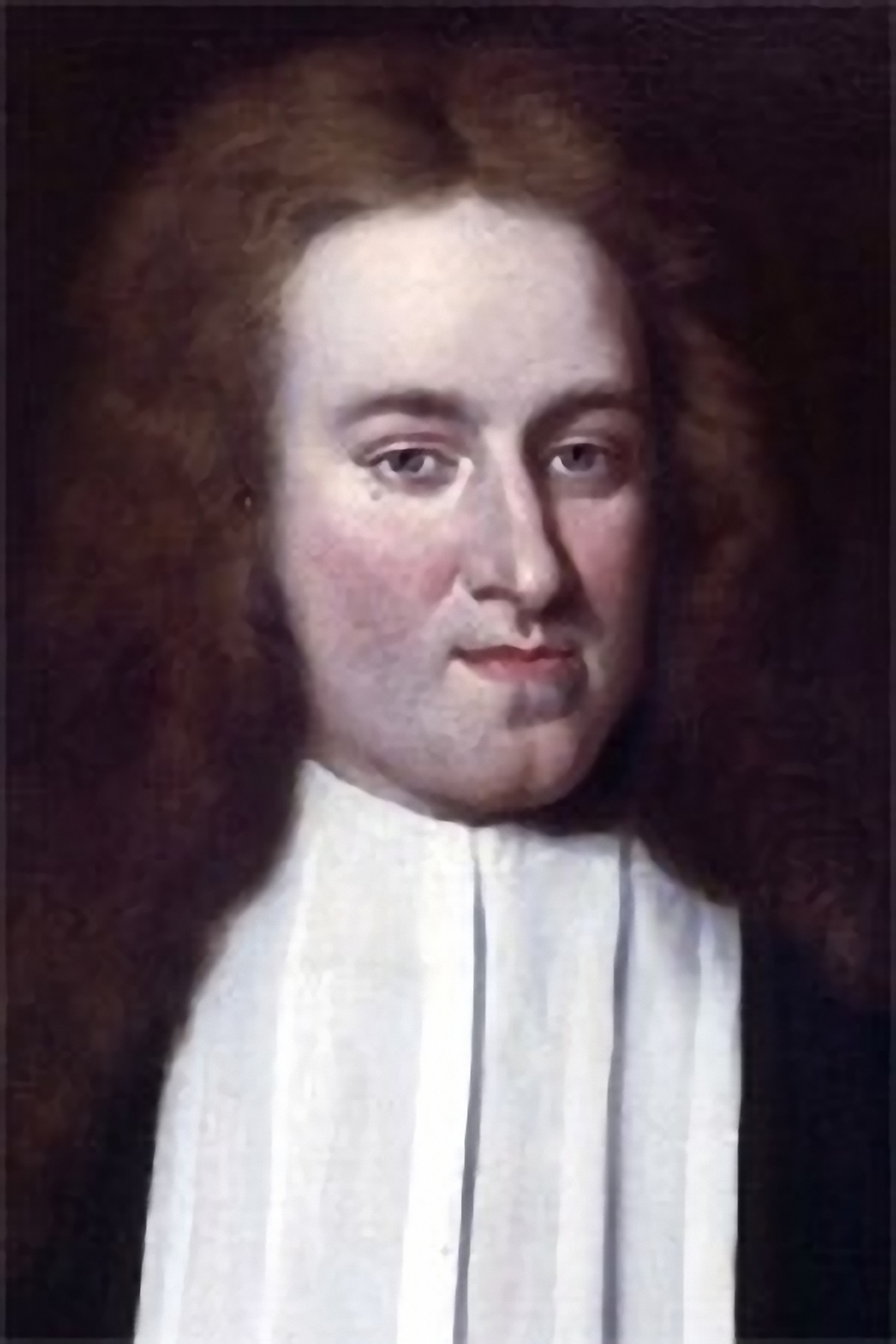
- Johannes Jacobus Vitriarius c. 1735
- Born: 8 June 1679; Geneva
- Died: 12 December 1745 (aged 66); Leiden
- Occupation: Jurist

Johann Jacob Vitriarius (8 June 1679 - 12 December 1745) was a Dutch jurist of German descent.

== Life ==
Johann Jacob Vitrarius was the son of the German jurist Philipp Reinhard Vitriarius, who between 1675 and 1682 taught law at the Geneva Academy. At the age of 2 or 3 he moved to Leiden in the Dutch Republic when his father became professor at Leiden University. Eventually, Vitriarius studied law at the same university, earning a doctorate there in 1701 with the thesis Disputio juridica inauguralis de acquisitione rerum originaria.

Vitrarius became a professor of law at Heidelberg University in 1706 and was appointed to the law faculty at Utrecht University on 4 June 1708, commencing on 17 September 1708. During 1714-15 he was Rector Magnificus at Utrecht. He left Utrecht in 1719 to take up a position at Leiden. Here he took the place of his father, and was equally widely acclaimed, particularly by the German students who at that time often studied at Dutch universities. He taught at Leiden until 15 January 1720.

Vitrarius died on 12 December 1745 in Leiden, aged 66.

== Bibliography ==
- Annotati ad Grotii de jure belli ac pacis libros tres, 1724
- Annotata ad Sam. Stryckii examen juris feudalis. XVIII century, 1724
- Notes on Roman Law, Alexander Boswell, 1724 , 1724
- Observationes in Hugonem Grotium de Jure Belli ac Pacis. 1728-29, Alexander Boswell, 1724
- Phil. Reinh. Vitriarii ... Institutiones Juris Naturae et Gentium ... ad Methodum Hugonis Grotii conscriptae, Leiden, Apud Samuelem Luchtmans, 1734; with Johann Franz Buddeus's Historia juris naturalis, Synopsis juris naturalis & gentium ..., ut & Specimen jurisprudentiae historicae.
- Oratio funebris in obitum ... Antonii Schultingii, Halae Magdeburgicae, 1734
