= Andrea di Cosimo =

Italian painter

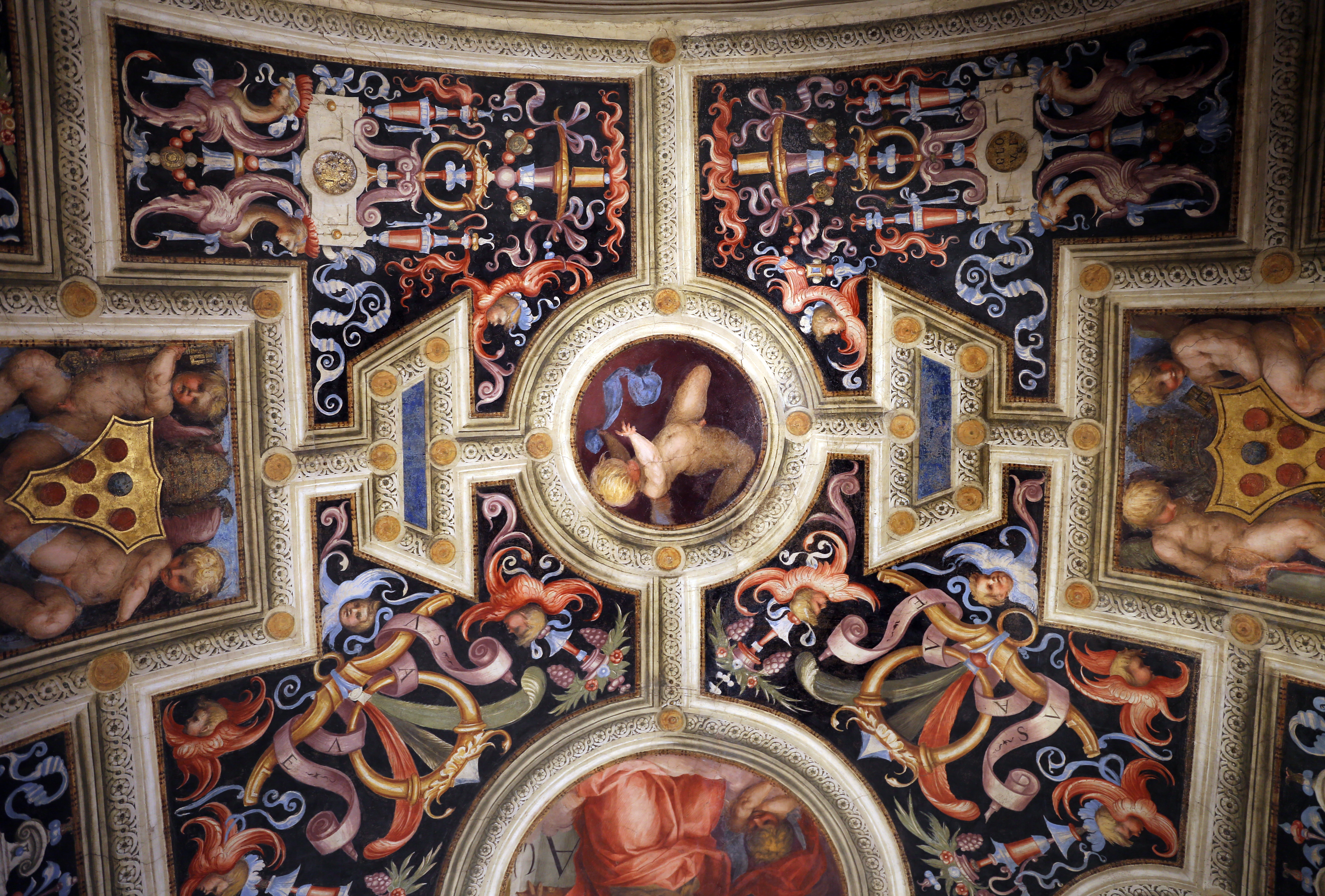
- Grotesques on the vault of the Cappella dei Papi in Santa Maria Novella, Florence
- Born: 1477; Florence, Republic of Florence
- Died: 12 May 1548 (aged 70–71); Florence, Republic of Florence
- Known for: Painting

Andrea Feltrini, called also Andrea di Cosimo, was a Florentine painter who excelled in grotesques. He was born on 12 March 1477, and died on 12 May 1548. His works are to be met with at Florence on the fronts of houses, on walls, and on ceilings. He is called by the first name, from his having been a scholar of Morto da Feltre, and by the second from his having studied art under Cosimo Roselli.
