= Pietro Marescalchi =

Italian painter

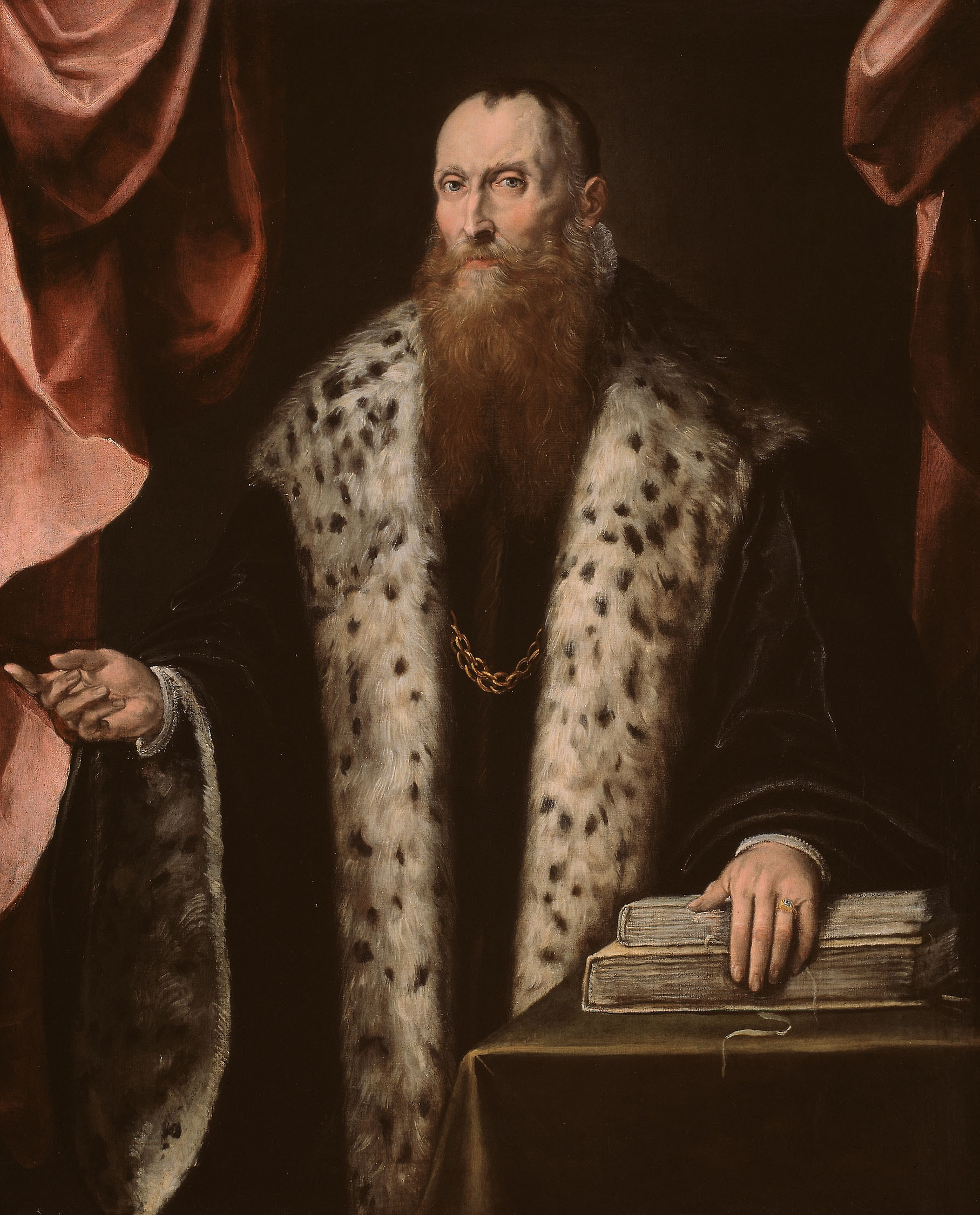

Pietro Marescalchi (Italian pronunciation: [ˈpjɛːtro mareˈskalki]; 1522–1589) or de Marascalchi was an Italian painter of the Renaissance, active near his hometown of Feltre in the Veneto. He is also referred to as Pietro de' Mariscalchi or Lo Spada. He is described as a more provincial reflection of the Mannerist style of Jacopo Bassano. He studied locally under Pietro Luzzi and perhaps under Morto da Feltre. He mainly painted for local churches.
