= Panfilo Castaldi =

Italian physician

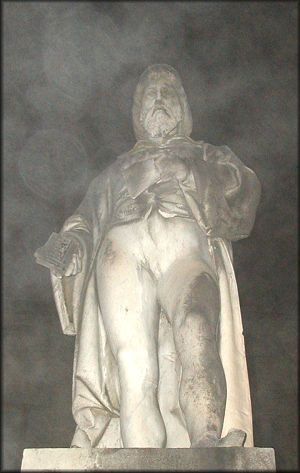

Panfilo Castaldi (c. 1398 – c. 1490) was an Italian physician and "master of the art of printing", to whom local tradition attributes the invention of moveable type. He was born in Feltre but spent most of his life working in Milan.

The story, as it has circulated through the centuries in Feltre, is that Castaldi was given examples of early Chinese block printing by Marco Polo, with which he experimented, eventually producing modern type. The story was largely unknown outside of Lombardy until it was reported in the 19th century by Robert Curzon, Baron Zouche, a diplomat. As Curzon tells it, Castaldi began with glass stamps made at Murano and eventually developed wooden printing blocks which he used in a printing press in Venice in 1426. This would have been several years before Johann Gutenberg's first experiments with metal type in the early 1430s. Curzon stresses the connection to Marco Polo, arguing that Castaldi's (undated) early work closely resembles Chinese printing, and also stresses Gutenberg's acquaintance with Venetian printing, thus suggesting that European printing did not emerge distinctly from the Chinese analogues but in imitation (a frequently debated question in any case).

Since no more recent scholarship has suggested such an early date for Castaldi's printing, any relationship between Castaldi and Marco Polo, or any connection between Gutenberg and Northern Italy, the story has never received much credit outside of Feltre. In that city, however, it still attracts a fair amount of attention (the statue of Castaldi still stands) and was brought up once again on the occasion of Castaldi's sexcentennial in 1998; in a proposal for a municipal bill recognizing Castaldi, he was referred to as "il primo inventore dei caratteri mobili per la stampa" ("the first inventor of moveable type for printing"). What is clear is that by the 1470s Castaldi was a successful printer; there is a record of a print run of 300 copies of a Cicero epistle in 1471.

Panfilo Castaldi is the imprint of a 19th and 20th-century printing house in Feltre.
