= Johann Heinrich Acker =

German writer

- Born: 12 August 1647; Naumburg, Germany
- Died: 21 September 1719 (aged 72); Gotha, Germany
- Occupation: Writer

Johann Heinrich Acker (12 August 1647 – 21 September 1719) was a German writer. He sometimes wrote under the name of Melissander.

He was taught in his native city of Naumburg and at the regional school of Pforta (Schulpforta). Beginning in 1669, he studied in Jena where he became magister and adjunct of the philosophical faculty. In 1673 he became adjunct and pastor in Hausen near Gotha, and in 1689 he became superintendent and court chaplain in Blankenhain. He resigned in 1717 due to an illness and moved to Gotha, where he died in 1719.

== Publications ==
- Historia reformationis ecclesiasticae tempore primitivae ecclesiae, 1685, 1715, Jena.

== Sources ==
- Allgemeine Deutsche Biographie – online version at Wikisource
