= Philipp Reinhard Vitriarius =

German jurist

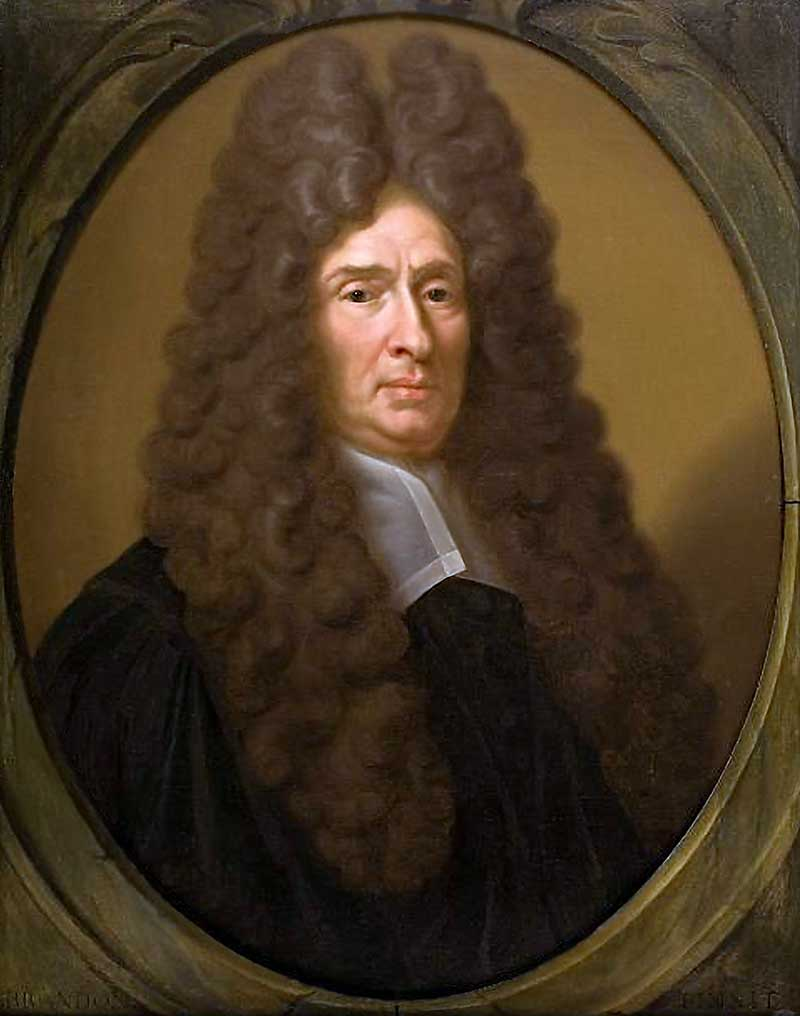
- Portrait of Philipp Reinhard Vitriarius in Leiden's rector's hall, by Jan Hendrik Brandon
- Born: 17 February 1647; Oppenheim
- Died: 30 July 1720 (aged 73); Leiden

Philipp Reinhard Vitriarius (17 February 1647 – 30 July 1720) was a jurist from Germany.

Vitriarius was born in Oppenheim and after his studies became a professor at Leiden University where his portrait hangs in the Rector's hall. His son Johann Jacob Vitriarius also studied there and took his place as professor, eventually publishing his writings in several volumes. For example: Philipus Reinhardus Vitrarius, Institutiones Juris Publici Romano-Germanici, (Lugd. Bataw.: Petrum Vander, 1686)

Vitriarius died in Leiden.
