= Jusepa Vaca =

Spanish stage actress

Jusepa Vaca (c. 1589-1653) was a Spanish stage actress, known as "la Gallarda". She belonged to the echelon of the most famous and popular performers of her era, and was celebrated by artists such as Lope de Vega and Luis Vélez de Guevara. She was one of the most famed Spanish actresses of her time.

Her mother was the actress Mariana Vaca, and her father was the playwright Juan Ruiz de Mendi.

She starred in the play La Serrana de la Vera in 1613. The play had been written specifically for her by playwright Luis Vélez de Guevara.
