= Albert Urrea =

Spanish footballer

Personal information
- Full name: Albert Urrea Baró
- Date of birth: 1 March 1987 (age 39)
- Place of birth: Tremp, Spain
- Height: 1.70 m (5 ft 7 in)
- Position: Midfielder

Youth career
- 2002–2006: Lleida

Senior career*
Years	Team	Apps	(Gls)
2005–2010	Lleida	92	(5)
2010–2011	Alicante	32	(1)
2011–2012	Ontinyent	33	(1)
2013	UCAM Murcia	4	(0)
2013–2015	Formentera	65	(4)
Total		226	(11)
- * Club domestic league appearances and goals

Albert Urrea Baró (born 1 March 1987) is a Spanish former footballer who played as a midfielder.

== Club career ==
Born in Tremp, Lleida, Catalonia, Urrea started his career at local club UE Lleida. On 12 June 2005 he made his debut for the first team, playing 18 minutes in a 1–0 Segunda División away loss against Real Murcia.

The following season, which ended in relegation to the Segunda División B, Urrea added another substitute appearance. He continued his career in the third tier the following years, with Lleida, Alicante CF, Ontinyent CF and UCAM Murcia CF.
