= Johann Wolfgang Jäger =

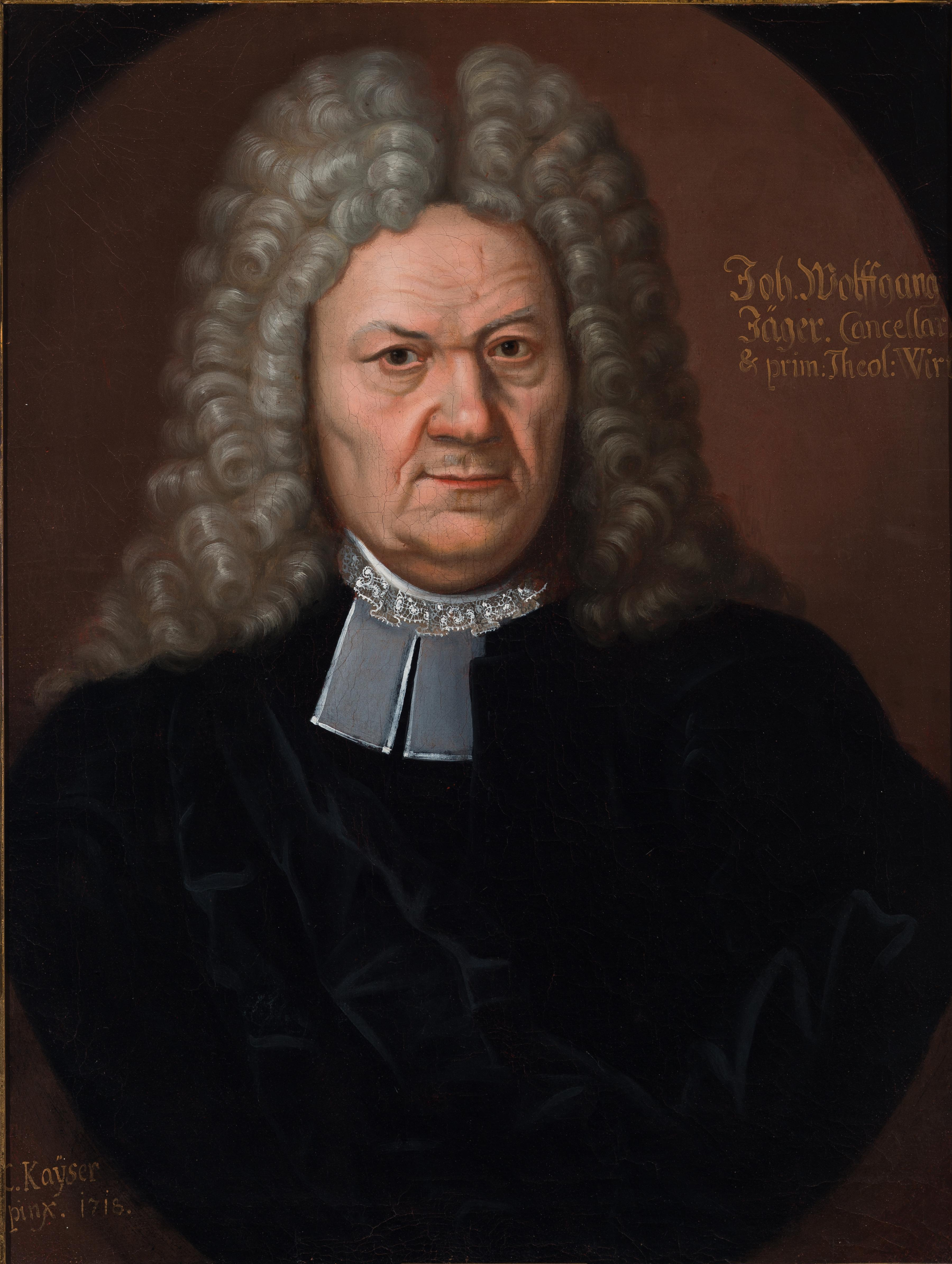
Johann Wolfgang Jäger

Johann Wolfgang Jäger (17 March 1647 – 20 April 1720) was a German professor of Protestant theology and chancellor of the University of Tübingen. He was born in Stuttgart and died in Tübingen.

== Life ==
At the age of 17, Johann Wolfgang Jäger began his university studies in philology, philosophy, and Protestant theology at the University of Tübingen.

He became a tutor for the eldest Prince Carl Maximilian, and also for his brother Georg Friedrich in 1676, the son of Duke Eberhard III of the Duchy of Württemberg. In 1680, he received the associate professorship of geography and Latin, and in 1681 the full professorship of Greek at Tübingen. In 1684, he became an instructor of practical philosophy and overseer of the Tübinger Stift.

In 1702 he was appointed chancellor of the University of Tübingen. There he was a professor of Protestant theology and provost of the collegiate church, until 1709 when he became abbot of the Adelberg Abbey and General Superintendent in the Duchy of Württemberg.

Jäger earned his achievements in the academic world primarily in his fight against mystical Chiliastic teachers such as Jakob Böhme, Gottfried Arnold, and Johann Wilhelm Petersen. Jäger relied on the rationalist system of natural law of Hugo Grotius. Because of this, he helped to bring new ideas to the University of Tübingen. Though he had personal respect for Philipp Spener, he believed that Pietism and Separatism were dangers to theological doctrine, and he ardently fought against them.

His theological textbook, Compendium Theologiae Positivae (1702), was officially adopted for use in the Duchy of Württemberg in 1702, replacing earlier textbooks by theologians such as Matthias Hafenreffer and Johann Georg Sigwart. This work solidified orthodox doctrine by adopting Federalism and connecting closely with Biblical theology. This helped to usher in a new spirit to the faculty of the University of Tübingen.

== Publications ==
- „Systema theologicum dogmatico-polemicum“ (1725, 4)
- „Compendium Theologiae … pro scholis in Ducatu Wirtembergico“
- „Hist. eccl. c. parallelismo profanae“ (1692, expanded in 1709 und 1717) „ex speciali Seren. Würtem. Ducis jussu scripta“
- „Defensio Imperatoris Josphi contra curiae Romanae bullas“ (1709)
- „De Bened. Spinozae vita et doctrina“ (Dissertation, 1710).

== Sources ==
- A. Fr. Bök, Geschichte der Universität Tübingen, S. 141–42. Württemberg. Nebenstunden I, 1–71 (nach einem von J. selbst 1718 geschriebenen Lebenslaufe und Verzeichniß seiner bis dahin verfassten Schriften). Jöcher. Saxi Onomast. V, 413–14.
