= Morto da Feltre =

Italian painter

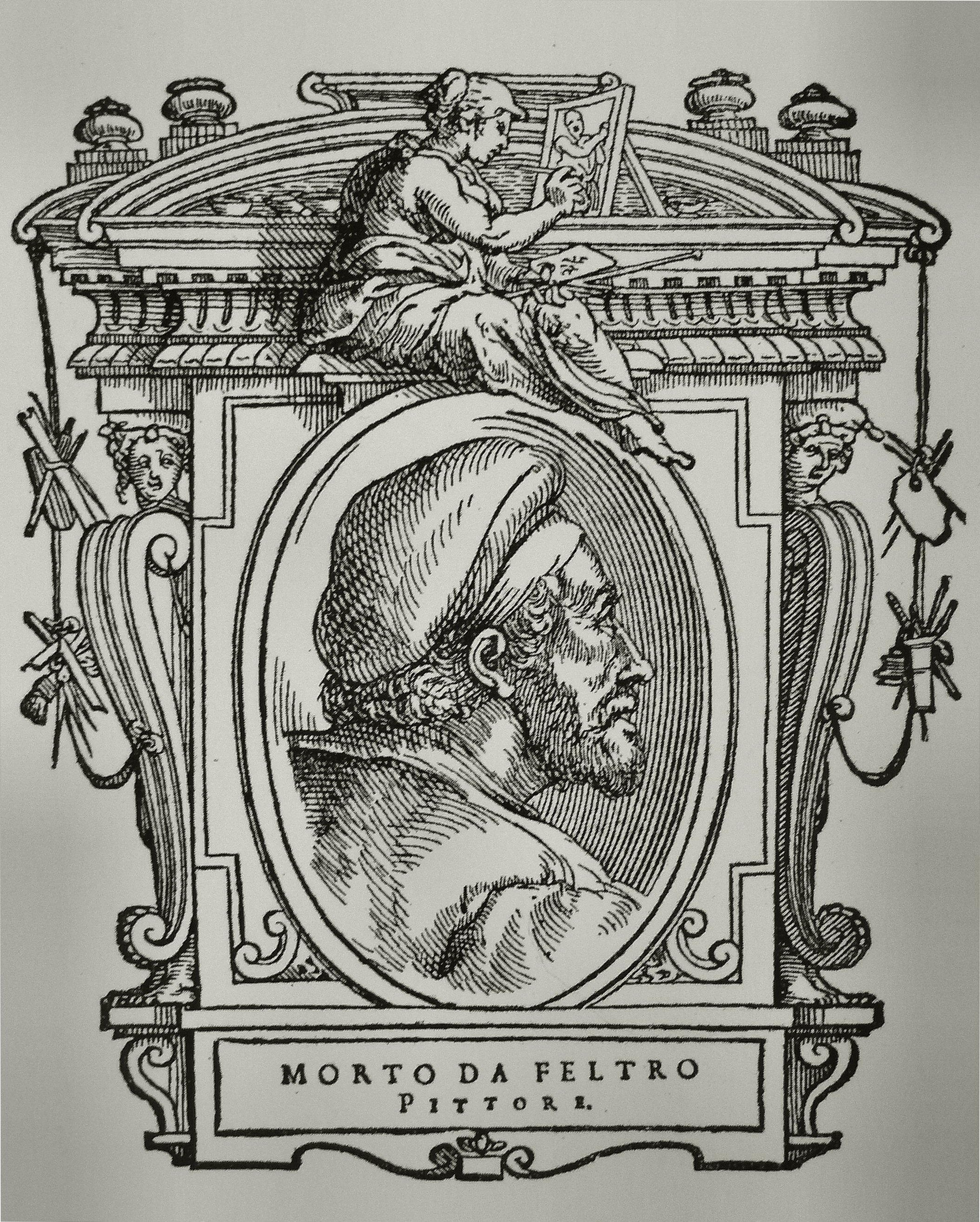
Morto da Feltre.

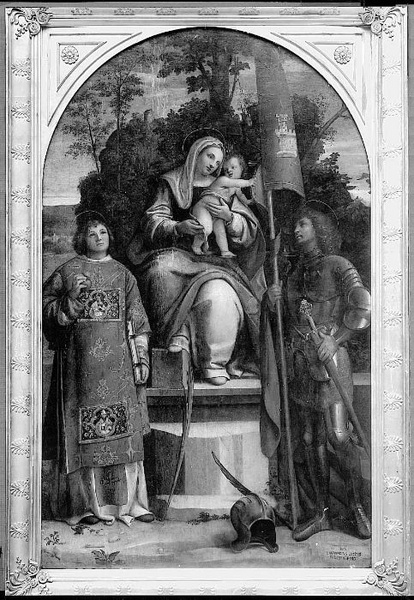
Enthroned Madonna and Saints

Morto da Feltre was an Italian painter of the Venetian school who worked at the close of the 15th century and beginning of the 16th.

== Biography ==
His real name appears to have been Pietro Luzzo, Pietro Luci or Lorenzo Luzzo; he is also known by the name Zarato or Zarotto, either from the place of his death or because his father, a surgeon, was in Zara during the son's childhood: whether he was termed "Morto" (dead) from his joyless temperament is a disputed point.

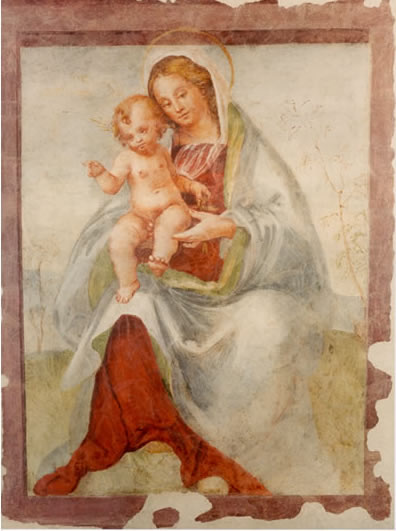
Virgin and Child, Civic Museum of Feltre

Born in Feltre (province of Belluno), he may probably have studied painting first in Venice and surroundings, initially an assistant of Pinturicchio. It is claimed by Vasari that at an early age he went to Rome, and investigated the ancient, especially the subterranean remains, and thence to Pozzuoli, where he painted from the decorations of antique crypts or grotte. The style of fanciful arabesque which he formed for himself from these studies gained the name of "grottesche", whence comes the term grotesque; not, indeed, that Morto was the first painter of arabesque in the Italian Renaissance, for art of this kind had, been developed, both in painting and in sculpture, towards 1480, but he may have powerfully aided its diffusion southwards.

His works were received with much favor in Rome. He afterwards went to Florence, and painted some fine grotesques in the Palazzo Pubblico and trained Andrea di Cosimo. Returning to Venice towards 1505, he assisted Giorgione in painting the Fondaco dei Tedeschi, and seems to have remained with him till 1510. It may have been in 1515 that Morto returned to his native Feltre, then in a very ruinous condition from the ravages of war in 1509. There he executed various works, including some frescoes, still partly extant, and considered to be almost worthy of the hand of Raphael, in the loggia beside the church of Santo Stefano. He may have met Giovanni da Udine.

Towards the age of forty-five, Morto, unquiet and dissatisfied, abandoned painting and took to soldiering in the service of the Venetian republic. He was made captain of a troop of two hundred men; and fighting valorously, he is said to have died at Zara in Dalmatia, in 1519. This story, and especially the date of it, are questionable: there is some reason to think that Morto was painting as late as 1522. One of his pictures is in the Berlin museum, an allegorical subject of Peace and War. Andrea Feltrini was his pupil and assistant as a decorative painter.

He is cited in Giorgio Vasari's Vite or biographies of the artists.

== Sources ==
- Freedberg, Sydney J. (1993). Pelican History of Art (ed.). Painting in Italy, 1500-1600. Penguin Books Ltd. p. 675.
- Ticozzi, Stefano (1813). Storia dei letterati e degli artisti del Dipartimento della Piave. Francesco Antonio Tissi, Belluno. p. XIII.
- Manescalchi, Roberto (2004). Le Grottesche del Morto. Bollettino degli Ingegneri, Firenze.
