= Francisco Ximénez de Urrea =

Spanish historian and writer

Francisco Ximénez de Urrea (January 28, 1589 – January 6, 1647) was a Spanish historian and writer. He was born in Épila, Aragon, and was appointed Chronicler of Aragon in 1631 following an agreement by the Provincial Council of the Kingdom.
