= 1670 =

1670 in various calendars
- Gregorian calendar: 1670; MDCLXX
- Ab urbe condita: 2423
- Armenian calendar: 1119; ԹՎ ՌՃԺԹ
- Assyrian calendar: 6420
- Balinese saka calendar: 1591–1592
- Bengali calendar: 1076–1077
- Berber calendar: 2620
- English Regnal year: 21 Cha. 2 – 22 Cha. 2
- Buddhist calendar: 2214
- Burmese calendar: 1032
- Byzantine calendar: 7178–7179
- Chinese calendar: 己酉年 (Earth Rooster); 4367 or 4160 — to — 庚戌年 (Metal Dog); 4368 or 4161
- Coptic calendar: 1386–1387
- Discordian calendar: 2836
- Ethiopian calendar: 1662–1663
- Hebrew calendar: 5430–5431
- Hindu calendars
- Vikram Samvat: 1726–1727
- Shaka Samvat: 1591–1592
- Kali Yuga: 4770–4771
- Holocene calendar: 11670
- Igbo calendar: 670–671
- Iranian calendar: 1048–1049
- Islamic calendar: 1080–1081
- Japanese calendar: Kanbun 10 (寛文１０年)
- Javanese calendar: 1592–1593
- Julian calendar: Gregorian minus 10 days
- Korean calendar: 4003
- Minguo calendar: 242 before ROC 民前242年
- Nanakshahi calendar: 202
- Thai solar calendar: 2212–2213
- Tibetan calendar: ས་མོ་བྱ་ལོ་ (female Earth-Bird); 1796 or 1415 or 643 — to — ལྕགས་ཕོ་ཁྱི་ལོ་ (male Iron-Dog); 1797 or 1416 or 644

1670 (MDCLXX) was a common year starting on Wednesday of the Gregorian calendar and a common year starting on Saturday of the Julian calendar, the 1670th year of the Common Era (CE) and Anno Domini (AD) designations, the 670th year of the 2nd millennium, the 70th year of the 17th century, and the 1st year of the 1670s decade. As of the start of 1670, the Gregorian calendar was 10 days ahead of the Julian calendar, which remained in localized use until 1923.

== Events ==
=== January–March ===
- January 17 – Raphael Levy, a Jewish resident of the city of Metz in France, is burned at the stake after being accused of the September 25 abduction and ritual murder of a child who had disappeared from the village of Glatigny. The prosecutor applies to King Louis XIV for an order expelling all 95 Jewish families from Metz, but the king refuses.
- January 27 – The Muslim emperor Aurangzeb of the Mughal Empire in India issues an order for the destruction of all Hindu temples and schools in the empire, including the Keshvadeva Temple in Mathura.
- February 4 – The Battle of Sinhagad takes place in India (in the modern-day Maharashtra state) as the Maratha Empire army, led by Tanaji Malusare, leads an assault on the Kondhana Fortress that had been captured by the Mughal Empire. Tanaji, called "The Lion" by his followers, captures the fortress by guiding the successful scaling of the walls of the fortress with ladders created from rope, but is killed in the battle. The Maratha emperor Shivaji orders the fortress named Sinhagad, the Marathi language words for "Lion's Fort".
- February 9 – Christian V becomes the king of Denmark-Norway upon the death of his father, Frederick III.
- February 27 – The royal wedding in Poland, between King Michal Wisniowiecki (who is also the Grand Duke of Lithuania) and Eleonore of Austria (daughter of the late Ferdinand III, Holy Roman Emperor), with ceremonies taking place at the Denhoff Palace in Kruszyna.
- March 7 – Oliver Plunkett, the Roman Catholic Archbishop of Armagh since 1669, is allowed to return to Ireland for the first time in more than 22 years, after a new policy of tolerance of Catholicism is enacted in England. Plunkett had departed for Rome in 1647 during the Cromwellian conquest of Ireland. Executed in 1681 on false charges of plotting an invasion of Ireland, Plunkett is canonized as a saint of the Roman Catholic Church in 1975.
- March 15 – The first English settlers arrive at the modern-day U.S. state of South Carolina, at this time the Province of Clarendon carved out of the Province of Carolina, and construct a settlement at Albemarle Point on the Ashley River.
- March 18 – Petar Zrinski, the Viceroy of Croatia within the Holy Roman Empire, issues a proclamation urging Croatians to rebel against the Habsburg rulers. The uprising fails and Zrinski and his brother-in-law, Krsto Frankopan, are quickly arrested. Both are beheaded in Vienna on April 30, 1671.
- March 31 – The British warship HMS Sapphire is wrecked beyond repair when her captain, John Pearce, orders the ship to be run aground at Sicily while fleeing what he believes to be four Algerian pirate ships, rather than attempting to fight. The ships turn out to have been friendly, and Pearce and his lieutenant, Andrew Logan, are court-martialed for their cowardice and executed on September 17.

=== April–June ===
- April 18 – King Christian V of Denmark fires Christoffer Gabel, who had been the corrupt chief adviser to King Frederick III, and replaces him with Peder Griffenfeld.
- April 29 – After more than four months, the papal conclave to elect a successor to the late Pope Clement IX selects Cardinal Emilio Altieri with 56 of the 59 votes. Altieri, 79 years old at the time, remains the oldest person ever to be elected pope. He announces that he will take the name of Pope Clement X in honor of Clement IX, who had made him a cardinal. He serves for six years until his death in 1676 shortly after his 86th birthday.
- May 2 – The Hudson's Bay Company is granted a royal charter in England with the jurisdiction to control administration and commerce in "Rupert's Land", governed for the crown by Rupert, Duke of Cumberland, the cousin of King Charles II. The land is a 1.5 million square mile area of what is now Canada around Hudson Bay. The area controlled covers all of the modern province of Manitoba, most of Saskatchewan, and significant portions of Alberta and Nunavut, as well as parts of what are now Ontario and Quebec, and parts of the U.S. states of Minnesota, North Dakota and Montana.
- May 23 – Cosimo III de' Medici becomes the Grand Duke of Tuscany, at the time an independent nation in Italy, upon the death of his father Ferdinando de' Medici.
- June 1 – At Dover, England, Charles II of England and Louis XIV of France sign the Secret Treaty of Dover, ending hostilities between their kingdoms. Louis will give Charles 200,000 pounds annually. In return Charles will relax the laws against Catholics, gradually re-Catholicise England, support French policy against the Dutch Republic (leading England into the Third Anglo-Dutch War), and convert to Catholicism himself. The treaty is ratified three days later. The terms will not become public until the early 19th century. Louis is represented in the negotiations by Charles' sister Princess Henrietta, Duchess of Orléans, who dies suddenly soon after returning to France.
- June 9 – Taking advantage of a monsoon, the Maratha Empire's Shivaji orders an attack on areas that had been turned over to the Mughal Empire and its emperor Aurangazeb in 1665. Within 15 days, the cities of Pune, Baramati, Supi and Indapur, along with the Rohida fort, are recaptured by the Maratha Army.
- June 10 – King Louis XIV of France issues an ordinance prohibiting the French colonies in the Americas from trading with any other nation except France.
- June 15 – The first stone of Fort Ricasoli is laid down in Malta.

=== July–September ===
- July 11 – Representatives of England (led by King Charles II) and Denmark (led by King Christian V) sign a treaty of alliance and commerce, the Treaty of Copenhagen.
- July 18 (July 8, O.S.) – The Treaty of Madrid, also known as the Godolphin Treaty, is signed between England and Spain to formally end hostilities left over from the Anglo-Spanish War, in the Caribbean, that ended ten years earlier. For the first time, Spain acknowledges that it is not entitled to all territory in the Americas west of Brazil, as provided by the 1493 line of demarcation decreed by Pope Alexander VI, and by the 1494 Treaty of Tordesillas between Spain and Portugal. Spain acknowledges that Jamaica and the Cayman Islands are English possessions.
- August 17 – A joint fleet of warships from England (commanded by Commodore Richard Beach on HMS Hampshire) and from the Dutch Republic (led by Admiral Willem Joseph van Ghent on Spiegel) rescue 250 Christian slaves and then sink six Algerian pirate ships in a battle in the Mediterranean Sea off of the coast of Morocco at Cape Spartel.
- August 26 – The Parliament of France enacts a uniform criminal code for the nation with the passage of the Criminal Ordinance of 1670, which takes effect on January 1. The code remains in force until October 9, 1789, when it is abrogated during the French Revolution.
- mid-August – Three Spanish frigates from Spanish Florida, sailing from St. Augustine and under the command of Juan Menendez Marques, arrive at Charleston harbor, preparing to attack the English settlement in South Carolina. The English settlers have been warned in advance by Indians who had found out about the invasion. Because of a storm, and the English preparations for a siege, Captain Menendez abandons the colony without attempting an attack.
- September 5 – William Penn and William Mead are found not guilty of violating the Conventicles Act 1670, after a five day jury trial in London. The two had been arrested on August 14 in front of a meeting house Gracechurch Street after preaching a Quaker sermon outside following a ban on preaching indoors. The defiance by the jury leads to the landmark English decision in Bushel's Case.

=== October–December ===
- October 3 – In India, Chhatrapati Shivaji maharaj, the ruler of the Maratha Empire, leads an attack on the British settlement at Surat near Bombay. British Governor Gerald Aungier secures the British fortress at Surat and saves the lives and property of British citizens.
- October 14 – Le Bourgeois gentilhomme, a five-act comedy and ballet authored by Molière, is given its first performance, presented before King Louis XIV at the Château de Chambord. Public performances begin on November 23 at the Théâtre du Palais-Royal in Paris.
- October 18 – The Battle of Kitombo takes place in southwest Africa in Angola, when colonial soldiers of the Army of Portugal invade Soyo, an independent BaKongo kingdom, with the intent of annexing it to Portuguese West Africa. The 400 Portuguese troops, led by João Soares de Almeida, encounter a stiff resistance. Soyo's Estevao da Silva, whose army has the benefit of weapons supplied by the Dutch Republic, is joined in battle by troops from the neighboring Kingdom of Ngoyo on the other side of the Congo River. General Soares de Almeida is killed, and most of his troops die or are captured; Soyo's General da Silva is killed in the process of winning the battle. Because of the defeat, Portugal makes no further attempt to conquer Soyo or Ngoyo.
- November 24 – Louis XIV inaugurates the construction of Les Invalides, a veterans' hospital in Paris.
- December 15 – Henry Morgan, a Welsh privateer in English service, recaptures Santa Catalina Island, Colombia.
- December 27 – Henry Morgan captures Fort San Lorenzo, on Panama's Caribbean coast.
- December 31 – The expedition of John Narborough leaves Corral Bay having surveyed the coast and lost four hostages to the Spanish.

=== Date unknown ===
- Stenka Razin begins the rebellion of Cossacks in Russia.
- Niani, capital of the Mali Empire, is sacked by the Bambara people of the emerging Segou Empire.
- The first French settlers arrive on the Petite Côte of modern-day Senegal.

== Births ==
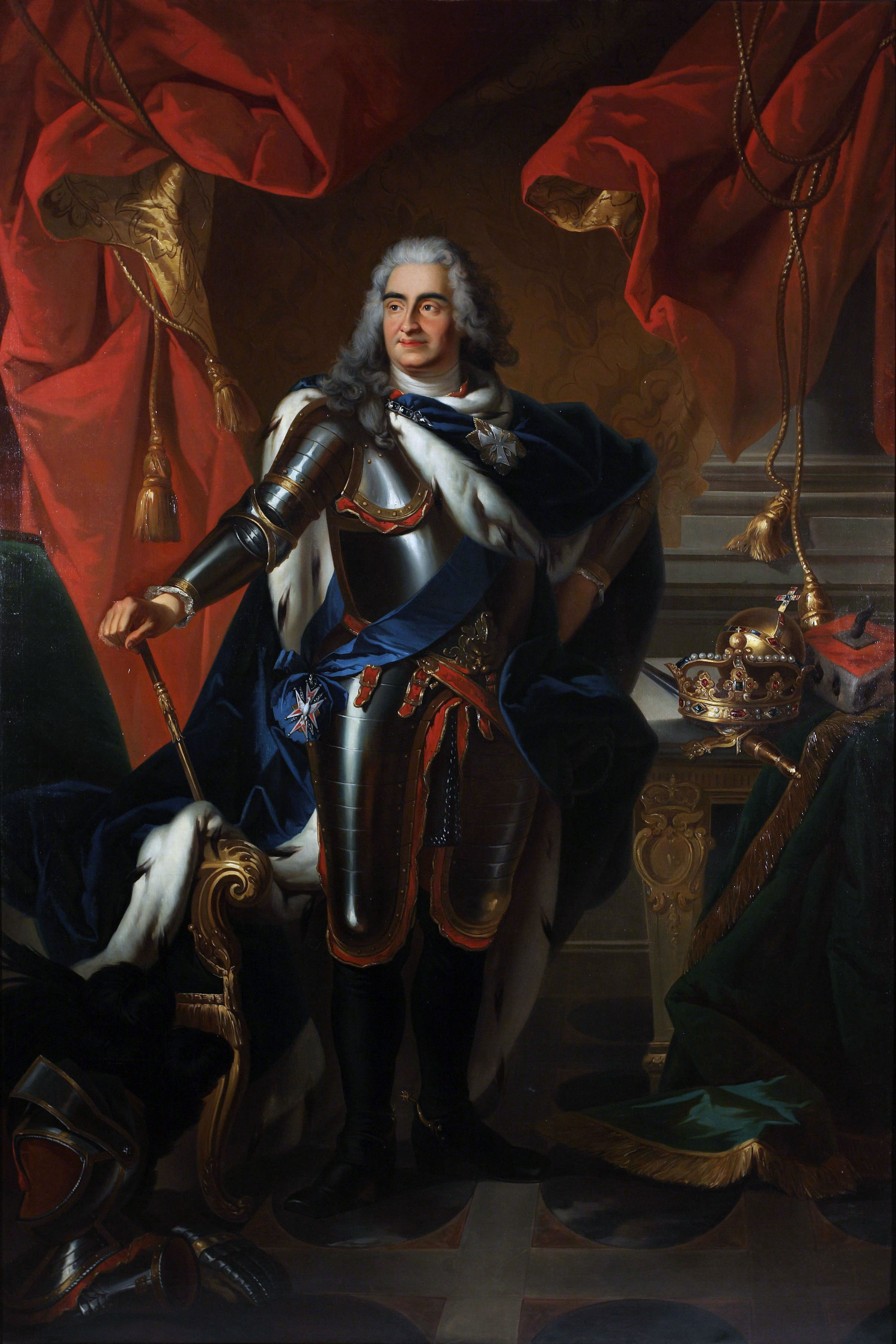
Augustus II the Strong

- January 24 – William Congreve, English playwright (d. 1729)
- February 25 – Maria Margarethe Kirch, German astronomer (d. 1720)
- February 28 – Benjamin Wadsworth, American president of Harvard University (d. 1737)
- May 8 – Charles Beauclerk, 1st Duke of St Albans, English soldier (d. 1726)
- May 12 – King Frederick Augustus I of Poland (d. 1733)
- June 22 – Eva von Buttlar, German mystic sectarian (d. 1721)
- July 18 – Giovanni Bononcini, Italian composer (d. 1747)
- July 19 – Richard Leveridge, English bass player and composer (d. 1758)
- August 21 – James FitzJames, 1st Duke of Berwick, French military commander (d. 1734)
- November 15 – Bernard Mandeville, Dutch-born economic philosopher (d. 1733)
- December 4 – John Aislabie, English politician, director of the South Sea Company (d. 1742)
- date unknown – Sultan Abdullah Khan Abdali, Persian Governor of Herat, Shah of Herat (d. 1721)

== Deaths ==
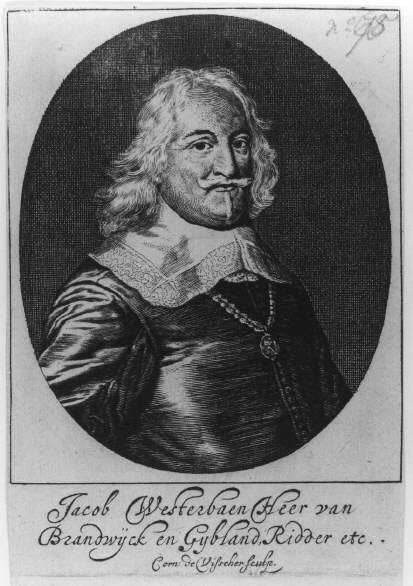
Jacob Westerbaen

- January 3 – George Monck, 1st Duke of Albemarle, English soldier (b. 1608)
- January 6
  - Sir Gilbert Gerard, 1st Baronet of Harrow on the Hill, English politician (b. 1587)
  - Charles of Sezze, Italian Franciscan friar and saint (b. 1613)
- January 21
  - Claude Duval, French-born highwayman (b. 1643)
  - Honorat de Bueil, seigneur de Racan, French aristocrat (b. 1589)
- January 25 – Nicholas Francis, Duke of Lorraine (b. 1609)
- February 9 – King Frederick III of Denmark (b. 1609)
- February 12 – Niklaus Dachselhofer, Swiss politician (b. 1595)
- February 17 – Elizabeth Barnard, granddaughter of William Shakespeare (b. 1608)
- March 1 – Giovanna Maria Bonomo, beatified Italian Catholic nun (b. 1606)
- March 2 – François-Henri Salomon de Virelade, French lawyer (b. 1620)
- March 10
  - Johann Glauber, German chemist (b. 1604)
  - Ludovicus a S. Carolo, French monk (b. 1608)
- March 15 – John Davenport, Connecticut pioneer (b. 1597)
- April – Ahom King Swargadeo Chakradhwaj Singha or Supangmung of Assam, India
- April 5 – Leonora Baroni, Italian singer (b. 1611)
- April 12 – George, Duke of Brunswick-Lüneburg (b. 1582)
- April 23 – Loreto Vittori, Italian singer and composer (b. 1600)
- May 10 – Claude Vignon, French painter (b. 1593)
- May 21
  - Niccolò Zucchi, Italian astronomer and physicist (b. 1586)
  - Giovanni Andrea Sirani, Italian painter (b. 1610)
- May 19 – Ferdinando Ughelli, Italian Cistercian monk, church historian (b. 1595)
- May 23 – Ferdinando II de' Medici, Grand Duke of Tuscany (b. 1610)
- May 31 – Josceline Percy, 11th Earl of Northumberland, English noble (b. 1644)
- June 12 – Hasanuddin of Gowa, 16th Ruler of the Sultanate of Gowa (b. 1631)
- June 25 – Lorens von der Linde, Swedish field marshal (b. 1610)
- June 27 – Thomas Bennet, English civil lawyer (b. 1592)
- June 28 – Hendrik Martenszoon Sorgh, Dutch painter (b. 1610)
- June 30
  - Henrietta, Duchess of Orléans, English and French princess (b. 1644)
  - Frederick, Prince of Anhalt-Harzgerode (b. 1613)
- July 16 – Abraham Diepraam, Dutch painter (b. 1622)
- August 24 – William Neile, English mathematician and founder member of the Royal Society (b. 1637)
- September 11 – Jeanne Chezard de Matel, French mystic (b. 1596)
- September 16 – William Penn, English admiral and politician (b. 1621)
- September 26 – Abraham Teniers, Flemish painter (b. 1629)
- September 28 – Alexander Morus, Franco-Scottish Calvinist preacher (b. 1616)
- August 10 – Richard Ottley, English politician (b. 1626)
- October 3 – Sir Henry Yelverton, 2nd Baronet, English Member of Parliament (b. 1633)
- October 27 – Vavasor Powell, Welsh non-conformist leader (b. 1617)
- November 8 – Emmanuel, Prince of Anhalt-Köthen, German prince of the House of Ascania (b. 1631)
- November 15 – Comenius, Czech writer (b. 1592)
- November 21 – William VII, Landgrave of Hesse-Kassel (b. 1651)
- November 22 – Landgravine Sophie of Hesse-Kassel, Countess of Schaumburg-Lippe (b. 1615)
- December 4 – Emilie of Oldenburg-Delmenhorst, Regent of Schwarzburg-Rudolstadt (1646–1662) (b. 1614)
- date unknown – Alena Arzamasskaia, Russian rebel leader (b. year unknown)
