= 1620 =

1620 in various calendars
- Gregorian calendar: 1620; MDCXX
- Ab urbe condita: 2373
- Armenian calendar: 1069; ԹՎ ՌԿԹ
- Assyrian calendar: 6370
- Balinese saka calendar: 1541–1542
- Bengali calendar: 1026–1027
- Berber calendar: 2570
- English Regnal year: 17 Ja. 1 – 18 Ja. 1
- Buddhist calendar: 2164
- Burmese calendar: 982
- Byzantine calendar: 7128–7129
- Chinese calendar: 己未年 (Earth Goat); 4317 or 4110 — to — 庚申年 (Metal Monkey); 4318 or 4111
- Coptic calendar: 1336–1337
- Discordian calendar: 2786
- Ethiopian calendar: 1612–1613
- Hebrew calendar: 5380–5381
- Hindu calendars
- Vikram Samvat: 1676–1677
- Shaka Samvat: 1541–1542
- Kali Yuga: 4720–4721
- Holocene calendar: 11620
- Igbo calendar: 620–621
- Iranian calendar: 998–999
- Islamic calendar: 1029–1030
- Japanese calendar: Genna 6 (元和６年)
- Javanese calendar: 1540–1542
- Julian calendar: Gregorian minus 10 days
- Korean calendar: 3953
- Minguo calendar: 292 before ROC 民前292年
- Nanakshahi calendar: 152
- Thai solar calendar: 2162–2163
- Tibetan calendar: ས་མོ་ལུག་ལོ་ (female Earth-Sheep); 1746 or 1365 or 593 — to — ལྕགས་ཕོ་སྤྲེ་ལོ་ (male Iron-Monkey); 1747 or 1366 or 594

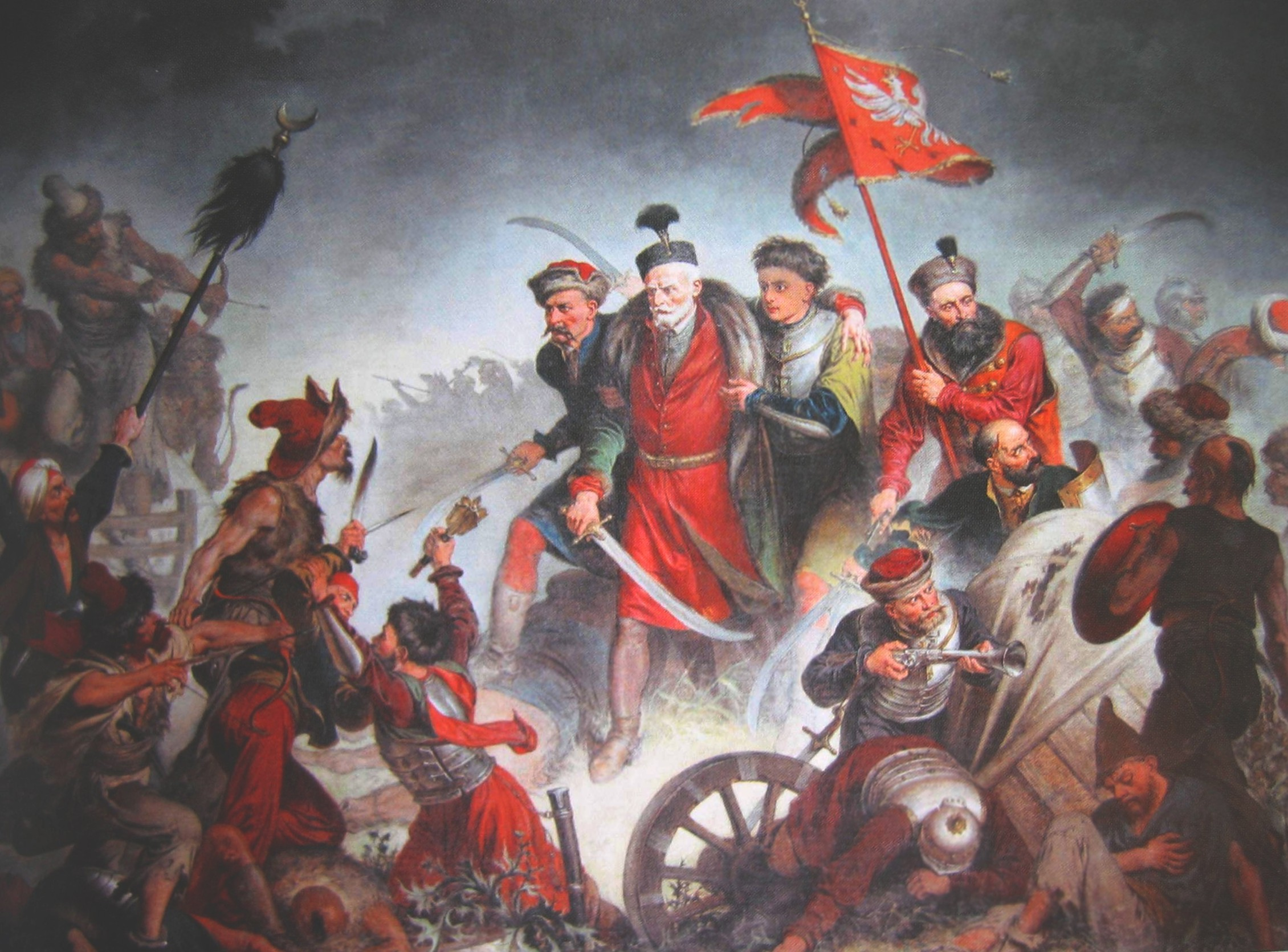
October 7: Polish Hetman Żółkiewski killed at Battle of Cecora.

1620 (MDCXX) was a leap year starting on Wednesday of the Gregorian calendar and a leap year starting on Saturday of the Julian calendar, the 1620th year of the Common Era (CE) and Anno Domini (AD) designations, the 620th year of the 2nd millennium, the 20th year of the 17th century, and the 1st year of the 1620s decade. As of the start of 1620, the Gregorian calendar was 10 days ahead of the Julian calendar, which remained in localized use until 1923.

== Events ==
November 8: The Battle of White Mountain.

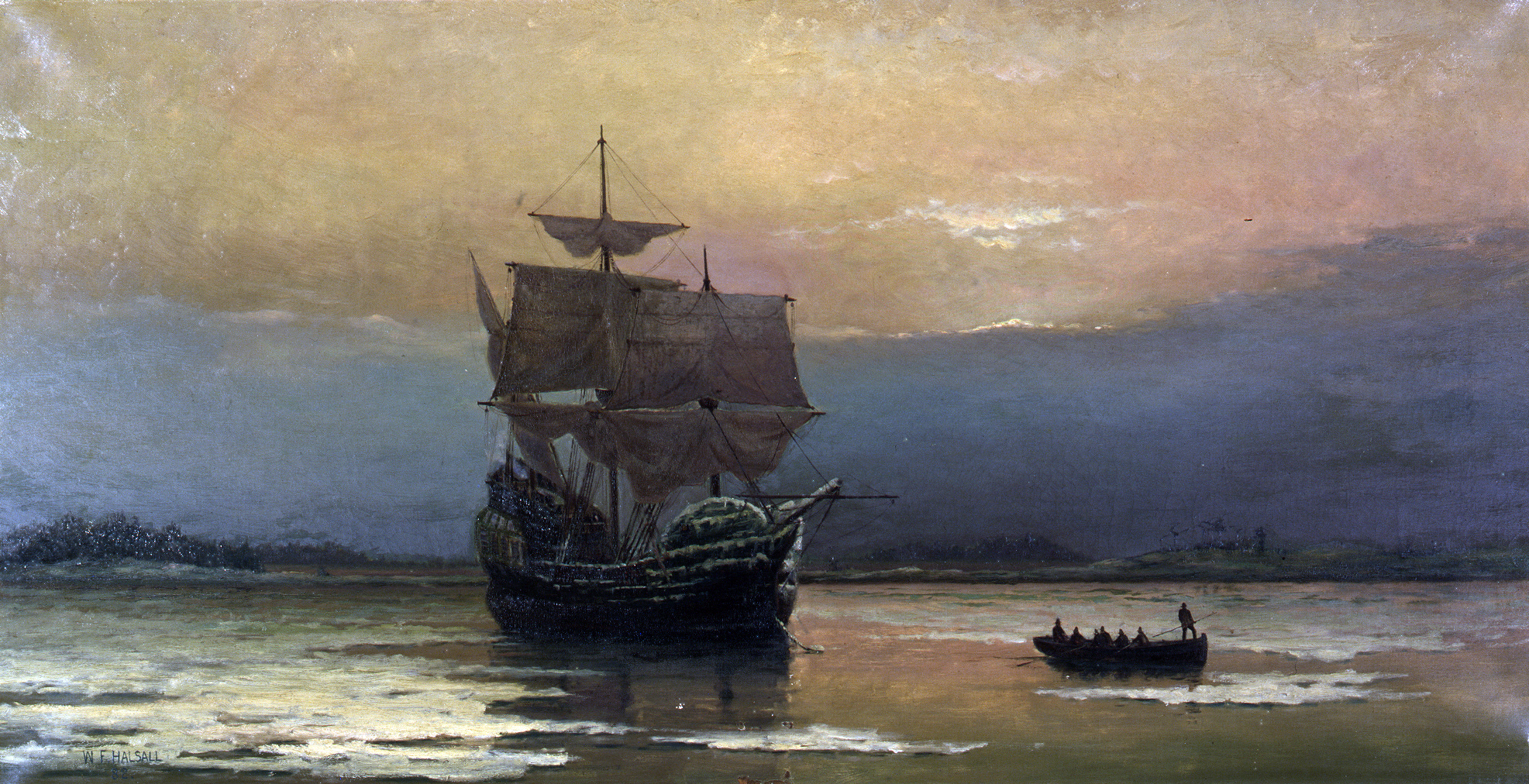
November 21: The Mayflower arrives at Cape Cod.

=== January–March ===
- January 7 – Ben Jonson's play News from the New World Discovered in the Moon is given its first performance, a presentation to King James VI and I. In addition to dialogue about actual observations made by telescope of the Moon, the play includes a fanciful discussion of a lunar civilisation, featuring a dance by the "Volatees", the lunar race.
- January 22 – In France, Charles d'Albert, duc de Luynes, and his wife, the Duchess Marie de Rohan, sign a marriage contract on behalf of their one-year-old daughter to be engaged to the year-old son of Charles, Duke of Guise.
- January 26 – Karan Singh II becomes the new ruler of the Kingdom of Mewar (in the modern-day state of Rajasthan in India) upon the death of his father, the Maharana Amar Singh I.
- February 4 – Prince Bethlen Gabor secures a peace treaty with Ferdinand II, Holy Roman Emperor.
- March 22 – King Karma Phuntsok Namgyal of Tibet dies of smallpox after a reign of less than two years, after Ngawang Namgyal of Bhutan casts a tantric spell over him.
- March 24 – English sailor Owen Fitzpen is captured by Turkish pirates while on a trading voyage in the Mediterranean Sea and sold into slavery. He remains a slave in North Africa for seven years until he and 10 other slaves are able to take over a Turkish ship and sail back to Europe.

=== April–June ===
- April 1 – Ferdinand II, Holy Roman Emperor and former King of Bohemia, sends a two-month ultimatum directing King Frederick of Bohemia (who has usurped the throne in the modern-day Czech Republic) to leave Bohemia by June 1. Frederick refuses to depart his capital at Prague.
- April 7 – The earliest recorded earthquake in South Africa occurs at Robben Island.
- April 20 – Mian Shahul Mouhammed Kalhoro begins his reign at Karachi as the king of Sindh, in modern-day Pakistan, and rules until 1657.
- May 17 – The first merry-go-round is seen at a fair in Philippapolis, Turkey.
- June 3 – The oldest stone church in French North America, Notre-Dame-des-Anges, is begun at Quebec City in modern-day Canada.

=== July–September ===
- July 3
  - Under the terms of the Treaty of Ulm, the Protestant Union declares neutrality and ceases to support Frederick V of the Palatinate's claim to the throne of Bohemia.
  - Captain Andrew Shilling, on behalf of the English Honourable East India Company, lays claim to Table Bay in Africa.
- July 25 (July 15 OS) – The armed merchant ship Mayflower embarks about 65 emigrants for New England at or near her home port of Rotherhithe on the Thames east of London; about July 29 (July 19 OS) she anchors in Southampton Water.
- August 1 (July 22 OS) – The ship Speedwell departs Delfshaven with English separatist Puritans from Leiden bound to rendezvous with the Mayflower; on August 5 (July 26 OS) she anchors in Southampton Water.
- August 7
  - The mother of astronomer Johannes Kepler is arrested for witchcraft.
  - In a battle at Les Ponts-de-Cé in France, King Louis XIII defeats troops led by his mother, Marie de' Medici.
- August 15 (probable date; August 5 OS) – Mayflower and Speedwell depart together from Southampton, but are forced to put back into Dartmouth, Devon, for repairs to a leak in the latter ship on August 22 or 23 (August 12 or 13 OS).
- September 2 (August 23 OS) – Mayflower and Speedwell depart together from Dartmouth; they are well out into the Atlantic when the Speedwell is again found to be leaking.
- September 7 (August 28 OS)
  - Mayflower and Speedwell return again to England, anchoring at Plymouth; the latter ship is given up as a participant in the voyage and on September 12 (September 2 OS) departs for London, most of her passengers and stores having been transferred to the Mayflower.
  - The Finnish town of Kokkola (Swedish: Karleby) is founded by King Gustavus Adolphus of Sweden.
- September 16 (September 6 OS) – Mayflower departs from Plymouth in England on her third attempt to cross the Atlantic. The Pilgrims on board comprise 41 "saints" (English separatists largely from Holland), 40 "strangers" (largely secular planters from London), 23 servants and hired workers, together with c. 30 crew.
- September 17–October 7 – Battle of Cecora: The Ottoman Empire defeats Polish–Lithuanian Commonwealth–Moldavian troops.

=== October–December ===
- October 6 – Battle of Amedamit in Gojjam, Ethiopia: The Roman Catholic Ras Sela Kristos, half-brother of Emperor Susenyos, crushes a group of rebels, who are opposed to Susenyos' pro-Catholic beliefs.
- November 3 – The Great Patent is granted to Plymouth Colony.
- November 8 – Thirty Years' War: Battle of White Mountain – Catholic Habsburg forces are victorious over Bohemian rebels two hours from Prague.
- November 21 (November 11 OS) – The Mayflower arrives inside the tip of Cape Cod (named from the Concord voyage of 1602), at what becomes known as Provincetown Harbor, with the Pilgrims and Planters; 41 Plymouth Colony settlers sign the Mayflower Compact, the first governing document of the colony, on board the ship.
- November 25 – The wedding of Gustav II Adolf and Maria Eleonora takes place in Sweden.
- December 21 – Plymouth Colony: William Bradford and the Mayflower Pilgrims land near what becomes known as Plymouth Rock, in Plymouth, Massachusetts.

=== Date unknown ===
- "A Dutch Ship, putting in this Year [of 1620, before June], sold 20 Negroes to the Colony [as slaves], which were the first of that Generation, that were ever brought to Virginia."
- A severe frost in England freezes the River Thames; 13 continuous days of snow blanket Scotland. On Eskdale Moor, only 35 of a flock of 20,000 sheep survive.
- History of submarines: Cornelis Drebbel demonstrates the first navigable undersea boat in the Thames in England.
- Juan Pablo Bonet, teacher of deaf children in the Spanish court, creates a sign alphabet.
- Francis Bacon publishes the Novum Organum (beyond Aristotle's Organon) on logical thinking.
- A Short Account of the Destruction of the Indies by Bartolomé de las Casas and Origin and progress of the disturbances in the Netherlands by Johannes Gysius are re-published in the Netherlands.
- Shōgun Tokugawa Hidetada begins restoring Osaka Castle in Japan. Its modern-day appearance dates from this remodeling.

=== Ongoing ===
- The Thirty Years' War (1618–1648) continues (principally on the territory of modern-day Germany).

== Births ==
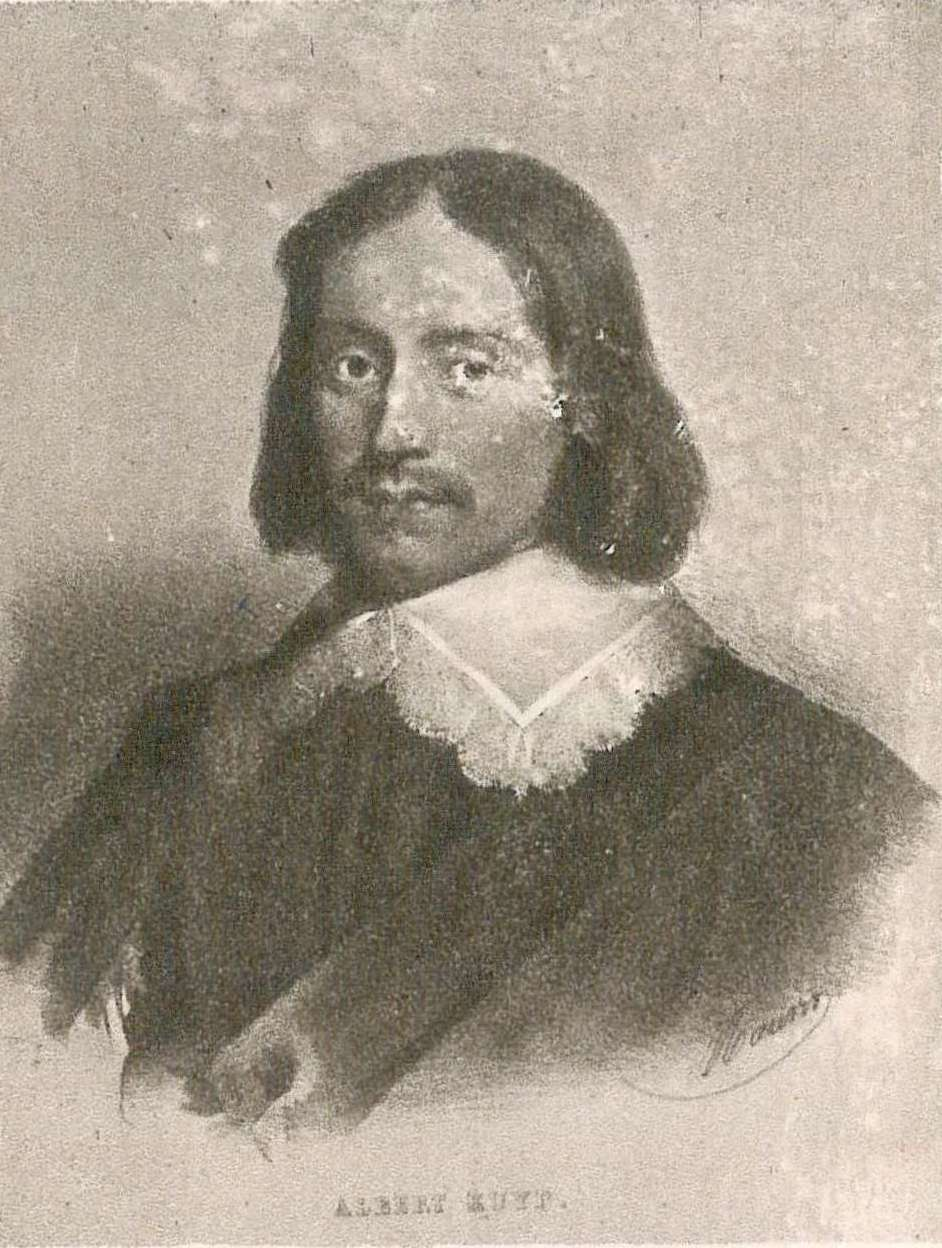
Aelbert Cuyp

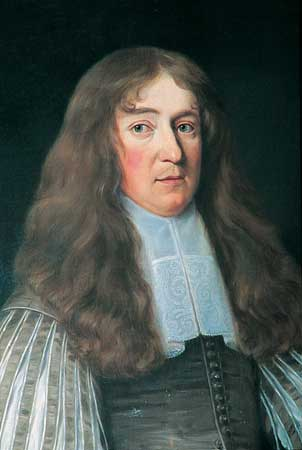
Winston Churchill

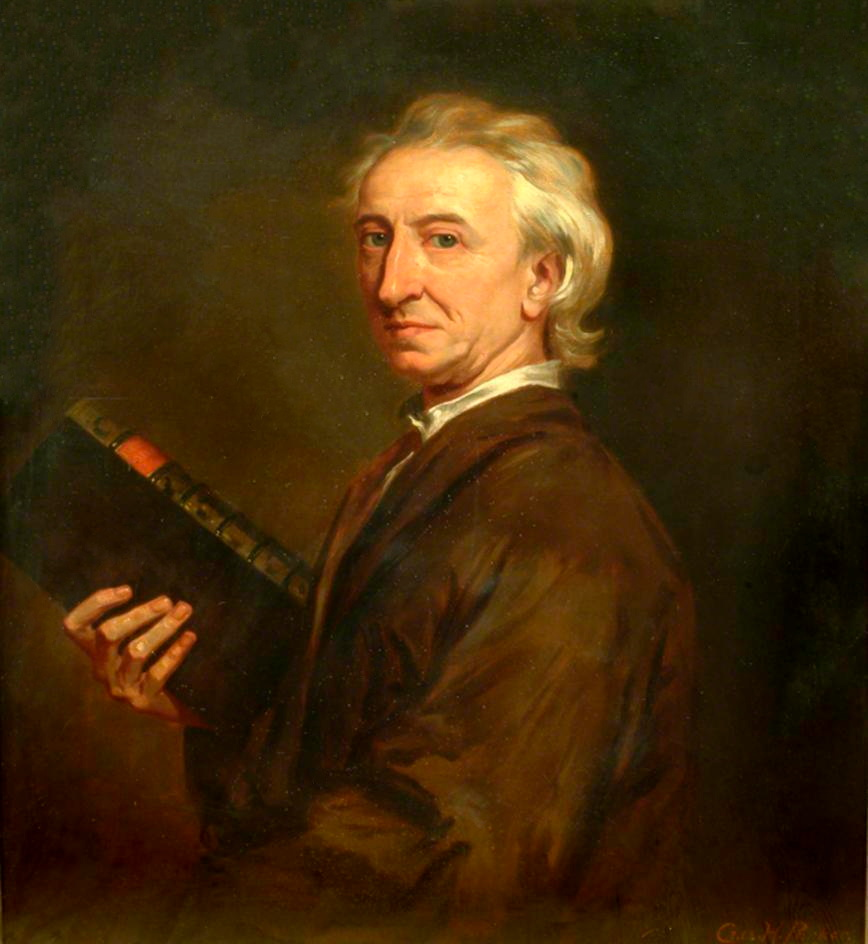
John Evelyn

=== January–March ===
- January 1
  - William Brouncker, 2nd Viscount Brouncker of England (d. 1684)
  - Robert Morison, Scottish botanist and taxonomist (d. 1683)
- January 5 – Miklós Zrínyi, Croatian military commander (d. 1664)
- January 9 – Anton Günther I, Count of Schwarzburg-Sondershausen (d. 1666)
- January 17 – Anton Janson, Dutch type founder and printer (d. 1687)
- January 31 – Prince Georg Friedrich of Waldeck, Dutch general and German field marshal (d. 1692)
- February 1 – Gustaf Bonde, Swedish politician (d. 1667)
- February 3 – Sir James Clavering, 1st Baronet, English landowner (d. 1702)
- February 5 – Paul Barbette, Dutch physician (d. 1666)
- February 13 – Girolamo Casanata, Italian cardinal (d. 1700)
- February 15 – François Charpentier, French archaeologist and man of letters (d. 1702)
- February 16 – Frederick William, Elector of Brandenburg (d. 1688)
- February 23 – Francis Newport, 1st Earl of Bradford, English politician (d. 1708)
- March 10 – Johann Heinrich Hottinger, Swiss philologist and theologian (d. 1667)
- March 13 – Alexander Seton, 1st Viscount of Kingston (d. 1691)
- March 29 – Edward Digges, English barrister and colonist, Colonial Governor of Virginia (d. 1674)

=== April–June ===
- April 4 – Bernardino León de la Rocha, Roman Catholic prelate, Bishop of Coria and of Tui (1669–1673) (d. 1675)
- April 15 – Edward Villiers, English politician and military officer (d. 1689)
- April 17 – Marguerite Bourgeoys, French Catholic nun, founder of the Congregation of Notre Dame (d. 1700)
- April 18 – Winston Churchill (Cavalier), English noble, soldier (d. 1688)
- April 21 – Salvatore Castiglione, Italian painter (d. 1676)
- April 24 – John Graunt, English demographer (d. 1674)
- May 3 – Bogusław Radziwiłł, Polish-Lithuanian noble (d. 1669)
- May 21 – Krsto Zmajević, Montenegrin-born Venetian merchant (d. 1688)
- May 23 – Pieter Neefs the Younger, Flemish painter (d. 1675)
- May 25 – Warwick Mohun, 2nd Baron Mohun of Okehampton, English Member of Parliament (d. 1665)
- June 6 – Sir John Covert, 1st Baronet, English politician (d. 1679)
- June 11 – John Moore (Lord Mayor), Member of Parliament for the City of London (d. 1702)

=== July–September ===
- July 20
  - Nikolaes Heinsius the Elder, Dutch scholar (d. 1681)
  - Camillo Massimo, Italian cardinal, patron of the arts (d. 1677)
- July 21 – Jean Picard, French astronomer and priest (d. 1682)
- July 31 – Juan Ignacio de la Carrera Yturgoyen, Chilean politician (d. 1682)
- August 6 – William Hiseland, English (later British) soldier, reputed supercentenarian (d. 1732)
- August 19 – Johann Just Winckelmann, German writer and historian (d. 1699)
- August 22 – Alexander Rigby (died 1694), English politician (d. 1694)
- August 24 – Thomas Stucley (MP), English politician (d. 1663)
- August 26 – Ernst Bogislaw von Croÿ, German Lutheran administrator (d. 1684)
- September 4 – Ernest Gottlieb, Prince of Anhalt-Plötzkau (d. 1654)
- September 6 – Isabella Leonarda, Italian composer (d. 1704)
- September 18 – Albert II, Margrave of Brandenburg-Ansbach, German prince (d. 1667)
- September 25 – François Bernier, French physician and traveller (d. 1688)
- September 29 – John Louis of Elderen, Bishop of Liege (d. 1694)

=== October–December ===
- October 1 – Nicolaes Pieterszoon Berchem, Dutch Golden Age painter of pastoral landscapes (d. 1683)
- October 4 – François-Henri Salomon de Virelade, French lawyer (d. 1670)
- October 15 – William Borlase (died 1665), English politician (d. 1665)
- October 16 – Pierre Paul Puget, French painter (d. 1694)
- October 20 – Aelbert Cuyp, Dutch painter (d. 1691)
- October 27 – Philip Louis, Duke of Schleswig-Holstein-Sonderburg-Wiesenburg (d. 1689)
- October 31 – John Evelyn, English diarist and writer (d. 1706)
- November 10
  - Ninon de l'Enclos, French author (d. 1705)
  - Theodoor Boeyermans, Flemish Baroque painter (d. 1678)
- c. November 20 – Peregrine White, first child born to English settlers at Plymouth Colony (d. 1704)
- December 17
  - Henri Charles de La Trémoille, son of Henry de La Trémoille (d. 1672)
  - Maurice of the Palatinate, 4th son of Elector Frederick V of the Palatinate (d. 1652)
- December 18 – Heinrich Roth, German Jesuit missionary, pioneering Sanskrit scholar (d. 1668)
- December 23 – Johann Jakob Wepfer, Swiss pathologist (d. 1695)
- probable – Ecaterina Cercheza, princess consort of Moldavia (d. 1666)

== Deaths ==
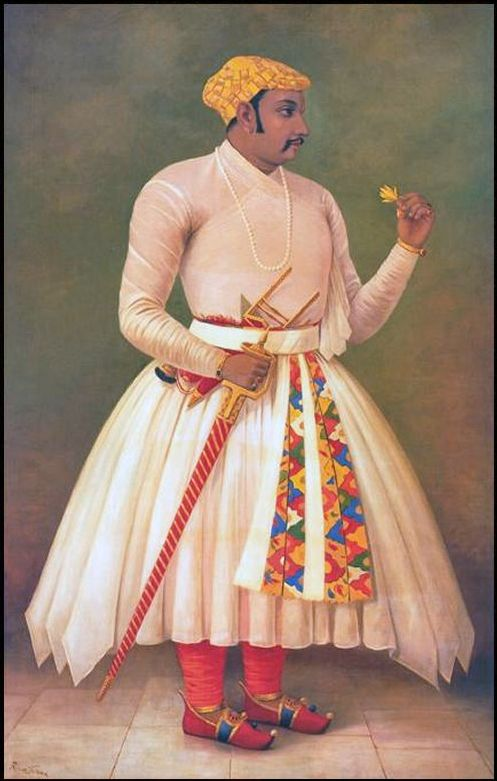
Amar Singh I

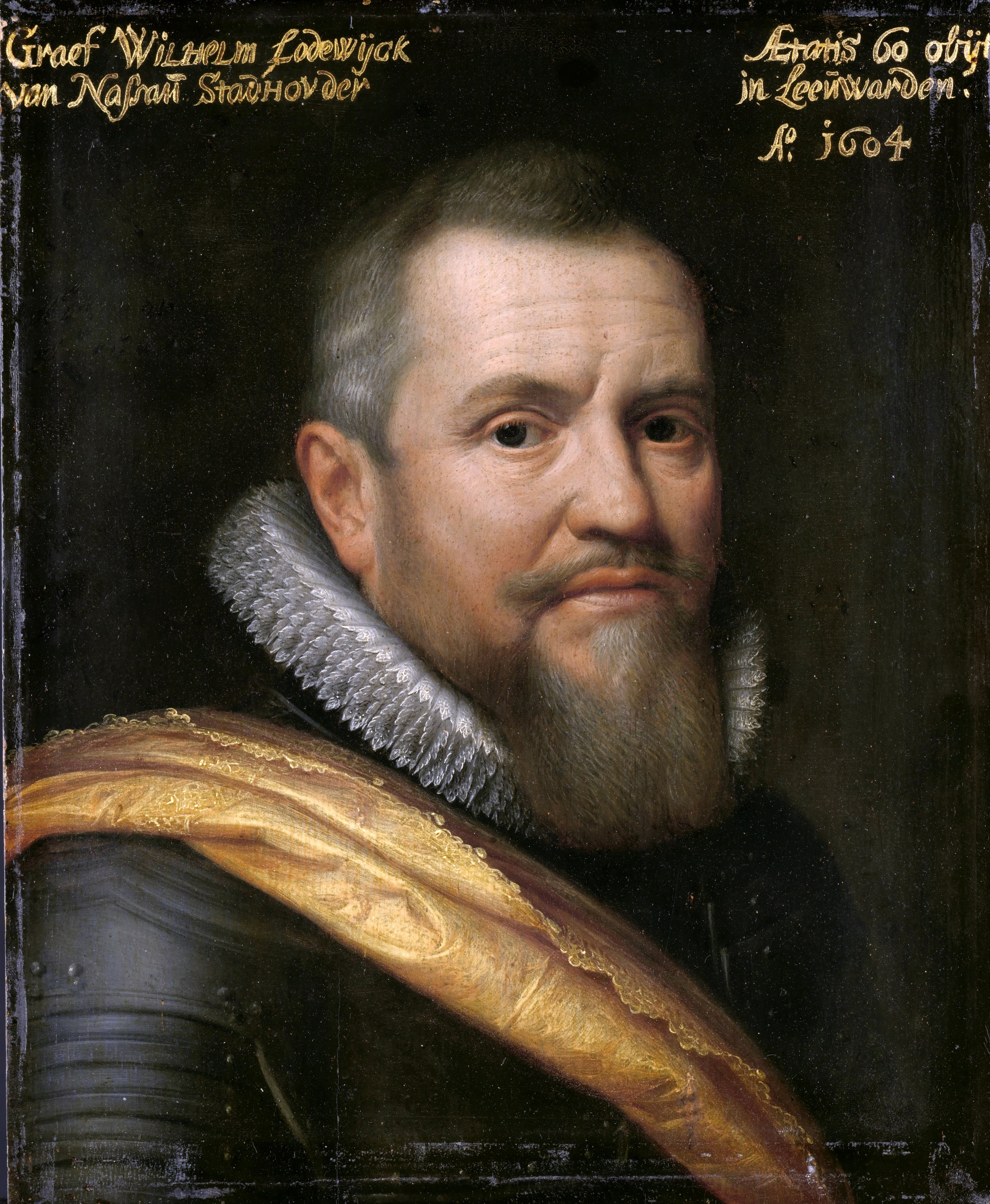
William Louis, Count of Nassau-Dillenburg

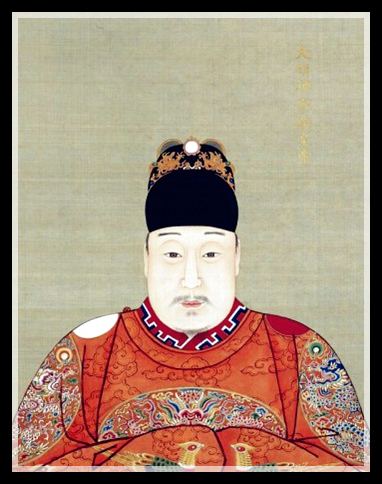
Wanli Emperor

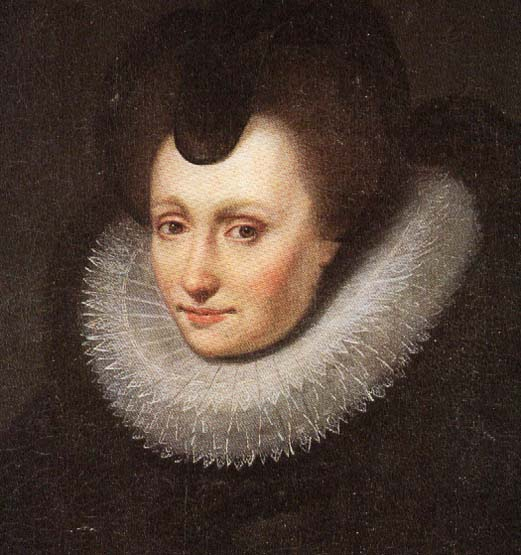
Louise de Coligny

=== January–March ===
- January 20 – John Croke, English politician and judge (b. 1553)
- January 26 – Amar Singh I, ruler of Mewar (b. 1559)
- January 28 – Archduchess Eleanor of Austria (b. 1582)
- February 15 – James Archer, Irish Jesuit; played a controversial role in the Nine Years' War (b. 1550)
- February 19
  - Al-Mansur al-Qasim, Imam of Yemen (b. 1559)
  - Roemer Visscher, Dutch writer (b. 1547)
- February 23 – Nicholas Fuller, English politician (b. 1543)
- March 1 – Thomas Campion, English poet and composer (b. 1567)
- March 5 – Giovanni Francesco Sagredo, Italian mathematician (b. 1571)
- March 17 – St. John Sarkander, Moravian priest (injuries caused by torturing) (b. 1576)
- March 25 – Johannes Nucius, German composer (b. c. 1556)
- March 29 – Hachisuka Yoshishige, Japanese daimyō of the Edo period (b. 1586)

=== April–June ===
- April 8 – Angelo Rocca, Italian humanist (b. 1545)
- April 23 – Hayyim ben Joseph Vital, Palestinian-born Kabbalist (b. 1543)
- April 14 – Rascas de Bagarris, French scholar (b. 1562)
- May 16 – William Adams, English navigator and samurai (b. 1564)
- May 30 – Mathias Hovius, Roman Catholic archbishop (b. 1542)
- June 17 – Mikołaj Zebrzydowski (b. 1553)

=== July–September ===
- July 13 – William Louis, Count of Nassau-Dillenburg (b. 1560)
- August 2 – Carolus Luython, Belgian composer (b. 1557)
- August 14 – Katherine Hastings, Countess of Huntingdon, wife of Henry Hastings, 3rd Earl of Huntingdon (b. 1540)
- August 18 – Wanli Emperor, of China (b. 1563)
- September 13 – Wolfgang Hirschbach, German legal scholar (b. 1570)
- September 26 – Taichang Emperor, fourteenth emperor of the Ming dynasty of China (b. 1582)
- September – Sidonia von Borcke, German noble and alleged witch (b. 1548)

=== October–December ===
- October 7 – Stanisław Żółkiewski, Polish nobleman of the Lubicz coat of arms (b. 1547)
- November 6 – Philip III, Margrave of Baden-Rodemachern (1588–1620) (b. 1567)
  - William Butten, Mayflower passenger (b. unknown)
- November 7 – Robert Hesketh, English politician (b. 1560)
- November 9 – Louise de Coligny, daughter of Gaspard II de Coligny; fourth and last spouse of William the Silent (b. 1555)
- November 11 – Isaac and Josias Habrecht, Swiss watchmaking brothers (b. 1544)
- November 27 – Francis, Duke of Pomerania-Stettin, Bishop of Cammin (b. 1577)
- December 3 – Janusz Radziwiłł, Polish noble (b. 1579)
- December 21 – George Fleetwood, English politician (b. 1564)

=== Date unknown ===
- Rose of Turaida, legendary Latvian murder victim (b. 1601)
- John Flower, English politician (b. 1535)

=== Approximate date ===
- Brianda Pereira, Azorean Portuguese heroine (b. 1550)
- Isabella Parasole, Italian engraver (b. ca. 1570)
