= 1721 =

1721 in various calendars
- Gregorian calendar: 1721; MDCCXXI
- Ab urbe condita: 2474
- Armenian calendar: 1170; ԹՎ ՌՃՀ
- Assyrian calendar: 6471
- Balinese saka calendar: 1642–1643
- Bengali calendar: 1127–1128
- Berber calendar: 2671
- British Regnal year: 7 Geo. 1 – 8 Geo. 1
- Buddhist calendar: 2265
- Burmese calendar: 1083
- Byzantine calendar: 7229–7230
- Chinese calendar: 庚子年 (Metal Rat); 4418 or 4211 — to — 辛丑年 (Metal Ox); 4419 or 4212
- Coptic calendar: 1437–1438
- Discordian calendar: 2887
- Ethiopian calendar: 1713–1714
- Hebrew calendar: 5481–5482
- Hindu calendars
- Vikram Samvat: 1777–1778
- Shaka Samvat: 1642–1643
- Kali Yuga: 4821–4822
- Holocene calendar: 11721
- Igbo calendar: 721–722
- Iranian calendar: 1099–1100
- Islamic calendar: 1133–1134
- Japanese calendar: Kyōhō 6 (享保６年)
- Javanese calendar: 1645–1646
- Julian calendar: Gregorian minus 11 days
- Korean calendar: 4054
- Minguo calendar: 191 before ROC 民前191年
- Nanakshahi calendar: 253
- Thai solar calendar: 2263–2264
- Tibetan calendar: ལྕགས་ཕོ་བྱི་བ་ལོ་ (male Iron-Rat); 1847 or 1466 or 694 — to — ལྕགས་མོ་གླང་ལོ་ (female Iron-Ox); 1848 or 1467 or 695

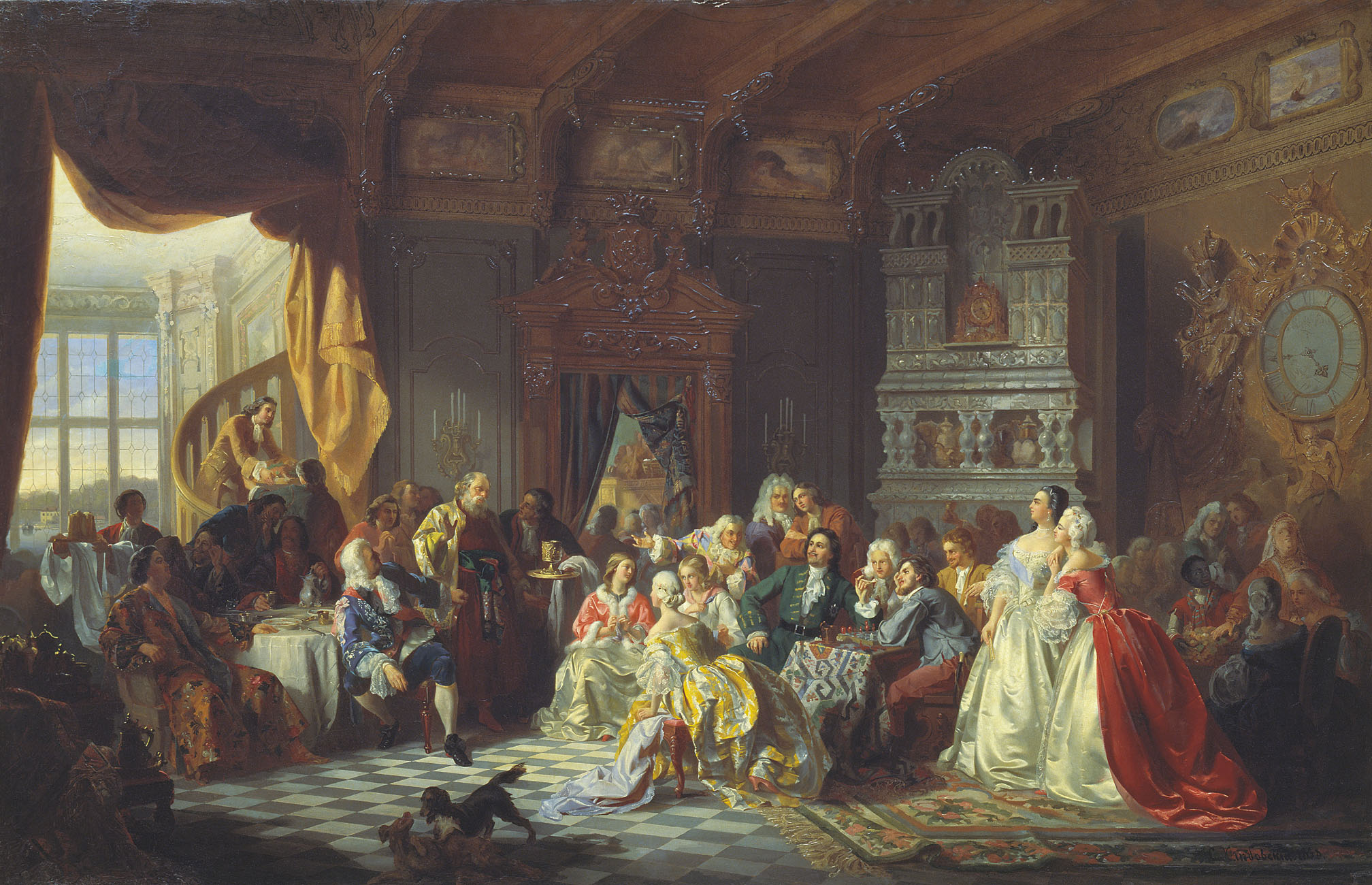
November 2: The Russian Empire is created as the Tsar Peter the Great is proclaimed "Tsar of all the Russias". (1858 painting by Stanisław Chlebowski)

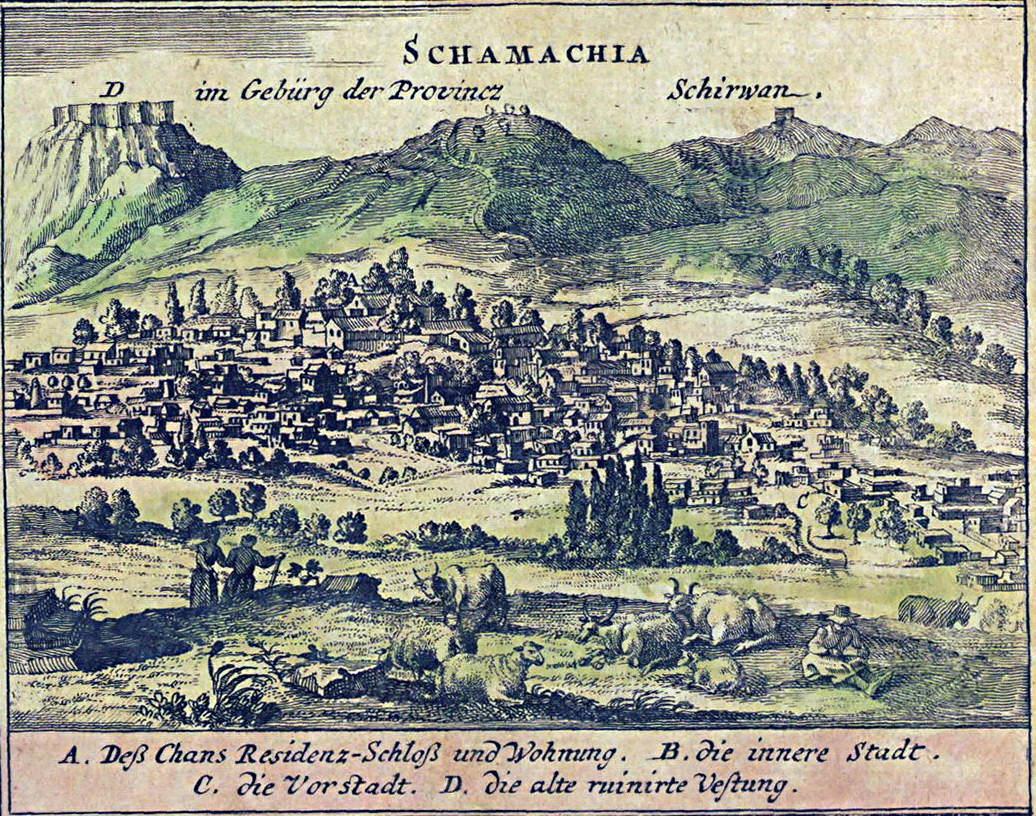
August 18: The siege of Shamakhi ends in Persia.

1721 (MDCCXXI) was a common year starting on Wednesday of the Gregorian calendar and a common year starting on Sunday of the Julian calendar, the 1721st year of the Common Era (CE) and Anno Domini (AD) designations, the 721st year of the 2nd millennium, the 21st year of the 18th century, and the 2nd year of the 1720s decade. As of the start of 1721, the Gregorian calendar was 11 days ahead of the Julian calendar, which remained in localized use until 1923.

== Events ==
=== January–March ===
- January 6 – The Committee of Inquiry on the collapse of the South Sea Company in Great Britain publishes its findings.
- February 5 – James Stanhope, chief minister of Great Britain, dies a day after collapsing while vigorously defending his government's conduct over the "South Sea Bubble" in Parliament.
- March 24 – Johann Sebastian Bach's Brandenburg concertos are completed, and dedicated to Christian Ludwig of Brandenburg-Schwedt.

=== April–June ===
- April 4 – Robert Walpole becomes the first Prime Minister of Great Britain (although this is more a term of disparagement at this time).
- April 21 – The deadliest outbreak of smallpox in the history of Boston begins when the British ship HMS Sea Horse arrives in Boston Harbor with a crew of sailors who had survived a smallpox epidemic. One of the Seahorse crew who had cleared quarantine develops symptoms the next day and infects other people in a lodging house. Over the next 10 months, 5,759 cases of smallpox are recorded in Boston and 844 people die of the disease.
- April 26 – Pirates John Taylor and Olivier Levasseur capture the 700-ton Portuguese galleon Nossa Senhora do Cabo at Réunion. The total value of treasure on board (from Goa) is estimated as between £100,000 and £875,000, one of the largest pirate hauls ever.
- May 8 – Pope Innocent XIII succeeds Pope Clement XI, as the 244th pope.
- June 26 – Dr. Zabdiel Boylston of the Harvard University School of Medicine begins the first public inoculation campaign in order to slow the smallpox epidemic in Boston, giving a vaccine to his own son, and then to his slave and the slave's infant son.

=== July –September ===
- July 31 – The Spanish expedition led by Coahuila Governor José de Azlor y Virto de Vera, sent to recapture Texas from the French, encounters Neches River the smaller French force of Louis Juchereau de St. Denis, who had led the French expansion westward from the Louisiana territory. Realizing that his forces are badly outnumbered, St. Denis abandons hope of colonizing the east Texas territory and Azlor retakes the area.
- August 18 – The Sack of Shamakhi occurs, in the Persian Safavid Empire.
- September 10 (August 23 Old Style) – The Treaty of Nystad is signed, ending the Great Northern War.

=== October –December ===
- October 22 – The Kelantan Sultanate is established at Kelantan Darul Naim (modern-day Kelantan Darul Naim, Malaysia).
- November 2 (October 22 Old Style) – The Romanov and architect of the Great Northern War Peter I, is proclaimed the first Emperor of All the Russias. This replaces the 174-year-long Tsardom of Russia with the Russian Empire, which will collapse almost 200 years later in 1917.
- December 22 – Philip V of Spain signs a Royal Decree in Lerma, transforming the Seminary of Saint Rose of Lima in Caracas into the Universidad Real y Pontificia de Caracas.

=== Date unknown ===
- José de Azlor y Virto de Vera, Marquis of San Miguel de Aguayo and governor of Spanish Texas, establishes the fort of Presidio La Bahía at its original location, on the ruins of the failed French Fort Saint Louis.
- Regular mail service between London and New England is established.
- A suggestion box is developed under the eighth shōgun of Japan, Yoshimune Tokugawa.

== Births ==
- January 10 – Johann Philipp Baratier, German scholar (d. 1740)
- January 11 – Anna Magdalena Godiche, Danish book printer and publisher (d. 1781)
- January 17 – Countess Palatine Elisabeth Auguste of Sulzbach, politically active Electress of Bavaria (d. 1794)
- February 3 – Friedrich Wilhelm von Seydlitz, Prussian general (d. 1773)
- February 8 – Catharina Elisabet Grubb, Finnish industrialist (d. 1788)
- February 21 – John McKinly, American physician, President of Delaware (d. 1796)
- March 8 – Elizabeth Pierrepont, Duchess of Kingston-upon-Hull, English noble (d. 1788)
- March 9 – Countess Palatine Caroline of Zweibrücken (d. 1774)
- March 19 – Tobias Smollett, Scottish physician and author (d. 1771)
- April 11 – David Zeisberger, Moravian missionary (d. 1808)
- April 14 – John Hanson, President of the Continental Congress of America (d. 1783)
- April 15 – Prince William Augustus, Duke of Cumberland, English military leader (d. 1765)

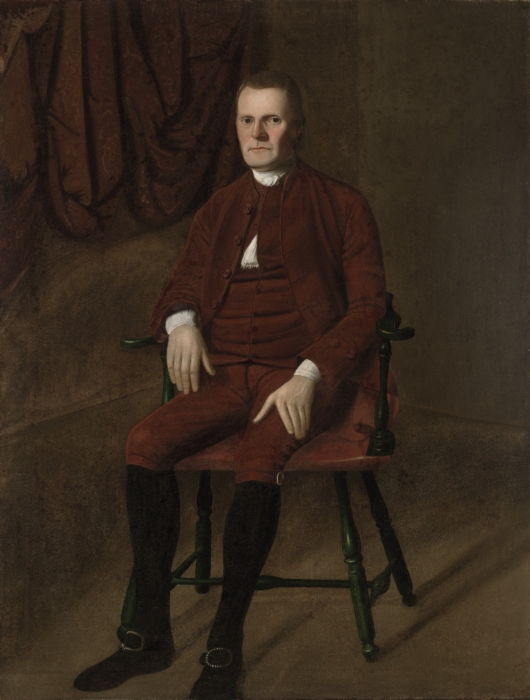
Roger Sherman

- April 19 – Roger Sherman, signer of the United States Declaration of Independence (d. 1793)
- June 19 – Johann de Kalb, Bavarian-French military officer who served as a major general in the Continental Army during the American Revolutionary War (d. 1780)
- July 9 – Johann Nikolaus Götz, German poet (d. 1781)
- July 14 – John Douglas, Scottish Anglican bishop and man of letters (d. 1807)
- August 4 – Granville Leveson-Gower, 1st Marquess of Stafford, English politician (d. 1803)
- August 31 – George Hervey, 2nd Earl of Bristol, British statesman (d. 1775)
- September 10 – Peyton Randolph, 1st and 3rd President of the Continental Congress (d. 1775)
- September 14 – Eliphalet Dyer, American statesman and judge (d. 1807)
- October 19 – Joseph de Guignes, French orientalist (d. 1800)
- November 9 – Mark Akenside, English poet and physician (d. 1770)
- November 22 – Joseph Frederick Wallet DesBarres, Swiss-born cartographer and Canadian statesman (d. 1824)
- December 6
  - James Elphinston, Scottish philologist (d. 1809)
  - Guillaume-Chrétien de Lamoignon de Malesherbes, French statesman (d. 1794)
- December 27 – François Hemsterhuis, Dutch philosopher (d. 1790)
- December 29 – Madame de Pompadour, mistress of King Louis XV of France (d. 1764)
- Date unknown – Im Yunjidang, Korean scholar, writer and neo-Confucian philosopher (d. 1793)

== Deaths ==
- January 25 – Robert Challe, French colonialist (b. 1659)
- January 26 – Pierre Daniel Huet, French churchman and scholar (b. 1630)
- February 5 – Abraham Hill, British merchant (b. 1633)
- February 5 –James Stanhope, 1st Earl Stanhope, English chief minister (b. 1673)
- February 16 – James Craggs the Younger, English politician (b. 1686)
- February 24 – John Sheffield, 1st Duke of Buckingham and Normanby, English statesman and poet (b. 1648)
- March 16 – James Craggs the Elder, English politician (b. 1657)
- March 19 – Pope Clement XI (b. 1649)
- March 29 – Charles Vane, English pirate, executed (b. 1680)
- April – Mary Read, English-born pirate
- April 14 – Michel Chamillart, French statesman (b. 1652)
- April 27 – Eva von Buttlar, German mystic sectarian (b. 1670)
- May 7 – Zinat-un-Nissa, princess of the Mughal Empire (b. 1643)
- May 8 – Marc-René de Voyer de Paulmy d'Argenson (1652–1721), French politician (b. 1652)
- May 10 – Christian William I, Prince of Schwarzburg-Sondershausen (1666–1720) (b. 1647)
- June 3 – Joaquín Canaves, Spanish Catholic bishop (b. 1640)
- June 18 – Philip, Landgrave of Hesse-Philippsthal, son of William VI (b. 1655)
- July 8 – Elihu Yale, American benefactor of Yale University (b. 1649)
- July 18 – Jean-Antoine Watteau, French painter (b. 1684)
- July 19 – Sir Jonathan Trelawny, 3rd Baronet, British bishop (b. 1650)
- July 26 – Godefroy Maurice de La Tour d'Auvergne, Duke of Bouillon, French noble (b. 1636)
- August 3 – Grinling Gibbons, Dutch-born woodcarver (b. 1648)
- August 13 – Jacques Lelong, French bibliographer (b. 1665)
- September 3 – Sir William Glynne, 2nd Baronet, English politician (b. 1663)
- September 6 – Georg Wolfgang Wedel, German physician, surgeon, botanist, chemist and philosopher (b. 1645)
- September 8
  - Michael Brokoff, Czech sculptor (b. 1686)
  - Henri Arnaud, French Waldensian pastor, leader (b. 1641)
- September 9 – David Martin, French theologian (b. 1639)
- September 11 – Rudolf Jakob Camerarius, German botanist and physician (b. 1665)

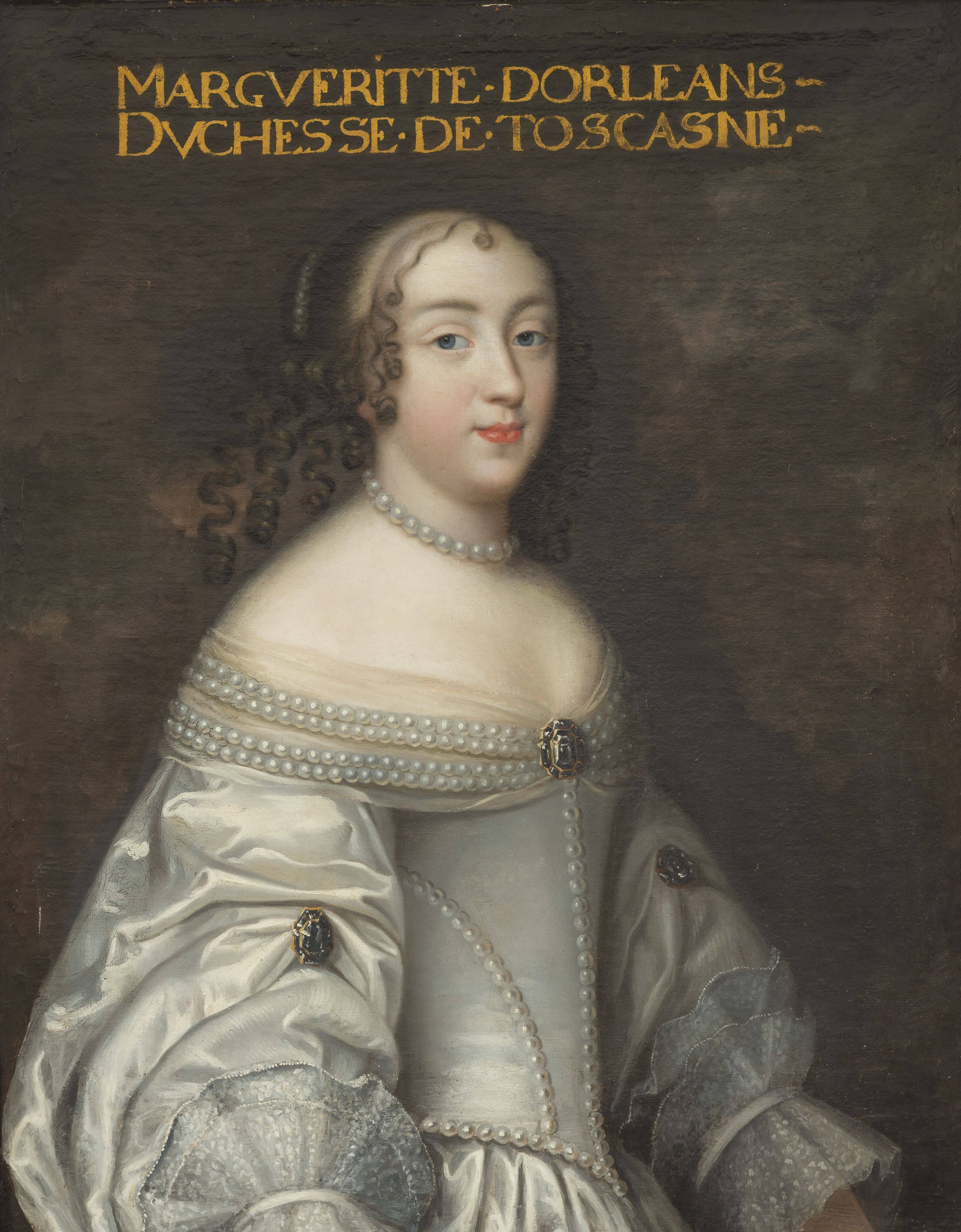
Marguerite Louise d'Orléans

- September 17 – Marguerite Louise d'Orléans, French princess (b. 1645)
- September 18 – Matthew Prior, British poet and diplomat (b. 1664)
- September 20 – Thomas Doggett, Irish actor (b. c. 1670)
- September 24 – Pacificus of San Severino, Italian saint (b. 1653)
- October 4 – Abraham Alewijn, Dutch playwright (b. 1664)
- October 11
  - Edward Colston, English merchant, philanthropist (b. 1636)
  - Anton Florian, Prince of Liechtenstein (b. 1656)
- October 23 – Samuel Frisching, Bernese soldier and politician (b. 1638)
- October 24 – Anthony Morris (I), American politician (b. 1654)
- December 13 – Alexander Selkirk, Scottish-born sailor (original "Robinson Crusoe"), of yellow fever (b. 1676)

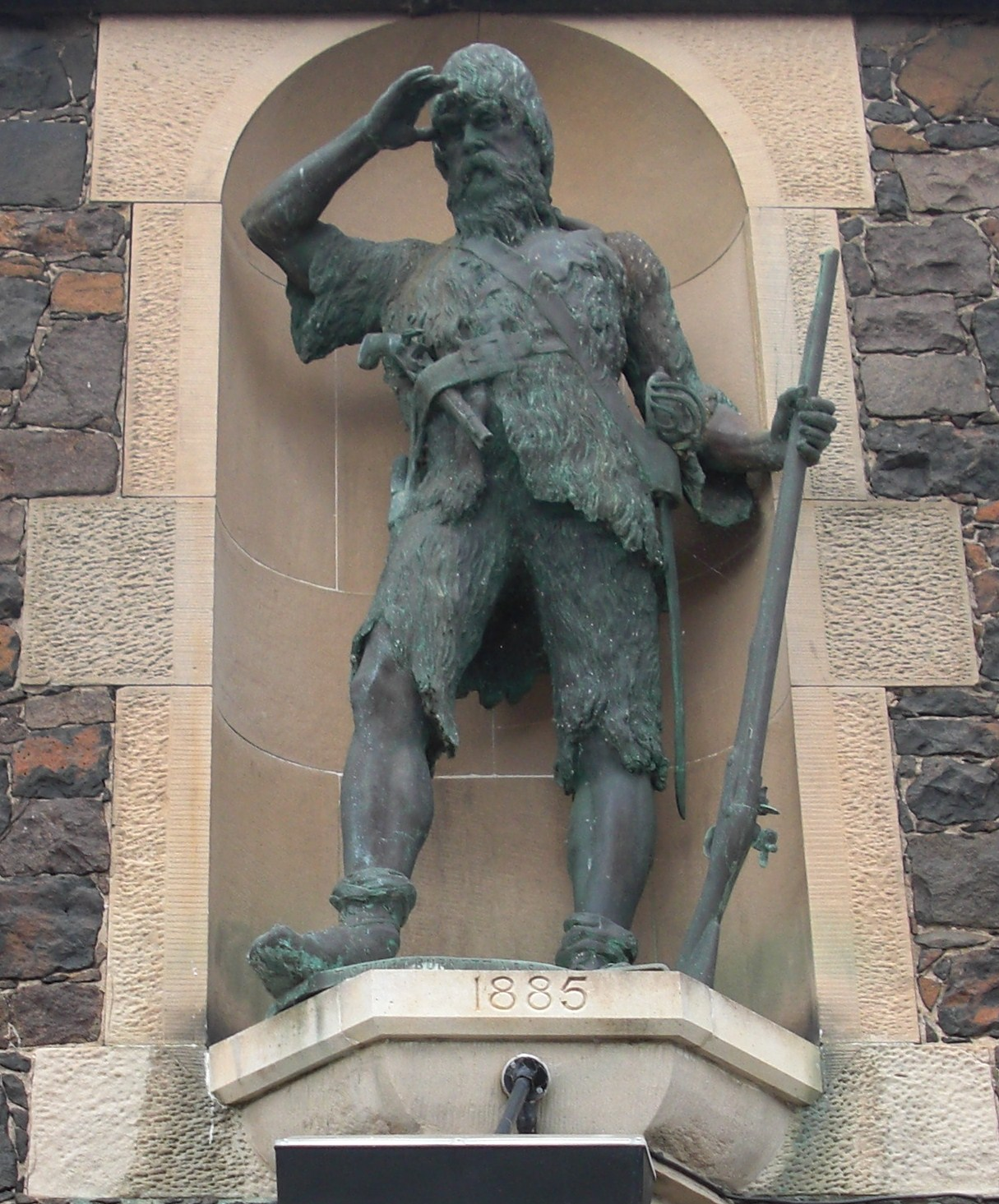
Alexander Selkirk

- December 17 – Richard Lumley, 1st Earl of Scarbrough, English statesman (b. 1650)
- December 25 – António Luís de Sousa, 2nd Marquis of Minas, Portuguese general, governor-general of Brazil (b. 1644)
- date unknown – Sultan Abdullah Khan Abdali, Persian Governor, Shah of Herat (b. 1670)
