= Raphael Levy =

French Jew accused of ritual murder and burned

Raphael Levy (born 1612 in Flévy/Chelaincourt; died 17 January 1670) was a Jewish inhabitant of the city of Metz who was burned at the stake, accused of having ritually murdered a Christian child, Didier Le Moyne. For some years after his execution, the Jewish community in Metz marked the anniversary of his death (25 Tevet) as a day of fasting.

On 25 September 1669 (the eve of Rosh Hashanah) three-year-old Didier Le Moyne went missing in the woods outside the village of Glatigny, about ten miles east of Metz. Levy had been seen riding towards Metz the same day, and was accused of having abducted the child, although he had an alibi for the time of the disappearance.

Charges were brought against Levy in the Parlement of Metz on 3 October. Even before the trial a child's body was found in the woods, partially eaten by animals, but it was too disfigured to be identified as that of the missing child. Levy refused to confess to the crime despite torture, but was nevertheless convicted and sentenced to death by the Parlement. Offered an opportunity to become a Christian, he declared that he had lived a Jew and would die a Jew.

His defense attorney Meyer Schwabe, one of the elders of the Metz congregation, was himself tarred with fabricated accusations of mocking Jesus on Good Friday. Although the allegations against Schwabe and Levy became increasingly bizarre and contradictory, both were sentenced to death. The royal director of Metz was able to save Schwabe through his intervention and also prevent a pogrom against the Jewish community, but any help came too late for Levy. He was publicly burned at the stake in Metz on January 17, 1670.

The Parlement applied to Louis XIV to have the 95 Jewish families in Metz expelled from the province, but the king prohibited any further action in the matter. Louis XIV himself generally forbade any further blood libel trials and even forbade the mere belief in a corresponding allegation.

The Jewish community in France declared Glatigny to be cursed and instructed all Jews not to set foot there. In 2014, the town erected a plaque to Levy, referring to him as a martyr and explaining that he had been accused of a crime which he did not commit. Members of the Jewish community of Moselle, and Joel Mergui, president of the Consistoire, the French Jewish community's organization responsible for religious services, attended the service.

== See also ==
- Blood libel
