= Michael Ettmüller =

German physician (1644-1683)

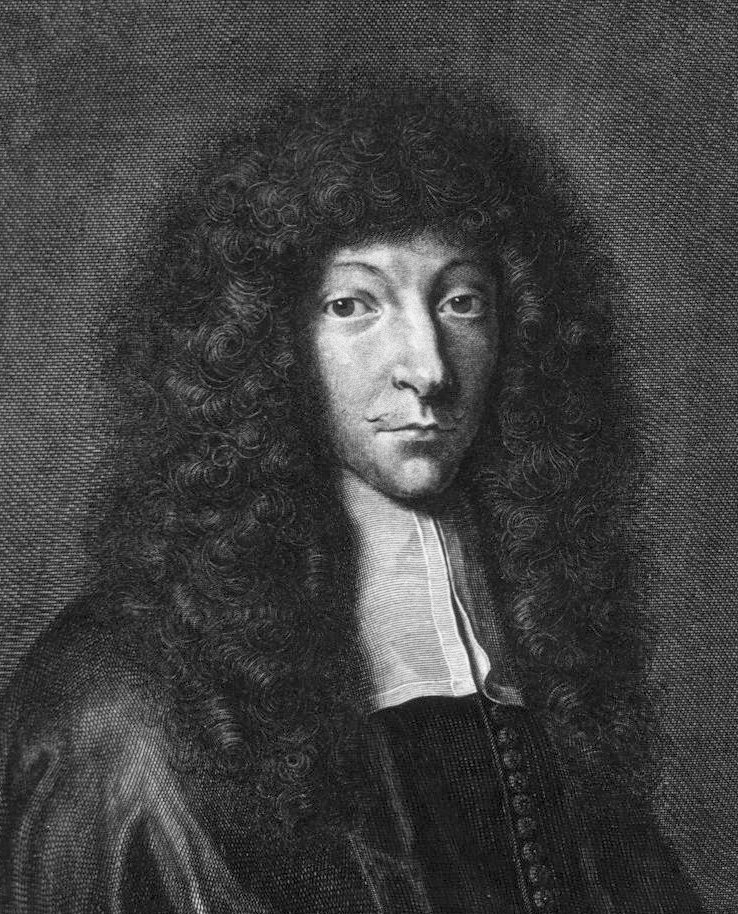
Michael Ettmüller

Michael Ettmüller (26 May 1644 – 9 March 1683) was a German physician, born at Leipzig.

He studied at his birthplace and at Wittenberg, and after travelling in Italy, France and England was recalled in 1668 to Leipzig, where he was admitted a member of the faculty of medicine in 1676. About the same time the university gave him the chair of botany, and appointed him extraordinary professor of surgery and anatomy. He died on 9 March 1683 at Leipzig.

He enjoyed a great reputation as a lecturer, and wrote many tracts on medical and chemical subjects. His collected works were published in 1708 by his son, Michael Ernst Ettmüller (1673–1732), who was successively professor of medicine (1702), anatomy and surgery (1706), physiology (1719) and pathology (1724) at Leipzig.

== Works ==
- Michaelis Ettmülleri Chimia rationalis ac experimentalis curiosa : secundum Principia Recentiorum adornata, variisque ac propriis Experimentis tam chimicis quam practicis, ut et Medicamentis nobilioribus referta; Comite semper Ratione, nunquam adhuc publicam Lucem visa, jam vero in Ordinem redacta, ac Boni publici causa edita . Lugduni Batavorum 1684 Digital edition by the University and State Library Düsseldorf
- Michaelis Ettmulleri Opera medica theoretico-practica : opus in IV Tomos distributum . Bd. 1 - 4 . De Tournes, Genevae 1736 Digital edition by the University and State Library Düsseldorf
