= Paul Barbette =

Dutch physician

Paul Barbette (5 February 1620 in Strasbourg – buried 10 March 1665 in Amsterdam) was a Dutch medical doctor.

After finishing his medicine studies at Leiden University in 1645, he practised both medicine and surgery in Amsterdam. He was a determined enemy of bleeding in all cases, relying chiefly on sudorifics. He proposed the operation of gastrostomy in cases of intussusception of the bowels, and introduced some improvements in surgical instruments. Barbette was the first to describe intussusception in 1674.

He wrote many works, which have been frequently reprinted, and he was held as a high authority in his day. His writings, however, contain little that is original, but they display much learning and acquaintance with his profession. They are in Dutch and Latin, and have been collected in Opera omnia medica et chirurgica (Amsterdam, 1672, 8 volumes), which was translated in Italian, German, French, and English.

On 26 June 1649 in Amsterdam, he married Susanne Claijsens Passhasius, with whom he baptized at least six children at the Walloon Church. When he died at the age of 45, he lived on the Kloveniersburgwal and was survived by two young children.
