= Veit Hans Schnorr von Carolsfeld =

German businessman

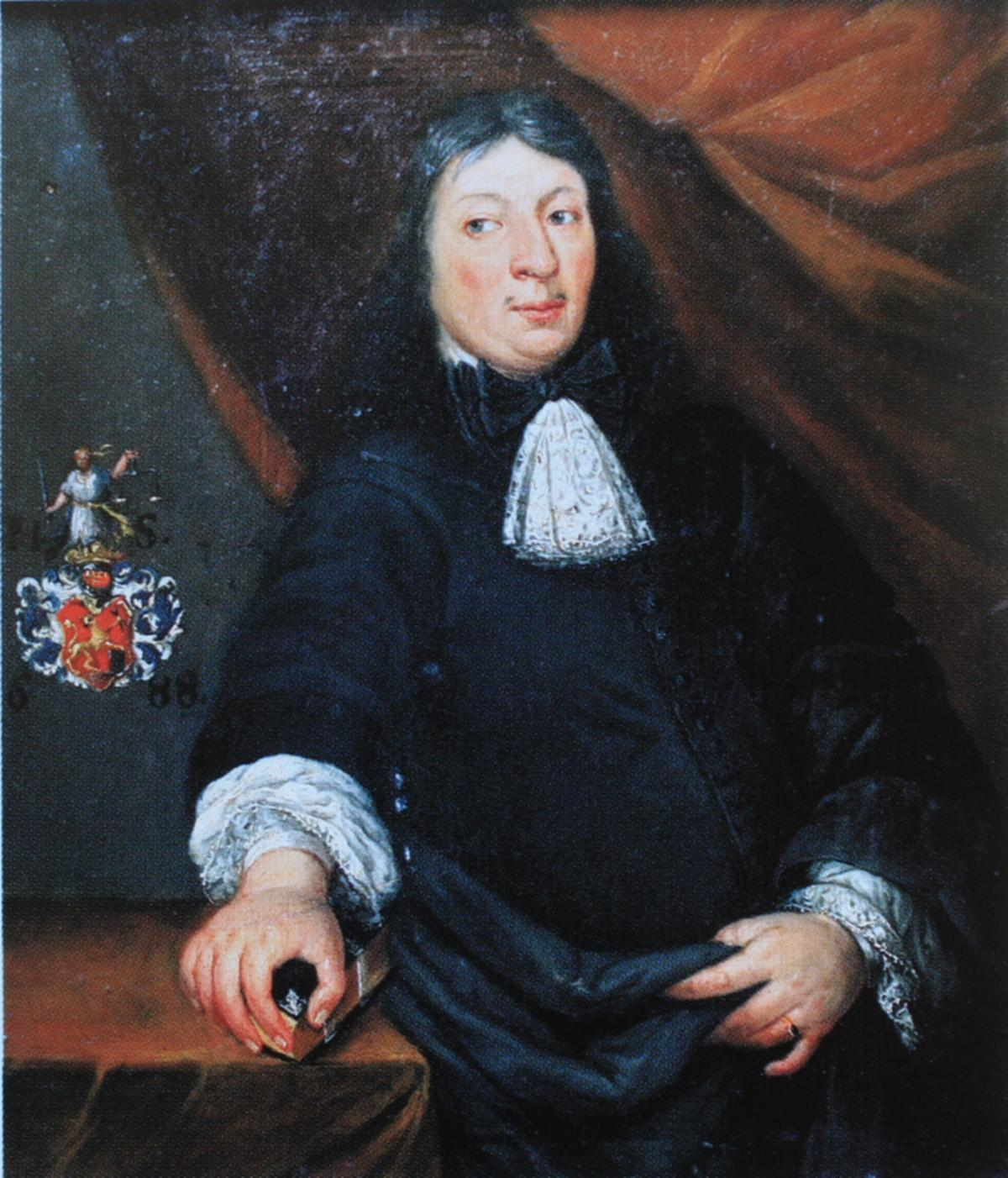
- Born: March 15, 1644
- Died: January 26, 1715 (aged 70)
- Other name: German
- Occupation: Mining magnate

Veit Hans Schnorr (15 March 1644 in Schneeberg, Saxony - 26 January 1715 in Schneeberg) was a German iron and cobalt magnate. He lived in what was then the Electorate of Saxony in the Holy Roman Empire.
