= Juan Caballero y Ocio =

Mexican priest

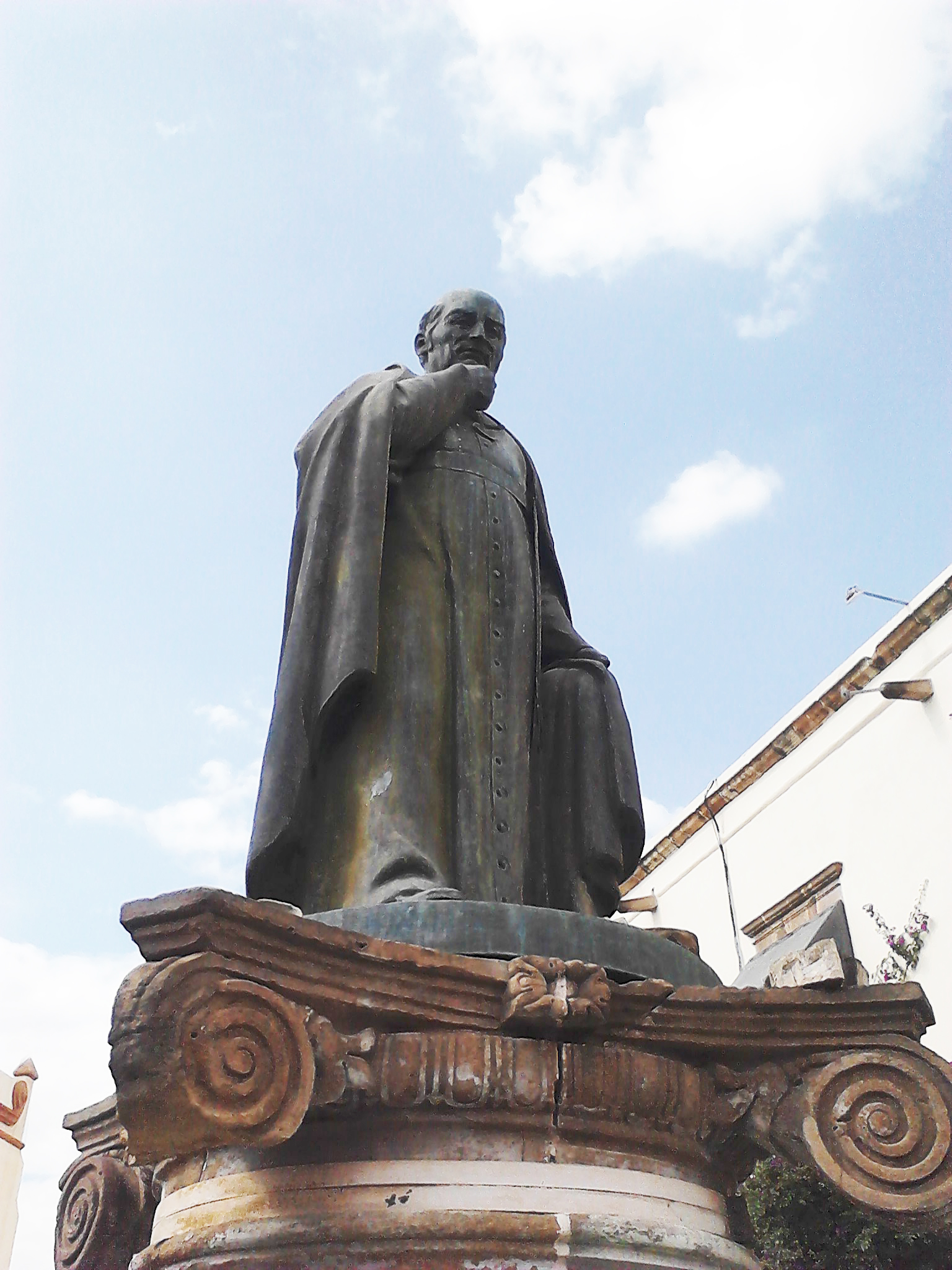
Statue of Juan Caballero y Ocio erected in his hometown

Juan Caballero y Ocio (May 4, 1644 - April 11, 1707) was a priest remarkable for lavish gifts to the Catholic church and for charity.

== Life ==
Caballero was born and died in Querétaro City, Mexico. While still a layman he was mayor of his native city. After taking Holy Orders he held several high offices; he also refused two bishoprics, and an offer from the King of Spain to make him Governor of California after his large donation to the missions there.

A wealthy man, Caballero was known for his substantial donations to the Catholic Church, as well as for other charitable gifts, such as paying the dowries of over two hundred girls. He left his fortune to the church, which held the money in trust until La Reforma.

== Sponsored works ==
Caballero sponsored the construction of many Catholic buildings during his life. In his native city of Querétaro, these included:

- the Parroquia de Santiago, a Jesuit church
- the San Ignacio de Loyola Jesuit College
- expansions to the Church of San Francisco
- the Church of Santo Domingo
- the Convent of Santo Domingo
- the Chapel of Our Lady of Loretto
- the Royal Convent of Santa Clara, a Capuchine convent
- a hospital in the Franciscan convent
- the Temple and Convent of San Antonio de Padua
- the Templo de Nuestra Señora del Carmen
- the Santuario de La Congregación de Nuestra Señora de Guadalupe
- the temporary predecessor to Santa Rosa de Viterbo

Elsewhere, he contributed to:

- the churches of Sts. Clara, Belen, and Philip Neri in Mexico City
- the church of St. Dominic in Guadalajara
- the Spanish missions in California
