= Treaty of Copenhagen (1670) =

The Treaty of Copenhagen or Treaty of 1670 was a treaty of commerce and alliance signed on 11 July 1670, between King Christian V of Denmark and of Norway and King Charles II of England and of Scots. It was written in Latin. It was expanded the next day, 12 July 1670, with the Third Article concerning contraband amended and clarified by a declaration in French signed at Copenhagen on 4 July 1780. The terms of the treaty were later reaffirmed by the Treaty of Kiel, following the defeat of Denmark-Norway during the Napoleonic Wars.

Among the treaty's principal effects was the security it provided for the resumption of the Danish colony on Saint Thomas in the Virgin Islands, which had previously been dispersed following repeated assaults by English privateers.

== See also ==
- Treaty of Kiel (1814)
