= Johannes Hancke =

Johannes Hancke (also Jan Hancke; Joannes Hancke; 2 February 1644 – 24 August 1713) was a German Jesuit theology professor and mathematician.

John Hancke was born in Neisse, and joined the Jesuit order in 1664. After his novitiate in Brno, he studied theology from 1670 to 1674 at the universities of Breslau and Prague and he published his Theses Mathematicae in 1676. He taught Mathematics and Theology in Prague and at the Palacký University of Olomouc and the University of Breslau. He died, aged 69, in Brno.

== Works ==
- Positiones ex universa theologie scholastice. 1672
- Genesis montium propositionibus physico-mathematici illustrata. 1680
- Tenebrae summatim illustratae sive doctrina eclipsium … Christophorus Küchler, Mainz 1682
- Praedictio astronomica solaris deliquii ad annum 1684. 1683
- Horologium nocturnum magneticum. 1683
- with Kaspar Neumann: Exercitatio catoptrica de idolo speculi. Baumann, Breslau 1685
- Litera de cogitata et Romae agitata reformatione calendarii Gregoriani. 1702

== External links and references ==
- www.phil.muni.cz
- navarikp.sweb.cz
