= Glatigny, Moselle =

Glatigny
- Commune
- Coat of arms
- Location of Glatigny
- Location within France Location within Grand Est
- Coordinates: 49°08′49″N 6°20′06″E
- Country: France
- Region: Grand Est
- Department: Moselle
- Arrondissement: Metz
- Canton: Le Pays Messin
- Intercommunality: Haut Chemin - Pays de Pange

Government
  - Mayor (2020–2026): Victor Stallone
- Area^{1}: 6.23 km^{2} (2.41 sq mi)
- Elevation: 200 m (660 ft)
- Highest elevation: 298 m (978 ft)
- Lowest elevation: 215 m (705 ft)
- Population (2023): 256
  - Density: 41.1/km^{2} (106/sq mi)
- Time zone: UTC+01:00 (CET)
  - Summer (DST): UTC+02:00 (CEST)
- INSEE/Postal code: 57249 /57530
- ^{1} French Land Register data, which excludes lakes, ponds, glaciers > 1 km^{2} (0.386 sq mi or 247 acres) and river estuaries.

Glatigny (French pronunciation: [ɡlatiɲi]; German: Glatingen from 1915-1918 and 1940-1944) is a commune in the Moselle department in Grand Est in north-eastern France.

== See also ==
- Communes of the Moselle department
