= François-Henri Salomon de Virelade =

French lawyer

François-Henri Salomon de Virelade (4 October 1620, Bordeaux – 2 March 1670, Bordeaux) was a French lawyer, and advocate general of the Grand Conseil. On the basis of his publication Discours d'Etat à M. Grotius, he was elected the third occupant of Académie française seat 29 in 1644, having received more votes than the dramatist Pierre Corneille. Jean Le Rond d'Alembert said of the appointment that "it had prostituted the name of academician".

== Selected works ==
- Discours d'Etat à M. Grotius. 1640.
