= Eva von Buttlar =

Eva Margaretha von Buttlar (22 June 1670, Barchfeld, Hesse-Kassel - 27 April 1721) was a mystic-libertine sectarian and the eponym for a group known as Buttlarsche Rotte (Buttlarian gang).

== Biography ==
Eva von Buttlar was born in the German town of Eisenach. She left her husband, the count tutor Jean de Vèsias. Together with Justus Gottfried Winter, a theology student and Johann Georg Appenfeller, a medical student, she founded a philadelphical society in Allendorf called the "Christliche und Philadelpische Sozietät" (Christian and Philadelphical Society). This society grew to about seventy members and proclaimed the dawn of the millennial empire. After the pietistscommand (assembly ban for separatist societies) of Karl von Hessen-Kassel, they moved from Allendorf to Glashütte and, later to Saßmannshausen near Lassphe in the shire of Wittgenstein.

The Society was rejected by different Pietists like Spener and Francke and other separatist Societies. In November 1704, the Society was arrested for fornication, blasphemy, abortion and double infant murder. They escaped in March 1705 from Castle Wittgenstein.

On 3 November 1705, Winter announced Eva as the fiancé of the holy spirit and Appenfeller to be God's son. In 1706, the activities of the society peaked in Lüdge near Pyrmont. Again driven by court order, they moved to Altona, where the society caused no further issues. Butllar then married Appenfeller. In 1713, she gave birth to her only child, a son designated as the Messiah. After her death in April 1721, the Society continued, but their history was lost.

== Beliefs and viewpoints ==
Buttlar rejected ecclesiasticism and any religious restriction made by Philadelphian groups and the contempt of worship and sacrament made by separatist groups.

Everything else the society practiced can be summarized as sectarian-sexual libertinism, particularly the society's idiosyncratic interpretation of the Sophia-Speculation and the myth of androgynous primeval man. With Winter as the "Godfather" and Appenfeller as the "Son", she, the "heavenly Sophia", allegorized the visible "heavenly trinity".

the "practical application" of the mystical idea of the marriage of spiritual man with heavenly Sophia, as developed by Jakob Böhme and Johann Georg Gichtel involved the physical union with "Mother Eve" at the "Pool of Bethesda", which restored the androgynous "creation condition".

The "carnal intercourse as something sacred" (Winter considered), bound the members of the society in the practice of their faith.
