= 1714 =

1714 in various calendars
- Gregorian calendar: 1714; MDCCXIV
- Ab urbe condita: 2467
- Armenian calendar: 1163; ԹՎ ՌՃԿԳ
- Assyrian calendar: 6464
- Balinese saka calendar: 1635–1636
- Bengali calendar: 1120–1121
- Berber calendar: 2664
- British Regnal year: 12 Ann. 1 – 1 Geo. 1
- Buddhist calendar: 2258
- Burmese calendar: 1076
- Byzantine calendar: 7222–7223
- Chinese calendar: 癸巳年 (Water Snake); 4411 or 4204 — to — 甲午年 (Wood Horse); 4412 or 4205
- Coptic calendar: 1430–1431
- Discordian calendar: 2880
- Ethiopian calendar: 1706–1707
- Hebrew calendar: 5474–5475
- Hindu calendars
- Vikram Samvat: 1770–1771
- Shaka Samvat: 1635–1636
- Kali Yuga: 4814–4815
- Holocene calendar: 11714
- Igbo calendar: 714–715
- Iranian calendar: 1092–1093
- Islamic calendar: 1125–1126
- Japanese calendar: Shōtoku 4 (正徳４年)
- Javanese calendar: 1637–1638
- Julian calendar: Gregorian minus 11 days
- Korean calendar: 4047
- Minguo calendar: 198 before ROC 民前198年
- Nanakshahi calendar: 246
- Thai solar calendar: 2256–2257
- Tibetan calendar: ཆུ་མོ་སྦྲུལ་ལོ་ (female Water-Snake); 1840 or 1459 or 687 — to — ཤིང་ཕོ་རྟ་ལོ་ (male Wood-Horse); 1841 or 1460 or 688

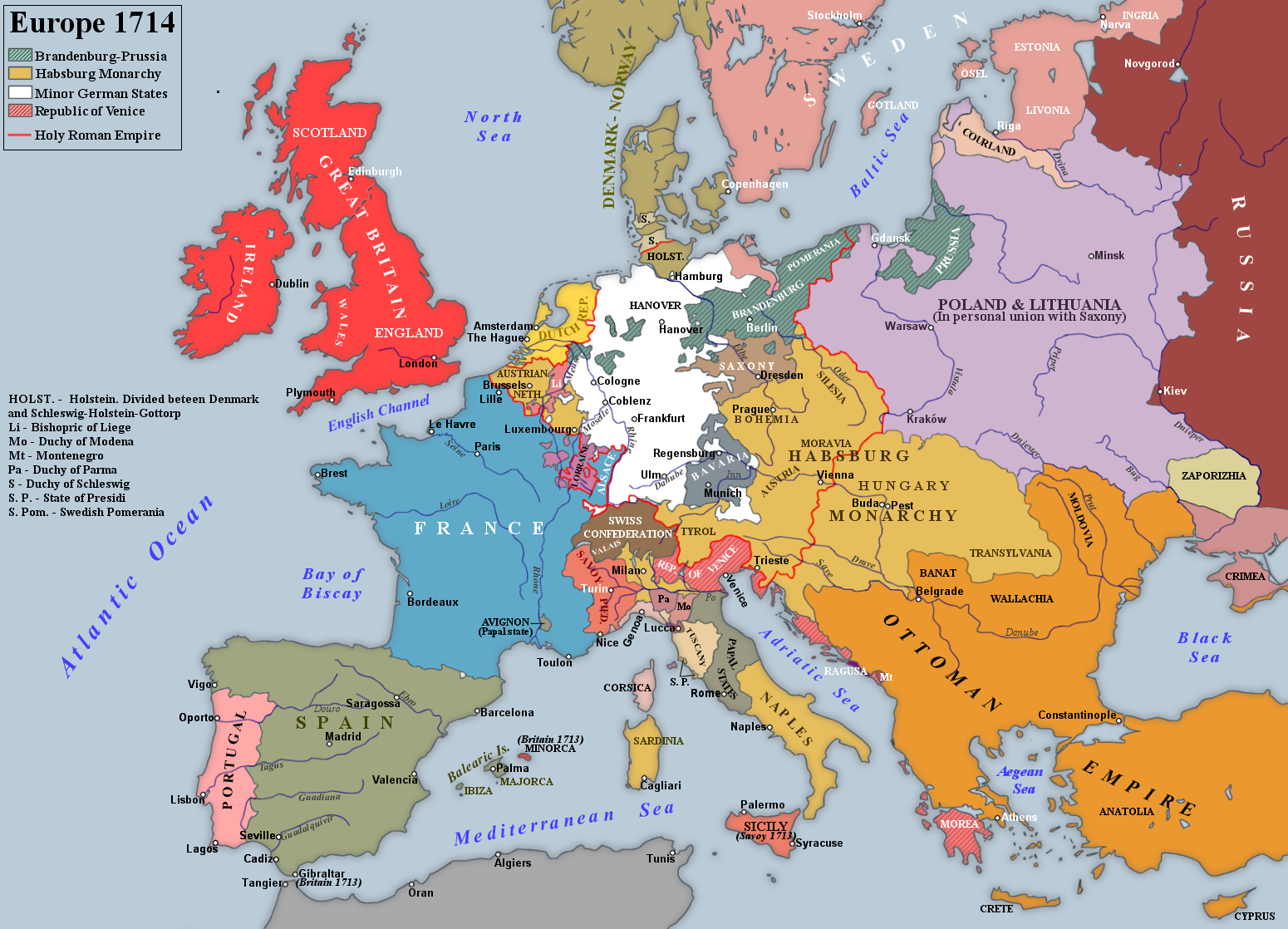
March 7: Treaty of Rastatt signed with Spain and France losing territory to enlarged Austrian Empire

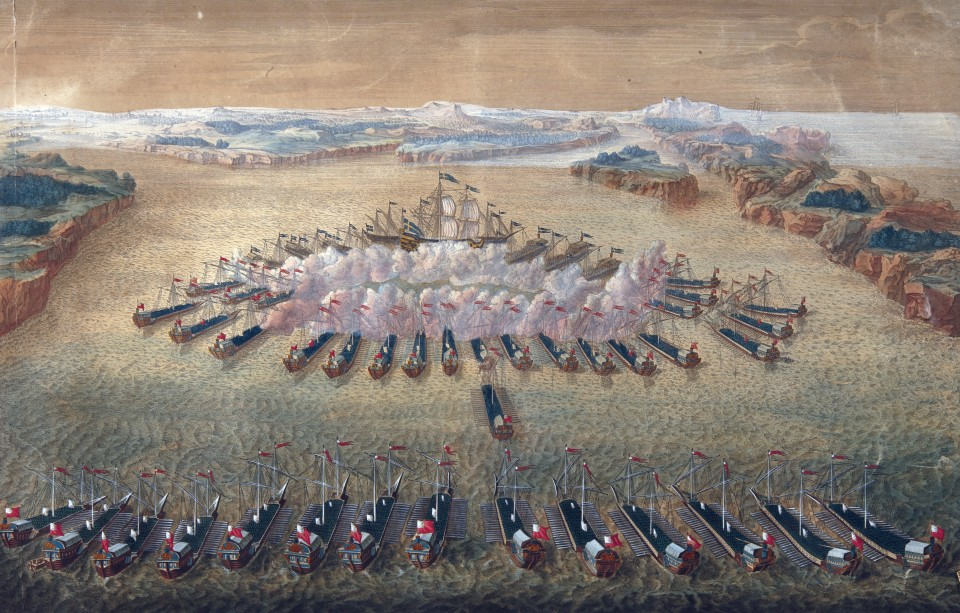
July 27: Battle of Gangut.

1714 (MDCCXIV) was a common year starting on Monday of the Gregorian calendar and a common year starting on Friday of the Julian calendar, the 1714th year of the Common Era (CE) and Anno Domini (AD) designations, the 714th year of the 2nd millennium, the 14th year of the 18th century, and the 5th year of the 1710s decade. As of the start of 1714, the Gregorian calendar was 11 days ahead of the Julian calendar, which remained in localized use until 1923.

== Events ==
=== January–March ===
- January 21 – After being tricked into deserting a battle against India's Mughal Empire by the rebel Sayyid brothers, Prince Azz-ud-din Mirza is blinded on orders of the Emperor Farrukhsiyar as punishment.
- February 7 – The Siege of Tönning (a fortress of the Swedish Empire and now located in Germany in the state of Schleswig-Holstein) ends after almost a year, as Danish forces force the surrender of the remaining 1,600 defenders. The fortress is then leveled by the Danes.
- February 28 – (February 17 old style) Russia's Tsar Peter the Great issues a decree requiring compulsory education in mathematics for children of government officials and nobility, applying to children between the ages of 10 and 15 years old.
- March 2 – (February 19 old style) The Battle of Storkyro is fought between troops of the Swedish Empire and the Russian Empire, near what is now the village of Napue in Finland. The outnumbered Swedish forces, under the command of General Carl Gustaf Armfeldt, suffer 1,600 troops killed in action while the Russians led by General Mikhail Golitsyn lose 400 men.
- March 7 – The Treaty of Rastatt is signed between Austria and France, concluding the War of the Spanish Succession between them. Austria receives the Spanish territories in Italy (the Kingdom of Naples, Duchy of Milan and Kingdom of Sardinia), as well as the Southern Netherlands; and from France, Freiburg and Landau. The Austrian Habsburg Empire reaches its largest territorial extent yet, with Charles VI, Holy Roman Emperor succeeding Philip V of Spain, as ruler in the ceded territories.

=== April–June ===
- April 11 – France signs five separate treaties— with Great Britain, the Netherlands, Portugal, Prussia and Savoy— to end hostilities in the War of the Spanish Succession following the negotiations of the Peace of Utrecht.
- April 12 – Italian Jesuit missionary Niccolò Gianpriamo is dispatched from Portugal on an evangelical trip to Asia starting with the Portuguese Indian colony of Goa, where he arrives after five months.
- May 19 – Anne, Queen of Great Britain, refuses to allow members of the House of Hanover to settle in Britain during her lifetime.
- May 20 – Johann Sebastian Bach leads the first performance of his cantata for Pentecost, Erschallet, ihr Lieder, BWV 172, at the chapel of Schloss Weimar.
- June 3 – The city of Kassel in Germany inaugurates the summer tradition of the "water stairs" or "great cascades" (Grossen Kaskaden) emptying from the base of the Hercules monument down to the Wilhelmshöhe castle.
- June 20 – In France, Henri-Charles du Cambout de Coislin, the Roman Catholic Bishop of Metz, condemns the papal bull Unigenitus, issued by Pope Clement XI against the 1671 commentary by Pasquier Quesnel of the four Gospels and inflaming the Jansenist controversy.
- June 26 – Spain and the Netherlands sign a peace treaty to end hostilities between those two nations in the War of the Spanish Succession.

=== July–September ===
- July 8 – Longitude prize: The Parliament of Great Britain votes "to offer a reward for such person or persons as shall discover the Longitude" (£10,000 for any method capable of determining a ship's longitude within 1 degree; £15,000, within 40 minutes, and £20,000 within ½ a degree).
- July 27 – The Imperial Russian Navy gains its first important victory against the Swedish Navy in the Battle of Gangut.
- August 1 – Georg Ludwig von Braunschweig-Lüneburg, Elector of Hanover, becomes King George I of Great Britain and Ireland, on the death of Queen Anne. Anne's death brings an end to the reign of the House of Stuart, in that her half-brother James Francis Edward Stuart, the eldest son of James II of England, has been ineligible for the British throne based on the Act of Settlement 1701 had barred members of the Roman Catholic church from becoming monarchs. George of Hanover, as great-grandson of James I of England and a second cousin to Anne, is deemed the eldest living Protestant descendant of James I.
- September 11 – War of the Spanish Succession: Barcelona is taken after a year's siege, and Catalonia surrenders to Spanish and French Bourbon armies.
- September 18 – George I, the new King of Great Britain and Ireland, arrives in Britain for the first time in his life, after having departed Hannover and sailing from the Netherlands.
- September 29 – The Great Hatred: the Cossacks of the Tsardom of Russia kill about 800 people overnight on the Finnish island of Hailuoto.

=== October–December ===
- October 20 – The coronation of George I of Great Britain and Ireland takes place in Westminster Abbey, a little less than three months after George became the new British monarch.
- October 24 – Four Dutch investors, led by brothers Nicolaas and Hendrik van Hoorn, purchase the South American colony of Berbice from French mercenary Jacques Cassard, who had captured the colony from the Van Peere family. A century later, in 1815, the land is ceded to Great Britain and later merged with neighboring colonies to form what is now Guyana.
- November 30 – King Philip V of Spain issues a decree reorganizing the Spanish government to create four ministries, with the Secretary of State being the chief minister, predecessor to the office of Prime Minister of Spain. José de Grimaldo becomes the first person to have the chief ministry.
- December 9 – Ottoman–Venetian War (1714–1718): The Ottoman Empire declares war on the Republic of Venice.

=== Date unknown ===
- Archbishop Tenison's School, the world's earliest surviving mixed gender school, is established by Thomas Tenison, Archbishop of Canterbury, in Croydon, south of London, England.
- Louis Juchereau de St. Denis establishes Fort St. Jean Baptiste, at the site of present day Natchitoches, Louisiana (the first permanent European settlement in the Louisiana Territory, after Biloxi (1699) and Mobile, Alabama (1702) were separated).
- Worcester College, University of Oxford is founded (formerly Gloucester College, closed during the Dissolution of the monasteries).
- Stockholm County is founded.
- The river Kander (Switzerland) is redirected into Lake Thun.

== Births ==
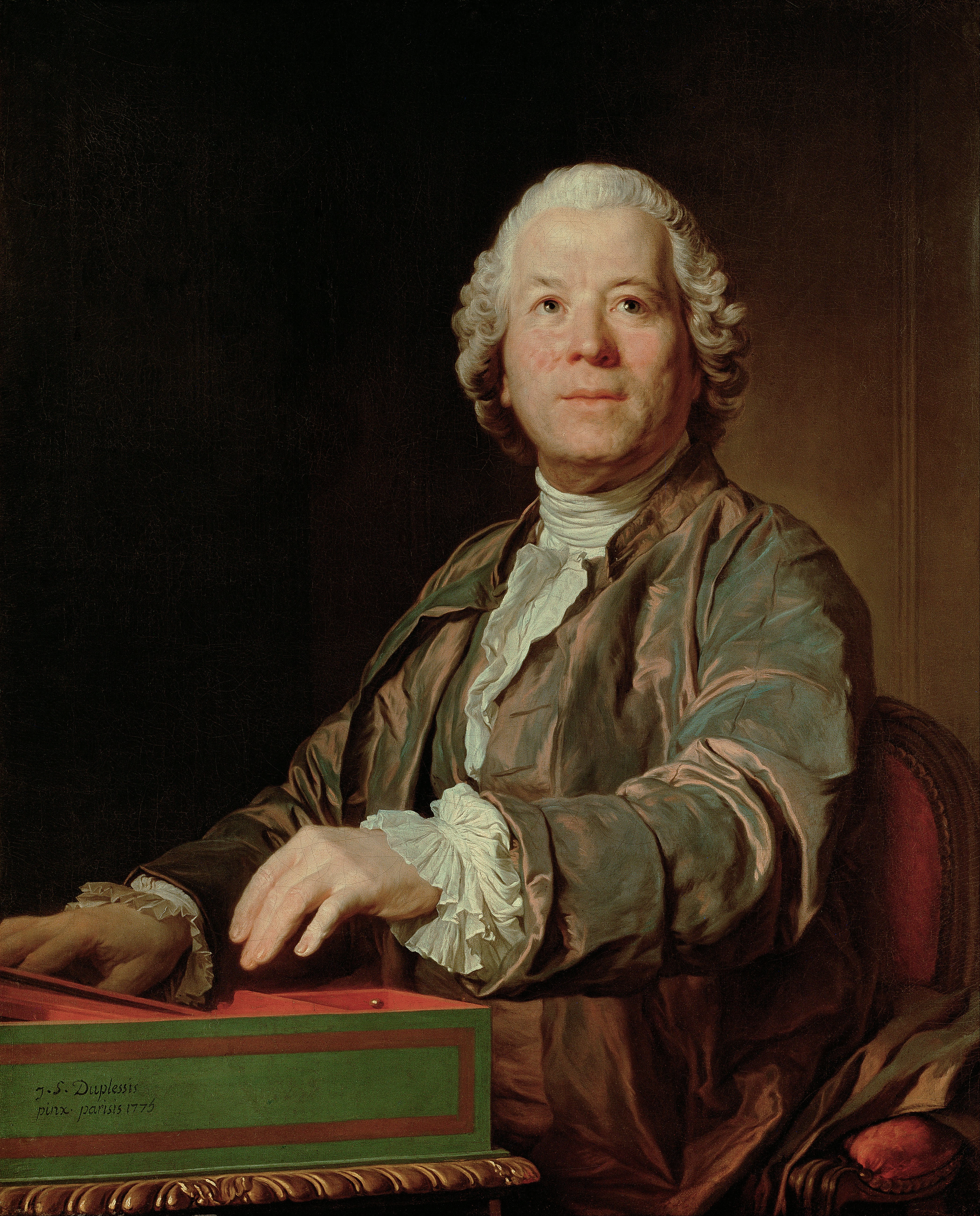
Christoph Willibald Gluck

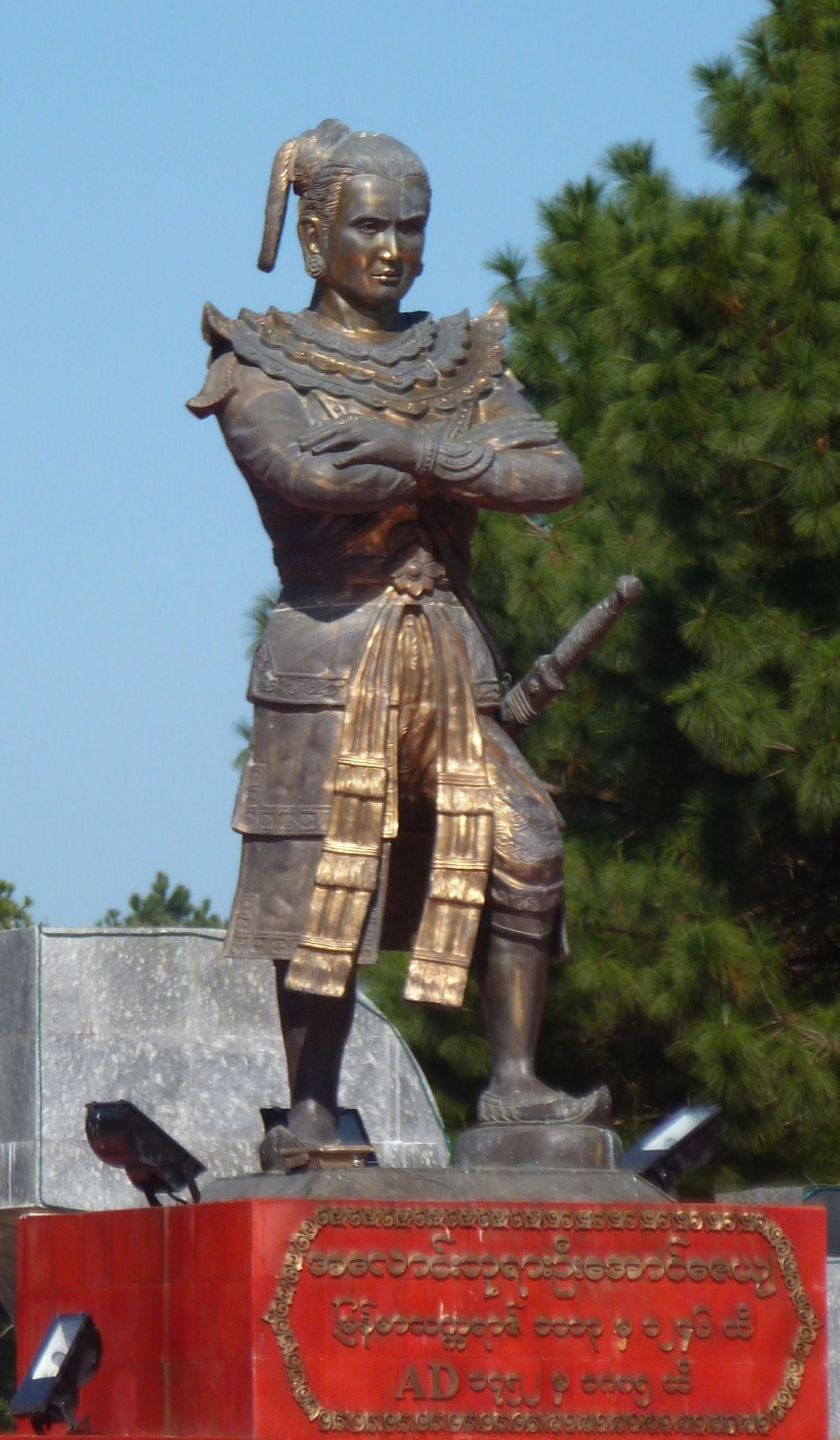
Alaungpaya

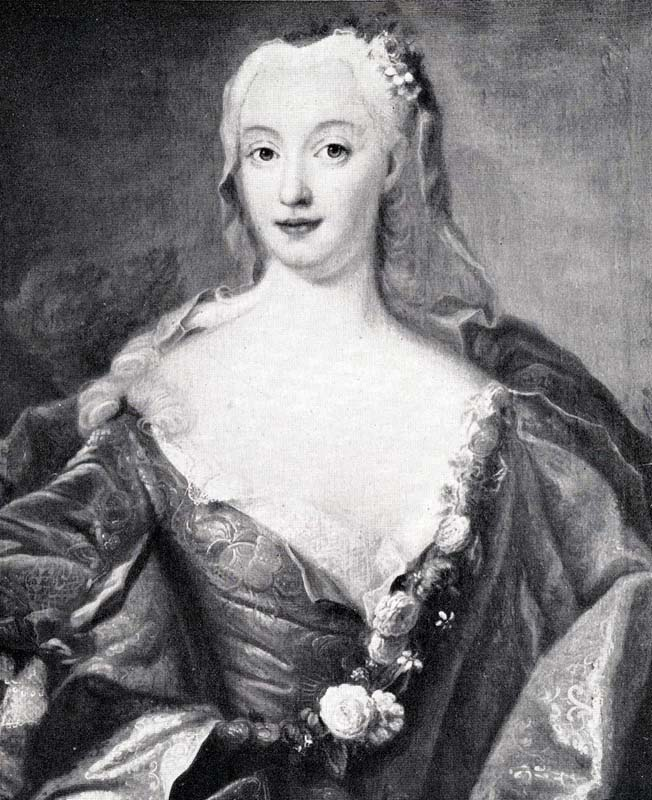
Hedvig Taube

- January 1
  - Kristijonas Donelaitis, Prussian-Lithuanian Lutheran pastor, poet, author of The Seasons (d. 1780)
  - Giovanni Battista Mancini, Italian soprano castrato, voice teacher and author of books on singing (d. 1800)
- January 6
  - John Christopher Hartwick, Lutheran minister in Colonial America, founder of Hartwick College (d. 1796)
  - Percivall Pott, English surgeon (d. 1788)
- January 9 – Elisabeth Stierncrona, Swedish noble (d. 1769)
- January 10 – Johann Georg Dominicus von Linprun, German scientist (d. 1787)
- January 16
  - Francis V de Beauharnais, French nobleman, soldier, politician, colonial governor and admiral (d. 1800)
  - Carl Jesper Benzelius, Swedish bishop (d. 1793)
- January 20 – Hugh Farmer, British theologian (d. 1787)
- January 21 – Anna Morandi Manzolini, internationally known Italian anatomist and anatomical wax modeler (d. 1774)
- January 24 – Henri Joseph Bouchard d'Esparbès de Lussan d'Aubeterre, Marshal of France (d. 1788)
- January 26 – Jean-Baptiste Pigalle, French sculptor (d. 1785)
- February 1
  - Nicolaus Christian Friis, Norwegian priest and writer (d. 1777)
  - Ralph Verney, 2nd Earl Verney of Ireland (d. 1791)
- February 2 – Gottfried August Homilius, German composer, cantor and organist (d. 1785)
- February 5 – Johann Gottlieb Gleditsch, German botanist (d. 1786)
- February 11 – Count Karl-Wilhelm Finck von Finckenstein, German-Prussian diplomat and later Prime Minister of Prussia (d. 1800)
- February 12 – Sebastian Sailer, German Premonstratensian preacher, writer (d. 1777)
- February 14 – William Vane, 2nd Viscount Vane of Ireland (d. 1789)
- February 18 – John Howe, 2nd Baron Chedworth of England, eldest son of John Howe (d. 1762)
- February 22
  - Louis-Georges de Bréquigny, French scholar (d. 1795)
  - Sarah Osborn, American writer (d. 1796)
- February 25
  - René Nicolas Charles Augustin de Maupeou, Chancellor of France (d. 1792)
  - Sir Hyde Parker, 5th Baronet, Royal Navy vice admiral (d. 1782)
- February 26 – James Hervey, English clergyman and writer (d. 1758)
- February 28 – Gioacchino Conti, Italian opera singer (d. 1761)
- March 1 – Aleksandr Aleksandrovich Menshikov, Russian army officer (d. 1764)
- March 2 – John Hamilton, Royal Navy officer (d. 1755)
- March 6 – Jean-Baptiste Marie Pierre, French painter (d. 1789)
- March 7 – Charles Thomas, Prince of Löwenstein-Wertheim-Rochefort, German nobleman, head of the House of Löwenstein-Wertheim-Rochefort (d. 1789)
- March 8 – Carl Philipp Emanuel Bach, German Classical composer (d. 1788)
- March 11 – Cornelis Elout, Dutch regent (d. 1779)
- March 17 – Maximilian Reichsgraf von Hamilton, German-born Czech Catholic bishop (d. 1776)
- March 19 – Aymar Joseph de Roquefeuil et du Bousquet, French admiral (d. 1782)
- March 21 – Charles Pratt, 1st Earl Camden, British judge (d. 1794)
- March 25
  - Friedrich Christian Glume, German artist (d. 1752)
  - Matthew Griswold (governor), 17th Governor of Connecticut (1784–1786) (d. 1799)
- March 27 – Francesco Antonio Zaccaria, Italian theologian (d. 1795)
- March 29 – Mahadhammaraza Dipadi, last Toungoo Dynasty king of Burma (Myanmar) (1733–1752) (d. 1754)
- April 1 – Jean-François de Neufforge, Flemish architect and engraver (d. 1791)
- April 7 – John Elwes (politician), British politician (d. 1789)
- April 14 – Adam Gib, Scottish religious leader (d. 1788)
- April 15 – Claude Yvon, French encyclopedist (d. 1791)
- April 16 – Pedro António Avondano, Italian composer (d. 1782)
- April 18 – Jacques-Nompar III de Caumont, duc de La Force, French nobleman (d. 1755)
- April 25 – Emer de Vattel, Swiss philosopher (d. 1767)
- May 6
  - Anton Raaff, German opera tenor (d. 1797)
  - James Townley, British dramatist (d. 1778)
- May 10 – Sophie Charlotte Ackermann, German actress from Berlin (d. 1792)
- May 12 – Johan Daniel Berlin, Norwegian composer and organist (d. 1787)
- May 14 – William Whitmore, British general (d. 1771)
- May 17 – Princess Anne Charlotte of Lorraine, French royal (d. 1773)
- May 20 – Henry Bathurst, 2nd Earl Bathurst, British lawyer and politician (d. 1794)
- June 6 – Joseph I of Portugal, Prince of Brazil (d. 1777)
- June 17 – César-François Cassini de Thury, French astronomer and cartographer (d. 1784)
- June 23 – Giovanni Sarnelli, Italian painter (d. 1793)
- July 1 – Michael Lally (brigadier-general), Irish-born French brigadier-general (d. 1773)
- July 2 – Christoph Willibald Gluck, German composer (d. 1787)
- July 8
  - Friedrich Gottfried Abel, German physician (d. 1794)
  - Pieter van Reede van Oudtshoorn, Dutch administrator of the Cape Colony (d. 1773)
- July 12 – Mikhail Illarionovich Vorontsov, Russian noble, politician (d. 1767)
- July 16 – Marc René, marquis de Montalembert, French military engineer and writer (d. 1800)
- July 17
  - Alexander Gottlieb Baumgarten, German philosopher (d. 1762)
  - John Forbes (Royal Navy officer), British admiral of the fleet (d. 1796)
- July 21 – Grand Duchess Natalya Alexeyevna of Russia (1714–1728), Russian grand duchess (d. 1728)
- August 1
  - Edward Penny, British painter (d. 1791)
  - Richard Wilson (painter), Welsh landscape painter (d. 1782)
- August 14 – Claude Joseph Vernet, French painter (d. 1789)
- August 15 – Philip Stanhope, 2nd Earl Stanhope of Great Britain (d. 1786)
- August 18 – Landgravine Caroline of Hesse-Rotenburg, German noble (d. 1741)
- August 23 – Hans Jacob Scheel, Norwegian general (d. 1774)
- August 28
  - Duke Anthony Ulrich of Brunswick, Russian general (d. 1774)
  - Jean-Baptiste Descamps, Flemish painter and art historian (d. 1791)
- August 27 – Angélique du Coudray, pioneering French midwife (d. 1794)
- August 29 – Princess Friederike Luise of Prussia, Prussian princess (d. 1784)
- September 1 – Samuel Martin (Secretary to the Treasury), British politician (d. 1788)
- September 10 – Niccolò Jommelli, Italian composer (d. 1774)
- September 17 – Gottlieb Rabener, German writer of prose satires (d. 1771)
- September 19 – Charles Humphreys, miller and statesman from Haverford Township, Pennsylvania (d. 1786)
- September 23 – Eugene Jean, Count of Soissons, Prince of Savoy (d. 1734)
- September 24 – Alaungpaya, King of Burma (d. 1760)
- September 29
  - Petrus Albertus van der Parra, Dutch colonial governor (d. 1775)
  - Johann Joachim Schwabe, German poet (d. 1784)
- September 30 – Étienne Bonnot de Condillac, French academic (d. 1780)
- October 1
  - Georg David Anthon, Danish architect (d. 1781)
  - António of Braganza, Child of Palhavã, Portuguese nobleman (d. 1800)
- October 3 – Joseph Spencer, American general (d. 1789)
- October 14 – Christoph Anton Migazzi, Austrian Catholic bishop (d. 1803)
- October 16 – Giovanni Arduino, Italian geologist (d. 1795)
- October 19 – Joseph von Petrasch, German philologist (d. 1772)
- October 25 – James Burnett, Lord Monboddo, Scottish judge, scholar of language evolution and philosopher (d. 1799)
- October 26 – Princess Marie Victoire d'Arenberg, Margravine of Baden-Baden as consort of Augustus George (d. 1793)
- October 27 – Fernando de Silva, 12th Duke of Alba, Spanish duke (d. 1776)
- October 31 – Hedvig Taube, Swedish courtier (d. 1744)
- November 1 – Johann Joachim Spalding, German theologian (d. 1804)
- November 2 – Camillo Almici, Italian priest (d. 1779)
- November 3 – Anica Bošković, Ragusan writer (d. 1804)
- November 4 – John Boyle, 3rd Earl of Glasgow, Scottish nobleman (d. 1775)
- November 10 – Mathieu Tillet, French botanist (d. 1791)
- November 18 – William Shenstone, English poet and landscape gardener (d. 1763)
- November 24 – Thomas Zebrowski, Lithuanian Jesuit scientist (d. 1758)
- November 26 – Pierre-François Brice, French artist (d. 1794)
- November 27 – Jean Philippe Goujon de Grondel, French general (d. 1807)
- December 1 – Pierre Gaultier de La Vérendrye, French-Canadian explorer (d. 1755)
- December 3 – Edward Pickard, British minister (d. 1778)
- December 4 – Israel Acrelius, Swedish missionary and clergyman (d. 1800)
- December 14 – Leonard Lispenard, American politician (d. 1790)
- December 15 – Étienne Mignot de Montigny, French engineer, geographer (d. 1782)
- December 16 – George Whitefield, English Anglican priest (d. 1770)
- December 18
  - Philippine Élisabeth d'Orléans, French princess (d. 1734)
  - Nikolaus I, Prince Esterházy, Hungarian prince (d. 1790)
- December 19 – John Winthrop (educator), 2nd Hollis Professor of Mathematics and Natural Philosophy in Harvard College (d. 1779)
- December 21
  - John Bradstreet, British Army officer during King George's War (d. 1774)
  - Paschen von Cossel, German lawyer (d. 1805)
- December 23
  - Ranieri de' Calzabigi, Italian poet and librettist (d. 1795)
  - William Howard, Viscount Andover, British MP (d. 1756)
- December 31
  - Michel Ferdinand d'Albert d'Ailly, French astronomer (d. 1769)
  - Arima Yoriyuki, Japanese daimyō (d. 1783)

== Deaths ==
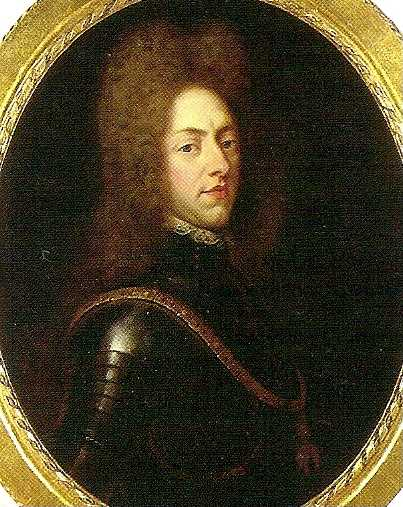
Eugen Alexander Franz

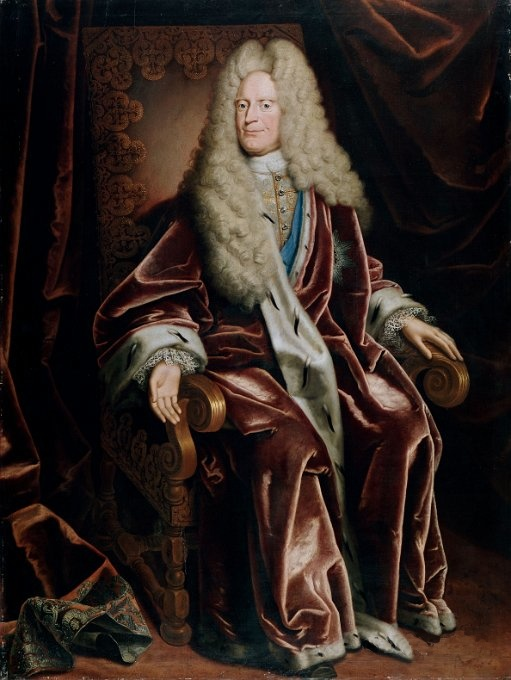
Anthony Ulrich, Duke of Brunswick-Wolfenbüttel

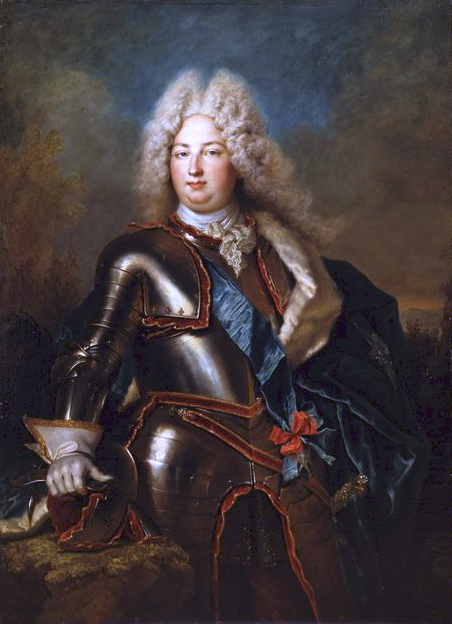
Charles, Duke of Berry

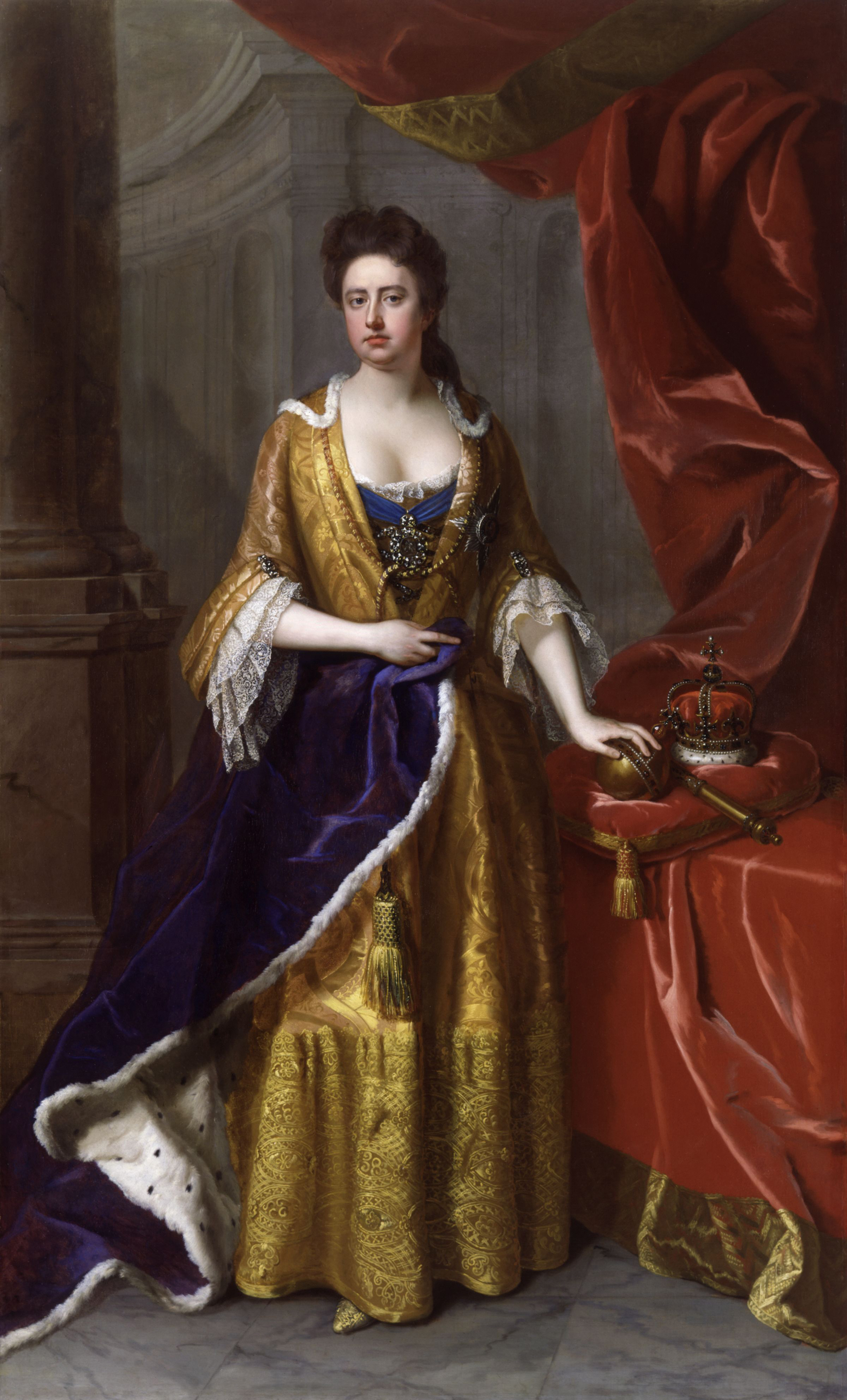
Anne, Queen of Great Britain

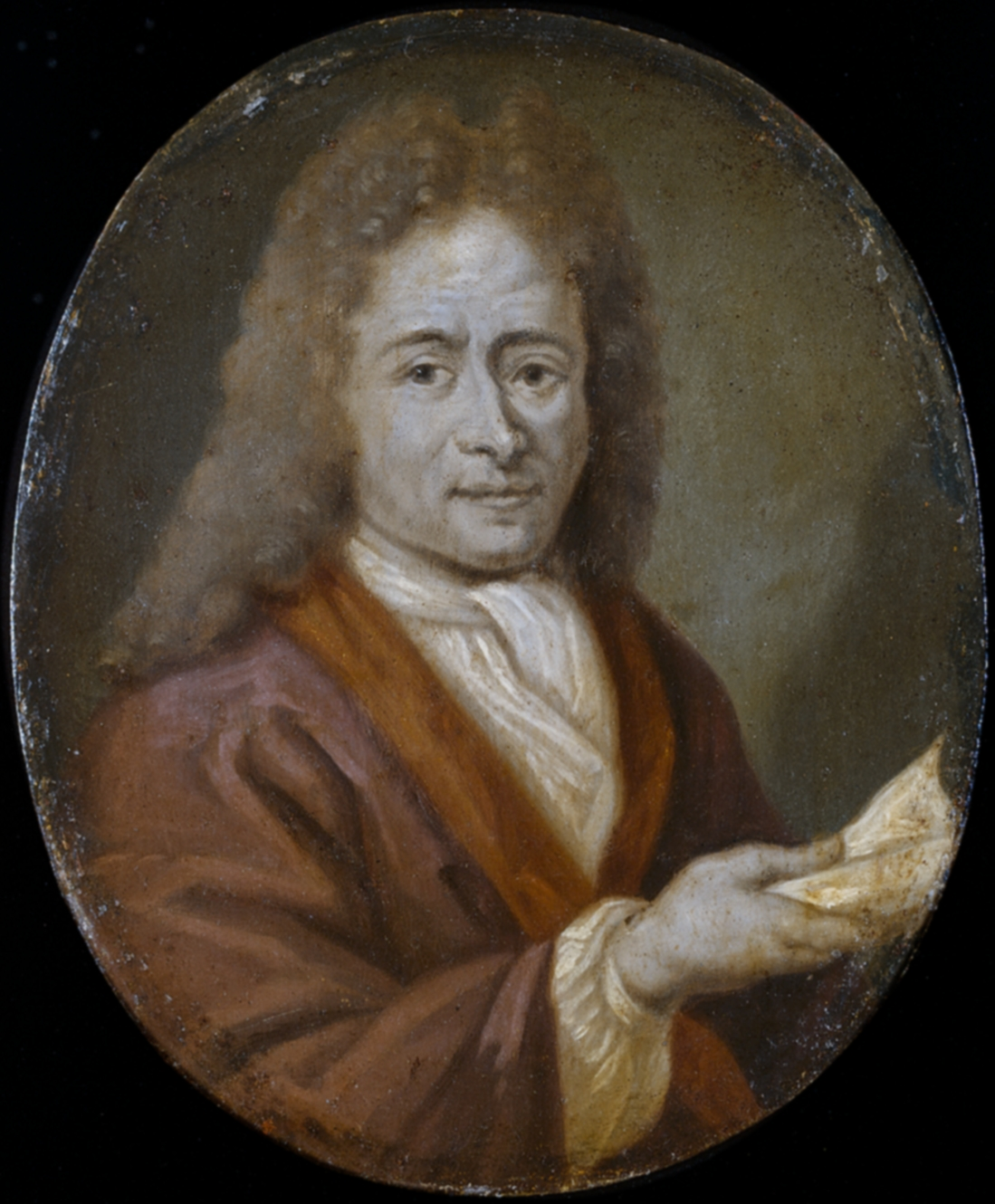
Christoffel Pierson

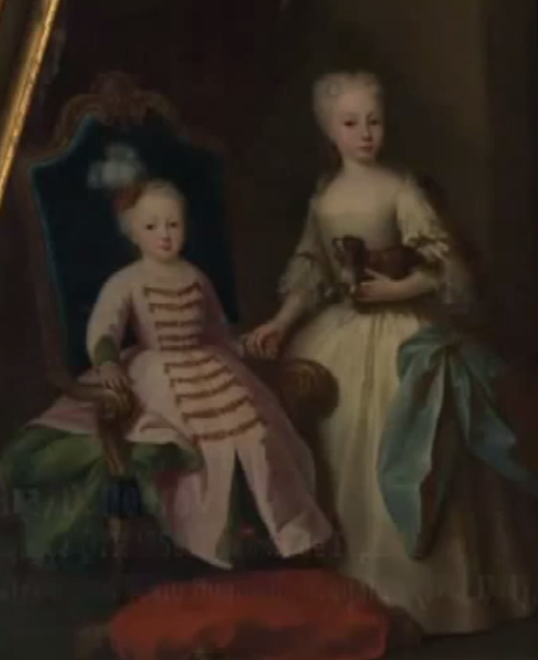
Pedro, Prince of Brazil

- January 4 – Atto Melani, Italian opera singer (b. 1626)
- January 5 – Mamia III Gurieli, Prince of Guria
- January 10 – Constantin Ranst de Jonge, son of Hieronimus Rans(t) (1607–1660) (b. 1635)
- January 17 – Gabriel Álvarez de Toledo, Royal Librarian of King Felipe V of Spain (b. 1662)
- February 2 – John Sharp, English Archbishop of Yorkshire (b. 1643)
- February 21 – Eugen Alexander Franz, 1st Prince of Thurn and Taxis (b. 1652)
- February 24 – Edmund Andros, English governor in North America (b. 1637)
- March 3 – Hans Carl von Carlowitz, German forester (b. 1645)
- March 13 – John Talbot of Lacock, British politician and general (b. 1630)
- March 27
  - Charlotte Amalie of Hesse-Kassel, Queen Consort of Denmark (1670–1699) (b. 1650)
  - Anthony Ulrich, Duke of Brunswick-Wolfenbüttel (b. 1633)
- April 10 – Samuel Carpenter, Deputy Governor of colonial Pennsylvania (b. 1649)
- April 15 – Esther Liebmann, German banker (b. 1649)
- April 17
  - Philipp Heinrich Erlebach, German composer (b. 1657)
  - Haquin Spegel, Swedish bishop (b. 1645)
- May 5
  - Charles, Duke of Berry, grandson of Louis XIV of France (b. 1686)
  - Nathaniel Lawrence, MP for Colchester (b. c. 1627)
- May 15 – Roger Elliott, British general and Governor of Gibraltar (b. c. 1665)
- May 18 – Ivan Botsis, Russian admiral of Greek origin (unknown birth date)
- May 24 – Henry Somerset, 2nd Duke of Beaufort (b. 1684)
- May 27 – George Saunderson, 5th Viscount Castleton, English Member of Parliament (b. 1631)
- May 30 – Gottfried Arnold, German church historian (b. 1666)
- June 8 – Electress Sophia of Hanover, heir to the throne of Great Britain (b. 1630)
- June 22 – Matthew Henry, English non-conformist minister (b. 1662)
- June 28 – Daniel Papebroch, Flemish Jesuit hagiographer (b. 1628)
- July 4 – Antonio Magliabechi, Italian librarian (b. 1633)
- August 1 – Anne, Queen of Great Britain (b. 1665)
- August 11 – Christoffel Pierson, Dutch painter (b. 1631)
- August 26 – Constantin Brâncoveanu, Prince of Wallachia (b. 1654)
- August 26 – Edward Fowler, English Bishop of Gloucester (b. 1632)
- September 20 – Anna Waser, Swiss painter (b. 1678)
- September 27 – Thomas Britton, English concert promoter (b. 1644)
- October – Raja Sitaram Ray, autonomous king, vassal of the Mughal Empire (b. 1658)
- October 3 – Jeanne Le Ber, religious recluse in New France (b. 1662)
- October 5 – Kaibara Ekiken, Japanese philosopher (b. 1630)
- October 10 – Pierre Le Pesant, sieur de Boisguilbert, French economist (b. 1646)
- October 25 – Sébastien Leclerc, French painter (b. 1637)
- October 29 – Pedro, Prince of Brazil, second child of John V of Portugal and Maria Ana of Austria (b. 1712)
- November 5 – Bernardino Ramazzini, Italian physician (b. 1633)
- November 7 – Charles Davenant, English economist, politician and pamphleteer (b. 1656)
- November 8 – Filippo II Colonna, Italian noble (b. 1663)
- November 29 – Jerolim Kavanjin, Croatian poet (b. 1641)
- December 10 – Anthony Günther, Prince of Anhalt-Zerbst (b. 1653)
- December 29 – Charles Churchill, British general (b. 1656)
- December 30 – François Adhémar de Monteil, Comte de Grignan, French aristocrat (b. 1632)
- date unknown – Julianna Géczy, Hungarian heroine (b. 1680)
