= 1795 =

1795 in various calendars
- Gregorian calendar: 1795; MDCCXCV
- French Republican calendar: 3–4; III–IV
- Ab urbe condita: 2548
- Armenian calendar: 1244; ԹՎ ՌՄԽԴ
- Assyrian calendar: 6545
- Balinese saka calendar: 1716–1717
- Bengali calendar: 1201–1202
- Berber calendar: 2745
- British Regnal year: 35 Geo. 3 – 36 Geo. 3
- Buddhist calendar: 2339
- Burmese calendar: 1157
- Byzantine calendar: 7303–7304
- Chinese calendar: 甲寅年 (Wood Tiger); 4492 or 4285 — to — 乙卯年 (Wood Rabbit); 4493 or 4286
- Coptic calendar: 1511–1512
- Discordian calendar: 2961
- Ethiopian calendar: 1787–1788
- Hebrew calendar: 5555–5556
- Hindu calendars
- Vikram Samvat: 1851–1852
- Shaka Samvat: 1716–1717
- Kali Yuga: 4895–4896
- Holocene calendar: 11795
- Igbo calendar: 795–796
- Iranian calendar: 1173–1174
- Islamic calendar: 1209–1210
- Japanese calendar: Kansei 7 (寛政７年)
- Javanese calendar: 1721–1722
- Julian calendar: Gregorian minus 11 days
- Korean calendar: 4128
- Minguo calendar: 117 before ROC 民前117年
- Nanakshahi calendar: 327
- Thai solar calendar: 2337–2338
- Tibetan calendar: ཤིང་ཕོ་སྟག་ལོ་ (male Wood-Tiger); 1921 or 1540 or 768 — to — ཤིང་མོ་ཡོས་ལོ་ (female Wood-Hare); 1922 or 1541 or 769

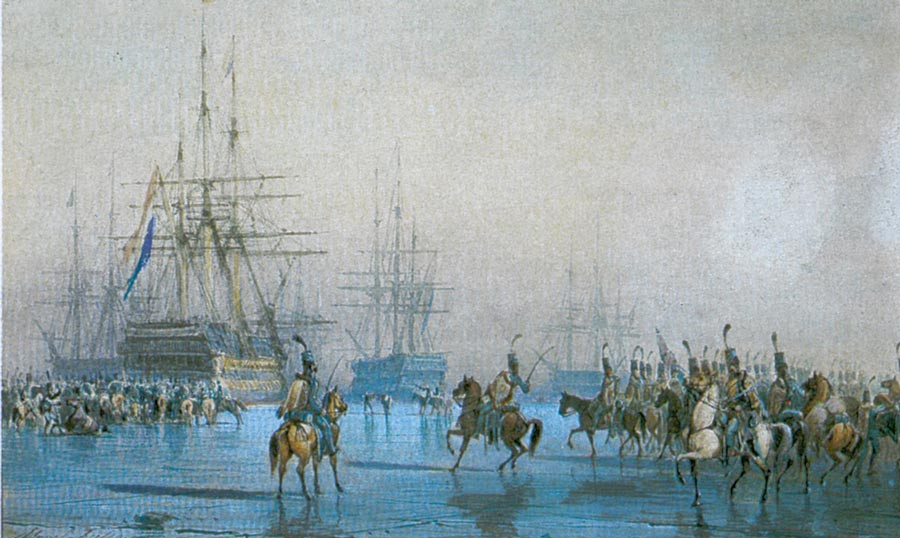
January 23: The Dutch Navy fleet, trapped in ice, is captured by French Hussars on horseback

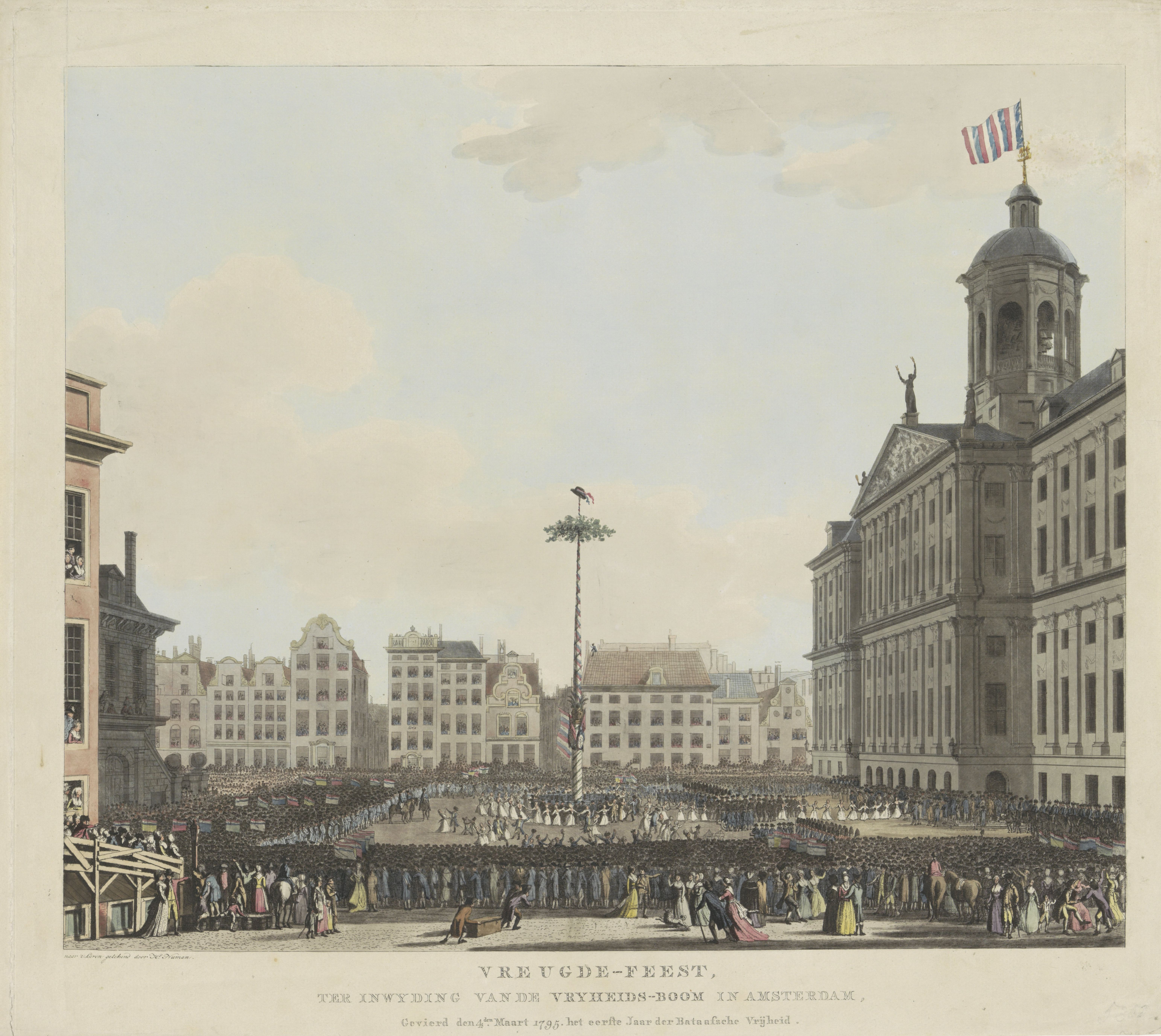
January 18: Batavian Revolution in Amsterdam

1795 (MDCCXCV) was a common year starting on Thursday of the Gregorian calendar and a common year starting on Monday of the Julian calendar, the 1795th year of the Common Era (CE) and Anno Domini (AD) designations, the 795th year of the 2nd millennium, the 95th year of the 18th century, and the 6th year of the 1790s decade. As of the start of 1795, the Gregorian calendar was 11 days ahead of the Julian calendar, which remained in localized use until 1923.

== Events ==
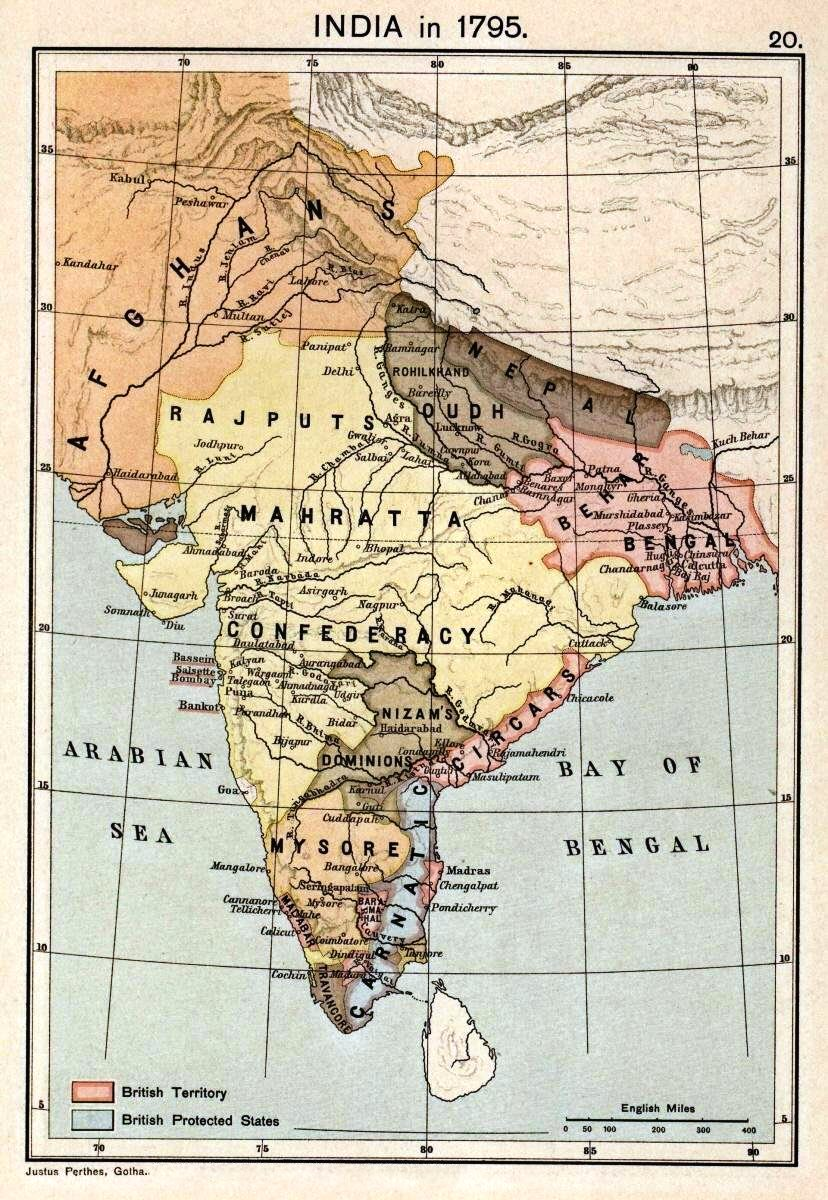
Map of India in 1795, map indicates the political end of the Mogul dynasty in India.

=== January–June ===
- January – Central England records its coldest ever month, in the CET records dating back to 1659.
- January 14 – The University of North Carolina opens to students at Chapel Hill, becoming the first state university in the United States.
- January 16 – War of the First Coalition: Flanders campaign: The French occupy Utrecht, Netherlands.
- January 18 – Batavian Revolution in Amsterdam: William V, Prince of Orange, Stadtholder of the Dutch Republic (Republic of the Seven United Netherlands), flees the country.
- January 19 – The Batavian Republic is proclaimed in Amsterdam, ending the Dutch Republic (Republic of the Seven United Netherlands).
- January 20 – French troops enter Amsterdam.
- January 23 – Flanders campaign: Capture of the Dutch fleet at Den Helder: The Dutch fleet, frozen in Zuiderzee, is captured by the French 8th Hussars.
- February 7 – The Eleventh Amendment to the United States Constitution is passed.
- March – English Benedictine monks expelled from Douai are permitted to proceed to England.
- March 13–14 – War of the First Coalition Battle of Genoa: The British and Neapolitan fleets are victorious over the French.
- March 29 – Ludwig van Beethoven makes his public debut in Vienna performing his Second Piano Concerto under the baton of his teacher Antonio Salieri.
- April 5 – The Peace of Basel is signed, between France and Prussia.
- April 7 – The metric system is adopted in France.
- April 8 – George, Prince of Wales, marries Caroline of Brunswick.
- April 23
  - Former Governor-General of India Warren Hastings is acquitted by the British House of Lords of misconduct.
  - Sweden becomes the first monarchy to recognize the French Republic - Swedish ambassador introduced into the French Convention.
- May 1 – Unification of Hawai‘i: Battle of Nuʻuanu: Kamehameha I of the Island of Hawaii defeats the Oahuans, solidifying his control of the major islands of the archipelago and officially founding the Kingdom of Hawaii.
- May 31 – French Revolution: Revolutionary Tribunal suppressed.
- May–June – The Battle of Richmond Hill is fought in the colony of New South Wales, between the Darug people and British colonial forces.
- June 3 – The Dialectic and Philanthropic Societies are founded at the University of North Carolina at Chapel Hill.
- June 5–7 – The Copenhagen Fire of 1795, starting in a naval warehouse, destroys 941 houses.
- June 8 – Louis XVII, Prince Royal and titular King of France, dies in captivity in the Temple (Paris) and will be buried in an unmarked grave. The heir to the French throne, his uncle Louis XVIII, succeeds him as titular king (he will become the actual king on April 6, 1814). On June 28, the French republican government announces the death, due to mycobacterial cervical lymphadenitis (many doubt the statement).
- June 16–17 – War of the First Coalition: Cornwallis's Retreat – A British Royal Navy battle squadron commanded by William Cornwallis fends off a numerically superior French Navy fleet, off the coast of Brittany.
- June 24 – The United States Senate ratifies the Jay Treaty with Great Britain.
- June 27 – War of the First Coalition:
  - British forces land off Quiberon to aid the revolt in Brittany.
  - French troops recapture St. Lucia.

=== July–December ===
- July 22 – The Second Treaty of Basel is signed between the French First Republic and Spain, ending the War of the Pyrenees. Spain cedes its half of the Caribbean island of Hispaniola to France.
- July 25 – Construction of the Pontcysyllte Aqueduct in Wales begins.
- August 3 – The signing of the Treaty of Greenville puts an end to the Northwest Indian War.
- August 14 – President Washington signs the Jay Treaty with Britain on behalf of the United States.
- August 17 – A large slave rebellion occurs in Curaçao, suppressed the following month.
- August 22 – French Revolution: The Constitution of the Year III is ratified by the National Convention.
- August 25 – British forces capture Trincomalee, Ceylon.
- August 28 – The Third Treaty of Basel is signed, between the French First Republic and the Landgraviate of Hesse-Kassel.
- September 5 – The United States signs a treaty with the Dey of Algiers, ruled by Baba Hassan, pledging the payment of $23,000 a year tribute to prevent piracy against American ships.
- September 11 – Battle of Krtsanisi: The Persian emperor Agha Mohammad Khan Qajar defeats the forces of Heraclius II of Georgia.
- September 15 – French Revolutionary Wars – Invasion of the Cape Colony: British forces capture Cape Town in the Dutch Cape Colony, to use its strategic facilities against the French Navy.
- September 21 – Battle of the Diamond: Protestant forces defeat Catholic troops in Loughgall, Ireland, leading to the foundation of the Orange Order.
- September 28 – The Alliance of St Petersburg is formed between Britain, Russia and Austria against France.
- October 1 – The Austrian Netherlands is annexed to the French Republic, as the Belgian departments.
- October 2 – British forces capture the Île d'Yeu off the coast of Brittany.
- October 5 – 13 Vendémiaire: Royalist riots in Paris are crushed by troops under Paul Barras and newly-reinstalled artillery officer Napoleon Bonaparte.
- October 20 – The United States signs a treaty with Spain, opening commerce along the Mississippi River to the Gulf of Mexico, and establishing boundaries between U.S. territory and Spanish Florida.
- October 24 – The Third Partition of Poland is made, dividing the territory of the Commonwealth of Poland between the Habsburg monarchy, Prussia and the Russian Empire. On November 25, Stanisław August Poniatowski formally abdicates as last King of Poland.
- October 27 – The United States and Spain sign the Treaty of Madrid, which establishes the boundaries between Spanish colonies and the U.S.
- November 2 – French Revolution: The French Directory takes power; the influence of the Sans-culottes declines.
- December 13 – Wold Cottage meteorite: A meteorite falls at Wold Newton, a hamlet in Yorkshire in England. This meteorite fall is subsequently used as a literary premise by science fiction writer Philip José Farmer, as the basis for the Wold Newton family.
- December 28 – Construction of Yonge Street, formerly recognized as the longest street in the world, begins in York, Upper Canada (modern-day Toronto).

=== Undated ===
- The Hudson's Bay Company trading post Fort Edmonton is constructed; the city of Edmonton, Alberta, eventually grows from it.
- The British Royal Navy makes the use of lemon juice mandatory, to prevent scurvy.
- The harvest fails in Munich.
- Daniel McGinnis discovers the supposed Money Pit on Oak Island, Nova Scotia. (according to one story)
- Jim Beam is founded as Old Jake Beam Sour Mash.

== Births ==
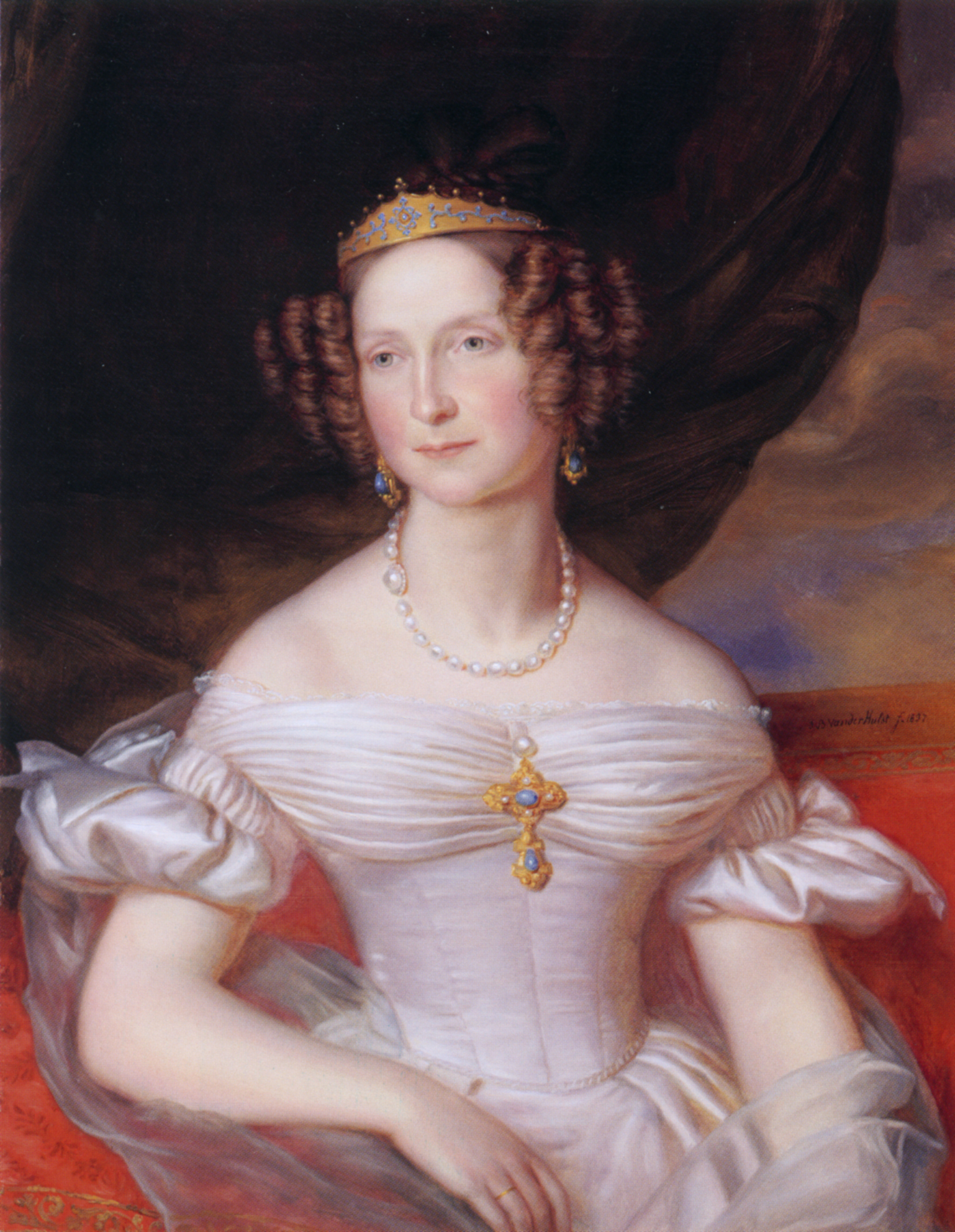
Anna Pavlovna of Russia

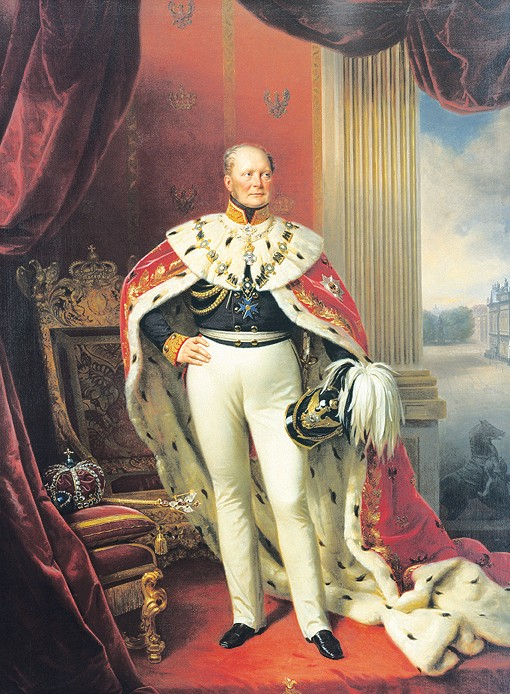
Frederick William IV of Prussia

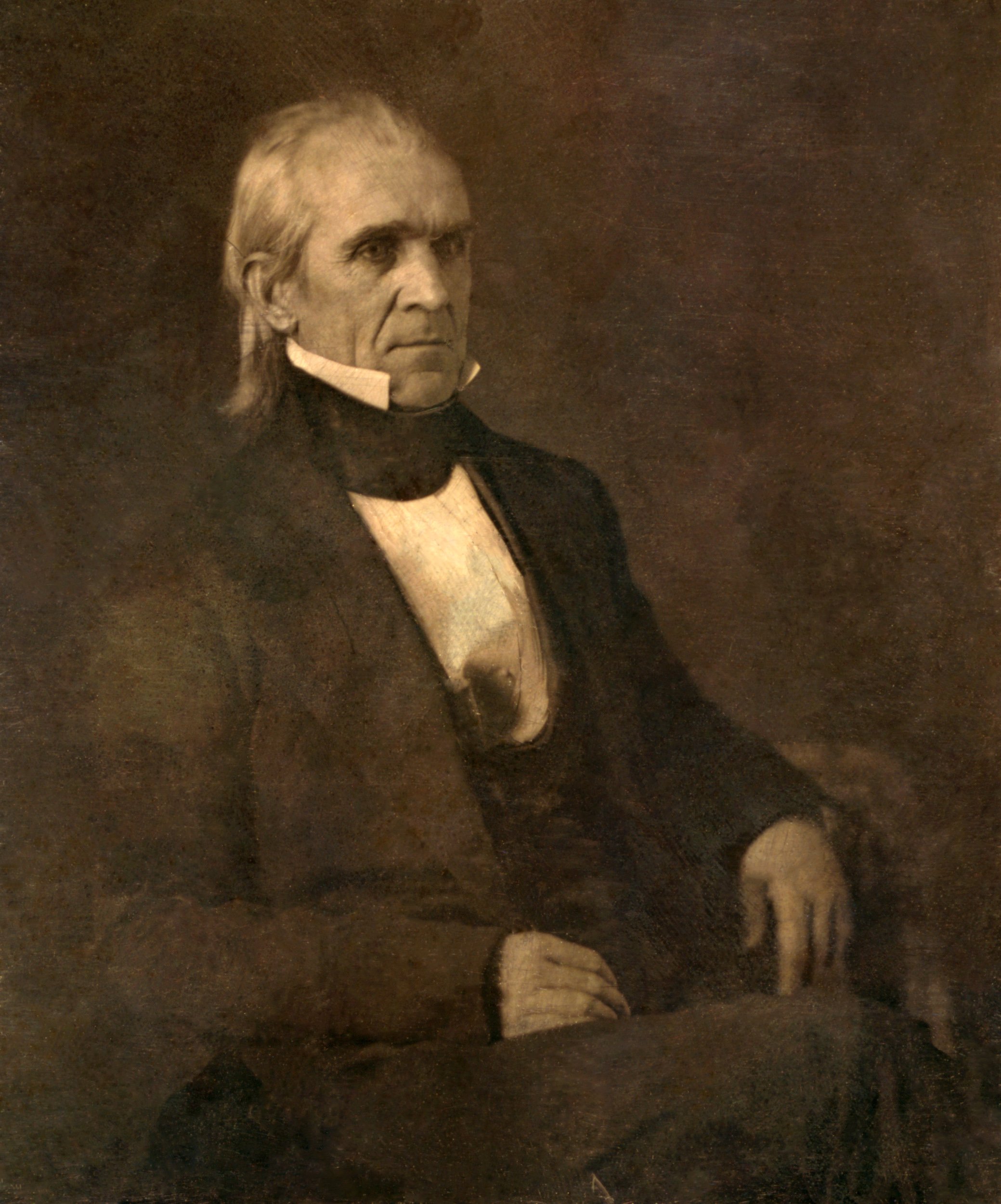
James K. Polk

- January 6 – Anselme Payen, French chemist (d. 1878)
- January 18 – Anna Pavlovna of Russia, queen consort of the Netherlands (d. 1865)
- January 26 – Policarpa Salavarrieta, Colombian spy, revolutionary heroine working for the independence of Colombia (d. 1817)
- February 3 – Antonio José de Sucre, Venezuelan revolutionary leader, general and statesman (d. 1830)
- February 4 – Jakob von Hartmann, Bavarian general (d. 1873)
- February 18 – George Peabody, American businessman and "father of modern philanthropy" (d. 1869)
- February 16 – Sarah Ann Gill, Barbadian national heroine (d. 1866)
- March 12 – William Lyon Mackenzie, Scottish-born Canadian journalist, 1st Mayor of Toronto (d. 1861)
- March 14 – Robert Lucas Pearsall, English-born composer, sets "In dulce jubilo" (d. 1856)
- May 4 – Annestine Beyer, Danish reform pedagogue (d. 1884)
- May 19 – Johns Hopkins, American businessman and philanthropist (d. 1873)
- May 23 – Charles Barry, English architect (d. 1860)
- June 11 – Sara Torsslow, Swedish actor (d. 1859)
- June 13 – Thomas Arnold, English school reformer (d. 1842)
- June 19 – James Braid, Scottish surgeon, hypnotism pioneer (d. 1860)
- June 21 – José María Pinedo, Argentinian naval commander (d. 1885)
- June 24 – Ernst Heinrich Weber, German physician, psychologist (d. 1878)
- July 5 – Georg Ernst Ludwig Hampe, German pharmacist, botanist and bryologist (d. 1880)
- July 7 – Prince Karl Theodor of Bavaria, Bavarian field marshal (d. 1875)
- August 25 – Luis José de Orbegoso, Peruvian general and politician, 11th and 12th President of Peru (d. 1847)
- August 27 – Giorgio Mitrovich, Maltese politician (d. 1885)
- September 1 – James Gordon Bennett, American newspaper publisher (d. 1872)
- September 6 – Achille Baraguey d'Hilliers, Marshal of France (d. 1878)
- September 7 – John William Polidori, English writer and physician (d. 1821)
- September 16 – Saverio Mercadante, Italian composer (d. 1870)
- September 18 – Kondraty Ryleyev, Russian poet, Decembrist (d. 1826)
- October 13 – James McDowell, American politician (d. 1851)
- October 15 – King Frederick William IV of Prussia (d. 1861)
- October 16 – William Buell Sprague, American clergyman, author (d. 1876)
- October 26 – Nikolaos Mantzaros, Greek composer (d. 1872)
- October 31 – John Keats, English poet (d. 1821)
- November 2 – James K. Polk, 11th President of the United States (d. 1849)
- November 12 – Thaddeus William Harris, American naturalist (d. 1856)
- December 2 – Guillermo (William) Miller, English-born military leader in Peru (d. 1861)
- December 3 – Rowland Hill, English teacher, inventor and social reformer (d. 1879)
- December 4 – Thomas Carlyle, Scottish-born writer, historian (d. 1881)
- December 10 – Matthias W. Baldwin, American locomotive manufacturer (d. 1866)
- December 21 – Leopold von Ranke, German historian (d. 1886)
- date unknown – Chief Oshkosh, Menominee chief (d. 1858)

== Deaths ==
=== January–March ===
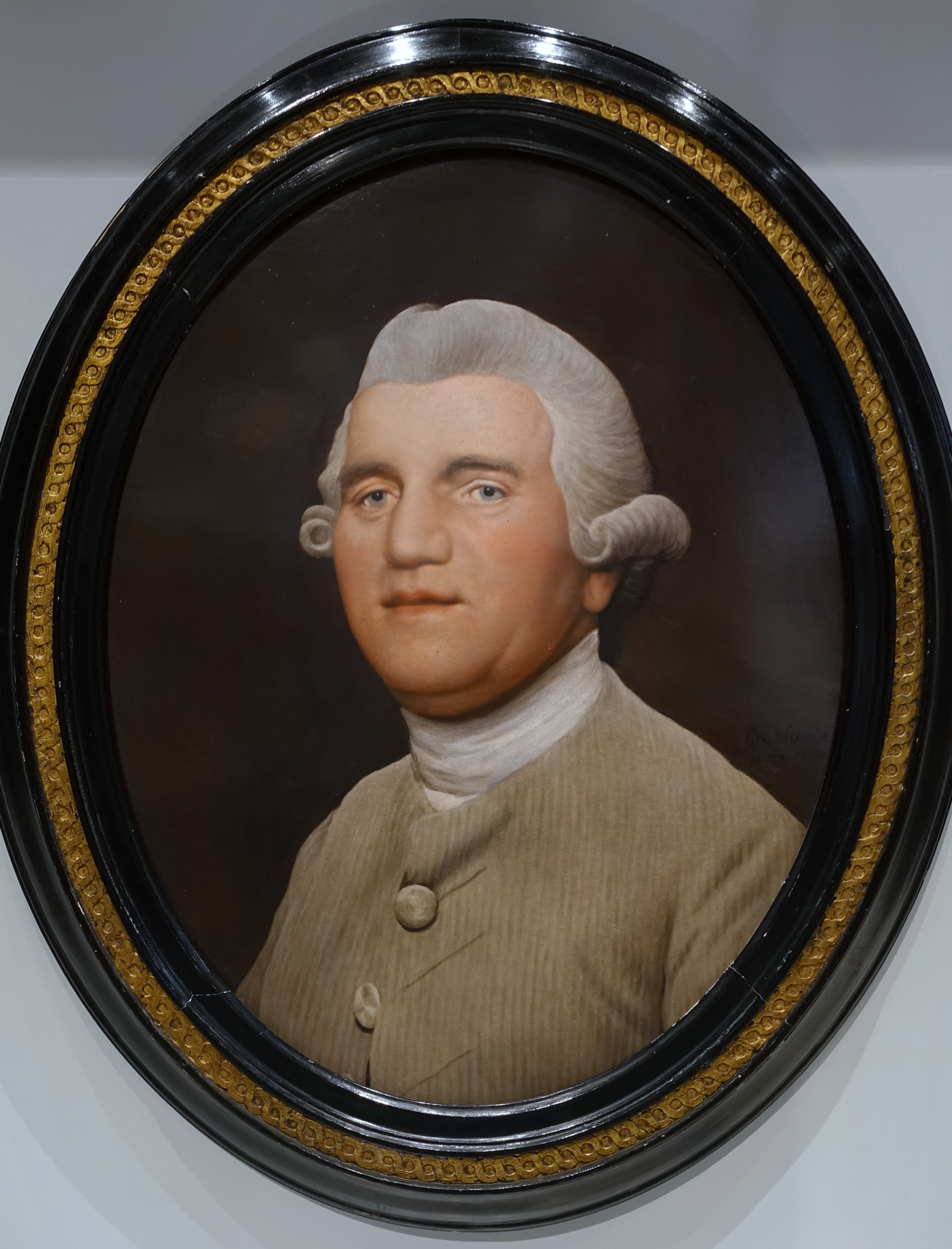
Josiah Wedgwood

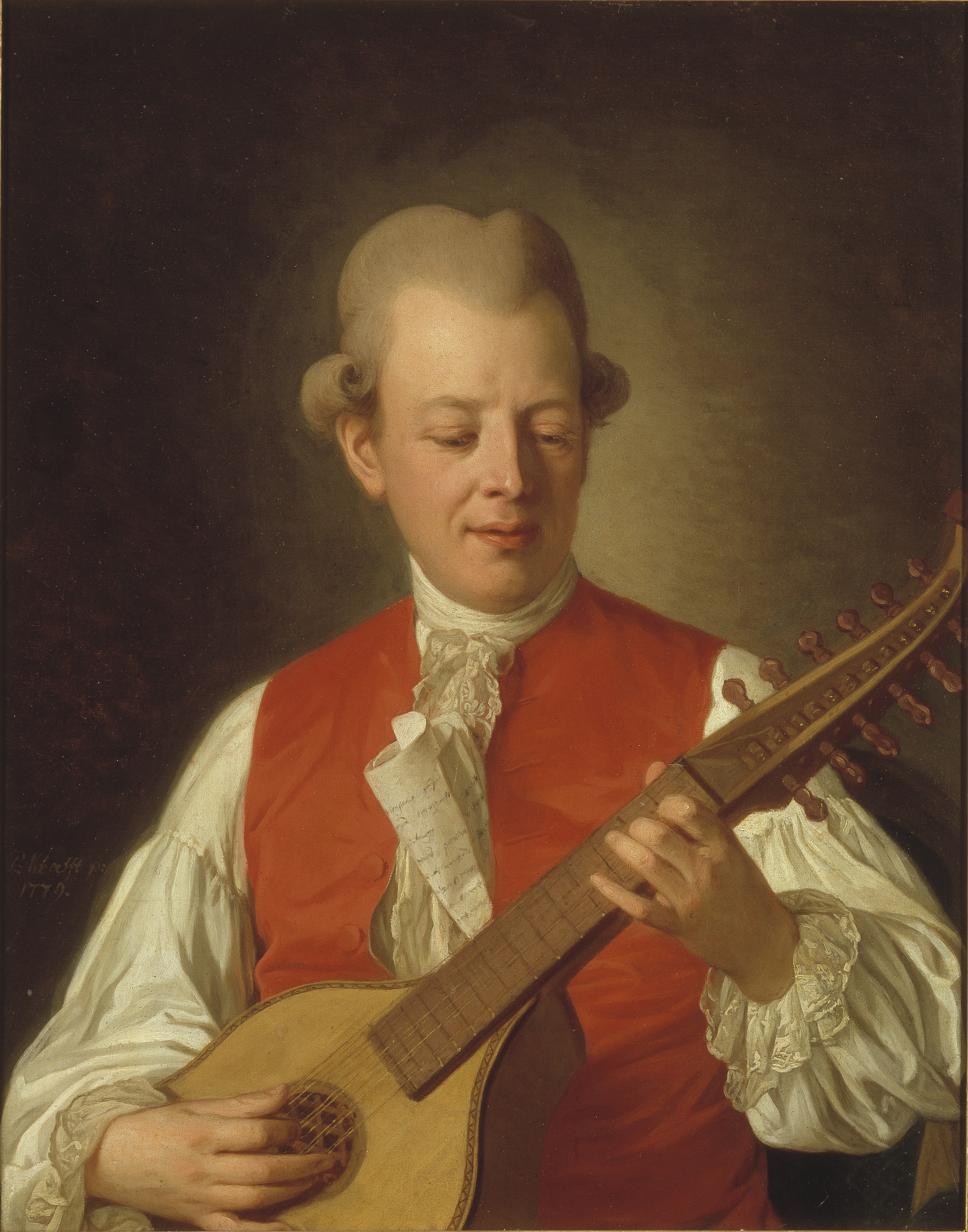
Carl Michael Bellman

- January 3 – Josiah Wedgwood, English potter, entrepreneur (b. 1730)
- January 5
  - Jacobo Fitz-James Stuart, 6th Duke of Liria and Jérica, Spanish noble (b. 1792)
  - Philipp Gotthard von Schaffgotsch, German Prince-Bishop (b. 1716)
- January 10 – David Blackburn, British Royal Navy officer (b. 1753)
- January 19 – Thomas Balguy, English churchman (b. 1716)
- January 21 – Samuel Wallis, English navigator (b. 1728)
- January 22 – Richard Clinton, officer in the Continental Army during the American Revolution (b. 1741)
- January 23 – John Sullivan, American general in the American Revolutionary War, delegate in the Continental Congress (b. 1740)
- January 25 – Morgan Edwards, Welsh-born clergyman (b. 1722)
- January 26 – Johann Christoph Friedrich Bach, German harpsichordist, composer (b. 1732)
- February 3 – Richard Edwards, British naval officer and colonial governor of Newfoundland (b. c. 1715)
- February 7 – Antoine Polier, Swiss adventurer (b. 1741)
- February 11 – Carl Michael Bellman, Swedish poet (b. 1740)
- February 14 – Samuel Cook Silliman, member of the Connecticut House of Representatives from Norwalk (b. 1741)
- February 27
  - Tanikaze Kajinosuke, Japanese sumo wrestler (b. 1750)
  - Richard Clarke, Massachusetts merchant (b. 1711)
- March 4 – John Collins, 3rd Governor of Rhode Island (b. 1717)
- March 5 – Josef Reicha, Czech cellist (b. 1752)
- March 9 – John Armstrong, Sr., American civil engineer and major general during the Revolutionary War (b. 1717)
- March 15 – Louisa Catharina Harkort, German ironmaster (b. 1718)
- March 18 – Jonathan Buck, founder of Bucksport, Maine (b. 1719)
- March 21
  - Giovanni Arduino, Italian geologist (b. 1714)
  - Honoré III, Prince of Monaco (b. 1720)

=== April–June ===
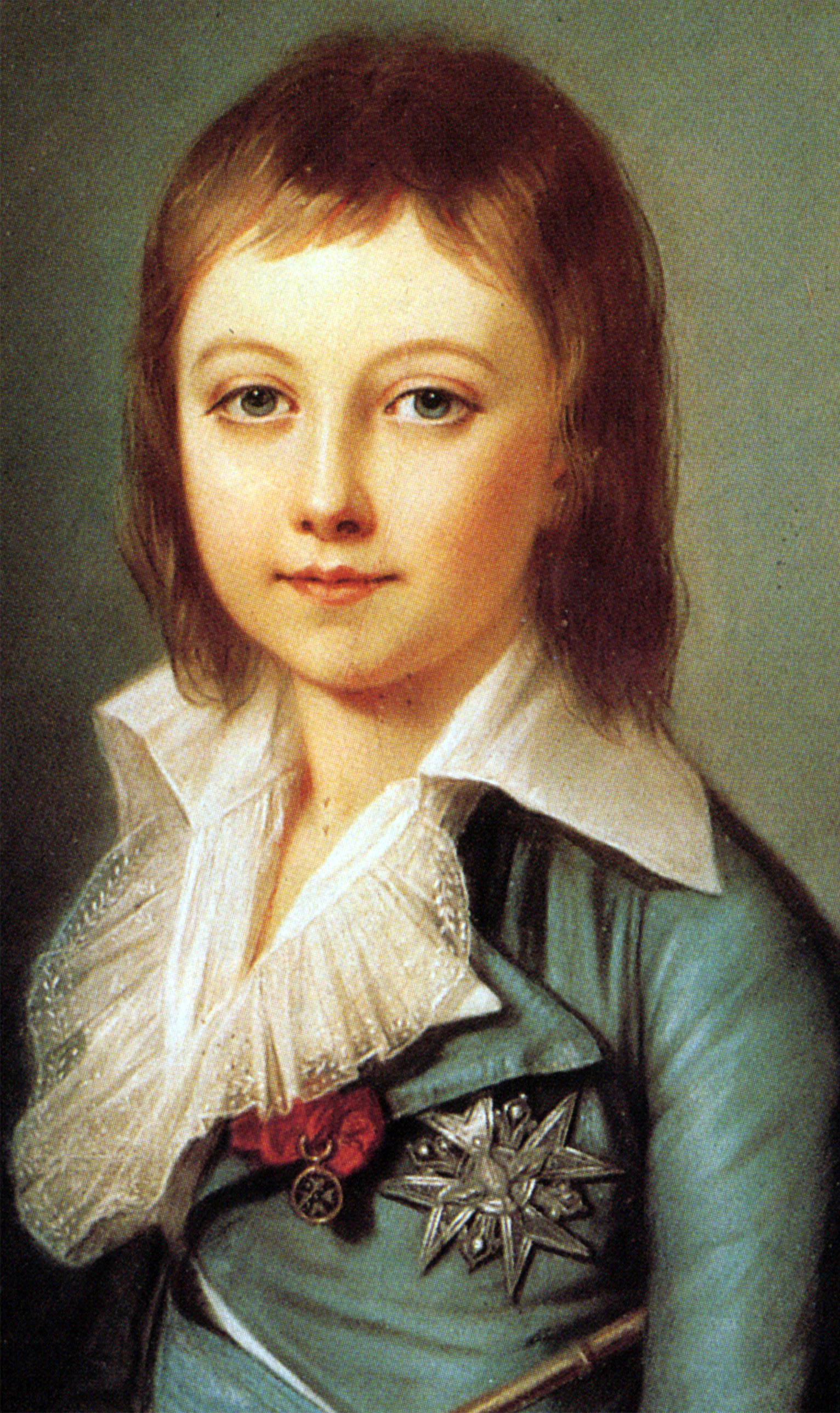
"Louis XVII" of France

- April 1 – Charles II August, Duke of Zweibrücken (b. 1746)
- April 6 – George Collier, British Royal Navy officer served during the Seven Years' War (b. 1738)
- April 12 – Johann Kaspar Basselet von La Rosée, Bavarian general (b. 1710)
- April 30 – Jean-Jacques Barthélemy, French writer and numismatist (b. 1716)
- May 2 – Increase Moseley, American politician (b. 1712)
- May 6 – Pieter Boddaert, Dutch physician and naturalist (b. 1730)
- May 7 – Antoine Quentin Fouquier-Tinville, French revolutionary leader (executed) (b. 1746)
- May 11 – Joachim Edler von Popper, Austrian banker (b. 1722)
- May 12 – Ezra Stiles, American academic, educator and author (b. 1727)
- May 17 – Thomas Pelham-Clinton, 3rd Duke of Newcastle, British Army general (b. 1752)
- May 18 – Robert Rogers, British Army officer and American colonial frontiersman (b. 1731)
- May 19
  - Josiah Bartlett, signer of the United States Declaration of Independence (b. 1729)
  - James Boswell, Scottish author (b. 1740)
- May 20
  - Francesco Paolo Di Blasi, Sicilian jurist (b. 1753)
  - Louis Eugene, Duke of Württemberg, third son of Duke Karl Alexander (b. 1731)
- May 27 – Thomas-Laurent Bédard, Canadian priest (b. 1747)
- June 1 – Pierre-Joseph Desault, French anatomist and surgeon (b. 1744)
- June 8 – Titular King Louis XVII of France (b. 1785)
- June 13 – Stephen Popham, British politician and solicitor (b. 1745)
- June 17 – Gilbert Romme, French politician and mathematician (b. 1750)
- June 18 – Marie Marguerite Bihéron, French anatomist (b. 1719)
- June 23 – James Craig, Scottish architect (b. 1739)
- June 24 – William Smellie, Scottish printer and encyclopedist (b. 1740)

=== July–September ===
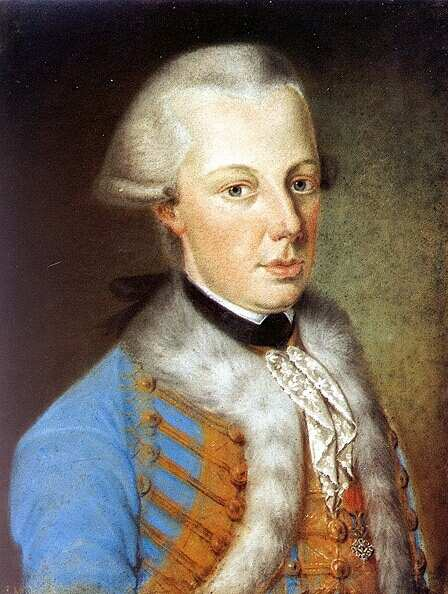
Archduke Alexander Leopold of Austria

- July 3
  - Louis-Georges de Bréquigny, French historian (b. 1714)
  - Antonio de Ulloa, Spanish general and governor of Louisiana (b. 1716)
- July 9 – Henry Seymour Conway, British general and statesman (b. 1721)
- July 10 – Omar Ali Saifuddin I, Sultan of Brunei since 1740 (b. 1711)
- July 12 – Archduke Alexander Leopold of Austria (b. 1772)
- July 27 – Louis Grégoire Deschamps Destournelles, French politician (b. 1744)
- July 28 – Zebulon Butler, American soldier and politician (b. 1731)
- July 31
  - Basílio da Gama, Portuguese poet and member of the Society of Jesus (b. 1740)
  - Grigory Shelikhov, Russian merchant (b. 1747)
- August 4 – Timothy Ruggles, American-born Tory politician (b. 1711)
- August 5 – William Fleming, Scottish-born physician and 3rd Governor of Virginia (b. 1729)
- August 14
  - George Adams, English optician and writer (b. 1750)
  - Marianne Ehrmann, Swiss-born journalist and novelist (b. 1755)
- August 19 – Friedrich Hartmann Graf, German flautist and composer (b. 1727)
- August 20 – William Jones, Welsh radical and antiquary (b. 1726)
- August 23 – William Bradford, American lawyer and judge (b. 1755)
- August 26 – Alessandro Cagliostro, Italian Freemason (b. 1743)
- August 31 – François-André Danican Philidor, French composer and chess player (b. 1726)
- September 3 – Benjamin Beddome, English Baptist minister and hymnist (b. 1717)
- September 22 – Sayat-Nova, Armenian musician and poet (b. 1712)
- September 30 – George Butt, English chaplain and poet (b. 1741)

=== October–December ===
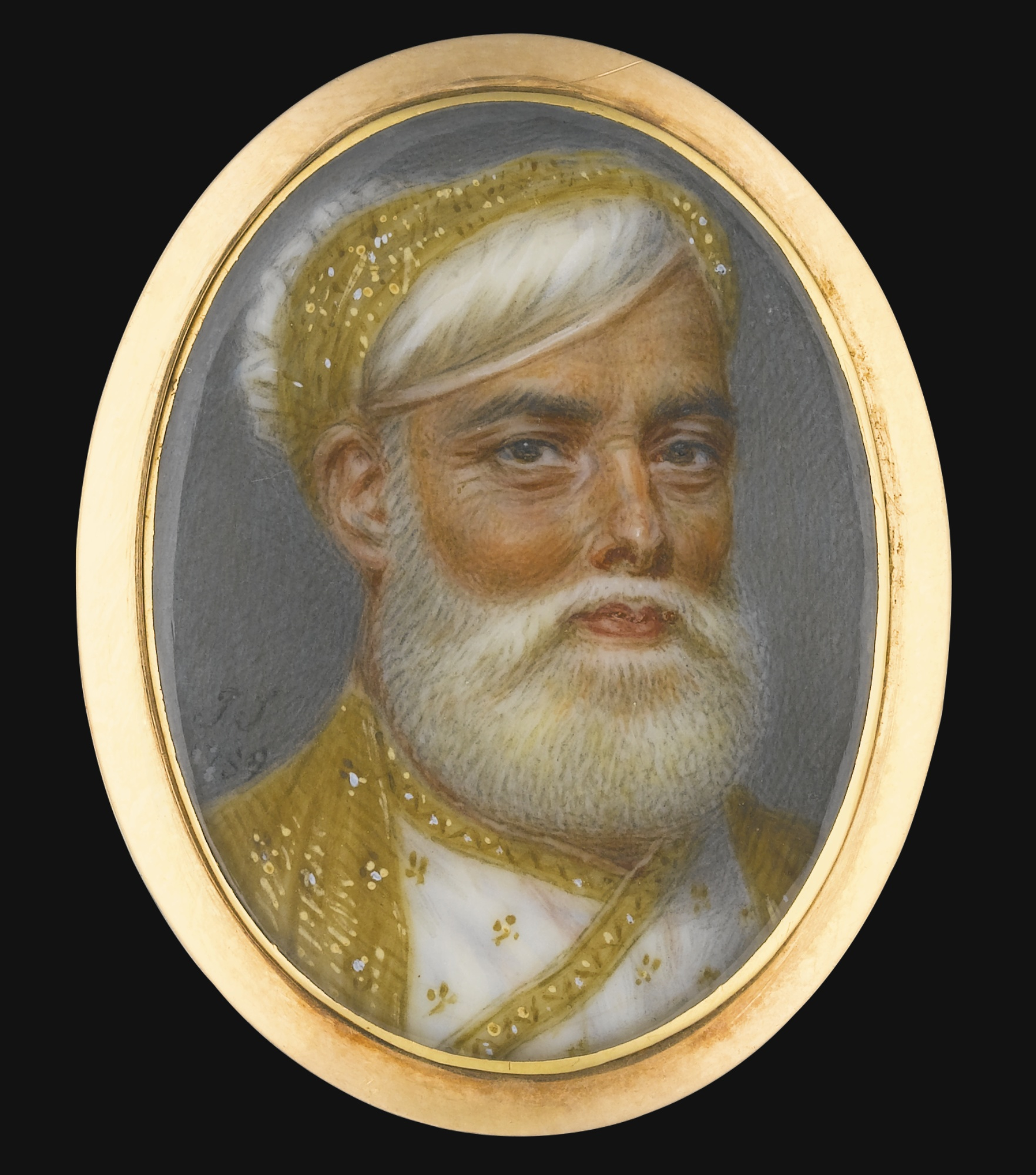
Muhammad Ali Khan Wallajah

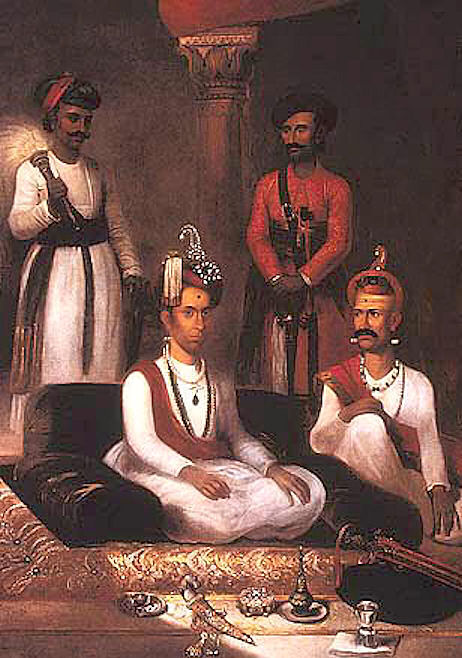
Madhavrao II

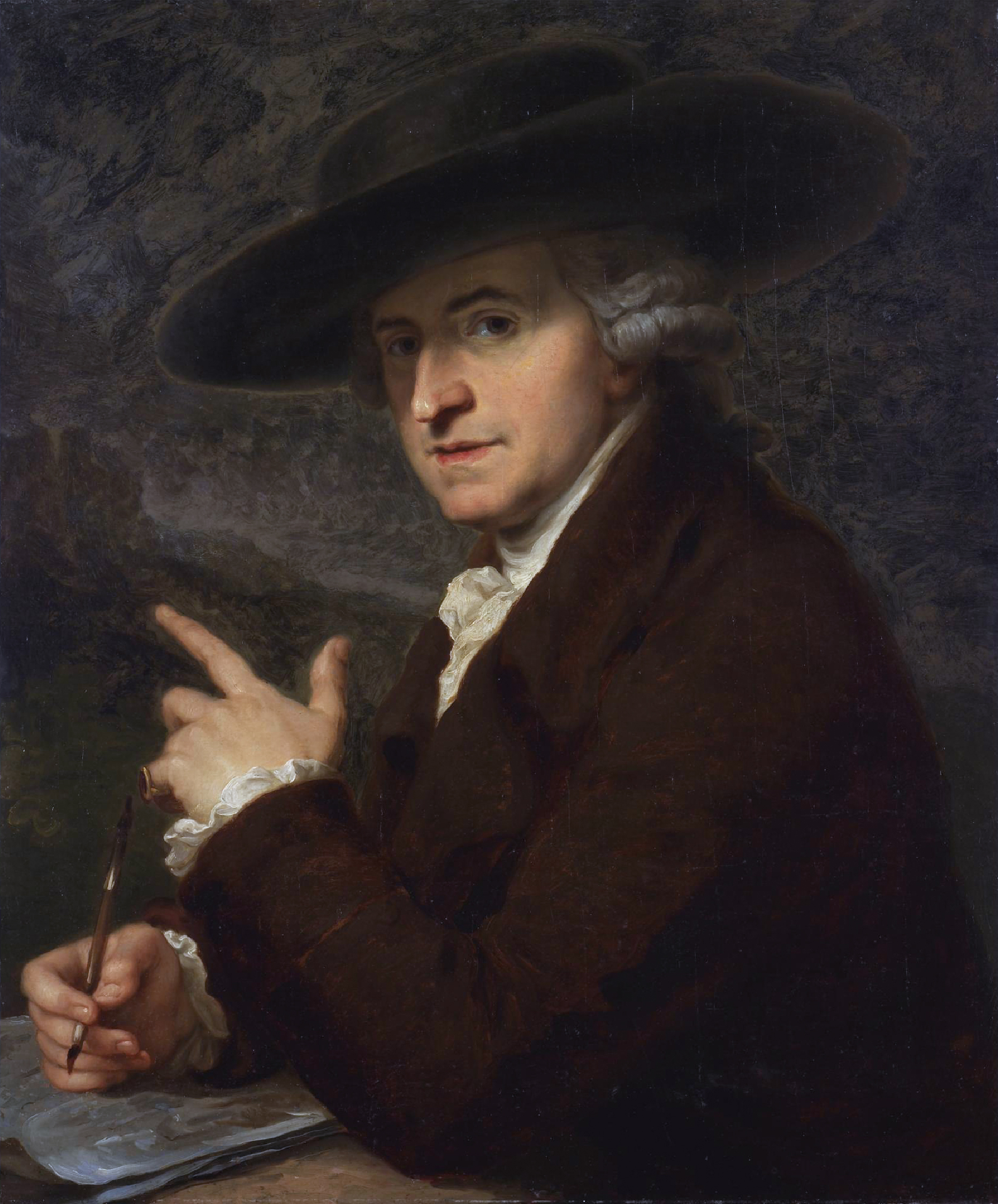
Antonio Zucchi

- October 8 – Andrew Kippis, English nonconformist clergyman and biographer (b. 1725)
- October 10
  - Samuel Fraunces, American restaurateur (b. 1722)
  - Francesco Antonio Zaccaria, Italian theologian and historian (b. 1714)
- October 13
  - William Prescott, American colonel during the Revolutionary War (b. 1726)
  - Muhammad Ali Khan Wallajah, Nawab of Arcot in India (b. 1717)
- October 27 – Madhavrao II, Peshwa of the Maratha Empire in India (b. 1774)
- November 3 – Sir John Hotham, 9th Baronet, English clergyman (b. 1734)
- November 6 – Jiří Antonín Benda, Bohemian composer (b. 1722)
- November 11 – George Dixon, British Royal Navy officer (b. 1748)
- November 15 – Charles-Amédée-Philippe van Loo, French painter (b. 1719)
- November 17 – Samuel Bishop, English poet (b. 1731)
- November 18
  - Antonio Cavallucci, Italian painter (b. 1752)
  - Jan August Cichocki, Polish general (b. 1750)
- December 4 – Prince Eugene of Saxe-Hildburghausen (b. 1730)
- December 10 – John Johnstone, Scottish nabob with the East India Company (b. 1734)
- December 23 – Henry Clinton, British general (b. 1730)
- December 26 – Antonio Zucchi, Italian painter (b. 1726)
- December 28 – Eugenio Espejo, Ecuadorian scientist (b. 1747)
