= Jonathan Buck =

Jonathan Buck is the name of:

- Jonathan Buck (Bucksport) (1719–1795), founder of Bucksport, Maine, US
- Jon B. (Jonathan David Buck, born 1975/76), American R&B singer
