= Henri Bourde de La Rogerie =

French archivist and historian

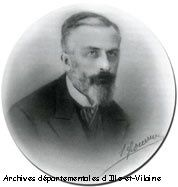
Henri Bourde de La Rogerie

Henri Bourde de La Rogerie (8 April 1873, Ernée – 31 January 1949, Rennes) was a French archivist and historian of Brittany.

He studied at the college in Saint-Lô, then received his law degree from the University of Caen and his diploma as an archivist-paleographer at the École des Chartes (1895). During his career, he worked as an archivist in the departments of Finistère (1897–1912) and Ille-et-Vilaine (1912–34).

He served as president of the Société archéologique d'Ille-et-Vilaine and the Société d'histoire et d'archéologie de Bretagne.

== Selected works ==
- Correspondance de Guillaume Charrier, abbé de Sainte-Croix de Quimperlé (as editor, 1901) – Correspondence of Guillaume Charrier, abbot of Sainte-Croix de Quimperlé.
- Les Bretons dans la Louisiane française. Le Chevalier de Kerlérec, (1904) – The Bretons in French Louisiana; the Chevalier de Kerlérec.
- Notice sur un recueil de plans d'édifices construits par les architectes de la Compagnie de Jésus, 1607-1672, (1904) – About a collection of building plans constructed by architects of the Society of Jesus from 1607 to 1672.
- Les Voyageurs en Bretagne. Le Voyage de Mignot de Montigny en Bretagne en 1752 – Voyagers in Brittany; the voyage of Mignot de Montigny in Brittany in 1752.
- Les fondations de villes et de bourgs en Bretagne du XIe au XIIIe siècle, (1928) – Religious foundations in the towns of Brittany in the 17th and 18th centuries.
- Les Bretons aux Iles de France et de Bourbon, (1934) – Bretons in Mauritius and Réunion.
- Les Abbayes cisterciennes de Bretagne en 1600, (1936) – Cistercian abbeys of Brittany in 1600.

== See also ==
- List of archivists
