= Nathaniel Lawrence (British politician) =

MP for Colchester (c.1627 – 1714)

Nathaniel Lawrence (circa 1627 – 5 May 1714) was an English politician who served as MP for Colchester in 1685.

He was the son of Thomas Lawrence. By 1661, he had married Martha Greene and they had at least one son and two daughters.
