= Jean Philippe Goujon de Grondel =

French general

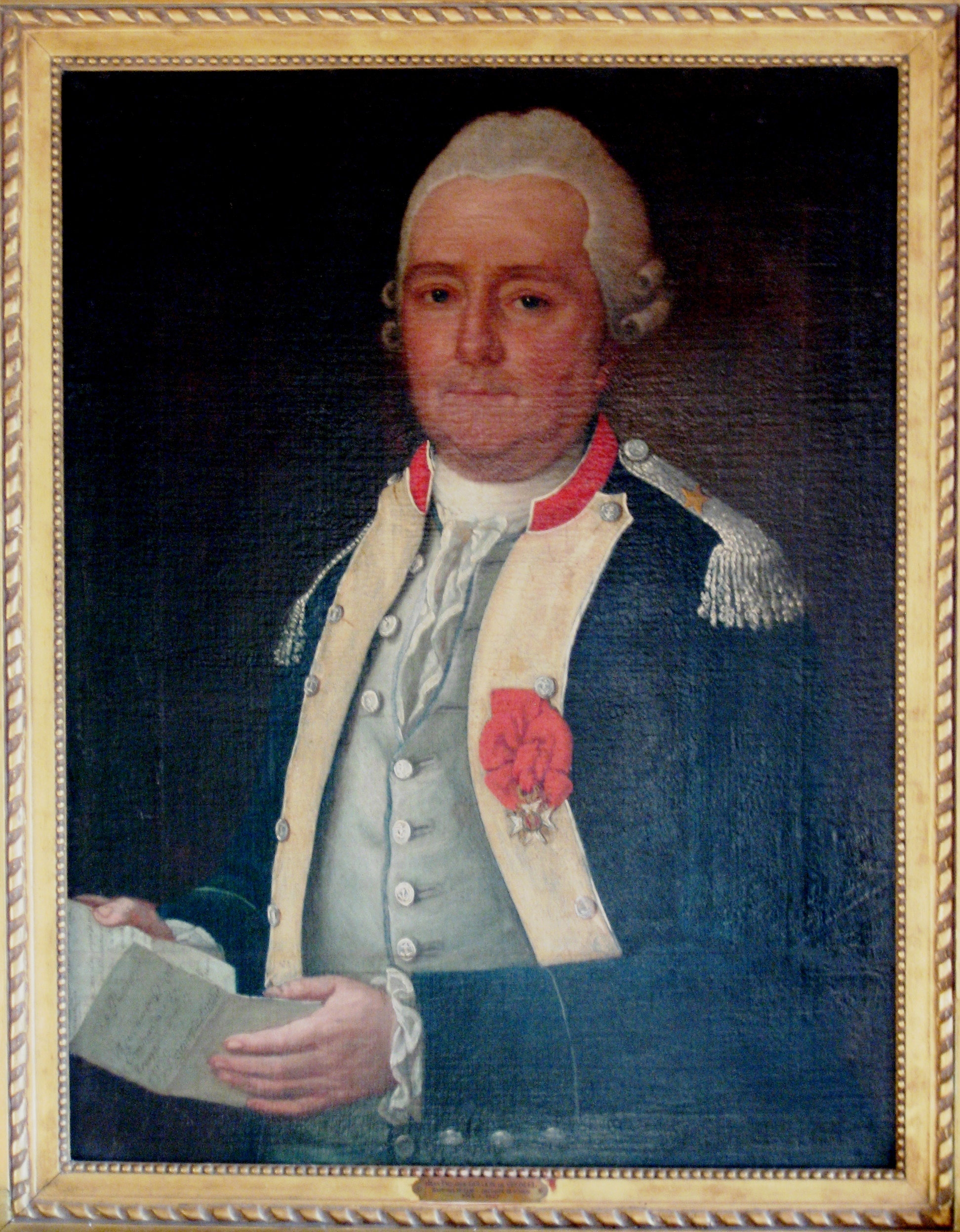
- Jean-Philippe Goujon de Grondel (1714–1807), maréchal de camp, knight of the Royal Order of Saint-Louis, holding the letter he wrote in 1765, when in the Bastille, to Monsieur de Sartine, Minister of the Interior of King Louis XV of France.
- Born: 27 November 1714; Saverne
- Died: 29 November 1807 (aged 93); Salins
- Father: Jean de Goujon

Jean Philippe Goujon de Grondel (27 November, 1714 in Saverne, Alsace – 29 November, 1807 in Salins, France) was a French general.

== Biography ==
Jean Philippe Goujon de Grondel was born 27 November 1714 in Saverne, the son of Jean de Goujon, a captain in the Alsace cavalry.

=== New Orleans ===
In 1731 Grondel was sent as a young officer to Louisiana, where he distinguished himself in the wars against the Chickasaws and was wounded in the battle of Ackia in 1736. After his marriage in 1741, he was employed in various military expeditions and diplomatic negotiations with Native American peoples, until 1750 when he became a captain of the Swiss grenadiers of Louisiana, and was awarded the Cross of St. Louis for his services in 1753. In 1758, he settled as a planter in New Orleans where he managed a plantation and 150 slaves.

=== Imprisonment ===
In 1759 Grondel was accused of insubordination by Governor Kerlerec and imprisoned for three years. In 1762 he was sent back to France to be prosecuted for insurrection. After a perilous return to France, Grondel was put under the protection by associates. On 9 April 1765 Grondel was put under arrest, and sent to the Bastille. He was released after a few days.

=== Return to command ===
Judgment in his trial was finally rendered in 1769, in his favor. Soon after, he was appointed lieutenant-colonel. Louisiana having been ceded to Spain, Grondel was appointed in 1772 to the command of the naval base at Lorient, and rose to the rank of brigadier-general in 1788. On 9 March 1788, when he was appointed field marshal, he retired from the military with a pension.

In 1792, during the French Revolution, he was denounced as an aristocrat and thrown into prison, but once again for just a few days. Almost immediately upon his release he was elected by the inhabitants of Nemours as commanding general of the National Guards of their city, serving until the following year. Grondel commanded the National Guard of Nemours from 1792 to 1793.

=== Later years and death ===
In 1796, he moved to Salins, near Montereau-Fault-Yonne, and died in 1807 at the age of 93.
