= Michael Lally (brigadier-general) =

Michael Lally (1 July 1714 – 1773) was an Irish soldier.

Lally was a member of the senior line of the Ó Maolalaidh of Máenmag but who had been resident at Tullaghnadaly, Tuam, since the 15th century.

He was a descendant of Seán Ó Maolalaidh (fl. 1419–1480), Chief of the Name, and was a cousin to Thomas Arthur, comte de Lally, baron de Tollendal (1702–1766). His parents were Michael Lally and Helen O'Carroll, he was born in Glasgow, Scotland.

On emigrating to France, Lally joined Dillon's regiment. In 1745, after ten years service, he was made captain in the regiment named after his uncle, Gerard Lally. He fought at the Battle of Fontenoy, after which he was promoted to colonel, and later again to that of brigadier-general. He was the constant companion of Count Lally during the many vicissitudes of a strenuous campaign in India. He returned in 1762 and died at Rouen in 1773.
