= 1734 =

1734 in various calendars
- Gregorian calendar: 1734; MDCCXXXIV
- Ab urbe condita: 2487
- Armenian calendar: 1183; ԹՎ ՌՃՁԳ
- Assyrian calendar: 6484
- Balinese saka calendar: 1655–1656
- Bengali calendar: 1140–1141
- Berber calendar: 2684
- British Regnal year: 7 Geo. 2 – 8 Geo. 2
- Buddhist calendar: 2278
- Burmese calendar: 1096
- Byzantine calendar: 7242–7243
- Chinese calendar: 癸丑年 (Water Ox); 4431 or 4224 — to — 甲寅年 (Wood Tiger); 4432 or 4225
- Coptic calendar: 1450–1451
- Discordian calendar: 2900
- Ethiopian calendar: 1726–1727
- Hebrew calendar: 5494–5495
- Hindu calendars
- Vikram Samvat: 1790–1791
- Shaka Samvat: 1655–1656
- Kali Yuga: 4834–4835
- Holocene calendar: 11734
- Igbo calendar: 734–735
- Iranian calendar: 1112–1113
- Islamic calendar: 1146–1147
- Japanese calendar: Kyōhō 19 (享保１９年)
- Javanese calendar: 1658–1659
- Julian calendar: Gregorian minus 11 days
- Korean calendar: 4067
- Minguo calendar: 178 before ROC 民前178年
- Nanakshahi calendar: 266
- Thai solar calendar: 2276–2277
- Tibetan calendar: ཆུ་མོ་གླང་ལོ་ (female Water-Ox); 1860 or 1479 or 707 — to — ཤིང་ཕོ་སྟག་ལོ་ (male Wood-Tiger); 1861 or 1480 or 708

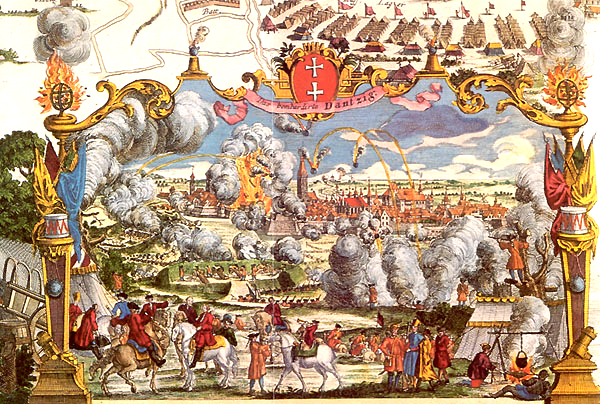
June 30: Russian troops take Danzig.

1734 (MDCCXXXIV) was a common year starting on Friday of the Gregorian calendar and a common year starting on Tuesday of the Julian calendar, the 1734th year of the Common Era (CE) and Anno Domini (AD) designations, the 734th year of the 2nd millennium, the 34th year of the 18th century, and the 5th year of the 1730s decade. As of the start of 1734, the Gregorian calendar was 11 days ahead of the Julian calendar, which remained in localized use until 1923.

== Events ==
=== January– March ===
- January 8 – Salzburgers, Lutherans who were expelled by the Roman Catholic Bishop of Salzburg, Austria, in October 1731, set sail for the British Colony of Georgia in America.
- February 16 – The Ostend Company, established in 1722 in the Austrian Netherlands (modern-day Belgium) to compete for trade in the West Indies (the Caribbean islands) and the East Indies (south and southeast Asia), ceases business as part of the agreement by Austria in the Second Treaty of Vienna.
- March 12 – Salzburgers arrive at the mouth of the Savannah River in the British Colony of Georgia.

=== April–June ===
- April 25 – Easter occurs on the latest possible date (the next time is in 1886).
- May 15 – Prince Charles of Spain (later King Charles III) becomes the new King of Naples and Sicily, five days after his arrival in Naples.
- May 25 – Spanish forces under the command of José Carrillo de Albornoz, 1st Duke of Montemar, defeat the Austrian forces, completing the conquest of the Kingdom of Naples at the Battle of Bitonto.
- May 27 – French and Swiss troops suppress the slave insurrection in the Danish West Indies on the island of Saint John (part of the modern-day U.S. Virgin Islands) after six months and restore control of the plantations to the Danish owners.
- June 6 – With the conclusion of the British general election (voting having begun in some constituencies on April 22), the Whigs, led by Prime Minister Robert Walpole, lose 85 seats but retain their majority.
- June 21 – In Montreal, New France, a black slave known by the French name of Marie-Joseph Angélique is tortured then hanged by the French authorities for allegedly setting a fire that destroyed part of the city.
- June 30 – War of the Polish Succession: Russian troops take Gdańsk (German: Danzig), which had been besieged since February 1734, after the failure of a French expedition to relieve the city.

=== July–September ===
- July 17 – French troops take Philippsburg, but the Duke of Berwick is killed.
- July 18 – War of the Polish Succession: The Siege of Philippsburg (an Austrian fortress near Karlsruhe, Germany) by the French Army ends after eight weeks as its Austrian defenders surrender.
- August 6 – The armies of Spain and France, led by the Duke of Parma (and future King Charles III of Spain) storm the city of Gaeta in Naples, ending a four-month siege (War of the Polish Succession).
- September 28 – Abdu'llah bin Ismail as-Samin is deposed after a 15-year reign as Sultan of Morocco.

=== October–December ===
- October 23 – Jamaica's Governor John Ayscough declares martial law to fight the slave rebellion that began in 1733, then drafts 600 men into the colonial army to march into the Blue Mountains. (→ First Maroon War)
- October 31 – Chief Tomochichi of the Yamacraw band of the Muscogee Nation ends a successful four and a half month visit to Great Britain, along with Georgia Governor James Oglethorpe and other Yamacraw Indians, after having signed the cession of the area of modern day Savannah, Georgia to the Georgia Company. On June 16, he and the Muscogee delegation (Senauki, Toonahowi, Hillispilli, Umpichi, Apokutchi, Santachi and Stimaletchi) had been welcomed as guests of King George II. The group departs on HMS Aldborough after completing the visit by the largest delegation of Native Americans since 1616.
- November 5 – The Dzików Confederation is created in Poland.
- December 24 – A fire destroys the Royal Alcázar of Madrid, the residence of the Spanish royal family, along with more than 400 valuable paintings, 100 sculptures and thousands of documents.

=== Undated ===
- Creation of the Kanem–Bornu Empire after Kanem is taken over by the Sultan of Bornu.
- Anton Wilhelm Amo becomes the first African to receive a doctorate in Europe and begins teaching at the University of Halle.

== Births ==
- January 16 – John A. Treutlen, Governor of Georgia (d. 1782)
- January 20 – Robert Morris, Founding Father of the United States (d. 1806)
- February 15 – William Stacy, American Revolutionary War officer (d. 1802)
- February 27 – Thomas Conway, American Revolutionary War general (d. 1800)
- March 1 – Jeanne de Bellem, heroine of the Brabant Revolution
- March 19 – Thomas McKean, American lawyer, signer of the Declaration of Independence (d. 1817)
- April 17 – Taksin, King of Thailand (d. 1782)
- April – Elsa Beata Bunge, Swedish botanist (d. 1819)
- May 23 – Franz Mesmer, Austrian physician (d. 1815)
- July 25 – Ueda Akinari, Japanese author and scholar (d. 1809)
- August 10 – Naungdawgyi, Burmese king (d. 1763)
- August 24 – Benjamin Church, first Surgeon General of the United States Army (d. 1763)
- September 3 – Joseph Wright, British painter (d. 1797)
- September 17 – Elizabeth Canning, English maidservant and kidnappee (d. 1773)
- October 7 – Sir Ralph Abercromby, British general (d. 1801)

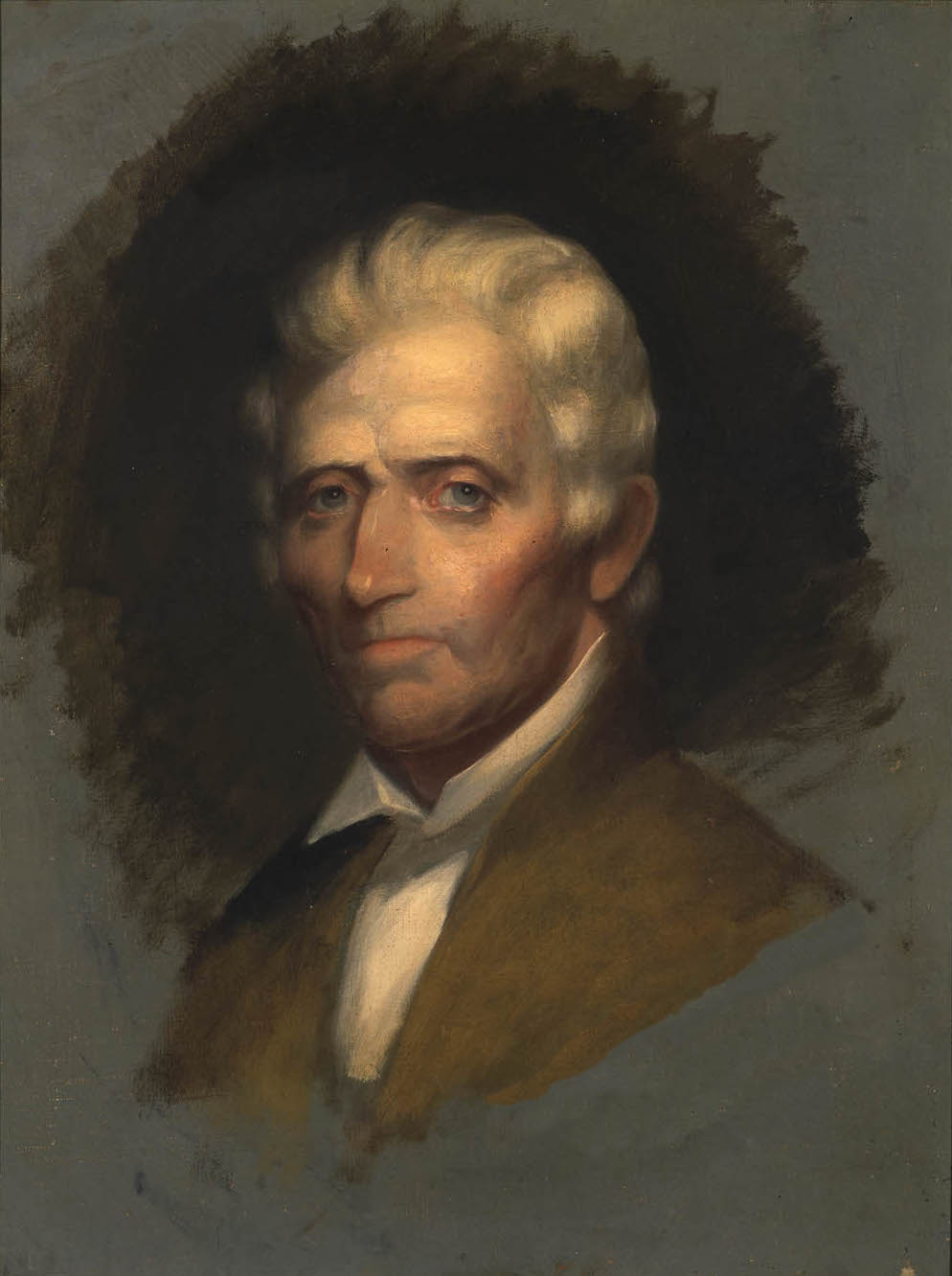
Daniel Boone

- November 2 – Daniel Boone, American frontiersman (d. 1820)
- December 1 – Adam Kazimierz Czartoryski, Polish aristocrat and patron of the arts (d. 1823)
- December 17 – Queen Maria I of Portugal (d. 1816)
- December 21 – Paul Revere, American silversmith, engraver, and Patriot in the American Revolution (d. 1818)
- December 26 – George Romney, English painter (d. 1802)
- December 31 – Francisco Manoel de Nascimento, Portuguese poet (d. 1819)
- date unknown
  - Catharina Ahlgren, Swedish poet, editor and early feminist (d.1800)
  - Ulrica Arfvidsson, Swedish fortune teller (d. 1801)
  - Elżbieta Branicka, Polish szlachta and politician (d. 1800)
  - John Dawson, English mathematician and surgeon (d.1820)
  - Pedro Fages, Spanish soldier, explorer, and Governor of Alta California (d. 1794)
  - Rohal Faqir, Pakistani saint-poet and mystic (d.1804)

== Deaths ==
- January 6 – John Dennis, English dramatist, critic (b. 1658)
- February 1 – John Floyer, English physician, writer (b. 1649)
- February 2 – Charles Calvert, Maryland official (b. 1688)
- February 9 – Diego de Astorga y Céspedes, Spanish Catholic cardinal (b. 1663)
- March 1 – Roger North, English biographer (b. 1653)
- March 16 – Andreas Silbermann, German organ builder (b. 1678)
- March 21 – Robert Wodrow, Scottish historian (b. 1679)
- April 1 – Louis Lully, French composer (b. 1664)
- April 11 – Thomas Fantet de Lagny, French mathematician (b. 1660)
- April 25 – Johann Konrad Dippel, German alchemist (b. 1673)
- May 4 – James Thornhill, English painter (b. 1675 or 1676)
- May 15 – Sebastiano Ricci, Italian painter (b. 1659)
- May 21 – Philippine Élisabeth d'Orléans, French princess (b. 1714)
- May 24 – Georg Ernst Stahl, German physician and chemist (b. 1660)

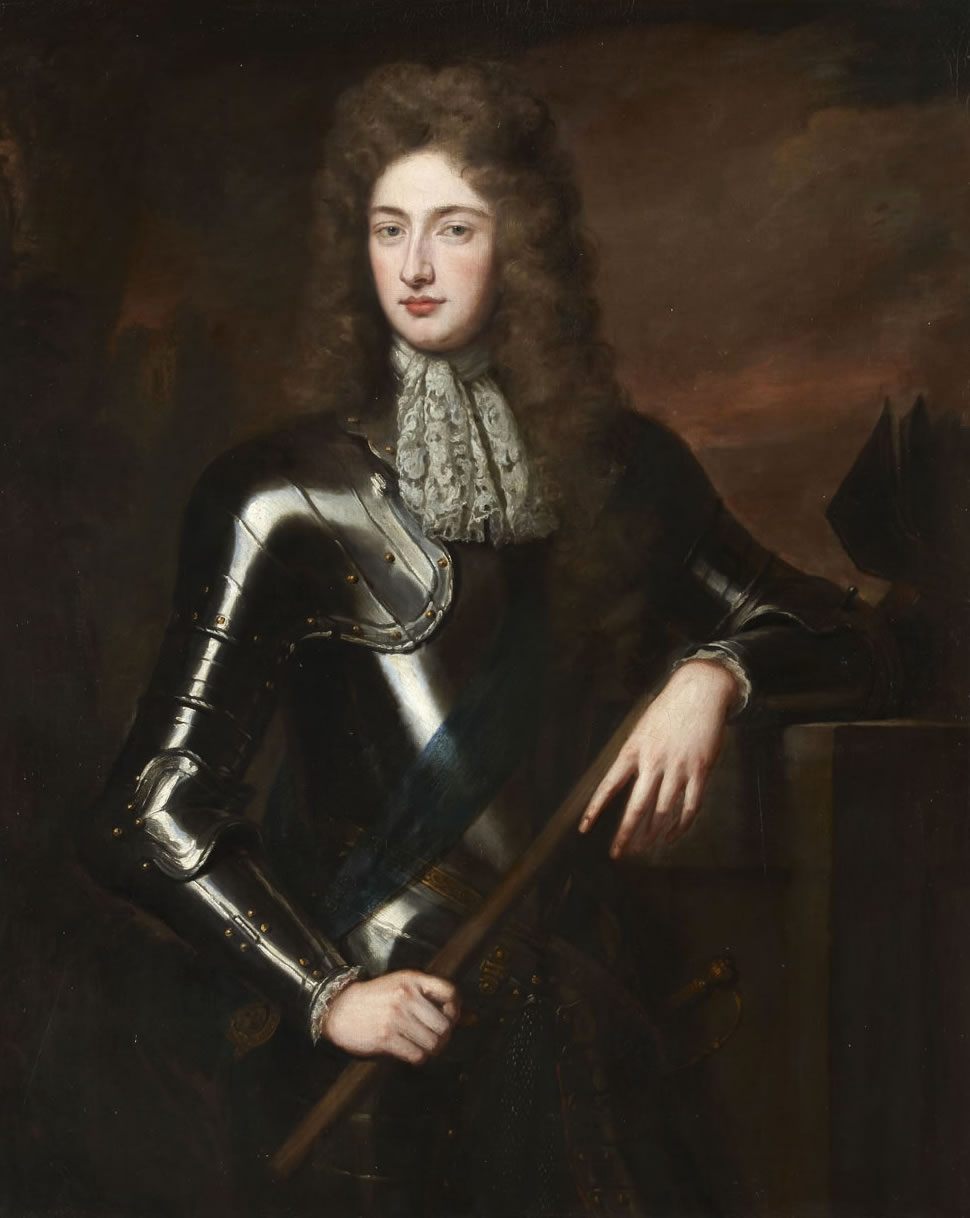
James FitzJames, 1st Duke of Berwick

- June 12 – James FitzJames, 1st Duke of Berwick, illegitimate son of James II of England and French military commander (b. 1670)
- June 15 – Giovanni Ceva, Italian mathematician (b. 1647)
- June 17 – Claude Louis Hector de Villars, Marshal of France (b. 1653)
- June 21 – Marie-Joseph Angélique, African slave
- July 22 – Peter King, 1st Baron King, Lord Chancellor of England (b. c. 1669)
- September 8 – Michel Sarrazin, Canadian scientist (b. 1659)
- October 12 – Simon Henry Adolph, Count of Lippe-Detmold, ruler of the county of Lippe (b. 1694)
- November 14 – Louise de Kérouaille, Duchess of Portsmouth, French-born mistress of Charles II of England (b. 1649)
- November 21 – Alexis Simon Belle, French portrait painter (b. 1674)
- November 23 – Eugene Jean, Count of Soissons, Prince of Savoy (b. 1714)
- December 5 – Peter Tillemans, Flemish painter (b. c. 1684)
- December 8 – James Figg, English prizefighter
- December 28 – Rob Roy MacGregor, Scottish clan chief (b. 1671)
- date unknown
  - Richard Cantillon, Irish-French economist and author
  - Étienne de Veniard, Sieur de Bourgmont, French explorer (b. 1679)
