= Étienne Mignot de Montigny =

French engineer and geographer

Étienne Mignot de Montigny (French: [etjɛn miɲo də mɔ̃tiɲi]; 15 December 1714, in Paris – 6 May 1782) was a French engineer and geographer.

He studied the textile industries in England, Switzerland, and France in the 1730s. He was then appointed a commissioner in the Ministry of Commerce. He was responsible for making improvements to industry and commerce through the application of new inventions and machinery. From 1758 to 1782 he was a member of the Académie Royale des Sciences. He was also an associate of the Prussian Academy of Sciences.

With César-François Cassini de Thury and Charles Étienne Louis Camus, he published the Carte de la France.

== Associated works ==
- Instruction et avis aux habitans des provinces méridionales de la France, sur la maladie putride et pestilentielle qui détruit le bétail, 1775 – Training and advice to the inhabitants of the southern provinces of France concerning the putrid and pestilential disease that destroys livestock.
- Méthode d’apprêter les cuirs et les peaux, telle qu’on la pratique à la Louisiane, 1780 – Method of preparing hides and skins, as practiced in Louisiana.
- Les voyageurs en Bretagne : voyage de Mignot de Montigny de l'Académie des Sciences en Bretagne, en 1752 (edition by Henri Bourde de La Rogerie, 1926) – The voyagers of Brittany; voyage of Mignot de Montigny in Brittany in 1752.
