= Samuel Bishop =

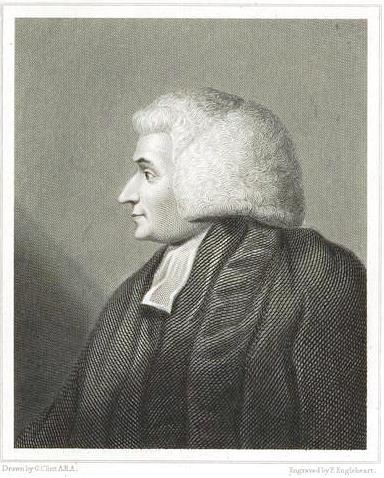
An engraving of Samuel Bishop after a drawing by George Clint

Samuel Bishop (21 September 1731 – 17 November 1795) was an English poet, clergyman and teacher, born in London and educated at Merchant Taylors' School and St John's College, Oxford. Having taken holy orders, he entered his old school as a master in 1758, rising to become headmaster in 1783. After his death, his occasional poems were collected and published in 1796, with a memoir by Rev. Thomas Clare, and his sermons in 1798.
