= Jonathan Buck (Bucksport) =

American town founder

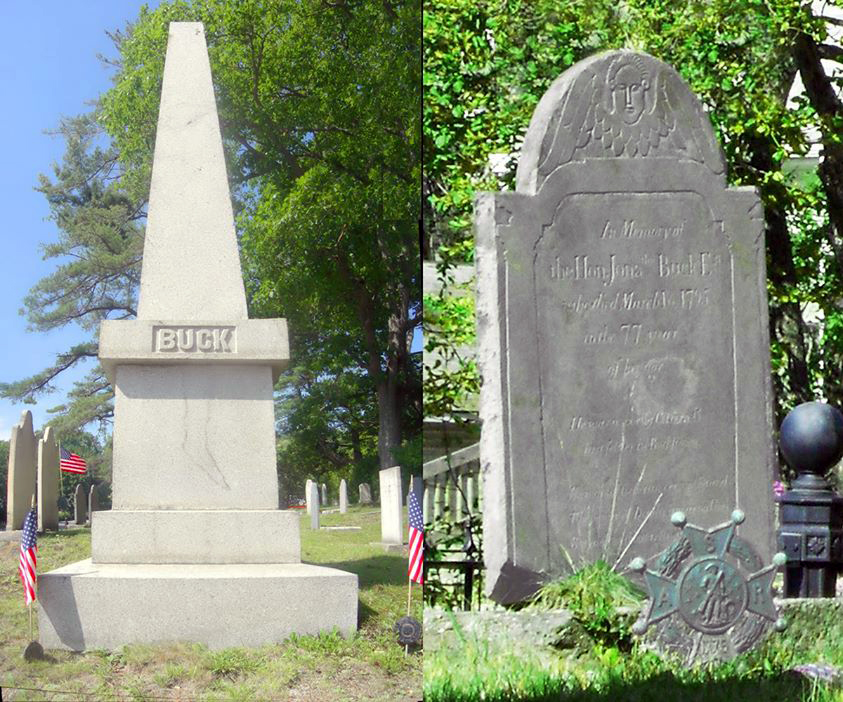
The two grave markers for Col. Jonathan Buck

Jonathan Buck (February 20, 1719 – March 18, 1795) was the founder of the town of Bucksport, Maine, United States, having settled what was known as Plantation 1, building the first sawmill and opening the first general store.

Colonel Buck was a justice of the peace and is the subject of a legend that holds that he ordered a witch put to death by burning, and this witch put a curse on his tomb. There is a monument to Col. Buck erected in the Bucksport Cemetery in 1870 which bears a stain roughly in the shape of a woman's lower leg. According to the legend, the stain is the leg and foot of the witch, and that the mark has reappeared whenever the tombstone has been replaced.

Buck left Haverhill when his request to build a shipyard on the Merrimack River was denied and instead he was offered privileges on a tributary on another side of his land. Since Buck did not own the land on the opposite side of the brook, he saw no ability to thrive as a shipbuilder in Haverhill.

In 1775 Buck was appointed by the Massachusetts Provincial Congress as Colonel in the 5th Regiment of the District of Maine Militia in Lincoln County and placed in charge of Fort Pownall located at the mouth of the Penobscot River. He was one of the leaders of the Penobscot Expedition in July–August, 1779, a major loss for the colonial forces. After this, Buck trekked back to Haverhill to be with his sons, and did not return to Maine until 1783.
