= Louis-Georges de Bréquigny =

French scholar (1714–1795)

Louis-Georges-Oudard-Feudrix de Bréquigny (22 February 1714 – 3 July 1795), was a French scholar. He was born in Granville in Normandy.

His first publications were anonymous: a History of the Revolutions of Genoa up to the Peace of 1748 (Histoire des revolutions de Gênes jusqu'à la paix de 1748; 1750), and a series of Lives of the Greek Orators (Vies des orateurs grecs; 1752). In 1754 he was given the task of completing the work of Eusèbe de Laurière, later continued by Denis-François Secousse, on the Ordonnances des Rois de France de la 3e Race. Secousse had published nine volumes and Bréquigny published five more up to 1790. In 1811, Emmanuel de Pastoret published the last eleven volumes. Elected a member of the Académie des Inscriptions et Belles-Lettres in 1759, he contributed a History of Postumus, Emperor of the Gauls (Histoire de Posthume empereur des Gaules; vol. XXX, 1760) to the collected works of that illustrious society, and also a Dissertation on the Establishment of the Religion and Empire of Muhammad (Mémoire sur l'établissement de la religion et de l'empire de Mahomet; vol. XXXII, 1761–1763).

After the close of the Seven Years' War he was sent to search in the archives of Great Britain for documents bearing upon the history of France, more particularly upon that of the French provinces which once belonged to England. This mission (1764–1766) was very fruitful in results: Bréquigny brought back from it copies of about 7000 documents, which are now in the Bibliothèque Nationale. A useful selection of these documents was published (unfortunately without adequate critical treatment) by Jacques Joseph Champollion-Figeac, under the title Letters of Kings, Queens and Other Persons of the Courts of France and England, from Louis VII to Henry IV (Lettres de rois, reines et autres personages des cours de France et d'Angleterre, depuis Louis VII. jusqu'à Henri IV.) (collection of Unpublished Documents Relating to the History of France (Documents inédits relatifs a l'histoire de France), 2 vols., 1839, 1847).

Bréquigny himself drew the material for many important studies from the rich mine which he had thus exploited. These were included in the collection of the Académie des Inscriptions:

- Dissertation on the Differences between France and England during the Reign of Charles the Fair (Mémoire sur les differends entre la France et Angleterre sous le règne de Charles le Bel; vol. XLI)
- Dissertation on the Life of Mary, Queen of France, Sister of Henry VIII, King of England (Mémoire sur la vie de Marie, reine de France, sœur de Henri VIII., roi d'Angleterre; vol. XLII)
- four Dissertations to Serve the History of the Town of Calais (Mémoires pour servir à l'histoire de la ville de Calais; vols. XLIII and L)
- Dissertation on the Negotiations Concerning the Marriage Plans of Elizabeth, Queen of England, First with the Duke of Anjou, Then with the Duke of Alençon, Both Brothers of King Charles IX of France (Mémoire sur les négociations touchant les projets de mariage d'Elisabeth, reine d'Angleterre, d'abord avec le duc d'Anjou, ensuite avec le duc d'Alençon, tous deux frères de Charles IX, roi de France; vol. I)

This last was read to the Academy on 22 January 1793, the day after Louis XVI's execution. Meanwhile, Bréquigny had taken part in three celebrated works.

To the Chronological Table of Diplomas, Charters, Letters, and Printed Acts Concerning the History of France (Table chronologique des diplômes, chartes, lettres, et actes imprimés concernant l'histoire de France) he contributed three volumes in collaboration with Mouchet (1769–1783). Charged with the supervision of a large collection of documents bearing on French history, analogous to Thomas Rymer's Foedera, he published the first volume (Diplomas, Charters, Letters, and Other Documents Relating to French Affairs, etc., in Latin: Diplomata, chartae, epistolae, et alia documenta, ad res Francicas spectantia, etc., 1791). The Revolution interrupted him in his collection of Dissertations Concerning the History, Sciences, Letters, and Arts of the Chinese Mémoires concernant l'histoire, les sciences, les lettres, et les arts des Chinois, begun in 1776 at the instance of the minister Bertin, when fifteen volumes had appeared.

See the note on Bréquigny at the end of volume I of the Dissertations of the Académie des Inscriptions (Mémoires de l'Académie des Inscriptions; 1808); the introduction to volume IV of the Chronological Table of Diplomas (1836); Champollion-Figeac's preface to the Letters of Kings and Queens; the Committee of Historical Works (Comité des travaux historiques), by X. Charmes, vol. I passim; N. Oursel, New Norman Biography (Nouvelle biographie normande; 1886); and the Catalogue of Manuscripts of the Duchesne and Bréquigny Collections (Catalogue des manuscrits des collections Duchesne et Bréquigny; in the Bibliothèque Nationale), by René Poupardin (1905).
