= 1715 =

1715 in various calendars
- Gregorian calendar: 1715; MDCCXV
- Ab urbe condita: 2468
- Armenian calendar: 1164; ԹՎ ՌՃԿԴ
- Assyrian calendar: 6465
- Balinese saka calendar: 1636–1637
- Bengali calendar: 1121–1122
- Berber calendar: 2665
- British Regnal year: 1 Geo. 1 – 2 Geo. 1
- Buddhist calendar: 2259
- Burmese calendar: 1077
- Byzantine calendar: 7223–7224
- Chinese calendar: 甲午年 (Wood Horse); 4412 or 4205 — to — 乙未年 (Wood Goat); 4413 or 4206
- Coptic calendar: 1431–1432
- Discordian calendar: 2881
- Ethiopian calendar: 1707–1708
- Hebrew calendar: 5475–5476
- Hindu calendars
- Vikram Samvat: 1771–1772
- Shaka Samvat: 1636–1637
- Kali Yuga: 4815–4816
- Holocene calendar: 11715
- Igbo calendar: 715–716
- Iranian calendar: 1093–1094
- Islamic calendar: 1126–1128
- Japanese calendar: Shōtoku 5 (正徳５年)
- Javanese calendar: 1638–1639
- Julian calendar: Gregorian minus 11 days
- Korean calendar: 4048
- Minguo calendar: 197 before ROC 民前197年
- Nanakshahi calendar: 247
- Thai solar calendar: 2257–2258
- Tibetan calendar: ཤིང་ཕོ་རྟ་ལོ་ (male Wood-Horse); 1841 or 1460 or 688 — to — ཤིང་མོ་ལུག་ལོ་ (female Wood-Sheep); 1842 or 1461 or 689

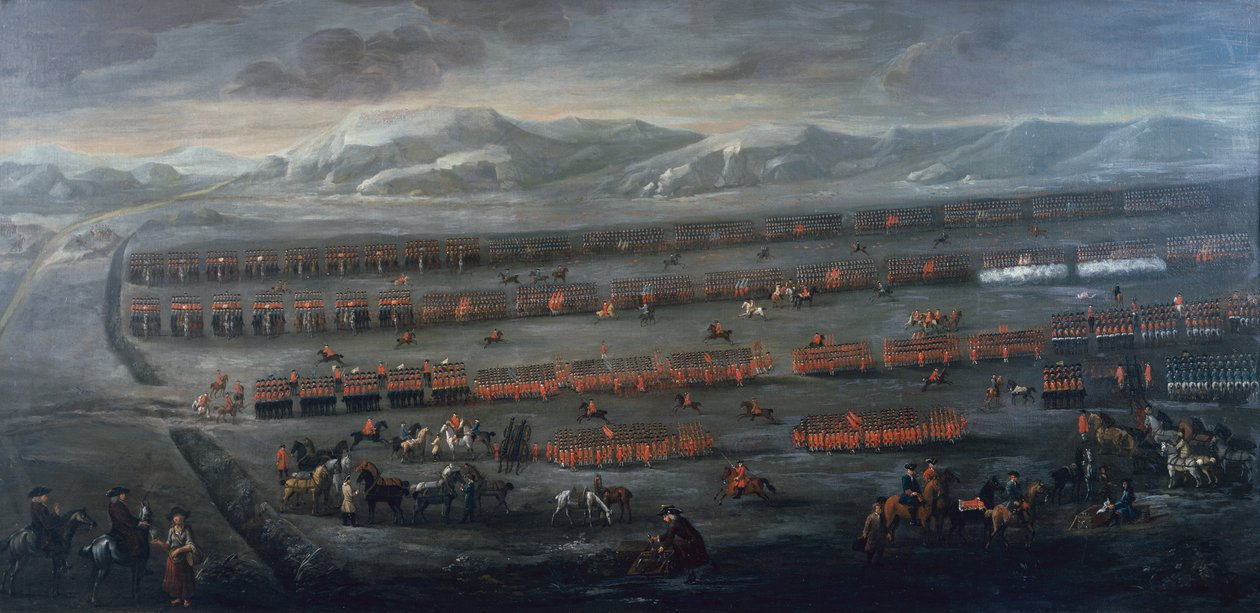
November 13: Battle of Sheriffmuir

1715 (MDCCXV) was a common year starting on Tuesday of the Gregorian calendar and a common year starting on Saturday of the Julian calendar, the 1715th year of the Common Era (CE) and Anno Domini (AD) designations, the 715th year of the 2nd millennium, the 15th year of the 18th century, and the 6th year of the 1710s decade. As of the start of 1715, the Gregorian calendar was 11 days ahead of the Julian calendar, which remained in localized use until 1923.

== Events ==
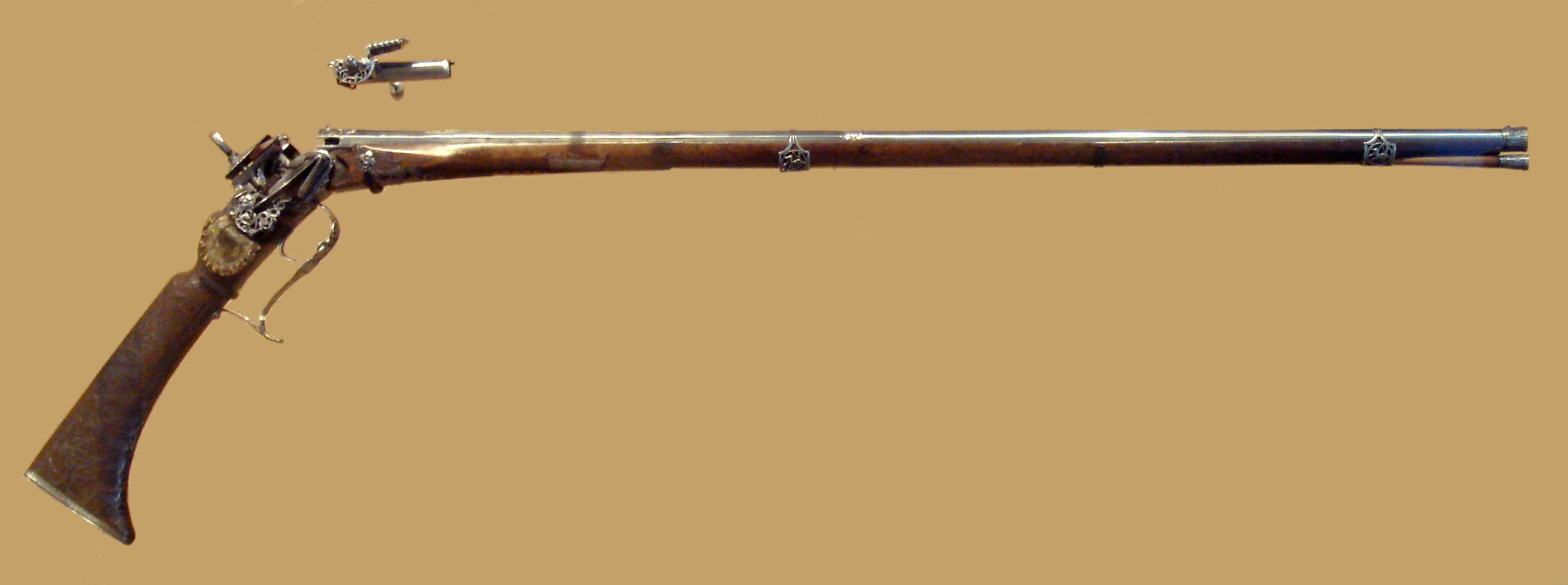
Breech-loading firearm that belonged to Philip V of Spain, made by A. Tienza, Madrid circa 1715.

For dates within Great Britain and the British Empire, as well as in the Russian Empire, the "old style" Julian calendar was used in 1715, and can be converted to the "new style" Gregorian calendar (adopted in the British Empire in 1752 and in Russia in 1923) by adding 11 days.

=== January–March ===
- January 13 – A fire in London, described by some as the worst since the Great Fire of London (1666) almost 50 years earlier, starts on Thames Street when fireworks prematurely explode "in the house of Mr. Walker, an oil man"; more than 100 houses are consumed in the blaze, which continues over to Tower Street before it is controlled.
- January 22 – Voting begins for the British House of Commons and continues for the next 46 days in different constituencies on different days.
- February 11 – Tuscarora War: The Tuscarora and their allies sign a peace treaty with the Province of North Carolina, and agree to move to a reservation near Lake Mattamuskeet, effectively ending the Tuscarora War. Large numbers of Tuscarora subsequently move to New York.
- March 9 – Voting for the British House of Commons concludes, with the liberal Whig Party winning 341 of the 558 seats, and reducing the conservative Tory Party share to 217 seats. Spencer Compton, the Earl of Wilmington, becomes the Speaker of the House of Commons.
- March 14 – James Stuart, the "Old Pretender" attempting to restore the House of Stuart to control of Great Britain as King James III of England and James VIII of Scotland, meets with Pope Clement XI for the assistance of the Roman Catholic Church in the Jacobite rising.
- March 27 – Henry St John, 1st Viscount Bolingbroke, flees from Great Britain to France. His part in secret negotiations with France, leading to the Treaty of Utrecht, has cast suspicion on him in the eyes of the Whig government of Britain. He becomes secretary of state to the Pretender, James Edward Stuart.

=== April–June ===
- April 1 – The Battle of Gurdas Nangal begins during the Mughal-Sikh Wars in India, as the Mughal Army begins an eight-month siege of a fortress near Gurdaspur (in what is now the Punjab state), where Sikh General Banda Singh Bahadur and 1,250 of his men have fled. The siege ends on December 7 when the 750 survivors, including Banda Singh, are captured. By June 1716, most of the Sikh prisoners have been tortured, killed and executed, with Banda Singh dying on June 9.
- April 15 – In the British colonial Province of South Carolina, the Yamasee Confederation launches an attack on English settlements in disputed territory on Good Friday, launching the two-year long Yamasee War. The day before, agents Thomas Nairne, William Bray and Samuel Warner had participated in peace negotiations with the Yamasee at Pocotaligo. Bray and Warner are killed that day, while Nairne is tortured to death and dies on April 17.
- April 24 – The Battle of Fehmarn takes place in the Baltic Sea as part of the Great Northern War. Ten warships of Denmark, under the command of Christian Gabel, overwhelm a force of Swedish Navy ships led by Carl Wachtmeister. By the time the battle ends the next day, five Swedish ships and 1,626 crewmen have been captured, and another 353 killed. The Danish navy suffers 65 deaths.
- May 3 – A total solar eclipse is seen across southern England, Sweden and Finland (the last total eclipse visible in London for almost 900 years). English astronomer Edmond Halley (who is using the old style Julian calendar date of April 22) records the first observation noted of the phenomenon of "Baily's beads", in which higher elevations on the moon can be observed obscuring portions of the light moments before and after totality.
- May 28 – Rioting begins in England on the birthday of King George I as supporters of the Old Pretender, James of the House of Stuart, begin mass protesting against the rule of the House of Hanover, near London in the towns of Smithfield and Highgate, and the Cheapside financial district in London.
- June 9 – King Philip, ruler of the Crown of Castile and the Crown of Aragon unifies the two monarchies into a single state, centralizing rule of a unified Kingdom of Spain.
- June 22 – Tsar Peter the Great of Russia witnesses the attempt of 45 Dutch and English ships to enter the small harbour at Saint Petersburg and decides that additional harbours are necessary for Russia to be able import Western goods.
- June 29 – Britain's Treason Act 1714 takes effect, providing for forfeiture to the British Crown of property owned by any person convicted of treason in the Kingdom. The Act remains in effect until June 24, 1718.

=== July–September ===
- July 20 – Ottoman–Venetian War (1714–18): The fall of Nauplion, the capital of the Venetian "Kingdom of the Morea", seals the fate of the Peloponnese Peninsula, which is soon completely retaken by the Ottomans.
- July 24 – 1715 Treasure Fleet: A Spanish treasure fleet of 12 ships, under General Don Juan Ubilla, leaves Havana, Cuba for Spain. Seven days later, 11 of them sink in a storm off the coast of Florida (some centuries later, treasure salvage is found from these wrecks).
- August 31 – Old Dock, Liverpool, England, the world's first enclosed commercial wet dock (Thomas Steers, engineer), opens.
- September 1 – King Louis XIV of France dies after a reign of 72 years, leaving his throne to his 5 year old great-grandson Louis XV. Philippe d'Orléans, the nephew of Louis XIV, serves as Regent.
- September 6 – The first major Jacobite rising in Scotland against the rule of King George I of Great Britain breaks out. The Earl of Mar raises the standard of James Edward Stuart, and marches on Edinburgh. James, the son of the deposed King James VII, arrives from France.
- September 14 – Less than two weeks after King Louis XIV's death, Daniel Voysin de la Noiraye, France's Secretary of State for War since 1709, steps down at the request of the new regent, the Duke of Orleans.

=== October–December ===
- October 2 – During the rebellion in Great Britain by supporters of the Pretender to the Throne, James Stuart, the Jacobites raid the Scottish parish of Burntisland, capture an arsenal of weapons, and begin an occupation of the area on October 9 in the name of Stuart as King James VIII of Scotland.
- October 11 – William Aislabie resigns as the British East India Company's administrator of Bombay and the company's territories and is replaced at year's end by Charles Boone.
- October 12
  - William Mackintosh of Borlum, leader of the Jacobite rising against Great Britain, lands with 1,500 men in Scotland after crossing the Firth of Forth from France.
  - Baron Onslow resigns as Great Britain's Chancellor of the Exchequer and is replaced by future Prime Minister Robert Walpole.
- October 28 – The Treaty of Greifswald is signed between Russia and the Electorate of Hanover, with George I of Great Britain and Hanover agreeing to Russia's annexation of Swedish Ingria and Estonia, and Hanover claiming the Bremen-Verden Swedish duchies of Bremen and Verden.
- November 13 – Jacobite rising in Scotland – Battle of Sheriffmuir: The forces of the Kingdom of Great Britain, led by John Campbell, 2nd Duke of Argyll, halt the Jacobite advance, although the action is inconclusive.
- November 14 – Battle of Preston: Government forces defeat the Jacobite incursion, at the conclusion of a five-day siege and action.
- November 15 – The Third Barrier Treaty is signed by Britain, the Holy Roman Empire and the Dutch Republic.
- November 28 – The application of the Nueva Planta decrees, in Mallorca and the other Balearic Islands (formerly under the Crown of Aragon), bring them under the laws of the Crown of Castile.
- December 22 – James Edward Stuart rejoins Jacobite rebels in Scotland, but fails to rouse his army.

=== Date unknown ===
- Karlsruhe Palace is built, resulting in the town of Karlsruhe growing up around it.
- The ancient right to evaluate royal decrees publicly, before they are given the force of law by the Parlement of Paris, is restored.
- Filippo Juvarra starts working on the previously postponed construction of the church of Santa Christina in Turin.
- Filippo Juvarra starts rebuilding the church of San Filippo Neri, Turin, in which the roof had collapsed, during the siege of Turin, during the War of the Spanish Succession.
- Coffee is first grown in the French colony of Saint-Domingue.
- Around this year, a breech loading firearm is made for Philip V of Spain.

== Births ==
- January 9 – Robert-François Damiens, French domestic servant, executed for the attempted assassination of Louis XV (d. 1757)
- January 10
  - Christian August Crusius, German philosopher, Protestant theologian (d. 1775)
  - Johan Sparre af Söfdeborg, Swedish general, nobleman (d. 1791)
- January 12 – Jacques Duphly, French composer (d. 1789)
- January 23 – Jean-Olivier Briand, French-born Catholic bishop of Quebec (d. 1794)
- January 24 – Ōkubo Tadaoki, Japanese daimyō (d. 1764)
- January 25
  - George Hay, British politician (d. 1778)
  - Thomas Walker, distinguished Virginia physician, explorer (d. 1794)
- January 29 – Georg Christoph Wagenseil, Austrian composer (d. 1777)
- January 30 – Jean-Baptiste Lestiboudois, French botanist (d. 1804)
- January 31
  - Giovanni Fagnano, Italian mathematician (d. 1797)
  - John Wayles, American lawyer and planter (d. 1773)
- February 4 – John Hamilton, British politician (d. 1796)
- February 5 – Baltazar Adam Krčelić, Croatian historian and theologian (d. 1778)
- February 11 – Margaret Bentinck, Duchess of Portland, British duchess (d. 1785)
- February 12 – James Grenville, British Member of Parliament (d. 1783)

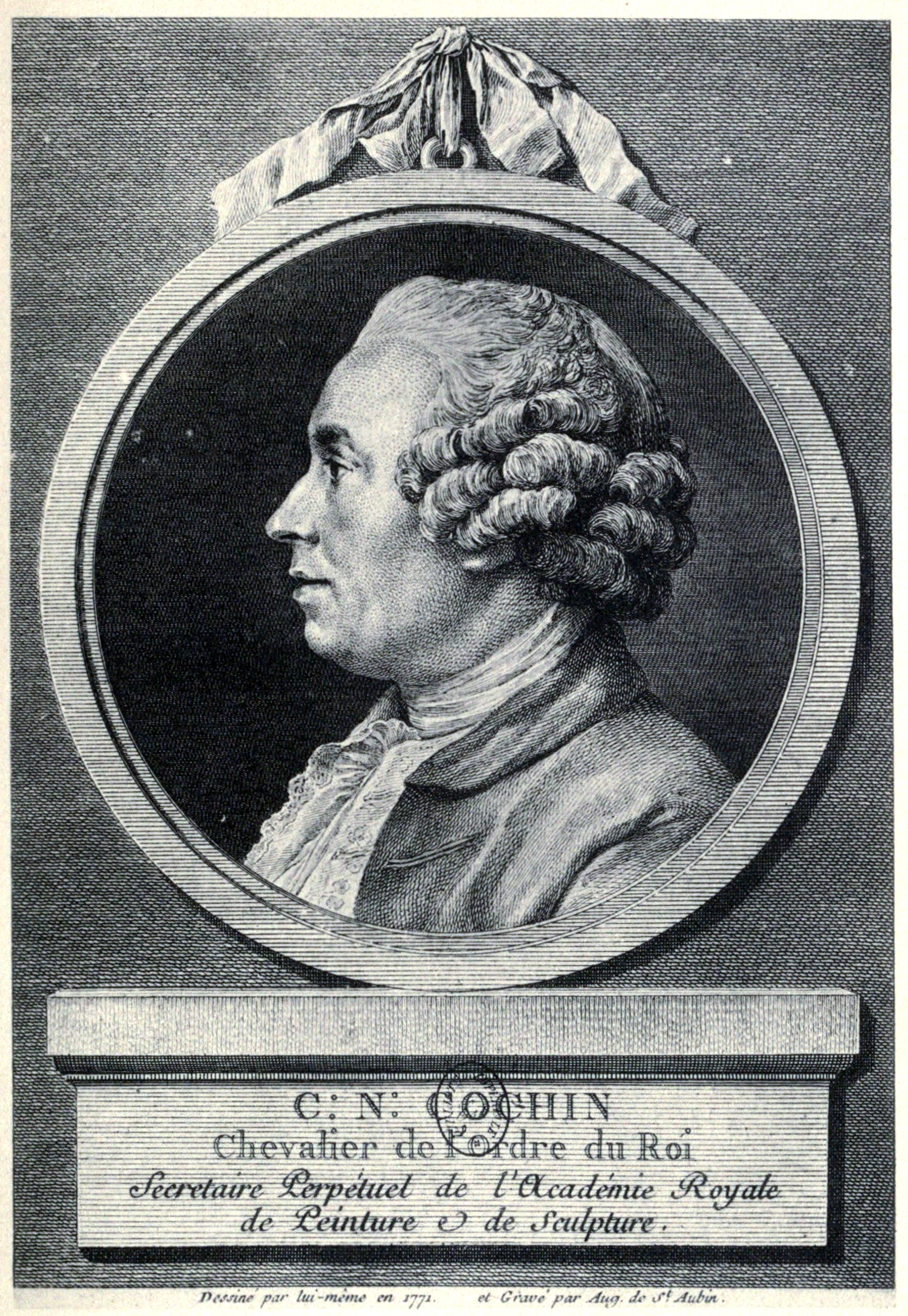
Charles-Nicolas Cochin

- February 22
  - Charles-Nicolas Cochin, French artist (d. 1790)
  - Jean Georges Lefranc de Pompignan, Roman Catholic archbishop (d. 1790)

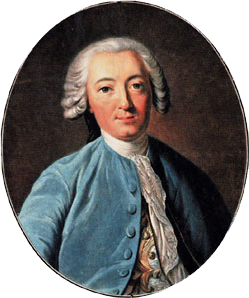
Claude Adrien Helvétius

- February 26 – Claude Adrien Helvétius, French philosopher (d. 1771)
- February 27 – Mateo Aimerich, Spanish philologist (d. 1799)
- March 4 – James Waldegrave, 2nd Earl Waldegrave of Great Britain (d. 1763)
- March 7
  - Ewald Christian von Kleist, German poet and officer (d. 1759)
  - Ephraim Williams, English benefactor of Williams College, soldier in the French and Indian War (d. 1755)
- March 14 – Johan Martin Preisler, German artist (d. 1794)
- March 18 – John Bushell, first (Massachusetts-born) Canadian printer (d. 1761)
- March 24 – William Strahan, British politician (d. 1785)
- March 25 – Mary Frances of the Five Wounds, Italian Franciscan saint (d. 1791)
- March 28 – Margrave Frederick William of Brandenburg-Schwedt, Prussian major general and titular Margrave of Brandenburg-Schwedt (d. 1744)
- March 31 – Johan Samuel Augustin, German-Danish astronomical writer, civil servant (d. 1785)
- April 3 – William Watson, English scientist (d. 1787)
- April 9 – Giovanni Carlo Boschi, Italian Catholic cardinal (d. 1788)
- April 11
  - John Alcock, English composer and organist (d. 1806)
  - Jacob Rodrigues Pereira, academic, first teacher of deaf-mutes in France (d. 1780)
- April 13 – John Martin Mack, American missionary (d. 1784)
- April 19 – James Nares, English composer of mostly sacred vocal works (d. 1783)
- April 20
  - James Brudenell, 5th Earl of Cardigan, English noble and politician (d. 1811)
  - Saliha Sultan, daughter of Ottoman Sultan (d. 1778)
- April 23
  - Johann Friedrich Doles, German composer (d. 1797)
  - John Hicks, Canadian politician (d. 1790)
  - Auguste de Keralio, French nobleman (d. 1805)
  - Carl Tersmeden, Swedish admiral (d. 1797)
- April 28
  - Carl Fredrik Scheffer, Swedish politician (d. 1786)
  - Franz Sparry, Austrian composer (d. 1767)
- May 4
  - Richard Graves, English minister (d. 1804)
  - Hieronim Florian Radziwiłł, Polish-Lithuanian noble (d. 1760)
- May 7 – Charles Roe, English businessman (d. 1781)
- May 11
  - Johann Gottfried Bernhard Bach, fourth child of Johann Sebastian Bach and Maria Barbara Bach to reach adulthood (d. 1739)
  - Ignazio Fiorillo, Italian composer (d. 1787)
- May 12 – Otto William Schwartz, Canadian politician (d. 1785)
- May 20 – William Whitfield II, American Army officer (d. 1795)
- May 22 – François-Joachim de Pierre de Bernis, French cardinal and statesman (d. 1794)
- June 7 – Lodewijk Caspar Valckenaer, Dutch classical scholar (d. 1785)
- June 12
  - Nicolas Thyrel de Boismont, French abbot (d. 1786)
  - Charles-René Dejordy de Villebon, French-Canadian explorer (d. 1761)
- June 13 – Anna Wilhelmine of Anhalt-Dessau, German noblewoman (d. 1780)
- June 15 – John Blennerhassett, Anglo-Irish politician (d. 1763)
- June 18 – Harry Grey, 4th Earl of Stamford, British earl, politician (d. 1768)
- June 25 – Joseph Foullon de Doué, French politician and a Controller-General of Finances under Louis XVI (d. 1789)
- June 29 – Pedro Antonio de Cevallos, Spanish military Governor of Buenos Aires between 1757 and 1766 (d. 1778)
- July 2 – Samuel Finley, American clergyman and educator (d. 1766)
- July 4
  - Christian Fürchtegott Gellert, German author (d. 1769)
  - Charles François Hutin, French painter (d. 1776)
- July 11 – Jean-Joseph Balechou, French artist (d. 1765)
- July 14 – Caterina Sagredo Barbarigo, Venetian aristocrat and salon holder (d. 1772)
- July 16 – Charles, Prince of Soubise, Marshal of France (d. 1787)
- July 17 – Fredericka of Saxe-Gotha-Altenburg, German noblewoman member of the House of Wettin and by marriage Duchess of Saxe-Weissenfels (d. 1775)
- July 26 – Jakob van der Schley, Dutch engraver (d. 1779)
- August 5 – Charlotte Sophie of Aldenburg, German sovereign (d. 1800)
- August 6 – Luc de Clapiers, marquis de Vauvenargues, French writer (d. 1747)
- August 18 – Cyrus Trapaud, British Army general (d. 1801)
- August 25 – Luis González Velázquez, Spanish painter (d. 1763)
- September 5 – Ignác Raab, Czech artist (d. 1787)
- September 15 – Jean-Baptiste Vaquette de Gribeauval, French artillery officer and engineer who revolutionized French cannon (d. 1789)
- September 19
  - Emmanuel-Félicité de Durfort de Duras, Marshal of France, politician (d. 1789)
  - Ferenc Esterházy, Hungarian politician (d. 1785)
- September 22 – Jean-Étienne Guettard, French scientist (d. 1786)
- September 25 – Princess Victoria Charlotte of Anhalt-Zeitz-Hoym, Margravine of Brandenburg-Bayreuth (d. 1772)
- September 26 – Lord George Graham, Royal Navy officer and MP (d. 1747)
- October 1 – Richard Jago, English clergyman poet and minor landscape gardener from Warwickshire (d. 1781)
- October 2 – Domenico Caracciolo, Italian politician (d. 1789)
- October 5
  - John Hustler, English Quaker industrialist (d. 1790)
  - Victor de Riqueti, marquis de Mirabeau, French economist of the Physiocratic school (d. 1789)
- October 6 – Antoine-Gabriel-François Benoist, soldier in the French army, served in North America (d. 1776)
- October 16 – Joseph Allegranza, Historian, archaeologist, antiquary (d. 1785)
- October 23 – Peter II of Russia, Emperor of Russia (d. 1730)
- October 29 – Aaron Cleveland, American clergyman (d. 1757)
- November 5
  - John Brown, English divine and author (d. 1766)
  - Felix of Nicosia, Cypriot Catholic saint (d. 1787)
  - Johann Georg Wille, German engraver (d. 1808)
- November 6 – Heneage Finch, 3rd Earl of Aylesford, Member of the Parliament of Great Britain (d. 1777)

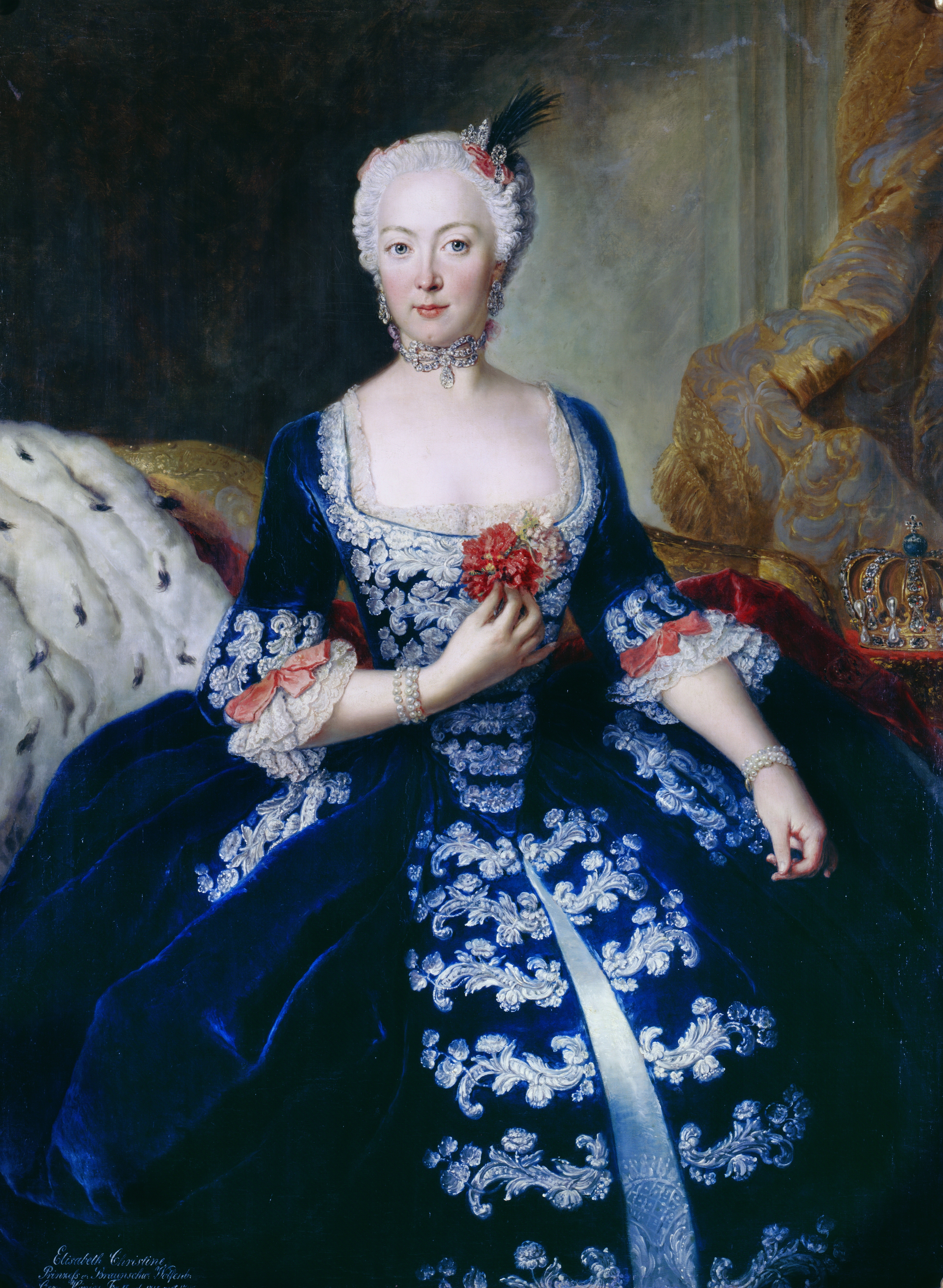
Queen Elisabeth Christine

- November 8 – Elisabeth Christine of Brunswick-Wolfenbüttel-Bevern, Crown Princess of Prussia (d. 1797)
- November 9 – Edward Bligh, 2nd Earl of Darnley, British noble (d. 1747)
- November 12 – Kajetan Sołtyk, Polish Catholic priest (d. 1788)
- November 13 – Dorothea Erxleben, first German female physician (d. 1762)
- November 16 – Girolamo Abos, Maltese-Italian composer (d. 1760)
- November 17 – Sir Danvers Osborn, 3rd Baronet, British politician and colonial governor (d. 1753)
- November 19 – Bertrand Philip, Count of Gronsveld, Dutch diplomat (d. 1772)
- November 20 – Pierre Charles Le Monnier, French astronomer (d. 1799)
- November 24 – Anna Nitschmann, German poet (d. 1760)
- November 26 – Jean-Charles Gervaise de Latouche, French writer (d. 1782)
- November 27 – Johann Gottlob Leidenfrost, German physician (d. 1794)
- November 30
  - Johann Philipp Bethmann, German merchant and banker (d. 1793)
  - Johan Jacob Bruun, Danish artist (d. 1789)
- December 4 – Abraham Drake, New Hampshire politician (d. 1781)
- December 9 – Joseph Marie Terray, Controller-General of Finances during the reign of Louis XV of France (d. 1778)
- December 11 – Johann Valentin Tischbein, German painter (d. 1768)
- December 12 – Gennaro Manna, Italian composer (d. 1779)
- December 18 – Johan Heinrich Becker, German physician and chemist who settled in Norway (d. 1761)
- December 21
  - Tommaso Gherardini, Italian painter (d. 1797)
  - Gottlieb Heinrich Totleben, German noble (d. 1773)
  - François-Vincent Toussaint, French writer most famous for Les Mœurs (The Manners) (d. 1772)
- December 27 – Philippe de Noailles, Marshal of France (d. 1794)
- December 30 – Thomas Watson, 3rd Earl of Rockingham, British politician (d. 1746)
- December 31 – Nicolas-Sylvestre Bergier, French Catholic theologian (d. 1790)

== Deaths ==
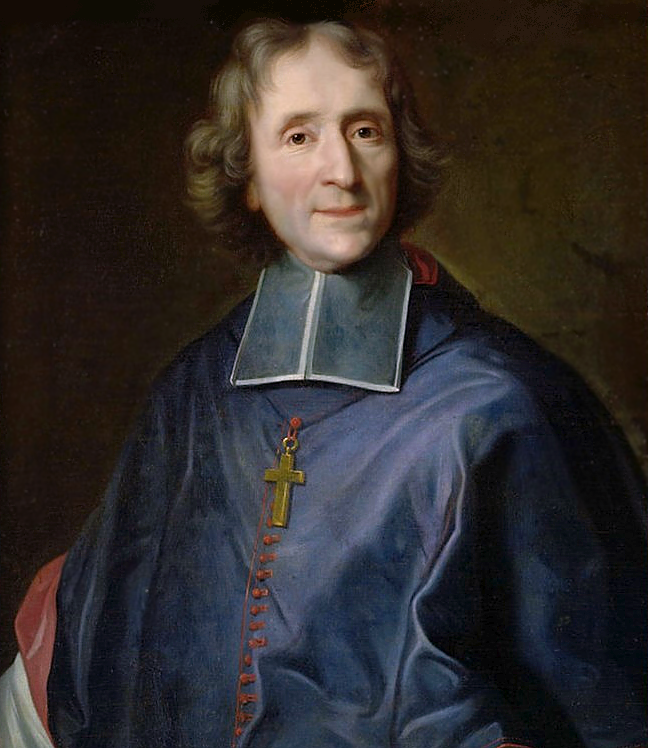
François Fénelon

- January 7
  - François Fénelon, Archbishop of Cambrai (b. 1651)
  - Mary Somerset, Duchess of Beaufort, British botanist (b. 1630)
- January 29 – Bernard Lamy, French Oratorian mathematician and theologian (b. 1640)
- January 27 – Caspar Neumann, German professor and clergyman (b. 1648)
- February 3 – Gottfried Vopelius, German academic (b. 1645)
- February 4 – Martín de Ursúa, Spanish conquistador (b. 1653)
- February 17 – Antoine Galland, French archaeologist (b. 1646)
- February 19 – Domenico Egidio Rossi, Italian architect (b. 1659)
- February 21 – Charles Calvert, 3rd Baron Baltimore, Colonial governor of Maryland (b. 1637)
- February 25 – Pu Songling, Qing Dynasty Chinese writer (b. 1640)
- March 2 – Cardinal de Bouillon, French Catholic cardinal (b. 1643)
- March 17 – Gilbert Burnet, Scottish Bishop of Salisbury (b. 1643)
- March 18 – William Fraser, 12th Lord Saltoun, (b.1654)
- March 27 – August, Duke of Saxe-Merseburg-Zörbig, German prince (b. 1655)

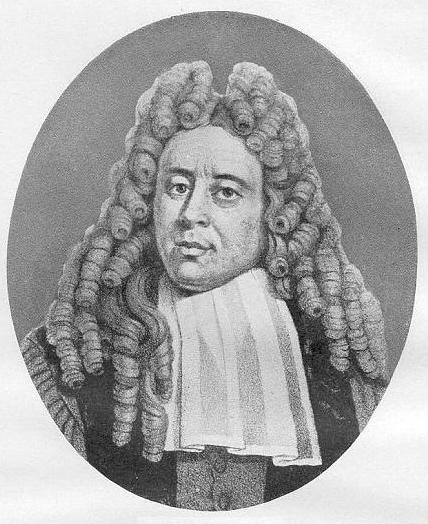
Perizonius

- April 6 – Perizonius, Dutch linguist (b. 1651)
- April 16 – Benedict Calvert, 4th Baron Baltimore, Colonial governor of Maryland (b. 1679)
- May 8 – Marie Mancini, Italian courtier, third of the five Mancini sisters (b. 1639)
- May 19 – Charles Montagu, English Chancellor of the Exchequer (b. 1661)
- May 21 – Pierre Magnol, French botanist (b. 1638)
- May 30 – Roeloff Swartwout, American city founder in New York (b. 1634)
- June 19 – Nicolas Lemery, French chemist (b. 1645)
- June 25 – Jean-Baptiste du Casse, French admiral and buccaneer (b. 1646)
- July 5 – Charles Ancillon, French Huguenot pastor (b. 1659)
- July 28 – Jakub Kresa, Czech mathematician (b. 1648)
- July 30 – Nahum Tate, Irish poet (b. 1652)
- August 21 – Countess Johanna Magdalene of Hanau-Lichtenberg, German countess (b. 1660)
- September 1
  - François Girardon, French sculptor (b. 1628)
  - King Louis XIV (b. 1638)

Louis XIV

- September 24 – Wilhelm Homberg, Dutch alchemist (b. 1652)
- October 13 – Nicolas Malebranche, French philosopher (b. 1638)
- October 14 – Thomas Tenison, Archbishop of Canterbury (b. 1636)
- October 15 – Humphry Ditton, English mathematician (b. 1675)
- October 17 – Ernest, Duke of Saxe-Hildburghausen (b. 1655)
- October 30 – Juliane Louise of East Frisia, Princess of East Frisia (b. 1657)
- October 31 – Elisha Cooke, Sr., Massachusetts colonial politician and judge (b. 1637)
- November – Mirwais Hotak, Pashtun emir, and founder of the Hotaki Dynasty (b. 1673)
- November 24 – Hedwig Eleonora of Holstein-Gottorp, queen consort of King Charles X of Sweden (b. 1636)
- December 9 – Benedetto Gennari II, Italian painter (b. 1633)
- December 15 – George Hickes, English minister and scholar (b. 1642)
- December 28
  - William Carstares, Scottish clergyman (b. 1649)
  - Joanna Koerten, Dutch painter (b. 1650)
- date unknown – Elizabeth Boutell, British stage actor (b. 1650)
