= 1794 =

1794 in various calendars
- Gregorian calendar: 1794; MDCCXCIV
- French Republican calendar: 2–3; II–III
- Ab urbe condita: 2547
- Armenian calendar: 1243; ԹՎ ՌՄԽԳ
- Assyrian calendar: 6544
- Balinese saka calendar: 1715–1716
- Bengali calendar: 1200–1201
- Berber calendar: 2744
- British Regnal year: 34 Geo. 3 – 35 Geo. 3
- Buddhist calendar: 2338
- Burmese calendar: 1156
- Byzantine calendar: 7302–7303
- Chinese calendar: 癸丑年 (Water Ox); 4491 or 4284 — to — 甲寅年 (Wood Tiger); 4492 or 4285
- Coptic calendar: 1510–1511
- Discordian calendar: 2960
- Ethiopian calendar: 1786–1787
- Hebrew calendar: 5554–5555
- Hindu calendars
- Vikram Samvat: 1850–1851
- Shaka Samvat: 1715–1716
- Kali Yuga: 4894–4895
- Holocene calendar: 11794
- Igbo calendar: 794–795
- Iranian calendar: 1172–1173
- Islamic calendar: 1208–1209
- Japanese calendar: Kansei 6 (寛政６年)
- Javanese calendar: 1720–1721
- Julian calendar: Gregorian minus 11 days
- Korean calendar: 4127
- Minguo calendar: 118 before ROC 民前118年
- Nanakshahi calendar: 326
- Thai solar calendar: 2336–2337
- Tibetan calendar: ཆུ་མོ་གླང་ལོ་ (female Water-Ox); 1920 or 1539 or 767 — to — ཤིང་ཕོ་སྟག་ལོ་ (male Wood-Tiger); 1921 or 1540 or 768

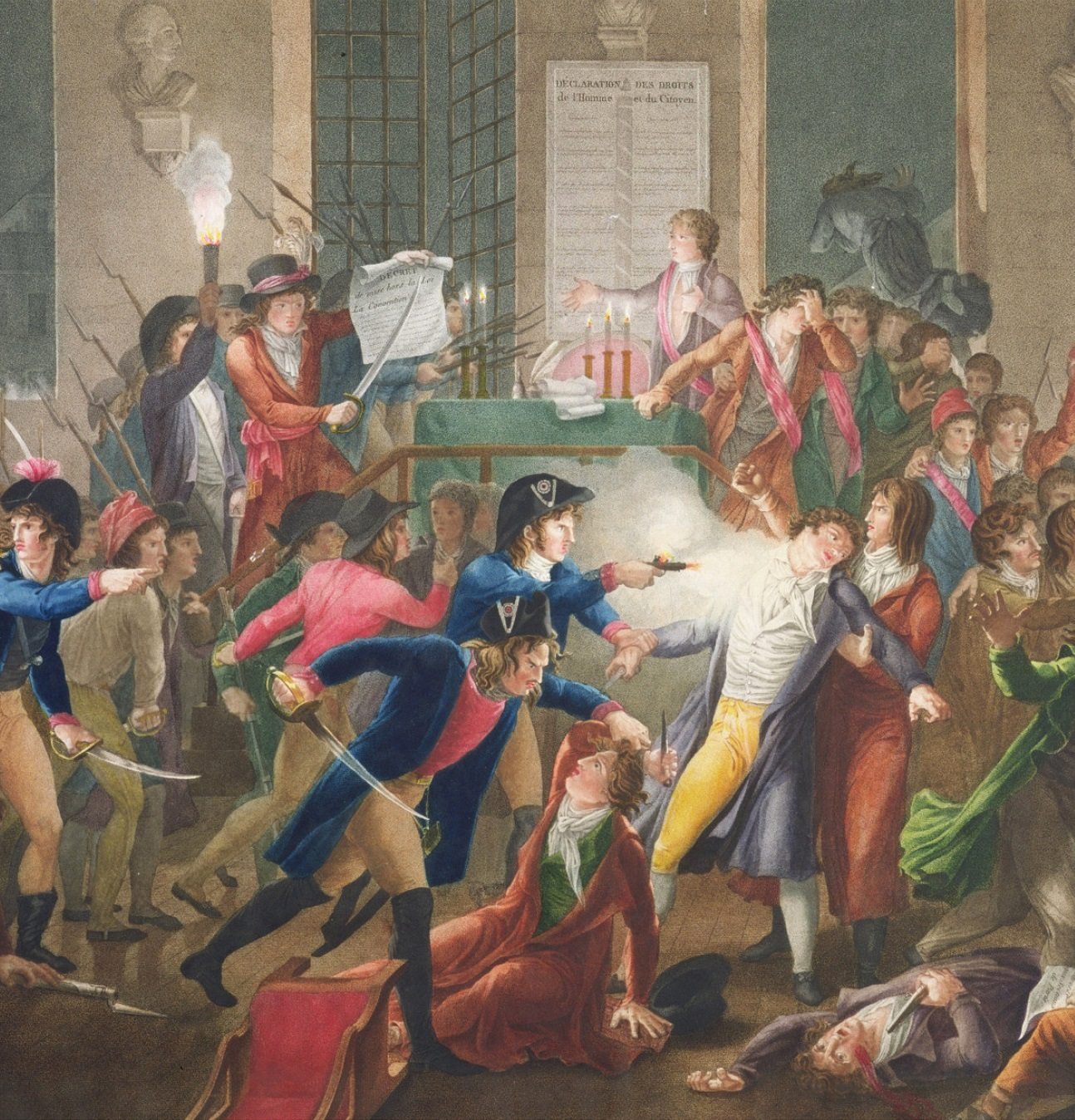
July 27: Maximilien Robespierre and Louis Antoine de Saint-Just are arrested in the town hall of Paris, ending the Reign of Terror in France.

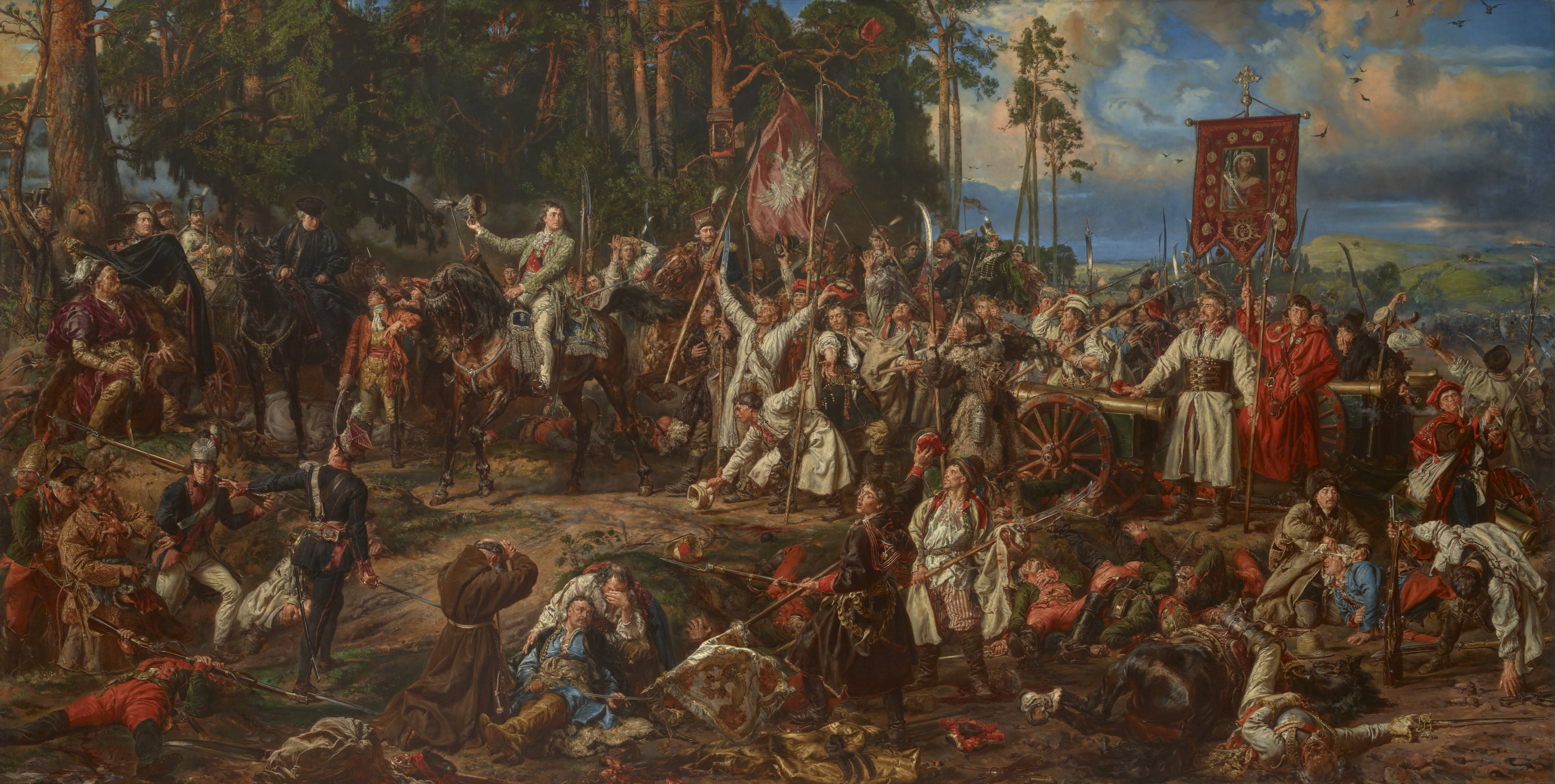
April 4: Battle of Racławice

1794 (MDCCXCIV) was a common year starting on Wednesday of the Gregorian calendar and a common year starting on Sunday of the Julian calendar, the 1794th year of the Common Era (CE) and Anno Domini (AD) designations, the 794th year of the 2nd millennium, the 94th year of the 18th century, and the 5th year of the 1790s decade. As of the start of 1794, the Gregorian calendar was 11 days ahead of the Julian calendar, which remained in localized use until 1923.

== Events ==
=== January–March ===
- January 1 – The Stibo Group is founded by Niels Lund as a printing company in Aarhus (Denmark).
- January 13 – The U.S. Congress enacts a law providing for, effective May 1, 1795, a United States flag of 15 stars and 15 stripes, in recognition of the recent admission of Vermont and Kentucky as the 14th and 15th states. A subsequent act restores the number of stripes to 13, but provides for additional stars upon the admission of each additional state.
- January 21 – King George III of Great Britain delivers the speech opening Parliament and recommends a continuation of Britain's war with France.
- February 4 – French Revolution: The National Convention of the French First Republic abolishes slavery.
- February 8 – Wreck of the Ten Sail on Grand Cayman.
- February 11 – The first session of the United States Senate is open to the public.
- March 4 – The Eleventh Amendment to the United States Constitution is passed by Congress for submission to the states for ratification.
- March 11 – Canonsburg Academy (modern-day Washington & Jefferson College) is chartered by the Pennsylvania General Assembly.
- March 12 – General Antoni Madaliński, a commander of the National Cavalry in the Polish–Lithuanian Commonwealth, disobeys an order from the ruling Russian Empire and Kingdom of Prussia imposing demobilization, advancing his troops from Ostrołęka to Kraków.
- March 14 – Eli Whitney is granted a United States patent for the cotton gin.
- March 22 – Congress prohibits American ships from supplying slaves to any nation other than the United States, setting a penalty of forfeiture of the ship and a $2,000 fine.
- March 23 – British troops capture Martinique from the French.
- March 24 – Tadeusz Kościuszko makes his proclamation starting the Kościuszko Uprising against the Russian Empire and Kingdom of Prussia in the Polish–Lithuanian Commonwealth and Prussian Partition.
- March 26 – The U.S. lays a 60-day embargo on all shipping to and from Great Britain.
- March 27
  - The United States Government authorizes the building of the first six United States Navy vessels; in 1797 the first three frigates, United States, Constellation and Constitution will go into service (not to be confused with October 13, 1775, which is observed as the Navy's Birthday).
  - The U.S. Senate passes a rule ending its policy of closing all of its sessions to the public.

=== April–June ===
- April 4 – Battle of Racławice: Polish supporters of the Kościuszko Uprising defeat forces of the Russian Empire.
- April 5 – Reign of Terror: Georges Danton and Camille Desmoulins are executed.
- April 17–19 – Kościuszko Uprising – Warsaw Uprising: The Polish people overthrow the Russian garrison in Warsaw.
- April 19 – Britain, Prussia and the Netherlands sign a treaty of alliance against France.
- April 28 – Sardinian Vespers: The people of Cagliari in Sardinia oust the viceroy and his Piedmontese functionaries.
- April 29–May 1 – Battle of Boulou: The French defeat the Spanish and Portuguese forces.
- May 7 – Maximilien Robespierre establishes the Cult of the Supreme Being as the new state religion of the French First Republic.
- May 8 – Reign of Terror: chemist Antoine Lavoisier is tried, convicted and executed in Paris with 27 co-defendants also associated with the former ferme générale.
- May 18 – Battle of Tourcoing: French troops defeat British forces.
- May 21 – the French Revolutionary Government decides that the Terror would be centralised, with almost all the tribunals in the provinces closed and all the trials held in Paris.
- May 28–June 1 – The Glorious First of June (Battle of Ushant): The British win a crushing tactical victory over the French fleet, but the merchant convoy escorted by the French fleet arrives safely in France.
- May 30–June 4 – Battle of Port-Républicain: British troops capture Port-au-Prince in Haiti from the French.
- June 17
  - The Anglo-Corsican Kingdom is established.
  - Battle of Mykonos: The British Royal Navy captures French frigate Sibylle.
- June 24 – Bowdoin College is founded in Brunswick, Maine.
- June 26 – Battle of Fleurus: French forces defeat the Austrians and their allies, leading to permanent loss of the Austrian Netherlands and destruction of the Dutch Republic. French use of an observation balloon marks the first participation of an aircraft in battle.
- June–July – Mount Vesuvius erupts in Italy; the town of Torre del Greco is destroyed.

=== July–September ===
- July 12 – Horatio Nelson loses the sight in his right eye in the British Siege of Calvi in Corsica.
- July 13 – Battle of Trippstadt between French forces and those of Prussia and Austria (First Coalition).
- July 13–September 6 – Kościuszko Uprising: Siege of Warsaw – The Polish people resist a siege by armies of the Russian Empire and Kingdom of Prussia.
- July 17 – The sixteen Carmelite Martyrs of Compiègne are guillotined in Paris in the last stage of the French Revolution's Reign of Terror.
- July 27 (9 Thermidor) – French Revolution – Thermidorian Reaction: Maximilien, Augustin Robespierre and Saint-Just are arrested on the orders of the French National Convention; they are executed the next day, ending the French Revolution's Reign of Terror.
- August – Colombian Antonio Nariño is denounced as a traitor after he translates and publishes the French Declaration of the Rights of Man and of the Citizen.
- August 1 – Aristocrats in Sweden gather to mourn the demise of coffee after the beverage is forbidden by royal decree.
- August 9 – Napoleon is arrested and put under house arrest at Nice for his association with the Robespierres during their fall in the Thermidorian Reaction. He is later taken to Antibes and detained in a military fort.
- August 20 – Battle of Fallen Timbers in Northwestern Ohio: American troops under the command of General Anthony Wayne (nicknamed "Mad Anthony") defeat Native American tribes of the Western Confederacy.
- August 21 – British troops capture Corsica following the bombardment by Nelson.
- August 29 – Stonyhurst College is finally established as a Roman Catholic school in Lancashire, England, having had several European locations.
- September 10 – The University of Tennessee is established at Knoxville.
- September 23 – France occupies Aachen.
- September 28 – Austria, Britain and Russia ally against France.

=== October–December ===
- October 2 – Battle of Aldenhoven between French forces and those of Austria.
- October 4 – In the first and only instance of an incumbent United States president leading men into battle, George Washington arrives at Carlisle, Pennsylvania to guide the U.S. Army's suppression of the Whiskey Rebellion. The rebels soon disperse and the insurrection collapses by the end of the month.
- October 10 – Battle of Maciejowice: Forces of the Russian Empire defeat Polish supporters of the Kościuszko Uprising; Tadeusz Kościuszko is wounded and captured.
- October 22 – Fort Wayne founded in what is now the U.S. state of Indiana.
- November 4 – Battle of Praga: Russian General Alexander Suvorov storms Warsaw in the war against the Polish Kościuszko Uprising and captures Praga, one of its suburbs, unwittingly killing many civilians.
- November 14 – The first recorded meeting of the Franklin Literary Society is held at Canonsburg Academy (modern-day Washington & Jefferson College).
- November 16 – The Kościuszko Uprising ends in the defeat of Tadeusz Kościuszko and his forces.
- November 19 – The United States and Great Britain sign the Jay Treaty (coming into effect in 1796), which attempts to clear up some issues left over from the American Revolutionary War and secures a decade of peaceful trade between the two nations. Britain agrees to evacuate border forts in the Northwest Territory (roughly the area north of the Ohio River and east of the Mississippi) and thereby end British support for the Indians.
- November 20 – Battle of St-Laurent-de-la-Muga fought between French and Spanish forces.
- December 8 – The Great New Orleans Fire (1794) burns over 200 buildings in the French Quarter.
- December 23 – St. Louis Cathedral, New Orleans is dedicated.

=== Date unknown ===
- The Ayrshire (Earl of Carrick's Own) Yeomanry, a British Yeomanry Cavalry Regiment, is formed by the Earl of Cassillis at Culzean Castle, Ayrshire.
- The Oban distillery is built in Scotland.

== Births ==
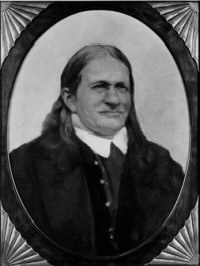
Friedlieb Ferdinand Runge

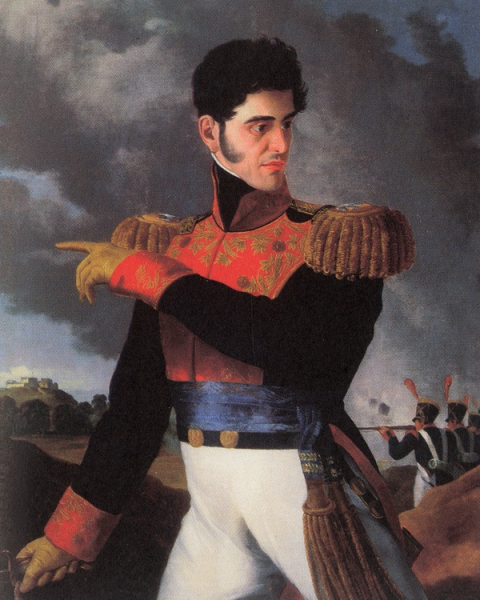
Antonio López de Santa Anna

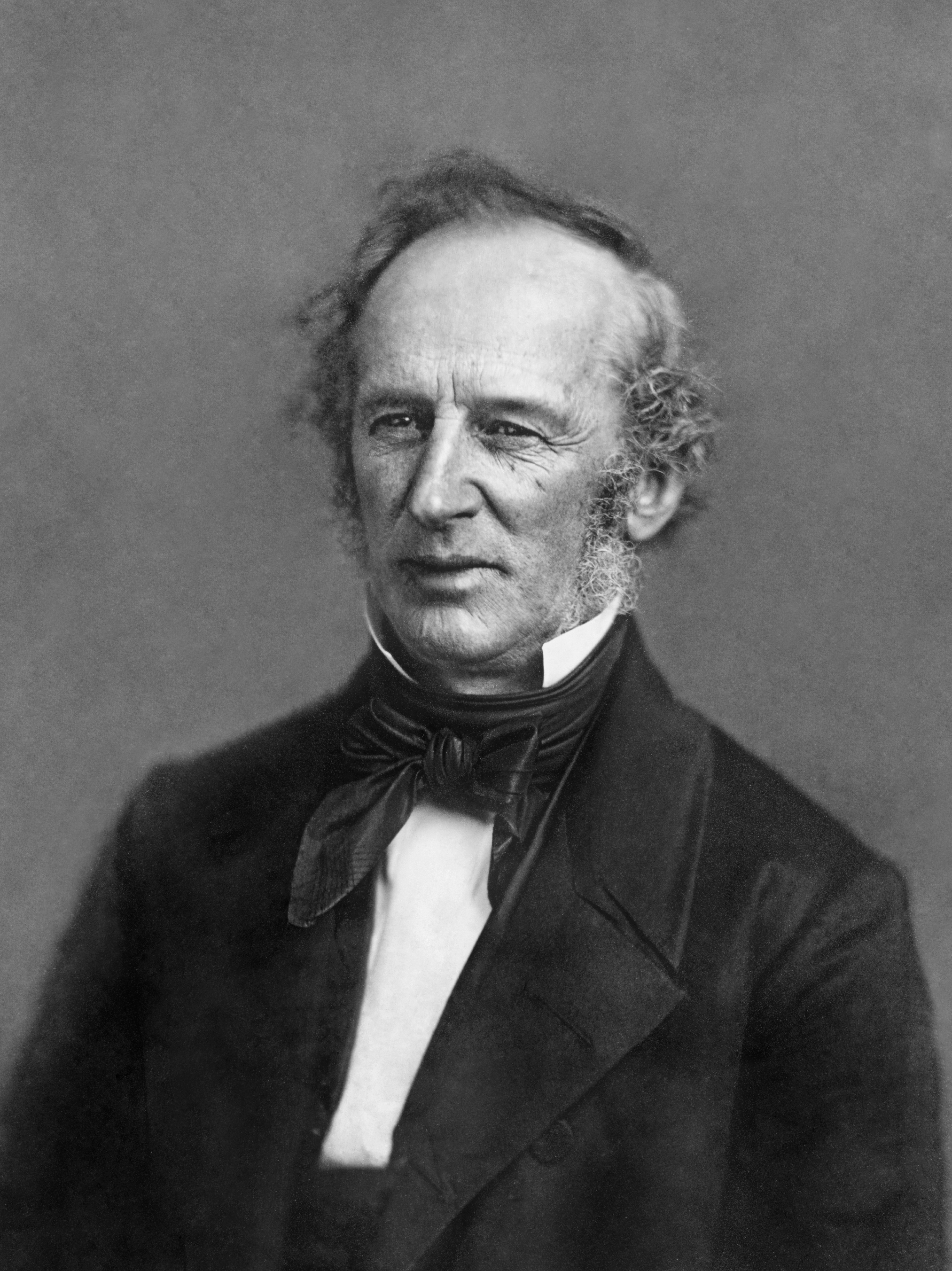
Cornelius Vanderbilt

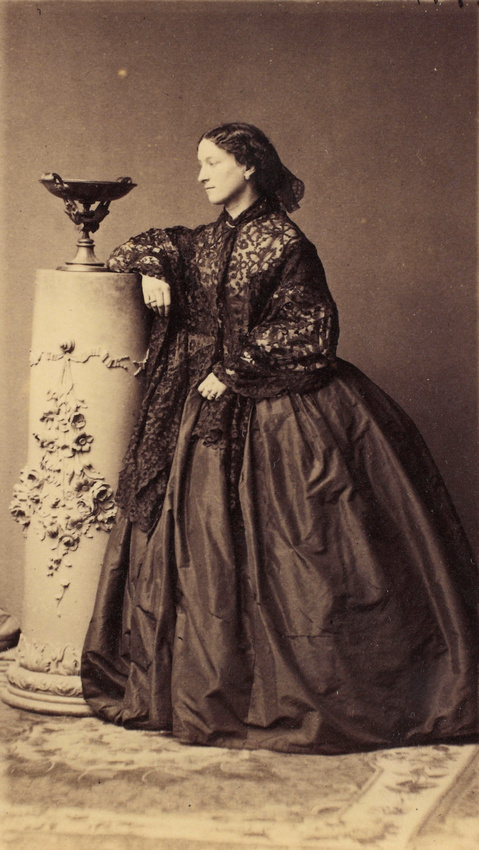
Jeanne Villepreux-Power

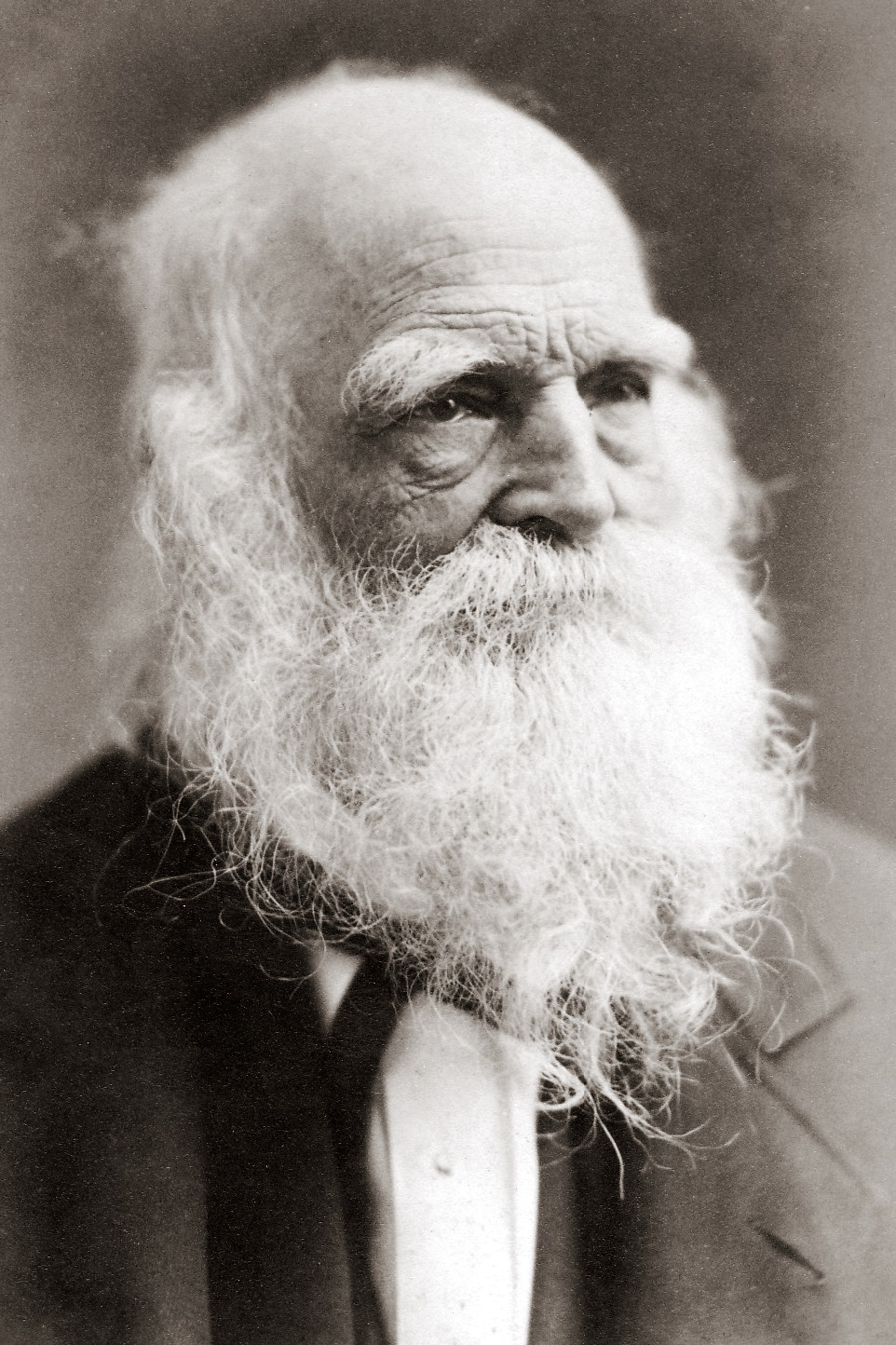
William Cullen Bryant

- January 7 – Eilhard Mitscherlich, German chemist (d. 1863)
- February 8 – Friedlieb Ferdinand Runge, German chemist (d. 1867)
- February 11 – Charlotta Eriksson, Swedish actor (d. 1862)
- February 20 – William Carleton, Irish novelist (d. 1869)
- February 21 – Antonio López de Santa Anna, Mexican general and President of Mexico (d. 1876)
- March 5
  - Robert Cooper Grier, Associate Justice of the Supreme Court of the United States (d. 1870)
  - Joseph Livesey, English temperance movement campaigner (d. 1884)
- April 10 – Matthew Calbraith Perry, American commodore (d. 1858)
- April 11 – Edward Everett, American politician (d. 1865)
- May 17 – Anna Brownell Jameson, British writer (d. 1860)
- May 24 – William Whewell, English scientist, philosopher and historian of science (d. 1866)
- May 27 – Cornelius Vanderbilt, American entrepreneur (d. 1877)
- June 16 – María Trinidad Sánchez, heroine of the Dominican War of Independence (d. 1846)
- July 5 – Sylvester Graham, American nutritionist, inventor (d. 1851)
- July 7 – Frances Stackhouse Acton, British botanist, archaeologist, writer and artist (d. 1881)
- July 18 – Feargus O'Connor, Irish political radical, Chartist leader (d. 1855)
- July 28 – Charles Longley, Archbishop of Canterbury (d. 1868)
- August 8 – Francesco Puccinotti, Italian pathologist (d. 1872)
- September 24 – Jeanne Villepreux-Power, French marine biologist (d. 1871)
- November 3 – William Cullen Bryant, American poet (d. 1878)
- November 10 – Robert Towns, merchant, founder of Townsville, Queensland, Australia (d. 1873)

=== Date unknown ===
- Caroline Howard Gilman, American author (d. 1888)
- Gustafva Lindskog, Swedish athlete (d. 1851)

== Deaths ==
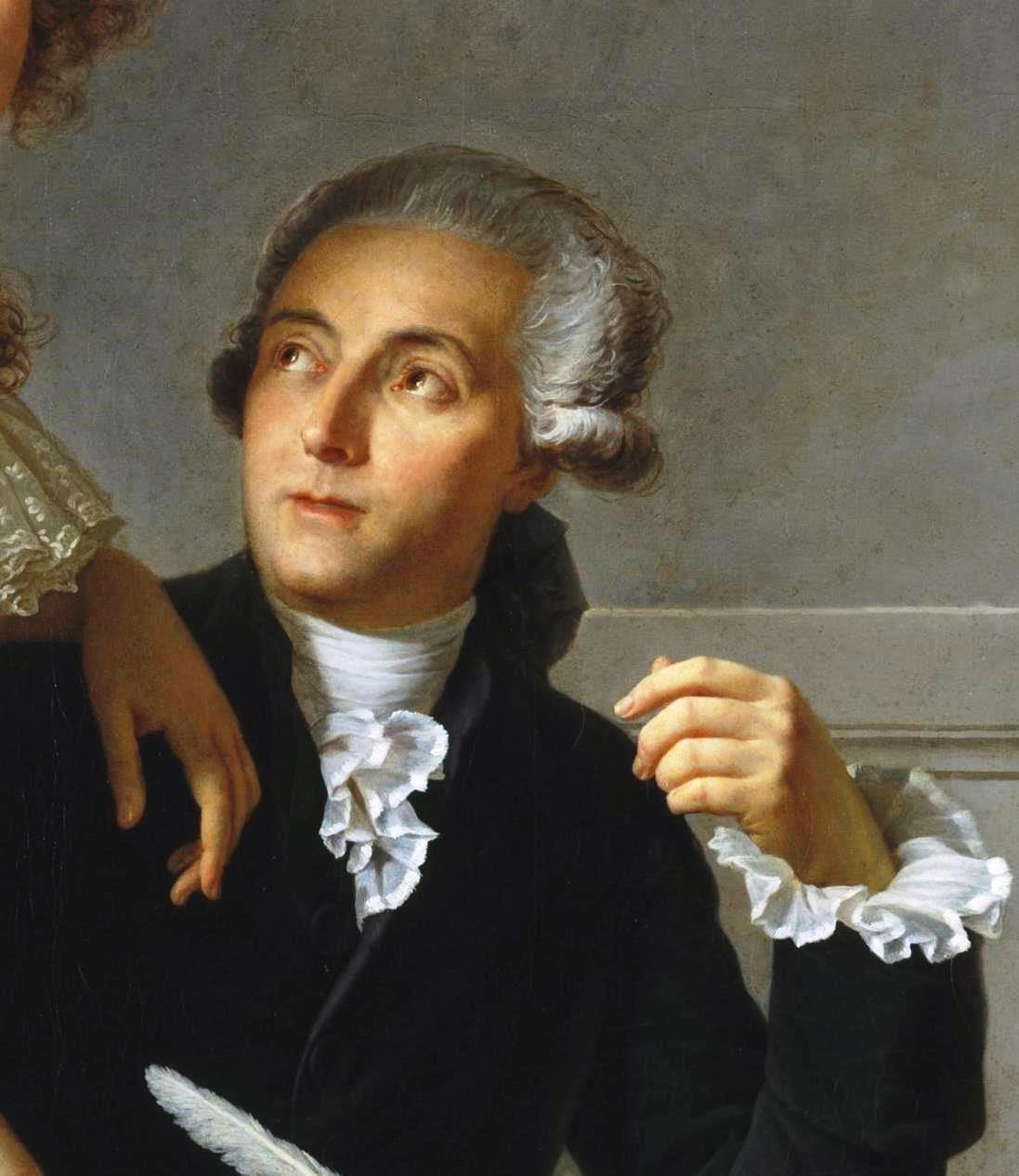
Antoine Lavoisier

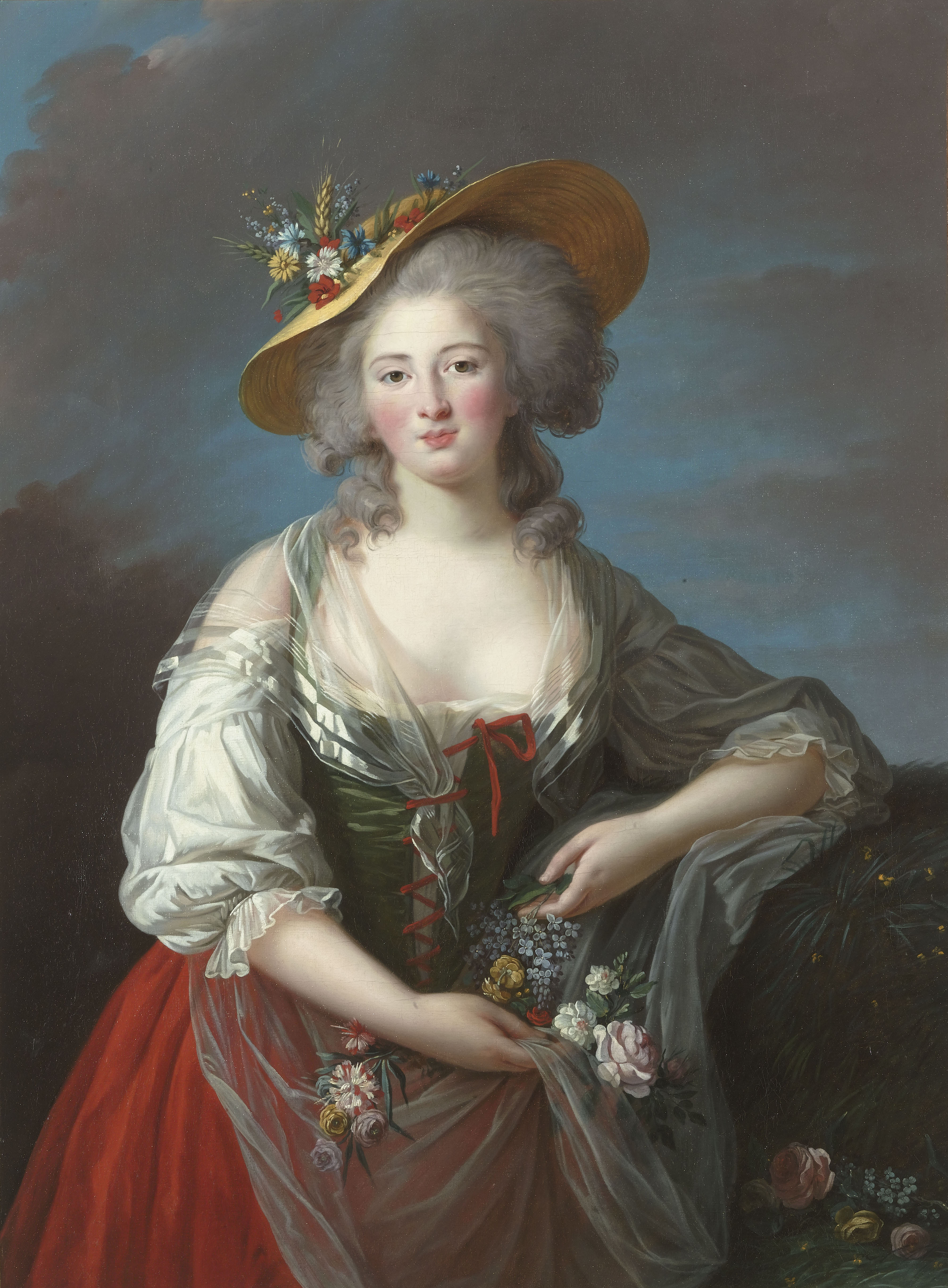
Élisabeth of France

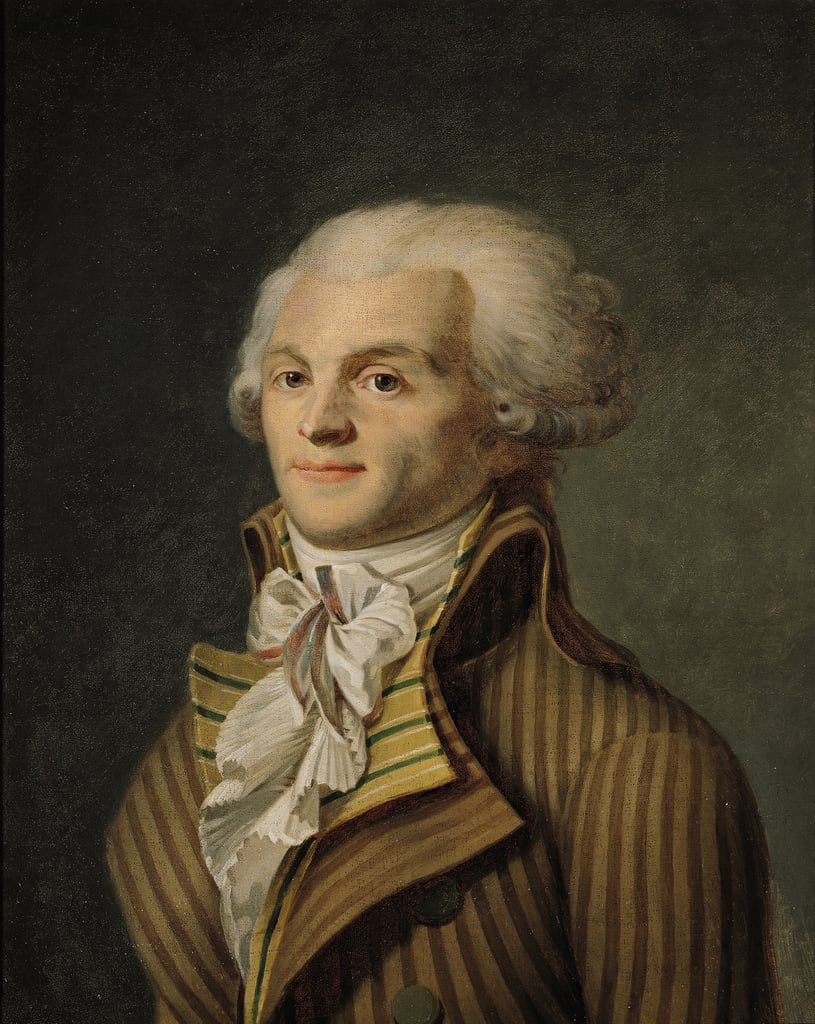
Maximilien Robespierre

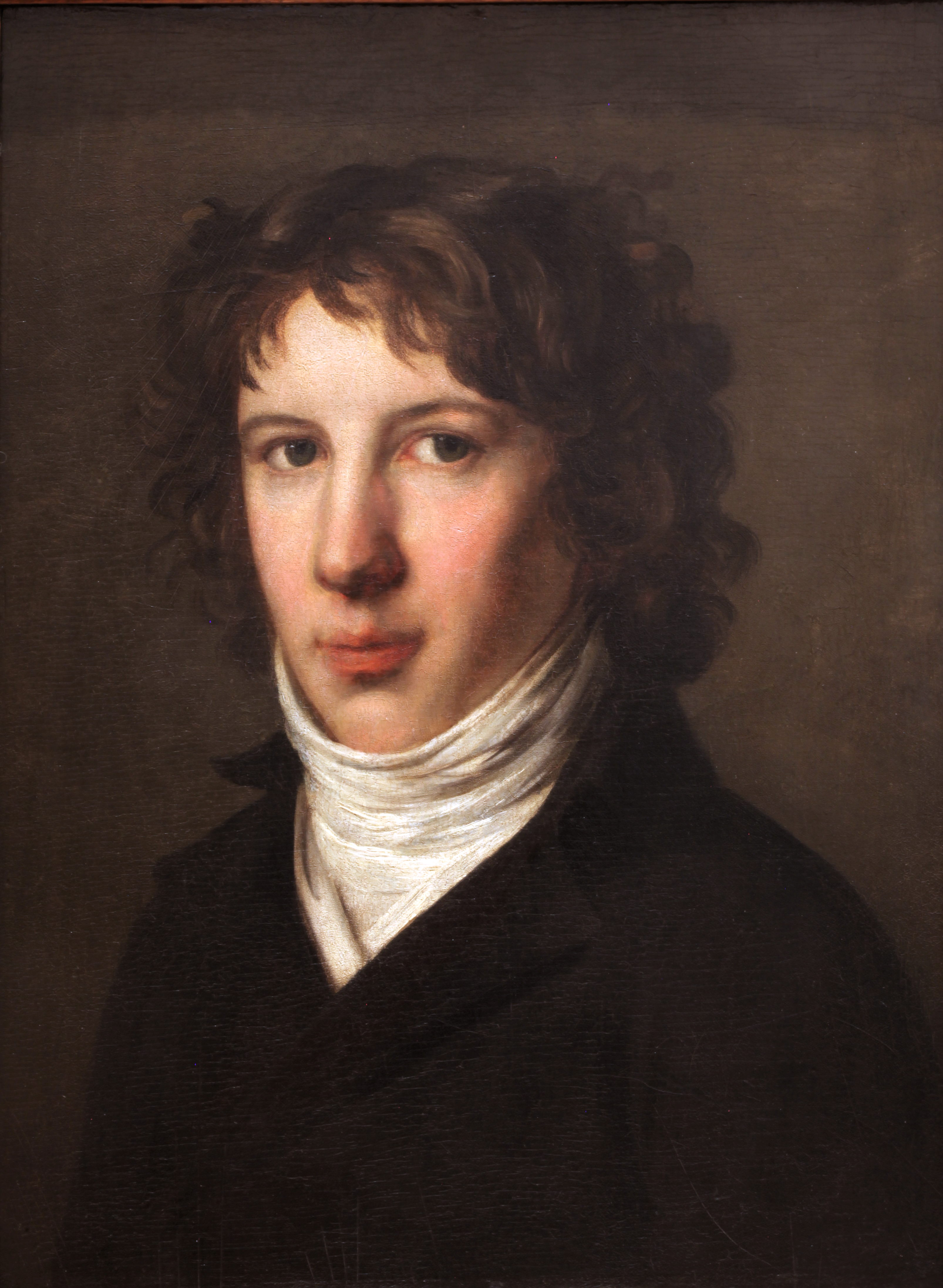
Louis Antoine de Saint-Just

- January 4 – Nicolas Luckner, Marshal of France (executed) (b. 1722)
- January 6
  - Pierre Bouchet, French physician (b. 1752)
  - Maurice d'Elbée, French Revolutionary leader (executed) (b. 1752)
- January 8 – Justus Möser, German statesman (b. 1720)
- January 11 – Caroline Townshend, 1st Baroness Greenwich, English peeress (b. 1717)
- January 16 – Edward Gibbon, English historian (b. 1737)
- January 17 – Peniston Portlock Powney, English politician (b. 1743)
- January 24 – Marie-Adélaïde de La Touche-Limouzinière, French aristocrat, counter-revolutionary and combatant in the War of the Vendée (b. 1760)
- January 28 – Henri de la Rochejaquelein, French Revolutionary leader (b. 1772)
- January 31 – Mariot Arbuthnot, British admiral (b. 1711)
- February 10 – Jacques Roux, French priest (b. 1752)
- February 12 – Mahadaji Shinde, Maratha emperor of India (1764–1794)
- March 24 – Jacques Hébert, French Revolutionary leader (executed) (b. 1757)
- March 29 – Marquis de Condorcet, French mathematician, philosopher and political scientist (died in prison) (b. 1743)
- April 5
  - Georges Danton, French Revolutionary leader (executed) (b. 1759)
  - Camille Desmoulins, French Revolutionary leader (executed) (b. 1760)
  - Marie-Jean Hérault de Séchelles, French Revolutionary leader (executed) (b. 1759)
  - Fabre d'Églantine, French dramatist, revolutionary (executed) (b. 1750)
  - François Joseph Westermann, French Revolutionary leader and general (executed) (b. 1751)
- April 13
  - Pierre Gaspard Chaumette, French Revolutionary leader (executed) (b. 1763)
  - Lucile Duplessis, wife of Camille Desmoulins (executed) (b. 1770)
- April 17 – Angélique du Coudray, pioneering French midwife (b. 1714)
- April 18 – Charles Pratt, 1st Earl Camden, Lord Chancellor of Great Britain (b. 1714)
- April 23 – Guillaume-Chrétien de Lamoignon de Malesherbes, French statesman (executed) (b. 1721)
- April 27
  - James Bruce, Scottish explorer (b. 1730)
  - Sir William Jones, British philologist (b. 1746)
- May 8 – Antoine Lavoisier, French chemist (executed) (b. 1743)
- May 10 – Élisabeth of France, French princess (executed) (b. 1764)
- May 17 – Sir Thomas Dyke Acland, 9th Baronet (b. 1752)
- May 27 – Mary Palmer, English writer (b. 1716)
- June 14 – Francis Seymour-Conway, 1st Marquess of Hertford, Viceroy of Ireland (b. 1718)
- June 17 – Marguerite-Élie Guadet, French Revolutionary leader (executed) (b. 1753)
- June 18
  - François Buzot, French Revolutionary leader (suicide) (b. 1760)
  - James Murray, British military officer, administrator (b. 1721)
- June 19 – Richard Henry Lee, 12th President of the Continental Congress (b. 1732)
- June 25 – Jean-Olivier Briand, French-born Catholic bishop of Quebec (b. 1715)
- June 27
  - Wenzel Anton, Prince of Kaunitz-Rietberg, Austrian statesman (b. 1711)
  - Philippe de Noailles, French soldier (executed) (b. 1715)
  - Victor de Broglie, French soldier (executed) (b. 1756)
- July 13 – James Lind, British pioneer of naval hygiene in the Royal Navy (b. 1716)
- July 17 – John Roebuck, English inventor (b. 1718)
- July 23 – Alexandre de Beauharnais, French politician and general (executed) (b. 1760)
- July 25
  - André Chénier, French writer (executed) (b. 1762)
  - Joseph Frye, American general (b. 1712)
- July 28
  - Maximilien Robespierre, French Revolutionary leader (executed) (b. 1758)
  - Augustin Robespierre, French Revolutionary leader (executed) (b. 1763)
  - Louis Antoine de Saint-Just, French Revolutionary leader (executed) (b. 1767)
  - Jean-Baptiste de Lavalette, French general (executed) (b. 1753)
  - François Hanriot, French Revolutionary leader (executed) (b. 1761)
- August 6 – Henry Bathurst, 2nd Earl Bathurst, British politician (b. 1714)
- August 14 – Jacoba van den Brande, Dutch cultural personality (b. 1735)
- August 17 – Countess Palatine Elisabeth Auguste of Sulzbach, politically active Electress of Bavaria (b. 1721)
- September 1 – Catherine Théot, French visionary (b. 1716)
- September 4 – John Hely-Hutchinson, Irish statesman (b. 1724)
- September 15 – Abraham Clark, American signer of the Declaration of Independence (b. 1725)
- September 16 – Hester Bateman, English silversmith (bap. 1708)
- September 25 – Paul Rabaut, French Huguenot pastor (b. 1718)
- October 21
  - Francis Light, founder of the British colony of Penang (b. 1740)
  - Antoine Petit, French physician (b. 1722)
- November 3 – François-Joachim de Pierre de Bernis, French cardinal, statesman (b. 1715)
- November 9 – Thomas Walker, distinguished Virginia physician, explorer (b. 1715)
- November 15
  - Countess Palatine Maria Franziska of Sulzbach, German aristocrat (b. 1724)
  - John Witherspoon, American signer of the Declaration of Independence (b. 1723)
- November 22
  - John Alsop, American Continental Congressman (b. 1724)
  - Alison Cockburn, British poet (b. 1712)
- November 28
  - Friedrich Wilhelm von Steuben, Prussian army officer (b. 1730)
  - Sir James Tylney-Long, 7th Baronet, English politician (b. 1736)
- December 2 – Johann Gottlob Leidenfrost, German physician (b. 1715)
- December 12 – Meshullam Feivush Heller, Austrian Hasidic author (b. c. 1742)
- December 16 – Jean-Baptiste Carrier, French Revolutionary leader (executed) (b. 1756)
