= 1767 =

1767 in various calendars
- Gregorian calendar: 1767; MDCCLXVII
- Ab urbe condita: 2520
- Armenian calendar: 1216; ԹՎ ՌՄԺԶ
- Assyrian calendar: 6517
- Balinese saka calendar: 1688–1689
- Bengali calendar: 1173–1174
- Berber calendar: 2717
- British Regnal year: 7 Geo. 3 – 8 Geo. 3
- Buddhist calendar: 2311
- Burmese calendar: 1129
- Byzantine calendar: 7275–7276
- Chinese calendar: 丙戌年 (Fire Dog); 4464 or 4257 — to — 丁亥年 (Fire Pig); 4465 or 4258
- Coptic calendar: 1483–1484
- Discordian calendar: 2933
- Ethiopian calendar: 1759–1760
- Hebrew calendar: 5527–5528
- Hindu calendars
- Vikram Samvat: 1823–1824
- Shaka Samvat: 1688–1689
- Kali Yuga: 4867–4868
- Holocene calendar: 11767
- Igbo calendar: 767–768
- Iranian calendar: 1145–1146
- Islamic calendar: 1180–1181
- Japanese calendar: Meiwa 4 (明和４年)
- Javanese calendar: 1692–1693
- Julian calendar: Gregorian minus 11 days
- Korean calendar: 4100
- Minguo calendar: 145 before ROC 民前145年
- Nanakshahi calendar: 299
- Thai solar calendar: 2309–2310
- Tibetan calendar: མེ་ཕོ་ཁྱི་ལོ་ (male Fire-Dog); 1893 or 1512 or 740 — to — མེ་མོ་ཕག་ལོ་ (female Fire-Boar); 1894 or 1513 or 741

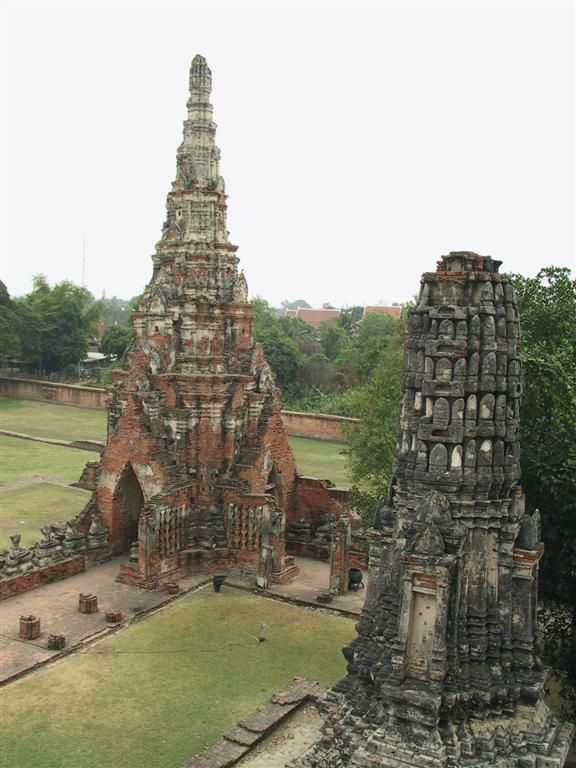
April 7: Ayutthaya (in modern-day Thailand) is sacked by the troops of the Burmese Konbaung dynasty

1767 (MDCCLXVII) was a common year starting on Thursday of the Gregorian calendar and a common year starting on Monday of the Julian calendar, the 1767th year of the Common Era (CE) and Anno Domini (AD) designations, the 767th year of the 2nd millennium, the 67th year of the 18th century, and the 8th year of the 1760s decade. As of the start of 1767, the Gregorian calendar was 11 days ahead of the Julian calendar, which remained in localized use until 1923.

== Events ==
=== January–March ===
- January 1 – The first annual volume of The Nautical Almanac and Astronomical Ephemeris, produced by British Astronomer Royal Nevil Maskelyne at the Royal Observatory, Greenwich, gives navigators the means to find longitude at sea, using tables of lunar distance.
- January 9 – William Tryon, governor of the Royal Colony of North Carolina, signs a contract with architect John Hawks to build Tryon Palace, a lavish Georgian style governor's mansion on the New Bern waterfront.
- February 16 – On orders from head of state Pasquale Paoli of the newly independent Republic of Corsica, a contingent of about 200 Corsican soldiers begins an invasion of the small island of Capraia off of the coast of northern Italy and territory of the Republic of Genoa. By May 31, the island is conquered as its defenders surrender.
- February 19 – The Earl of Shelburne, British Secretary of State for the Southern Department (which has jurisdiction over Britain's American colonies) fires the unpopular Governor of West Florida, George Johnstone, and summons him back to London.
- February 27 – King Carlos III of Spain issues a decree expelling the Jesuits from the dominions of the Spanish Empire worldwide.
- March 13 – British Chancellor of the Exchequer Charles Townshend, having already pushed through the unpopular Townshend Acts to recoup war expenses from Britain's American colonies, presents a comprehensive plan for more taxes in a closed door session of the House of Commons, with most proposals passed within a month.
- March 14 – Antonio de Ulloa, the Colonial Governor of Spanish Louisiana (Luisiana), dispatches Captain Francisco Ríu y Morales up the Mississippi River to establish two forts, one at San Luis (now St. Louis, Missouri) and to set up a colony for displaced French-speaking Acadians and protect shipping on the river.
- March 24 – Spain acquires control of what are now called the Falkland Islands from France, compensating French Admiral Louis Antoine de Bougainville for the money spent on the construction of the settlement at Fort Saint Louis. The islands, named les Îles Malouines by the French, are renamed las Islas Malvinas by the Spanish, and Fort Saint Louis is renamed as Puerto Soledad. In 1816, Argentina declares independence from Spain and takes the Malvinas; and in 1833, Britain's Royal Navy captures the islands from the Argentines and renames them the Falklands, and renames Puerto Soledad as Port Louis.
- March 31 – Enforcement begins of the February 27 decree by King Carlos III of Spain, ordering the suppression of the Society of Jesus (the Jesuits) in the colonies in Spanish America. Over the next few months approximately 2,200 Jesuit priests and missionaries are deported.

=== April–June ===
- April 2 – Suppression of the Jesuits begins, in the Spanish Empire and Kingdom of Naples.
- April 7 – Troops of the Burmese Konbaung dynasty sack the Siamese city of Ayutthaya, ending the Burmese–Siamese War (1765–1767) after 15 months, and bringing the four-century-old Ayutthaya Kingdom to an end. King Ekkathat is found dead inside the city walls on April 9.
- May 3 – A fleet of ships from the Republic of Genoa arrives at Capraia and sends 150 men ashore to drive out the Corsicans, but the outnumbered Genoese marines are "quickly cut to pieces".
- May 10 – Sir William Johnson, 1st Baronet, acting on behalf of Great Britain, meets with representatives of the Six Nations of the Iroquois Confederacy at German Flatts, New York, opening negotiations on the boundary between the New York colony and the Native Americans, eventually concluded by the Treaty of Fort Stanwix.
- May 16 – Ahmed al-Ghazzal, the emissary from Sultan Mohammed ben Abdallah of Morocco to the Spanish Empire, makes a triumphant return to Marrakesh with almost 300 Muslims who had been held captive in Spain, as well as sacred Islamic manuscripts that had been seized by the Spanish in 1612. The negotiation of the release had started with al-Ghazzal's meeting with Spain's King Carlos III on August 21, 1766.
- May 31 – The Genoese island of Capraia is conquered by the Corsican Army after a ten-week campaign.
- June 17 – British Royal Navy Captain Samuel Wallis becomes the first European to visit the island of Tahiti in the Pacific Ocean, during HMS Dolphin's second circumnavigation; he also sights Mehetia.

=== July–September ===
- July 3
  - Pitcairn Island in the Pacific Ocean is sighted from HMS Swallow, by 15-year-old Midshipman Robert Pitcairn, on a British Royal Navy expeditionary voyage commanded by Philip Carteret, the first definite European sighting.
  - Norway's oldest newspaper still in print, Adresseavisen, is first published.
- August 26 – Construction begins on Tryon Palace in New Bern, North Carolina. The construction proves more expensive than initially expected, leading the government to increase local taxes. This stirs resentment among some North Carolinians, and helps prolong the War of the Regulation.
- September 29 – The Spanish Empire's Governorate of the Río de la Plata and Governorate of Paraguay begin the process of expulsion of the 456 members of the Society of Jesus (the Jesuits) from southern South America, placing them on five ships bound for Spain.

=== October –December ===
- October 7 – Frederick North, Lord North becomes the new British Chancellor of the Exchequer after the sudden death of Charles Townshend.
- October 9 – Surveying of the "Mason–Dixon line", which will later become the traditional division between the northern and southern states of the United States, is completed by Charles Mason and Jeremiah Dixon after four years, initially to settle a boundary dispute between the colonies of Delaware, Pennsylvania and Maryland. The survey party is halted at Dunkard Creek when a chief of the Mohawk Indians tells them that they are in Native American territory and that the Mohawks guiding the property "would not proceed one step further Westward"; the line, slightly west the 80th meridian west, is now part of the boundary between Pennsylvania and West Virginia.
- October 12 – At the Foundling Hospital in London, Dr. William Watson becomes the first physician to conduct a controlled clinical trial, selecting 32 boys and girls of similar age who have not yet had smallpox. He divides them into three groups in order to test treatments before inoculation for smallpox, with one group receiving a mixture of mercury and jalap, another senna glycoside, and the third getting no pre-treatment at all.
- October 17 – Šćepan Mali, nicknamed "Stephen the Little", is selected as the legislature at Podgorica to be the Tsar of Montenegro, representing "a short but an important break in the succession of the Petrovic dynasty".
- October 24 – In France, several anti-Jewish regulations in place since October 12, 1661, are repealed by the King's Council that advises Louis XV. While Jewish merchants are still prohibited from owning their own retail stores, they are allowed to sell merchandise on credit to gentile merchants at legal interest rates, to legally enforce debts, and to sell jewelry.
- October 28 – A boycott, of 38 types of goods imported from England, is resolved by Boston merchants meeting at Faneuil Hall as a response to the taxes imposed by Great Britain, and one of the first "Buy American" campaigns is started in order to encourage the purchase of items manufactured and produced in the 13 colonies. Copies of the agreement, to be signed by participating merchants, are circulated beyond the Province of Massachusetts Bay to other colonial provinces in New England.
- November 1 – Scottish-born American merchant and shipowner Andrew Sprowle of Portsmouth, Virginia, establishes the Gosport Shipyard on the western shore of the Elizabeth River in the Virginia Colony, on the site of what will eventually become the Norfolk Naval Shipyard.
- November 3 – King Ferdinand IV of the Spanish dominated Kingdom of Naples follows Spain's lead and orders the expulsion of the Jesuits from Naples and has them marched northward to the Neapolitan border with the Papal States.
- November 4 – Francisco de Paula Bucareli, the Governor of Buenos Aires (at the time, a province within the Spanish Empire's Viceroyalty of Peru), hosts the caciques who are the Guarani chiefs of the 30 mission towns established by Jesuit missionaries, in an effort to gain Guarani peoples' support in the expulsion of the Jesuits.
- November 9 – At the new King's College medical school in New York City (later the Columbia University College of Physicians and Surgeons), Dr. John Jones gives the first lecture by a surgical professor in North America.
- November 14 – The Timucua Indian tribe, native to central Florida, becomes extinct with the death of the last speaker of the Timucuan language, Juan Alonso Cabale. Eight years earlier, the last 95 surviving Timucuan people had been forcibly relocated by the Spanish colonial government to Guanabacoa, a township in western Cuba.
- November 19 – Under the coercion of Russian occupation armies, the legislature of Poland follows the wishes of Russian Minister Nicholas Repnin and agrees to allow the kingdom to become a Russian protectorate.
- November 20 – The new American Colonies Act 1766, commonly called the "Declaratory Act", goes into effect, virtually providing for Great Britain's Parliament to govern lawmaking in 13 colonies and exacerbating tensions there.
- November 27 – Oconostota and Attakullakulla, Chiefs of the Cherokee people in the Carolinas, depart from Charleston, South Carolina on a ship voyage to New York City, where they are welcomed by British colonial officials as a prelude to negotiations with Britain's Superintendent of Indian Affairs, Sir William Johnson.
- November 29 – The Archduchess Maria Theresa of Austria, in her capacity as Queen of Hungary, issues an edict against the Romani people (commonly called the "gypsies"), prohibiting them from marrying and calling for gypsy children to be taken away by the government so that they can be brought up by Christian families, a proclamation that "produced little or no effect in comparison with the trouble involved".
- December 2 – Future Pennsylvania chief executive John Dickinson begins publishing his revolutionary "Letters from a Farmer in Pennsylvania" in the Pennsylvania Chronicle.
- December 28 – Phraya Taksin, a minor provincial official in Siam (now Thailand), crowns himself as King of Siam, establishing the Siamese Thonburi Kingdom, taking the regnal name of Borommaracha IV and begins a 14-year reign of liberation and conquest; historically, he is known as "Taksin the Great".
- December 29 – Oconostota and Attakullakulla arrive at Johnstown, New York where they, along with leaders of the Six Nations of the Iroquois Confederacy (the Mohawk, Onondaga, Oneida, Cayuga, Seneca and Tuscarora tribal nations) meet with Sir William Johnson to begin peace negotiations with the British Empire.

== Births ==
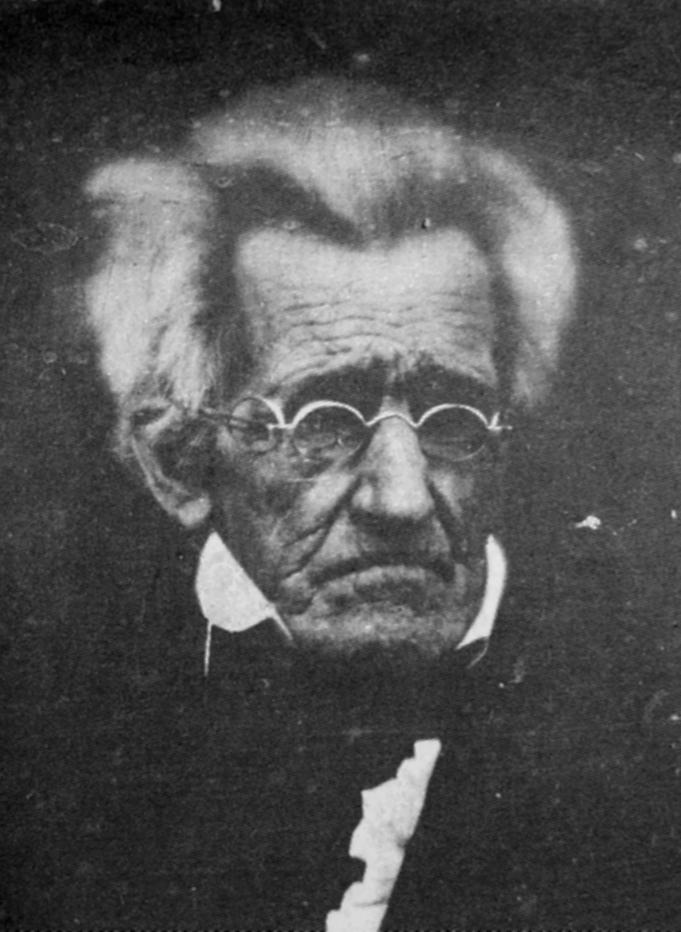
Andrew Jackson

- January 8 – Jean-Baptiste Say, French economist, originator of Say's law (d. 1832)
- January 16 – Cornélie Lebon (née de Brambilla), Belgian born French engineer (d. 1812)
- February 2 – Johann Heinrich Friedrich Link, German naturalist, botanist (d. 1851)

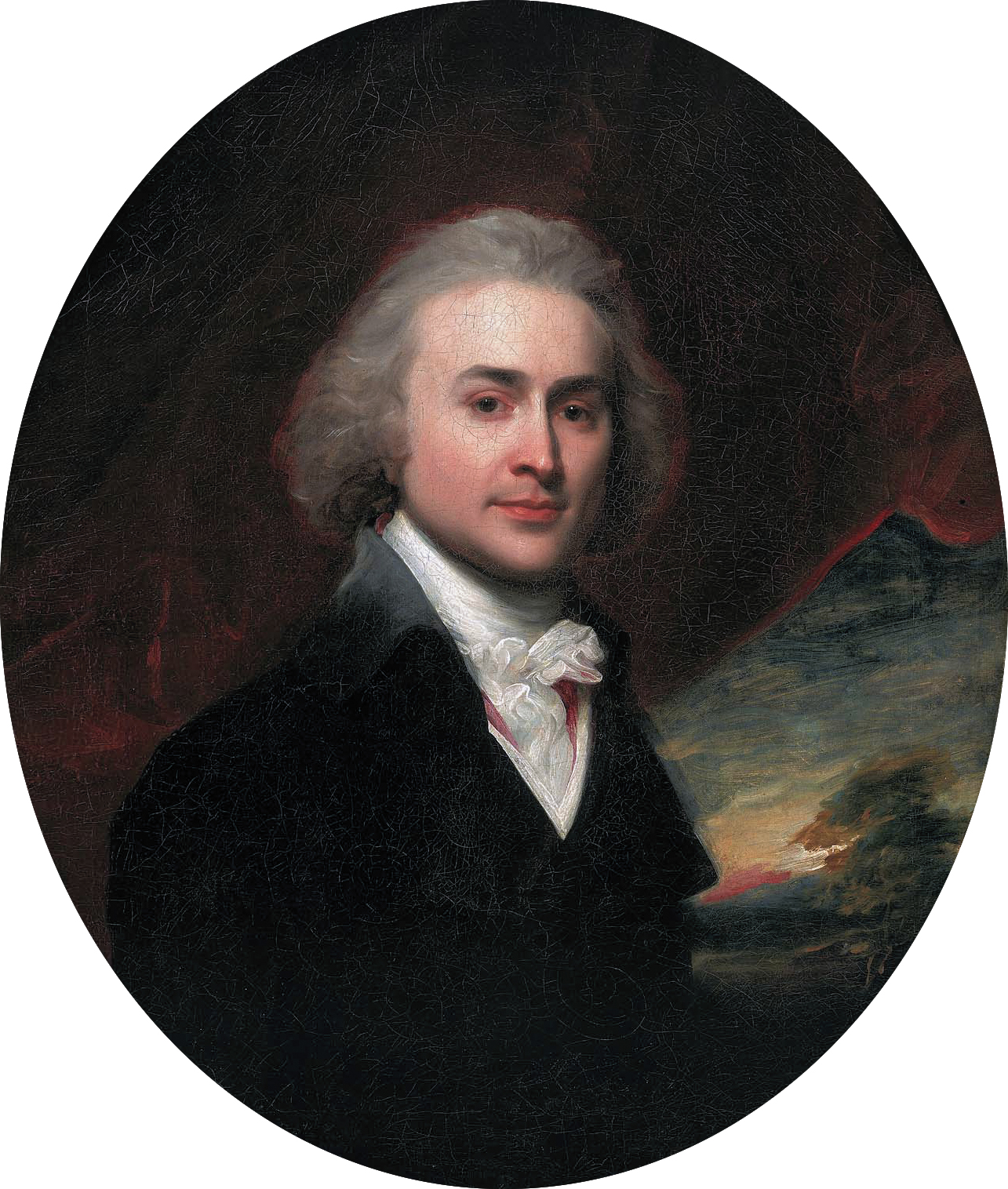
John Quincy Adams

- March 15 – Andrew Jackson, seventh President of the United States (d. 1845)
- March 25 – Joachim Murat, French marshal, King of Naples (d. 1815)
- April 21 – Elisabeth of Württemberg, Archduchess of Austria (d. 1790)
- April 25 – Nicolas Oudinot, French marshal (d. 1847)
- May 4 – Tyagaraja, Indian Carnatic music composer (d. 1847)
- May 12 – Manuel Godoy, Spanish statesman (d. 1851)
- May 13 – John VI of Portugal, King of Portugal (d. 1826)
- June 24 – Jean-Baptiste Benoît Eyriès, French geographer, author and translator (d. 1846)
- July 4 – Kyokutei Bakin, Japanese author (d. 1848)
- July 11 – John Quincy Adams, sixth President of the United States, son of John Adams and Abigail Adams (d. 1848)
- July 28 – James Asheton Bayard Sr., U.S. Senator from Delaware (d. 1815)
- August 24 – Bernhard Meyer, German physician, ornithologist (d. 1836)
- August 25 – Louis Antoine de Saint-Just, French revolutionary (d.1794)
- September 20 – José Maurício Nunes Garcia, Brazilian composer (d. 1830)
- October 25 – Benjamin Constant, Swiss writer (d. 1830)
- November 2 – Prince Edward, Duke of Kent and Strathearn, member of the British Royal Family (d. 1820)
- November 20 – Andreas Hofer, Austrian national hero (d. 1810)
- December 3 – Antoine Fabre d'Olivet, French writer (d. 1825)
- date unknown
  - Black Hawk, Sauk Indian Chief, autobiographer (b. Saukenuk village, now Rock Island, Illinois) (d. 1838)
  - Marianna Malińska, Polish ballerina (d. 1797)

== Deaths ==
- January 7 – Thomas Clap, first president of Yale University (b. 1703)
- January 22 – Johann Gottlob Lehmann, German mineralogist, geologist (b. 1719)
- February 15 – Mikhail Illarionovich Vorontsov, Russian noble, politician (b. 1714)
- March 7 – Jean-Baptiste Le Moyne, Sieur de Bienville, French colonizer and Governor of Louisiana (b. 1680)
- March 13 – Maria Josepha of Saxony, Dauphine of France (b. 1731) (tuberculosis)
- April 5 – Princess Charlotte Wilhelmine of Saxe-Coburg-Saalfeld, countess by marriage of Hanau-Münzenberg (b. 1685)
- April 7 – Franz Sparry, composer (b. 1715)
- May 26 – Prince Frederick Henry of Prussia (b. 1747) (smallpox)
- May 28 – Maria Josepha of Bavaria (b. 1739) (smallpox)
- June 12 – Florida Cevoli, Italian Capuchin Poor Clare and Blessed (b. 1685)
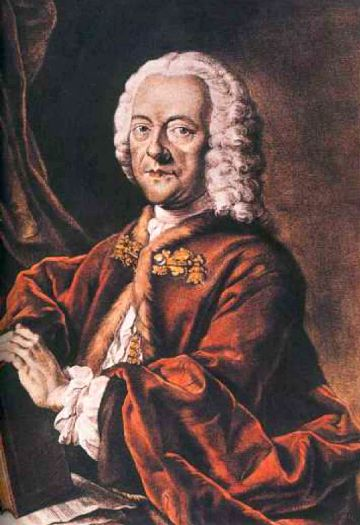
- Georg Philipp Telemann
  June 25 – Georg Philipp Telemann, German composer (b. 1681)
- July 13 – John Quincy, American Soldier (b. 1689)
- July 19 – John Carmichael, 3rd Earl of Hyndford (b. 1701)
- September 4 – Charles Townshend, English politician (b. 1725)
- October 15 – Archduchess Maria Josepha of Austria (b. 1751) (smallpox)
- October 16 – Burkhard Christoph von Münnich, Russian military leader (b. 1683)
- October 26 – Harry Pulteney, British politician (b. 1686)
- November 5 – John Reading (New Jersey governor), Colonial Governor of New Jersey (b. 1686)
- December 1 – Henry Erskine, 10th Earl of Buchan, British Freemason (b. 1710)
- December 22
  - Jacques Bridaine, French Catholic preacher and missionary (b. 1701)
  - John Newbery, English publisher (b. 1713)
- December 28 – Emer de Vattel, Swiss philosopher (b. 1714)
- date unknown
  - Firmin Abauzit, French scientist (b. 1679)
  - Blas María de la Garza Falcón, Spanish settler of Texas (b. 1712)
  - Marie Anne Victoire Pigeon, French mathematician (b. 1724)
  - Ana III of Matamba, African monarch
