= Treaty of Berlin =

Treaty of Berlin may refer to:

- Treaty of Berlin (1715), an alliance between Hanover-Great Britain and Denmark in the Great Northern War
- Treaty of Berlin (1732), between Austria and Prussia, signed but not ratified by Russia
- Treaty of Berlin (1742), between Austria and Prussia
- Treaty of Berlin (1878), which recognized an autonomous Bulgarian principality and the independence of Romania, Serbia and Montenegro from the Ottoman Empire
- Treaty of Berlin (1885), which regulated European colonization and trade in Africa
- Treaty of Berlin (1889), which recognized the independence of Samoa
- Treaty of Berlin (1899), which resulted in the partition of Samoa between Germany and the United States
- Treaty of Berlin (1918), ended World War I between Germany and Finland
- Treaty of Berlin (1921), between the United States and Germany
- Treaty of Berlin (1926), between Germany and the Soviet Union
