= Treaty of Greifswald =

1715 treaty

The Treaty of Greifswald was concluded on 28 October 1715, during the Great Northern War. George I of Great Britain and Elector of Hanover was assured Russian neutrality in his annexation of the Swedish dominion Bremen-Verden, on which he had agreed in the Treaty of Berlin. In turn, George I accepted Russia's annexation of Swedish Ingria, Estonia with Reval and Karelia.
