= Mateo Aimerich =

Spanish philologist (1715–1799)

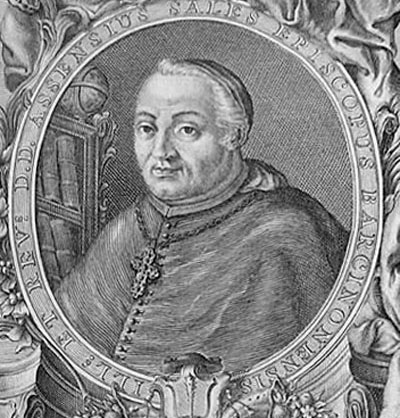
Mateo Aimerich

Mateo Aimerich (1715 – 1799) was a philologist born in Bordils, Province of Girona, Spain.

== Life ==
He entered the Society of Jesus (Jesuits) at eighteen, and later taught philosophy and theology in several Jesuit colleges. He was subsequently rector of Barcelona and Cervera, and chancellor of the University of Gandia. He was in Madrid, supervising the printing of some books, when the decree of the expulsion of the Society from Spain was announced. He moved to Ferrara, Italy where, in exile, he carried out much of his philological work. His only resource was the public library, which his infirmities often prevented him from consulting.

Aimerich died in Ferrara, in 1799.

== Works ==
Besides some works of scholastic philosophy, ascetical works, and discourses, Aimerich wrote:

- Nomina et acta Episcoporum Barcinonencium
- Quinti Moderati Censorini de vitâ et morte linguae Paradoxa philologica, criticis nonnullis dissertationibus opposite, asserta, et probata, of which there were but a few copies printed; the book is consequently very rare.
- a defense of the preceding work;
- Specimen veteris romanae literaturae deperditae vel adhuc latentis;
- Novum Lexicon historicum et criticum antiquae romanae literaturae. This work, which is the sequel to the preceding, was the one which made Aimerich's reputation. He left also an MS., which was a supplement to his dictionary; and a number of Latin discourses.
