= Kościuszko's proclamation =

1794 speech given by Polish revolutionary leader Tadeusz Kościuszko in Kraków

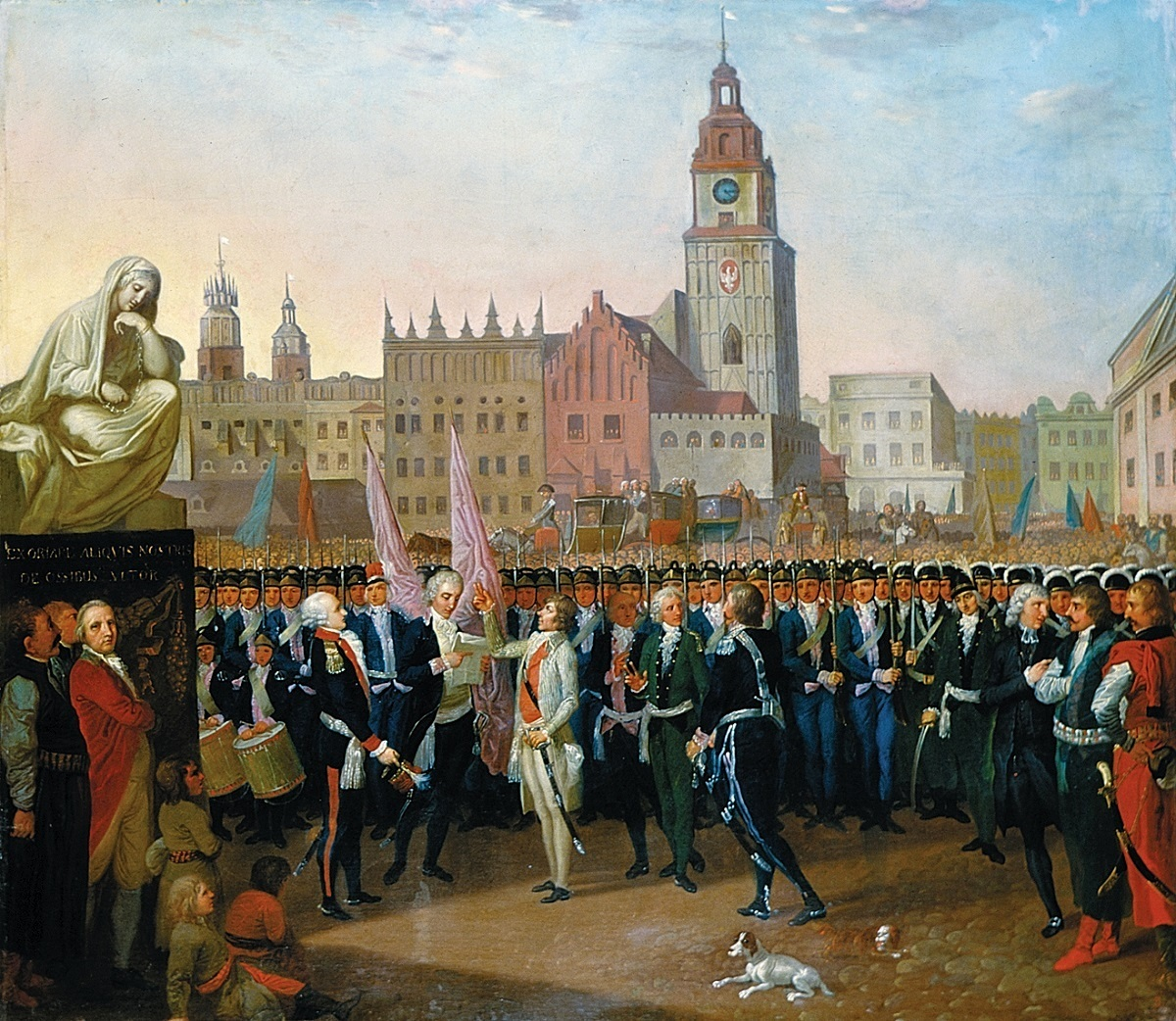
Kościuszko's proclamation depicted in a contemporary painting by Franciszek Smuglewicz.

Kościuszko's proclamation refers to a speech given by Tadeusz Kościuszko in Kraków on 24 March 1794. The speech is considered the starting point of the Kościuszko Uprising against the forces of the Russian Empire that were occupying Poland.

Around 10 o'clock in the Old Town square in Kraków, the Act of Insurrection was read by Kraków's Sejm representative. The document gave Tadeusz Kościuszko command over the National Armed Force (Polish: Siła Zbrojna Narodowa) and he vowed to convene a Supreme National Council. Drafted by Hugo Kołłątaj, an advocate of physiocracy, it began with:

"The wretched state in which Poland finds itself is known to the universe; the indiginities of two neighboring powers, and the crimes of traitors to their country have sunk this nation into an abyss of misery."

Soon afterwards Kościuszko stepped forward and recited his oath:

I, Tadeusz Kościuszko, hereby swear by the God to the entire Polish Nation, that I shall not use the powers vested in me for anyone's oppression, but for defence of the integrity of the borders, recuperation of Nation's sovereignty and strengthening the universal freedom. So help me God and the innocent passion of His Son!

== Aftermath ==
On 10 May, the council was appointed by Kosciuszko, which was led by Kołłątaj as the minister of treasury, Potocki as minister of foreign affairs, and other ministers for justice, security, military needs, provisions, national affairs and administrative affairs. The council coined money with "Freedom, Unity, Independence-The Republic, 1794" on the new zloty.

Kosciuszko stated the council was formed of "...virtuous citizens and friends of the people, and when I nominated them, I did not want to think about whether they are peasants, burghers or aristocrats.".
