= Nicolas Thyrel de Boismont =

French abbot and pulpit orator

Abbé Nicolas Thyrel de Boismont (1715 – 20 December 1786) was a French abbot and a pulpit orator.

He became a cleric in 1730, then in 1744 he was a canon at the Rouen Cathedral. He was elected a member of the Académie Français in 1755.
