= Francesco Puccinotti =

Italian politician

A marble bust of Francesco Puccinotti by Italian sculptor Costantino Lucentini, can be found, among many others of the same style, in the Pincian Hill, in Rome.

Francesco Puccinotti (8 August 1794 – 8 October 1872) was an Italian pathologist.

Puccinotti was born in Urbino and started his career as the main doctor in Recanati but moved on to Macerata where he became the director of the civil hospital. He went on to teach the history of medicine at the universities of Pisa and Florence. He was briefly named to the Italian Senate after the Risorgimento.

Puccinotti wrote an influential history of – his "Storia delle Medicina" (History of Medicine) – and "Patologia induttiva preposta a nuovo organo della scienza medica", an early book on the significance of pathology to medicine. He also did some of the early research into bioelectricity in warm-blooded animals.

Puccinotti died in Florence and was buried in the Basilica of Santa Croce.

== Additional sources ==
- W.F.Bynum and Helen Bynum, Dictionary of medical biography, Greenwood Press, Westport (CT) 2007, vol. 4, p. 1036.
- Norma Olin Ireland, Index to Scientists of the World from Ancient to Modern Times. Boston: F.W. Faxon Co., 1962.
