= John Hustler =

John Hustler (5 October 1715 – 7 November 1790) was a Quaker wool-stapler in Bradford, Yorkshire who was largely responsible at the start of the Industrial Revolution for transforming Bradford from a village to prosperous industrial town. He was the treasurer for the construction of the Leeds and Liverpool Canal and also the chief sponsor of the Bradford Canal.

== Life ==
John Hustler was the eldest son of William Hustler of Steeton (d. 11 May 1759) and Jane Jowet (1685–1745) at Apple Tree Farm, Low Fold, Bolton, near Bradford. His parents were Quakers and he was educated at the Friends' school in Goodmanend, Bradford and after an apprenticeship as a sorter and stapler of wool he joined his father and uncle (John) in the leading merchant business in the town.

By 1752 he gave evidence before a parliamentary committee dealing with the false practices of wool growers and in 1764 was largely responsible for pressing for legislation against closed shop practices of textile workers. In 1777 he was elected chairman of the newly established Yorkshire Worsted Committee acting as a policing agency to prevent fraud and embezzlement in the industry. He proposed the Bradford Piece Hall and was responsible for opening out Bradford centre and was involved with several turnpikes.

In 1766, following a meeting at the Sun Inn, Bradford which launched the idea of a cross-country canal from Leeds to Liverpool, he became the chairman and treasurer of the Bradford committee, writing a pamphlet A Summary View of the Proposed Canal from Leeds to Liverpool in 1770 which helped in the successful bid to bring the canal bill into law and was responsible for much of the fund raising. The next year he also raised support for a branch canal to Bradford which was finished by 1774. He had colliery interests in Bradford and Wigan motivating his efforts.

He married Christiana Hird, a Quaker minister, in 1763 and they had six children, two sons and four daughters. He built Undercliffe House at Eccleshill where he lived for the rest of his life, playing host to itinerant Quaker ministers.
