= Stibo =

Stibo Holding
- Type: Technology
- Founded: 1794
- Headquarters: Aarhus, Denmark
- Number of employees: 1000 employees

Stibo Holding A/S is the modern evolution of Aarhus Stiftsbogtrykkerie which was founded in 1794 by Niels Lund as a printing company. Today, Stibo Software Group provides information management and print technology software. It is headquartered in Aarhus, Denmark.

The company is wholly owned by The Stibo-Foundation. It has three operating subsidiaries: Stibo Systems, Stibo Complete, and Stibo DX. The company operates internationally through its subsidiaries in Europe, North America, and Asia.

== History ==
Stibo was founded in 1794. The company has grown from a traditional local printing house into an international company focusing on graphic processes, production and software.

=== Aarhus Stiftsbogtrykkerie ===
The company was founded in January 1794 as Aarhus Stiftsbogtrykkerie by the 41-year-old printer Niels Lund. The printing company applied for a royal charter with the intention of establishing a diocesan printing house and address office in the town of Aarhus. The charter was to be used for the printing of publications from Lund's own publishing house and any publications others asked him to print. With a royal charter, Lund also sought to publish a weekly newspaper on foreign and domestic news, Royal Decrees, promotions, and any notices and publications Lund was asked to include. On 3 January 1794, the first issue of "The Aarhuus Diocesan Address Office Newspaper, by Royal Charter" was printed.

The Royal Charter meant that Aarhus Stiftsbogtrykkerie was obliged to print various official announcements free of charge. Although this was a financial burden, it kept the wheels of production turning. The printing house produced a regular flow of books and small publications, 136 of which are still in existence today, an estimated half of the total amount produced.

By the 1880s, Aarhus Stiftsbogtrykkerie's annual income from commercial printing was as low as 1,000–1,200 DKK. Niels Lund had died in 1825, and by the 1890s the then 30-year-old Theodor Funch-Thomsen took over management of the company. A turning point came when Danish State Railways became a customer, ordering timetables, traffic lists, posters, brochures, etc. The income from this customer alone amounted to DKK 30.000-40.000 per annum. The newspaper's revenue increased from advertisements and improved numbers of subscriptions. Funch-Thomsen helped grow the number of printing orders each year, increasing from zero in 1890 to 500 in 1909. Aarhuus Stiftsbogtrykkerie made big investments in new technologies, for example when the printing house purchased a 16-page Augsburg web press in 1916.

In 1920, Theodor Funch-Thomsen decided to split the company into two halves, dividing the company between newspaper operations and the printing house.

=== The Kiær family and telephone directories ===
Hans Kiær bought the business in 1927. He undertook a massive new business initiative with, among other things, emphasis on customer service, securing new customers. He also encouraged his son, Erik Kiær, to explore a series of new technologies.

In 1959, JTAS and Aarhuus Stiftsbogtrykkerie signed a contract where the printing company was to produce the four Jutland telephone directories and the Yellow Pages directory. This meant the company purchased new typesetting, new specially-built web presses for telephone directories with various auxiliary machines and a newly established telephone directory printing works with space for rationalized, industrial production. Binding was also no longer required to be outsourced.

In 1959, the printing company bought a section on a new industrial estate in the suburb of Holme, south of Aarhus. They started with 7,500m2. On this site in 1961, the first actual telephone directory printing works was built.

In 1962, the company's total turnover was DKK 8.1 million, of which the telephone directories accounted for DKK 3.2 million. Kiaer and his management secretary, Jørgen Bjerregaard, won yet another lucrative deal in 1964. The deal was to produce every telephone directory in Denmark. This paved the way for the company's involvement in more technology-based operations in the printing and graphics industry.

Since a Yellow Pages directory entails a mass of different types and a wealth of illustrations, Aarhuus Stiftsbogtrykkerie had previously done the typesetting for the Jutland Yellow Pages directory in lead. It worked as long as they were only bound to a single book of a manageable size. But now, with the productions of the KTAS (Copenhagen Telefon A/S) Yellow Pages directory with its 1400 pages, it was quickly seen that using lead would be a hopeless endeavour. Consequently, Erik Kiær chose to use computer-controlled printing.

=== The Stibo Foundation ===
In September 1966, the Aarhuus Stiftsbogtrykkerie Foundation was established and Ingrid and Erik Kiær transferred 99.7% of the shares in the company to the new foundation. Major changes to the company structure were carried out in 2002 and the company name was changed from Aarhuus Stiftsbogtrykkerie to Stibo Group. The foundation which owns Stibo changed its name from Aarhuus Stiftsbogtrykkerie to Stibo-Fonden (English: The Stibo Foundation) in 2007.

In 2006, Stibo Group took over Knowbody ApS. Knowbody developed software directed at automating and optimizing graphic production processes with particular focus on Adobe Systems’ product suite.

== Subsidiaries ==
The Stibo Group operates through three subsidiaries: Stibo Complete, Stibo Systems, and Stibo DX.

=== Stibo Complete ===
In 1990, the subsidiary Stibo Graphic was established in Horsens and 75 million DKK was spent on a large web press: a 48-page "Lithoman" from the Manroland factories. It churned out four-color publications at a speed of 1.3 million pages per hour. Stibo Graphic became responsible for print and electronic publishing sectors within the Stibo Group. In 2015, the company changed its name to Stibo Printing Solutions before adopting its current name, Stibo Complete, in 2018.

=== Stibo Systems ===
In 1976, Stibo Catalog was established with the purpose of serving companies by handling their product information for customers. During the 1980s and 1990s, Stibo Catalog set up regional offices in Great Britain, USA, Singapore and Germany. The new subsidiary was given considerable independence, while the old printing house was kept separate. Stibo Catalog changed its name to Stibo Systems in 2009, shifting its focus towards Master Data Management software.

=== Stibo DX ===
Stibo DX is a Danish software company headquartered in Højbjerg, Aarhus, and part of Stibo Software Group. It develops newsroom software for news media organizations, including publishers and broadcasters. Its principal offering, the Cue media enterprise platform, connects editorial planning, collaboration, content creation, digital asset management, and multichannel delivery.

History

The company was established as CCI Europe in 1979, initially focusing on editorial software for the newspaper industry. In 2013, it acquired the Norwegian content management software company Escenic. The Cue platform was launched in 2016.

In April 2019, the company acquired Digital Collections, a German digital asset management software vendor based in Hamburg. In February 2020, CCI Europe and Escenic were brought together under the Stibo DX brand. Digital Collections adopted the Stibo DX name in January 2021, following the integration of its digital asset management software into the Cue platform.

Software and products

The Cue media enterprise platform is a modular, fully integrated platform for newsroom operations across print and digital channels. It connects editorial planning, collaboration, content creation, digital asset management, and multichannel delivery across brands and newsrooms. The platform supports organizations operating across multiple brands and newsrooms.

The platform includes five main products:

1. Cue Content Store provides content management, story editing, and adaptation of content for multiple formats and distribution channels.
2. Cue Hive supports editorial planning, task coordination, and collaboration, with shared timelines and updates connecting contributors throughout a story’s production.
3. Cue Dam manages digital media assets, including video, audio, graphics, and stories, with search, metadata, rights management, and version control.
4. Cue Autopilot integrates artificial intelligence services into editorial workflows. Its functions include content assistance, metadata generation, workflow orchestration, and preparation of content variants for different channels.
5. Cue Print supports print production, page layout, and automated edition creation using editorial rules and templates. It connects print workflows with the platform’s content management, planning, and asset management products.

Customers

Stibo DX supplies software to news media organizations worldwide. Its customers include The New York Times, Gannett, Axel Springer, The Times of India, and The Economist.

The company has also published case studies documenting use of the Cue platform and its products by Mediahuis, The Globe and Mail, Sanoma, and Swiss broadcaster RSI. These cover editorial workflows, print automation, and digital newsroom operations.

== Works cited ==
- Jørgensen, Jens Christian (1994). A Royal Charter. Aarhuus Stiftsbogtrykkerie. ISBN 87-98-5023-2-8.
