= Antoine-Gabriel-François Benoist =

French soldier

- Born: October 6, 1715
- Died: January 23, 1776 (aged 60)
- Allegiance: France
- Branch: French Army

Antoine-Gabriel-François Benoist (October 6, 1715 – January 23, 1776) was a soldier in the French army who served in important campaigns in North America.

Antoine-Gabriel-François Benoist came to serve in Canada (New France) in 1735. He was with Jean-Baptiste Le Moyne de Bienville in an action against the Chickasaws in 1739. He held an important post as adjutant with François-Pierre de Rigaud de Vaudreuil in 1747. He also served for a period at Fort Saint Frédéric (on Lake Champlain) and as adjutant in Montréal. He undertook recruitment for Canada in France after his promotion to lieutenant.
