= Ahmed al-Ghazzal =

Moroccan writer

Ahmed al-Ghazzal (Arabic: أحمد بن المهدي الغزال) or, in full, Abu l-Abbas Ahmed ibn Al-Mahdi al-Ghazzal al-Andalusi al-Maliqi (died in Fes, 1777) was the secretary of the Moroccan Sultan Mohammed ibn Abdallah (1757–89). Al-Ghazzal is the author of a rihla about his journey to Spain called Natidjat al-iditihad fi l-muhadana wa l-djihad and of a biography of the head of the Isawa religious order, Al-Nur al-Khamil (Mohammed Ben Aissa).
