= John Hicks (Nova Scotia politician) =

Canadian politician

John Hicks (April 23, 1715 – March 6, 1790) was a land agent and political figure in Nova Scotia. He represented Granville Township in the Legislative Assembly of Nova Scotia from 1768 to 1770.

He was born in Portsmouth, Rhode Island, the son of Thomas Hicks and Ann Clarke, who were Quakers. In 1740, he married Elizabeth Russell. Hicks settled in King's County and served as a justice of the peace for Charlestown. In 1759, he travelled to Nova Scotia to investigate the availability of land for settlement there following the expulsion of the Acadians. In 1760, Hicks returned with his family, travelling with a group of Rhode Island planters. He was granted land in Falmouth Township where he served as a justice of the peace. Hicks moved to Granville Township in 1765. He was elected to the assembly in a 1768 by-election held after Henry Munroe resigned his seat. In 1772, he moved to Annapolis Township. Hicks operated a ferry across the Annapolis River between Granville and Annapolis townships. The settlement where he lived was first known as Hicks' Ferry but was later renamed Bridgetown. He died there at the age of 74.

He is an ancestor of the UK TV presenter Richard Madeley - and this family was an episode of the UK Who Do You Think You Are TV Series - Series 8, Episode 8, first aired 28 September 2011.
