= Joseph Allegranza =

Dominican historian, archaeologist

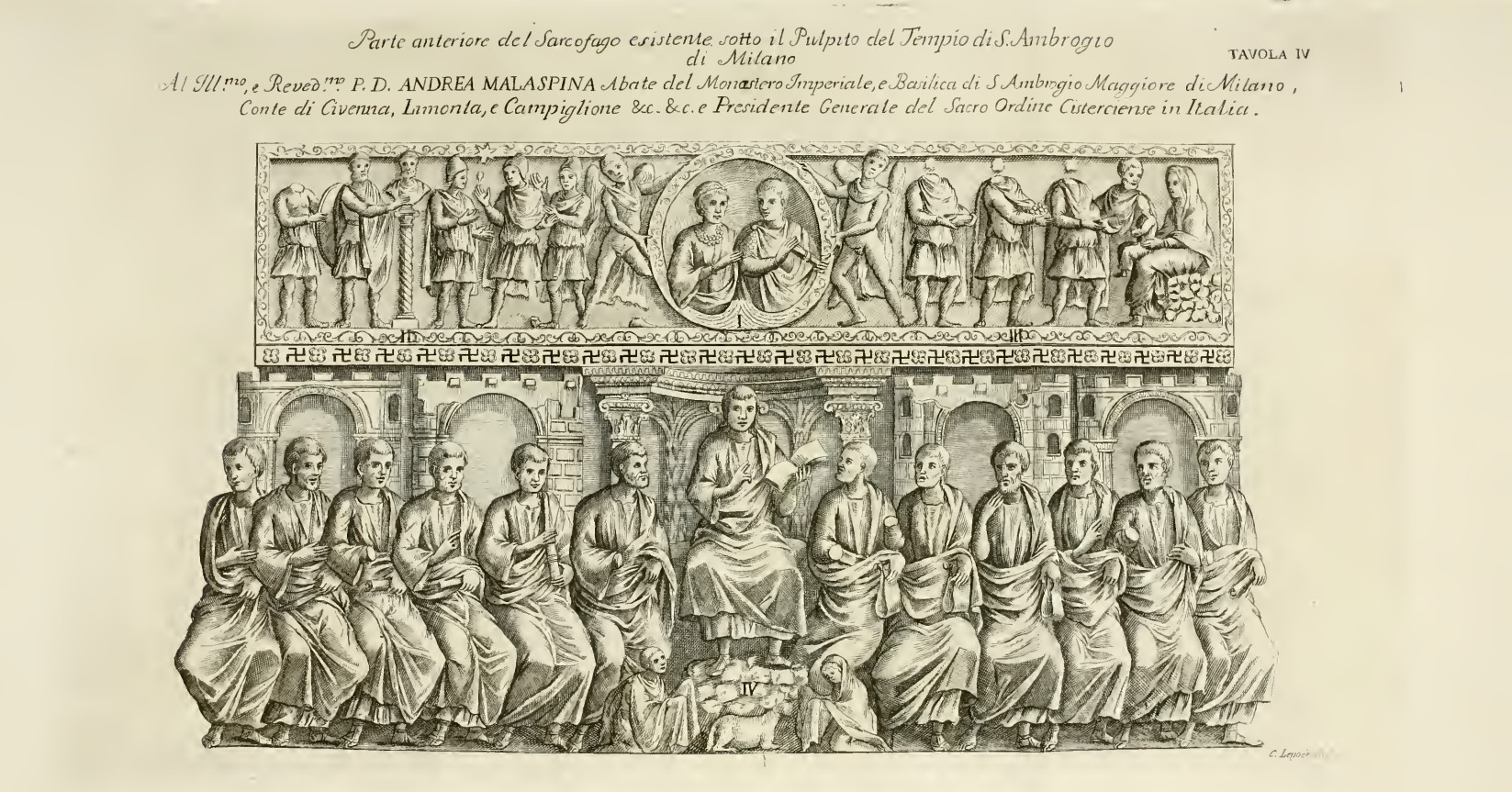
Allegranza's depiction of the anterior of the Basilica of Sant'Ambrogio Milan ca. 1757 in Spiegazioni e riflessioni.

Joseph Allegranza (Italian: Giuseppe; 16 October 1715 in Milan, Duchy of Milan – 18 December 1785 in Milan), pen name sometimes Rosario Maria Eulabio, was a Dominican historian, archaeologist and antiquary known for cataloguing the collection of Count Carlo Pertusati, now the Biblioteca di Brera.

== Biography ==
Joseph Allegranza belonged to the monastery at the Basilica of Sant'Eustorgio and taught theology at Novara and Vercelli in the Kingdom of Sardinia before earning his doctorate in theology in Rome in 1746. He then travelled across Liguria, Piedmont and southern France, and reached Naples by 1750. There, he and Constantino Grimaldi considered a Pansophic library to "administer the most certain and adequate idea of the character, genius, rites and customs of the ancient Nations".

He then visited Sicily and Malta, where he wrote the Philological Letters (Lettere filologiche sopra il Regno di Sicilia e sopra Malta) and then to Chieti, where he taught at the seminary for two years, and Rome for some months between 1754 and 1755, and relocated permanently to Milan in 1755.

In 1770, the Habsburg sovereign Maria Theresa, who controlled Milan as part of the Archduchy of Austria, assigned the literary collection, earlier donated by the State Congregation of Lombardy to her son Archduke Ferdinand Karl, for public use. Likely after this dedication, Allegranza was tasked with cataloguing the collection, for which he received a medal from the Empress; the library would open to the public in 1786.

In 1773 his most famous work De sepulcris christianis in aedibus sacris: accedunt inscriptiones sepulcrales christianae saeculo septimo antiquiores in Insubria Austriaca repertae was published, ably depicting early tombstones and epitaphs from across Italy.

== Selected works ==
- Spiegazioni e riflessioni sopra alcuni sacri monumenti antichi di Milano (Milan, 1757)
- De sepulcris christianis in aedibus sacris. — Accedunt inscriptiones sepulcrales christianae saeculo septimo antiquiores in Insubria Austriaca repertae: item Inscriptiones sepulcrales ecclesiarum atque aedium PP. Ord. Praed. Mediolani (Milan, 1773)
- De Monogrammate D. N. Jesu Christi et usitatis ejus effingendi modis (Milan, 1773)
- Opuscoli eruditi latini ed italiani (Cremona, 1781)
- Osservazioni antiquarie critiche e fisiche fatte nel regno di Sicilia (Milan, 1781)

== Bibliography ==
- Redigonda, A. L. (2003). "Allegranza, Joseph". In Berard Marthalar (ed.). New Catholic Encyclopedia. Vol. 1: A-Azt (2 ed.). Detroit: Thomson-Gale. p. 293.
- Leuzzi, Maria (1960). "ALLEGRANZA, Giuseppe". Dizionario Biografico degli Italiani, Volume 2: Albicante–Ammannati (in Italian). Rome: Istituto dell'Enciclopedia Italiana. ISBN 978-8-81200032-6.
