= Treaty of Berlin (1715) =

1715 alliance between Hanover and Denmark

The Treaty of Berlin was concluded on 2 May 1715, during the Great Northern War. It formalized an alliance between George I of Great Britain (in his role as Elector of Hanover) and Denmark-Norway, in return for the cession of the Swedish dominion of Bremen-Verden to Hanover, which had been occupied by Denmark. With this treaty, Denmark and Hanover joined the Russo-Prussian coalition that had been established by the Treaty of Schwedt. Denmark was assured the gain of yet-to-be-conquered Stralsund.
