= Franz Sparry =

Franz Sparry (28 April 1715 – 7 April 1767; also known as Josef Sparry) was a composer of the Baroque period.

Sparry was born in Graz, and studied at the University of Salzburg before joining the Benedictine order. He subsequently went back to Salzburg to study theology, and began his career as a composer; he wrote a Tafelmusik, his best-known work. From 1747 he was director of music at Kremsmünster Abbey. He died in Kremsmünster.
