= 1650s =

Decade

The 1650s decade ran from January 1, 1650, to December 31, 1659.

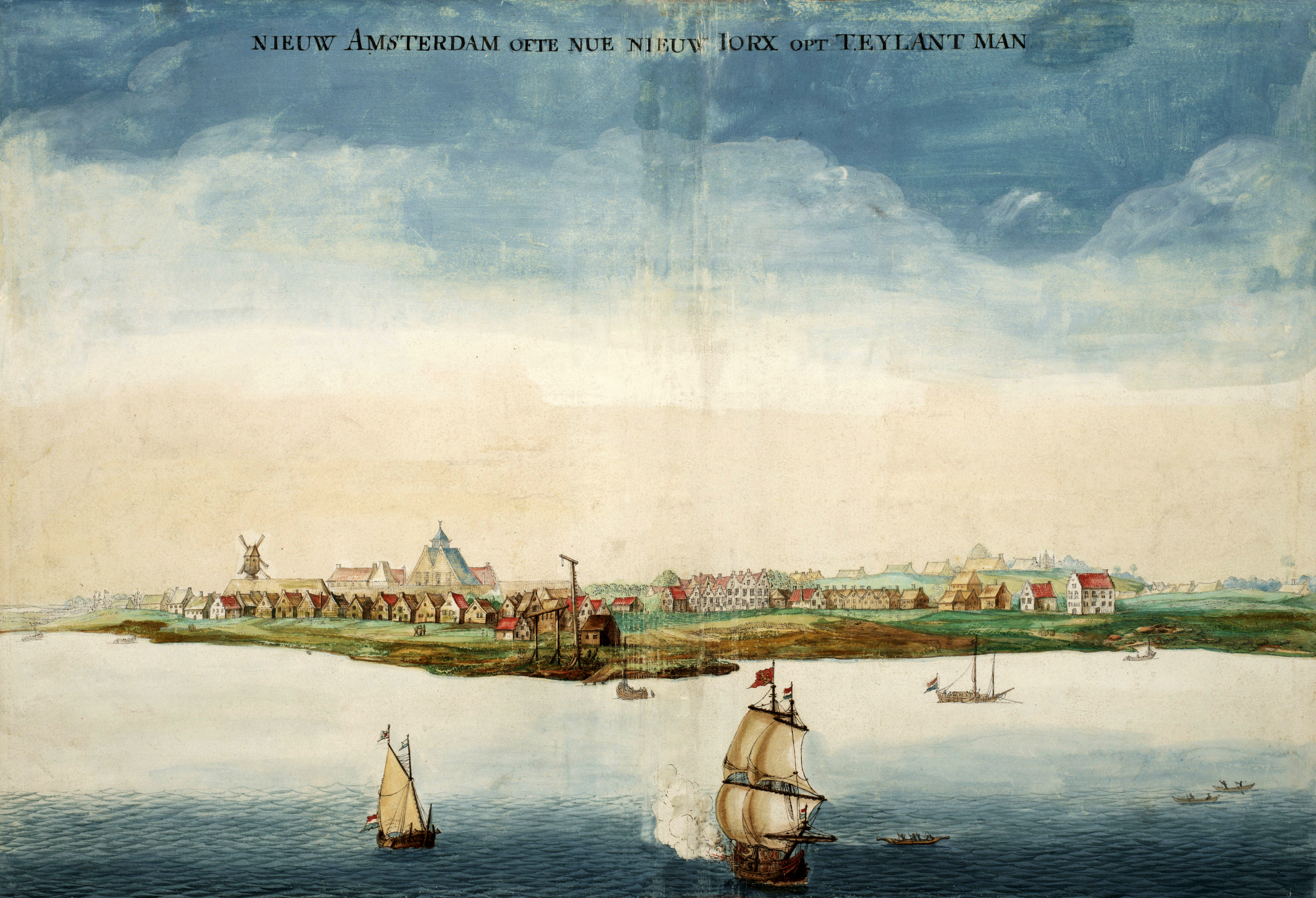
February 2, 1653: New Amsterdam is incorporated.

== Events ==
=== 1650 ===
==== January–March ====
- January 7 – Louis I, Prince of Anhalt-Köthen, dies after a reign of more than 63 years. The area is now part of the northeastern German state of Saxony-Anhalt.
- January 18 – Cardinal Jules Mazarin, the Chief Minister of France and head of its government since 1642, learns of a plot against him and has the Prince de Condé, the Prince de Conti and the Duc de Longueville arrested, prompting a rebellion by parliament against the Crown.
- January 28 – The Sultan bin Saif of Oman expels the Portuguese colonial government from Muscat, forcing the surrender of the port of Muttrah and of Fort Capitan, and captures two warships, ending 35 years of Portuguese occupation.
- February 1 – The French verse play Andromède, commissioned by Cardinal Mazarin, written by Pierre Corneille and with elaborate sets designed by Giacomo Torelli, premieres before the royal family at the Théâtre Royal de Bourbon.
- February 13 – Oliver Cromwell's troops sweep through Ireland and bombard the Kiltinan Castle in County Tipperary.
- February 26 – Jacob van Kittensteyn succeeds Joan Maetsuycker as the Dutch Governor of Zeylan (now the nation of Sri Lanka).
- March 10 – João Rodrigues de Vasconcelos, Portuguese Count of Castelo Melhor, becomes the new Governor of Brazil.
- March 28 – The Siege of Kilkenny in Ireland by Oliver Cromwell ends in after six days as royalist Sir Walter Butler turns over control of the city to the Commonwealth of England forces.

==== April–June ====
- April 27 – The Battle of Carbisdale begins when a Royalist army invades mainland Scotland from the Orkney Islands. The Royalists are defeated by a Covenanter army.
- May 17 – A quarter of the New Model Army at the Siege of Clonmel in Ireland is trapped and killed.
- June 9 – The Harvard Corporation, the more powerful of the two administrative boards of Harvard, is established (the first legal corporation in the Americas).
- June 23 – Claimant King Charles II of England, Scotland and Ireland arrives in Scotland (at Garmouth), the only one of the three kingdoms that has accepted him as ruler.

==== July–September ====
- July 13 – Italian priest and astronomer Gerolamo Sersale of Naples takes advantage of a full moon and draws an extremely detailed lunar map, which is then engraved and reproduced for other astronomers.
- July 22 – Having completed his invasion of Ireland, England's General Oliver Cromwell begins the war against the Kingdom of Scotland, crossing from Northumberland at Berwick-upon-Tweed into Berwickshire, and leads troops toward Edinburgh.
- July 29 – William II, Prince of Orange, stadtholder of Holland, attempts to conquer the rest of the Netherlands and attempts a coup d'état against the Dutch Republic.
- August 13 – Colonel George Monck forms Monck's Regiment of Foot, forerunner of the Coldstream Guards.
- September 3 – Third English Civil War: Battle of Dunbar (1650) – Parliamentarian forces under Oliver Cromwell defeat a Scottish army, commanded by David Leslie.
- September 19 – Treaty of Hartford: the English Commonwealth's Connecticut Colony and the Dutch Republic's colony of New Netherland establish their frontiers in North America.
- September 27 – The Kolumbo volcano on Santorini experiences a massive eruption (VEI 6).
- September 29 – Henry Robinson opens his Office of Addresses and Encounters, a form of employment exchange, in Threadneedle Street, London.

==== October–December ====
- October 17 – The Western Remonstrance is signed by members of the Parliament of Scotland who condemn the recognition of Charles II being crowned King of Scotland, and pledging allegiance to England's General Oliver Cromwell.
- October 20 – Queen Christina of Sweden, who has been the legal ruler of Sweden for almost 18 years, has an elaborate coronation ceremony at the castle of Jacobsdal near Stockholm. The coronation had originally been planned for her 18th birthday in 1644 but was delayed by a war with Denmark-Norway.
- October 30 – The Commonwealth of England government passes a law prohibiting trade between English merchants and English colonies that had sided with Charles II over Oliver Cromwell. Specifically labeled as rebel colonies for purposes of the ban are the North American colonies of Virginia and the Somers Isles (alias Bermuda), as well as the Caribbean islands of Barbados and Antigua.
- November 4 – William III of Orange becomes Prince of the House of Orange at the moment of his birth, succeeding his father, who had died a few days earlier. He does not become stadtholder, so the United Provinces becomes a true republic.
- December 14 – Anne Greene is hanged at Oxford Castle in England for infanticide, having concealed an illegitimate stillbirth. The following day she revives in the dissection room and, being pardoned, lives until 1659.
- December 25 – Thomas Cooper, former Usher of Gresham's School, England, is hanged as a Royalist rebel.

==== Date unknown ====
- The first modern Palio di Siena horserace is held in Italy.
- Puritans chop down the original Glastonbury Thorn in England.
- English highwayman and Captain James Hind campaigns for the Royalist cause (according to his own account).
- Jews are allowed to return to France.
- Three-wheeled wheelchairs are invented in Nuremberg by watchmaker Stephan Farffler.
- Ethiopia deports Portuguese diplomats and missionaries.
- Einkommende Zeitungen becomes the first German daily newspaper (ceases 1918).
- The town of Sharon, Massachusetts is founded.
- Estimation – Istanbul becomes the largest city of the world, taking the lead from Beijing.

=== 1651 ===
==== January–March ====
- January 1 – Charles II is crowned King of Scots at Scone (his first crowning).
- January 24 – Parliament of Boroa in Chile: Spanish and Mapuche authorities meet at Boroa, renewing the fragile peace established at the parliaments of Quillín, in 1641 and 1647.
- February 22 – St. Peter's Flood: A first storm tide in the North Sea strikes the coast of Germany, drowning thousands. The island of Juist is split in half, and the western half of Buise is probably washed away.
- March 4 – St. Peter's Flood: Another storm tide in the North Sea strikes the Netherlands, flooding Amsterdam.
- March 6 – The town of Kajaani is founded by Count Per Brahe the Younger.
- March 15 – Prince Aisin Gioro Fulin attains the age of 13 and becomes the Shunzhi Emperor of China, which had been governed by a regency since the death of his father Hong Taiji in 1643.
- March 26 – The Spanish ship San José, loaded with silver, is pushed south by strong winds; it wrecks on the coast of southern Chile, and its surviving crew is killed by indigenous Cuncos.

==== April–June ====
- April 7 – Shunzhi, Emperor of China, announces in an imperial edict that he will purge corruption from government.
- April 25 – Thomas Hobbes publishes his magnum opus, the political tract Leviathan, in England.
- May 12 – General Marcin Kalinowski of Poland wins the Battle of Kopychyntsi against Zaporozhian Cossacks forces under the command of Asand Demka during the Khmelnytsky Uprising in what is now Ukraine.
- May 21 – The Sovereign Military Order of Malta purchases the Caribbean islands of Saint Barthélemy, Saint Christopher, Saint Croix and Saint Martin from the France's Compagnie des Îles de l'Amérique. The Order will sell the islands in 1665 to the French West India Company.
- June 17 – Franco-Spanish War (1635-1659); A squadron of Spanish galleys under John of Austria the Younger capture the French galleon Lion Couronné off Formentera, Balearic Islands, Spain.
- June 30 – After three days of fighting in the Battle of Berestechko in Ukraine, one of the biggest land battles of the 17th century, with some 205,000 troops in the field, the Polish–Lithuanian Commonwealth Army defeats the Zaporozhian Cossacks.

==== July–September ====
- July 20 – At the Battle of Inverkeithing in Scotland, the English Parliamentarian New Model Army, under Major-General John Lambert, defeats a Scottish Covenanter army acting on behalf of Charles II, led by Sir John Brown of Fordell.
- August 13 – The troops of King Charles II of Scotland force the retreat of English Commonwealth troops at the Battle of Warrington Bridge, the last victory of Scotland over England in battle.
- August 28
  - The "Onfall of Alyth takes place in the Scottish town of the same name when most of the members of Scotland's governing body, the Committee of States, are betrayed to English invaders. The Earl of Leven, the Earl of Crawford, the Earl Marischal, Lord Nairne and other prominent people are captured and imprisoned in the Tower of London.
  - The Battle of Upton is fought at Upton-upon-Severn in England, where Scottish invaders commanded by Major General Edward Massey are defeated by the English Parliamentarians led by John Lambert. The retreat of the Scots clears the way for the successful English attack at Worcester.
- September 1 – The siege of Dundee ends with the English Parliamentarian army, under General Monck, decisively defeating Covenanters in the last battle of the Wars of the Three Kingdoms in Scotland.
- September 2 – Kösem Sultan is assassinated by her daughter-in-law, Turhan Sultan.
- September 3 – Charles II of England, leading a largely-Scottish army, is defeated in the Battle of Worcester, the last major battle of the English Civil War, and forced to flee.

==== October–December ====
- October 14 – Laws are passed in Massachusetts, forbidding poor people from adopting excessive styles of dress.
- October 16 – Prince Charles of the House of Stuart escapes from England to find refuge in France.
- October – An English diplomatic team, headed by Oliver St John, goes to The Hague to negotiate an alliance between the Commonwealth of England and the Dutch Republic.
- November 3 – The Manx Rebellion of 1651 comes to an end as the Countess of Derby surrenders the Isle of Man to the forces of Oliver Cromwell in return for a guarantee of safe passage for herself, her family and her servants, off of the island.
- November 24 – In China, Qing dynasty forces led by Shang Kexi capture the city of Guangzhou from the Southern Ming and then carry out a massacre of the population, killing as many as 70,000 people over 11 days ending on December 5.
- December 17 – Castle Cornet in Guernsey, the last stronghold which had supported the King in the Third English Civil War, surrenders.

==== Date unknown ====
- The Keian Uprising fails in Japan.
- The first coffee house in England is opened in Oxford, indicative of their increasing popularity in Europe.
- The Madanmohan-jiu Temple is built at Samta (India), a village in the Howrah district of West Bengal.

=== 1652 ===
==== January–March ====
- January 8 – Michiel de Ruyter marries the widow Anna van Gelder and plans retirement, but months later becomes a vice-commodore in the First Anglo-Dutch War.
- February 4 – At Edinburgh, the parliamentary commissioners of the Commonwealth of England proclaim the Tender of Union to be in force in Scotland, annexing the Scottish nation with the concession that Scotland would have 30 representatives in the parliament of the English Commonwealth.
- February 12 – Oliver Cromwell, England's Lord Protector, announces that his Council of Scotland will regulate church affairs as part of the Terms of Incorporation of Scotland into England, and eliminates Presbyterianism as Scotland's state religion.
- March 29 (April 8 New Style) – Total solar eclipse of April 8, 1652 ("Black Monday").

==== April–June ====
- April 6 – Dutch sailor Jan van Riebeeck establishes a resupply camp for the Dutch East India Company at the Cape of Good Hope in modern-day South Africa, thus founding Cape Town.
- May 18 – Rhode Island passes the first law in North America making slavery illegal.
- May 19 (May 29, New Style) – First Anglo-Dutch War: Battle of Dover – The opening battle is fought off Dover between Lt.-Admiral Maarten Tromp's 42 Dutch ships and 21 English ships divided into two squadrons, one commanded by Robert Blake and the other by Nehemiah Bourne; the result is inconclusive.
- June 13 – George Fox preaches to a large crowd on Firbank Fell in England, leading to the establishment of the Religious Society of Friends (Quakers).

==== July–September ====
- July 2 – The Battle of the Faubourg St Antoine is fought east of Paris between French Parliamentarians (led by Louis, Grand Condé) against the army of King Louis XIV, commanded by the Viscount of Turenne, with neither side prevailing.
- July 4 – A mob kills 150 people, including judges, in the massacre at the Hôtel de Ville, Paris.
- July 5 – The 1652 Articles of Peace and Friendship are signed between the Province of Maryland and the Conestoga Indians, ceding most of the land around the Chesapeake Bay to the English colonists.
- July 10 – The First Anglo-Dutch War begins formally as the English Commonwealth declares war against the Dutch Republic.
- July 17 – The "Great Fire of Glasgow" destroys one-third of the Scottish city.
- August 26 – First Anglo-Dutch War: Battle of Plymouth – A fleet from the Commonwealth of England attacks an outward-bound convoy of the Dutch Republic, escorted by 23 men-of-war and six fire ships, commanded by Vice-Commodore Michiel de Ruyter; the Dutch escape.
- September 11 – The Guo Huaiyi Rebellion, a peasant revolt on the island of Taiwan against colonial rule in Dutch Formosa, is suppressed after four days.

==== October–December ====
- October 2 – The Great Fire of Oulu destroys almost all of the houses of the town’s bourgeoisie, the provision warehouses and the drawbridge of Oulu Castle, in the town of Oulu, Finland.
- October 8 – First Anglo-Dutch War: Battle of the Kentish Knock – In a battle fought near the shoal called the Kentish Knock in the North Sea, about 30 km (19 mi) from the mouth of the River Thames, the Dutch are forced to withdraw.
- November 30 – The Netherlands takes control of the English Channel after the Battle of Dungeness ends in a Dutch victory over the English Royal Navy.
- December 10 – First Anglo-Dutch War: Defeat at the Battle of Dungeness causes the Commonwealth of England to reform its navy.

=== 1653 ===
==== January–March ====
- January 3 – By the Coonan Cross Oath, the Eastern Church in India cuts itself off from colonial Portuguese tutelage.
- January – The Swiss Peasant War begins after magistrates meeting at Lucerne refuse to hear from a group of peasants who have been financially hurt by the devaluation of the currency issued from Bern.
- February 2 – New Amsterdam (now New York City) received municipal rights by a charter from New Netherland Governor Peter Stuyvesant.
- February 3 – Cardinal Mazarin returns to Paris from exile.
- February 10 – Swiss peasant war of 1653: Peasants from the Entlebuch valley in Switzerland assemble at Heiligkreuz to organize a plan to suspend all tax payments to the authorities in the canton of Lucerne, after having been snubbed at a magisterial meeting in Lucerne. More communities in the canton join in an alliance concluded at Wolhusen on February 26.
- February – The Morning Star Rebellion (Morgonstjärneupproret) of peasants breaks out in Sweden's province of Närke, against Queen Christina. It is brutally suppressed by April, and its leader, the self-proclaimed King Olof Mårtensson (who uses a morning star as his scepter) is executed on a breaking wheel on April 6.
- March 14 – A Dutch fleet defeats the English in the Battle of Leghorn in the Mediterranean but the Dutch commander, Johan van Galen, later dies of his wounds.

==== April–June ====
- April 20 – Oliver Cromwell expels the Rump Parliament in England.
- April 28 – The Great Fire of Marlborough destroys 224 houses and much of the textile businesses in the Wiltshire town which, "at that date was one of considerable importance, and had merchants of affluence and repute."
- May 31 – Ferdinand IV, already the King of Bohemia, Hungary and Croatia, is elected King of the Romans by his fellow German monarchs, making him eligible to succeed his father Ferdinand III as Holy Roman Emperor. Ferdinand IV will not live to become Holy Roman Emperor, instead dying from smallpox 14 months after his designation.
- June 13 – First Anglo-Dutch War: The English navy defeats the Dutch fleet in the Battle of the Gabbard after a two-day fight.
- June 20 – The Swiss peasant war of 1653 ends after Swiss Army troops under the command of Sebastian Peregrin Zwyer suppress the last rebels in Switzerland's Entlebuch Valley.

==== July–September ====
- July 4 – Barebone's Parliament, named for a prominent Puritan member, Praise-God Barebone, opens its session in London with elected representatives to pass laws for the Commonwealth of England.
- July 8 – John Thurloe becomes Cromwell's head of intelligence.
- August 5 – Frederick William, Elector of Brandenburg reaffirms the nobility's freedom from taxation, and its unlimited control over the peasants, in return for a grant to him of 530,000 silver Joachimsthalers to be paid in installments over six years.
- August 8 – The petite post, a system of postage using prepaid labels and post boxes, is inaugurated in Paris by Jean-Jacques Renouard de Villayer for the mailing of letters within the city, an event noted by Madeleine de Scudéry in her manuscript Chroniques du samedi.
- August 10 – The Battle of Scheveningen, the final naval battle of the First Anglo-Dutch War, ends after three days of fighting off the island of Texel, as the English Navy gains a tactical victory over the Dutch fleet.
- September 13 – A violent storm off the west coast of Scotland sinks the English Navy warship Swan, and the commandeered merchantmen Speedwell and Martha and Margaret, all of which have been anchored off of Mull. Most of the crews had gone ashore, but 23 of the men on the ship Speedwell are killed.
- September 29 – In India, the third and final attempt by the Mughal Empire, to recapture the city of Kandahar from the Safavid Empire, ends in failure after almost six months despite the presence of 70,000 Mughal soldiers under the command of Prince Dara Shukoh.

==== October–December ====
- October 11 (October 1 O.S.) – The Zemsky Sobor, the Russian Empire's national assembly, opens its session to declare a war against the Kingdom of Poland.
- October 20 – The Battle of Bordeaux is fought between French and Spanish warships in the Gironde estuary of France as part of the Franco-Spanish War. The Spanish fleet of 30 warships, under the command of Álvaro de Bazán y Manrique de Lara, Marquis of Santa Cruz, overwhelms the French fleet of César, Duke of Vendôme and captures ten galleys and brigantines, as well as burning four other warships and 15 barges.
- October 25 – Erdeni Bumba, the wife and chief consort of China's Shunzhi Emperor, is demoted from being the empress to being a concubine.
- October 29 – Pierre-Esprit Radisson, a French Canadian teenager who had been captured by a Mohawk raiding party two years earlier and then tortured, escapes captivity in what is now the U.S. state of New York.
- November 8 – The Battle of Arronches takes place near the town of Arronches on the Portuguese side of the border between Portugal and Spain, with the Portuguese Army outflanking and defeating a larger Spanish force.
- November 16 – The Krishnanattam, a series of eight dance dramas written by Mana Veda, Zamorin of Calicut in India to tell the epic of the Hindu god Krishna, is completed.
- November 30 – Jacques Dyel du Parquet completes his installment payments, totaling 41,500 French livres, to become the exclusive owner of the Caribbean islands of Martinique, Grenada, Saint Lucia and the Grenadines.
- November – John Casor, a servant of African descent in Northampton County of the colony of Virginia, leaves Anthony Johnson's farm, after claiming his contract of indenture had expired, and goes to work for a new employer, Robert Parker. Johnson sues Parker, claiming that Casor is a slave for life, rather than an indentured servant, and the court issues a landmark ruling on March 8, 1655, establishing African-Americans as property.
- December 7 – The Moti Masjid, an Islamic mosque made completely of white marble and within the walls of the Agra Fort in what is now the city of Agra in the Indian state of Uttar Pradesh, is dedicated by the Mughal Emperor, Shah Jahan, on 16 Muharram 1064.
- December 12 – The dissolution of Barebone's Parliament is voted by its members after having passed laws for the Commonwealth of England.
- December 16 – The Instrument of Government in England becomes Britain's first written constitution, under which Oliver Cromwell becomes Lord Protector of England, Scotland, and Ireland, being advised by a remodelled English Council of State. This is the start of The First Protectorate, bringing an end to the first period of republican government in the country, the Commonwealth of England.

==== Date unknown ====
- Marcello Malpighi, an Italian pioneer of microscopical anatomy becomes a doctor of medicine.
- Stephen Bachiler, a clergyman and early advocate for the separation of church and state returns to England after having spent more than 20 years overseas in the Massachusetts Bay Colony.
- The gardens surrounding the Taj Mahal mausoleum are completed at Agra.

=== 1654 ===
==== January–March ====
- January 6 – In India, Jaswant Singh of Marwar (in the modern-day state of Rajasthan) is elevated to the title of Maharaja by Emperor Shah Jahan.
- January 11 – Arauco War – Battle of Río Bueno in southern Chile: Indigenous Huilliche warriors rout Spanish troops from Fort Nacimiento, who are attempting to cross the Bueno River.
- January 26 – Portugal recaptures the South American city of Recife from the Netherlands after a siege of more than two years during the Dutch-Portuguese War, bringing an end to Dutch rule of what is now Brazil. The Dutch West India Company has held the city (which they call Mauritsstad) for more than 23 years.
- February 9 – Spanish troops led by Don Gabriel de Rojas y Figueroa succeed in the capture of Fort Rocher, a pirate-controlled base on the Caribbean island of Tortuga.
- February 10 – The Battle of Tullich takes place in Aberdeenshire in Scotland during Glencairn's rising, a revolt by Scottish royalists against the Commonwealth of England, Scotland and Ireland led by Lord Protector Oliver Cromwell. The battle is indecisive.
- March 13 – The Treaty of Pereyaslav is concluded in the city of Pereyaslav during a meeting between the Cossacks of the Zaporozhian Host and Tsar Alexey I of Russia following the end to the Khmelnytsky Uprising in Ukraine, which started in 1648 and has resulted in the massacre of many thousands of Jews.

==== April–June ====
- April 5 – The Treaty of Westminster, ending the First Anglo-Dutch War, is signed.
- April 11 – A commercial treaty between England and Sweden is signed.
- April 12 – Oliver Cromwell creates a union between England and Scotland, with Scottish representation in the Parliament of England.
- May 5 – Cromwell's Act of Grace, officially the Act of Pardon and Grace to the People of Scotland, is proclaimed at the Mercat Cross in Edinburgh.
- May 8 – Otto von Guericke demonstrates the power of atmospheric pressure and the effectiveness of his vacuum pump, using the Magdeburg hemispheres, before Ferdinand III, Holy Roman Emperor, and the Imperial Diet in Regensburg.
- June 3 – Louis XIV of France is crowned at Reims.
- June 16 (June 6 Old Style) – Charles X Gustav succeeds his cousin Christina on the Swedish throne. After her abdication on the same day, Christina, now the former reigning queen of a Protestant nation, secretly converts to Catholicism.

==== July–September ====
- July 5 – The Russian Army camps outside Smolensk and the Thirteen Years' War starts between Russia and Poland over Ukraine.
- July 10
  - Peter Vowell and John Gerard are executed in London for plotting to assassinate Oliver Cromwell.
  - Don Pantaleon, brother of the Portuguese ambassador to England, is executed after the death of an innocent man following a fracas at the exchange in Exeter.
- August 12 – The Battle of Shklow, one of the first clashes of the Russo-Polish War, takes place at the modern-day Belarusan town of Škłoŭ during a total eclipse of the Sun visible over Eastern Europe. The Russian troops retreat.
- August 18 – Oliver Cromwell launches the Western Design with the appointment of Admiral William Penn to prepare for a fleet to leave on Christmas Day for an English expedition to the Caribbean to counter Spanish commercial interests, effectively beginning the Anglo-Spanish War (which will last until after the English Restoration in 1660). The fleet leaves Portsmouth in late December.
- August 22 – Jewish arrival in New Amsterdam: 23 Sephardic Jews arrive as refugees from Brazil and settle in New Amsterdam, forming the nucleus of what will be the second largest urban Jewish community in history, that of New York City, and of Congregation Shearith Israel, the first synagogue in North America.
- August 25 – Russia routs the Polish Army in the Battle of Shepeleviche.
- September 3 – In England, the First Protectorate Parliament assembles.
- September 12 – Oliver Cromwell orders the exclusion of 120 members of Parliament who are hostile to him.
- September 23 – Smolensk falls to the Russian Army after almost three months.

==== October –December ====
- October 12 – The Delft Explosion, in the arsenal, devastates the city in the Netherlands, killing more than 100, among whom is Carel Fabritius (32), the most promising student of Rembrandt.
- October 31 – Ferdinand Maria, Elector of Bavaria, is crowned. His absolutist style of leadership becomes a benchmark for the rest of Germany.
- November 23 – French mathematician, scientist and religious philosopher Blaise Pascal experiences an intense mystical vision that marks him for life.
- December 11 – Sir William Petty wins the contract from the Commonwealth of England to make a survey of Ireland.
- December 14 – Jerónimo de Ataíde, Count of Atouguia, becomes Portugal's new Governor-General of Brazil, succeeding João Rodrigues de Vasconcelos e Sousa.
- December 25 – An English Navy fleet of 17 warships and 20 transports, carrying 325 cannons, 1,145 seamen, and 1,830 troops, under the command of Admiral William Penn departs from Portsmouth to begin Oliver Cromwell's planned surprise attack on Spain's colonies in the New World.

=== 1655 ===
==== January–March ====
- January 5 – Emperor Go-Sai ascends to the throne of Japan.
- January 7 – Pope Innocent X, leader of the Roman Catholic Church and the Papal States, dies after more than 10 years of rule.
- February 14 – The Mapuches launch coordinated attacks against the Spanish in Chile, beginning the Mapuche uprising of 1655.
- February 16 – Dutch Grand Pensionary advisor Johan de Witt marries Wendela Bicker.
- March 8 – John Casor becomes the first legally recognized slave in what will become the United States, as a court in Northampton County in the Colony of Virginia issues its decision in the Casor lawsuit, the first instance of a judicial determination in the Thirteen Colonies holding that a person who has committed no crime could be held in servitude for life.
- March 25 – Saturn's largest moon, Titan, is discovered by Christiaan Huygens.

==== April–June ====
- April 4 – Battle of Porto Farina, Tunis: English admiral Robert Blake's fleet defeats the Barbary pirates.
- April 7 – Pope Alexander VII (born Fabio Chigi) succeeds Pope Innocent X, as the 237th pope.
- April 24 – The Piedmontese Easter Massacre of the Waldensians: Charles Emmanuel II, Duke of Savoy slaughters 1,500 men, women and children; this is memorialized in John Milton's sonnet "On the Late Massacre in Piedmont" and apologized for by Pope Francis in 2015.
- April 26 – The Dutch West India Company denies Peter Stuyvesant's request to exclude Jews from New Amsterdam (Manhattan).
- April 28 – Admiral Blake severely damages the arsenal of the Bey of Tunis.
- May 10–27 – Anglo-Spanish War: Invasion of Jamaica – Forces of the English Protectorate led by William Penn and Robert Venables capture the island of Jamaica from Spain.
- June 13 – Adriana Nooseman-van de Bergh becomes the first actress, in Amsterdam theater.

==== July–September ====
- July 20 – The Amsterdam Town Hall (the modern-day Royal Palace) is inaugurated.
- July 27
  - The Jews in New Amsterdam petition for a separate Jewish cemetery.
  - The Netherlands and Brandenburg sign a military treaty.
- July 30 – Dutch troops capture Fort Assahudi Seram.
- July 31 – Russo-Polish War (1654–67): The Russian army enters the capital of the Grand Duchy of Lithuania, Vilnius, which it holds for 6 years.
- August 9 – Lord Protector Oliver Cromwell divides England into 11 districts, under major-generals.
- August 28 – New Amsterdam and Peter Stuyvesant bar colonial Jews from military service.
- August – The governor of New Netherland, Peter Stuyvesant, attacks the New Sweden (Delaware) colony.
- September 8 – Swedish King Karl X Gustav occupies Warsaw (Poland).
- September 26 – Peter Stuyvesant recaptures the Dutch Fory Casimir, and defeats the New Sweden (Delaware) colony.

==== October –December ====
- October 15 – The Jews of Lublin are massacred.
- October 19 – Swedish King Karl X Gustav occupies Kraków (Poland).
- November 3 – England and France sign military and economic treaties.
- November 24 – English Lord Protector Oliver Cromwell announces measures against the Laudian party, which are enforced starting on January 1.
- December 4 – Middelburg, the Netherlands forbids the building of a synagogue.
- December 18 – The Whitehall Conference ends with the determination that there is no law preventing Jews from re-entering England after the Edict of Expulsion of 1290.
- December 27 – Second Northern War/the Deluge: Monks at the Jasna Góra Monastery in Częstochowa are successful in fending off a month-long siege.

==== Date unknown ====
- Stephan Farffler, a 22-year-old paraplegic watchmaker, builds the world's first self-propelling chair on a three-wheel chassis using a system of cranks and cogwheels. However, the device has the appearance of a hand bike more than a wheelchair since the design includes hand cranks mounted at the front wheel.
- The Bibliotheca Thysiana is erected, the only surviving 17th century example in the Netherlands, of a building designed as a library.
- 1655 Malta plague outbreak kills 20 people.
- Frederick III of Denmark-Norway gives control of the Faroe Islands to Christoffer Gabel and his son, which will last until 1709.

=== 1656 ===
==== January–March ====
- January 5 – The First War of Villmergen, a civil war in the Confederation of Switzerland pitting its Protestant and Roman Catholic cantons against each other, breaks out but is resolved by March 7. The Lutheran cantons of the larger cities of Zurich, Bern and Schaffhausen battle against seven Catholic cantons of Lucerne, Schwyz, Uri, Zug, Baden Unterwalden (now Obwalden and Nidwalden) and St. Gallen.
- January 17 – The Treaty of Königsberg is signed, establishing an alliance between Charles X Gustav of Sweden and Frederick William, Elector of Brandenburg.
- January 24 – The first Jewish doctor in the Thirteen Colonies of America, Jacob Lumbrozo, arrives in Maryland.
- January 20 – Reinforced by soldiers dispatched by the Viceroy of Peru, Spanish Chilean troops defeat the indigenous Mapuche warriors in a battle at San Fabián de Conuco in what is now central Chile, turning the tide in the Spanish colonists favor in the Mapuche uprising after more than a year.
- February 18 (February 8 O.S.) – Battle of Golab: Swedish Empire troops led by King Carl X Gustav defeat troops of the Polish–Lithuanian Commonwealth commanded by General Stefan Czarniecki in the first major engagement of the Swedish Deluge.
- February 23 – London's Lord Mayor Christopher Packe suggests to Oliver Cromwell, the Lord Protector and chief executive of the Commonwealth of England, Scotland and Ireland, that the monarchy should be restored with Cromwell as its King. Cromwell declines to become King Oliver, but his right to name his successor becomes effective on May 25, 1657 with the commencement of the Humble Petition and Advice.
- February 26 – A rebellion of Turkish soldiers, leading to the "Çınar incident", takes place after a palace guard for Ottoman Sultan Mehmet IV turns away a representative group who had come for payment for their services during the war in Crete. The rebellion ends with the mass killing 30 men identified by the rebels as being responsible for the non-payment.
- March 3 – Fyodor Baykov, the Russian Empire's first envoy to China, is admitted to the Forbidden City within Beijing, after being sent by Tsar Alexis to negotiate a trade agreement with the Emperor Shunzi.
- March 4 – The "Çınar incident", named for the Turkish word for the sycamore tree takes place after Ottoman Sultan Mehmet IV declines the request of soldiers to have 30 named government officials put to death. When Mehmet agrees only to dismiss the people from office, the rebels seek out the men on the list and publicly hang most of them from the cinar trees.
- March 5 – Zurnazen Mustafa Pasha is appointed as the Grand Vizier of the Ottoman Empire after persuading Mehmet IV to rescind the February 28 selection of Gazi Hüseyin Pasha. Zurnazen Mustafa's rule lasts only four hours and he is sent into exile the same day.
- March 7 – The First War of Villmergen in the Confederation of Switzerland ends with a peace agreement, mediated by France and the Duchy of Savoy, between the Protestant and Roman Catholic cantons.
- March 15 – Battle of Jaroslaw: Almost a month after their defeat by Sweden at the Battle of Golab, Polish and Lithuanian troops commanded by Stefan Czarniecki defeat King Karl X Gustav's Swedish Army.
- March 23 – Roman Catholic Pope Alexander VII issues a decree ending the Chinese Rites controversy between Jesuit missionaries (who tolerate the rites as compatible with Catholicism) and Dominican and Franciscan missionaries (who consider the Chinese rituals incompatible). The Pope rules that practices ""favorable to Chinese customs", including Confucianism and ancestor worship, can be accepted as compatible with Catholic rites.

==== April–June ====
- April 1 – John II Casimir Vasa, King of Poland, crowns the Black Madonna of Częstochowa as Queen and Protector of Poland in the cathedral of Lwów, after the miraculous saving of the Jasna Góra Monastery during the Deluge, an event which changed the course of the Second Northern War. The King swears a vow, the Lwów Oath, pledging to protect Poland's people from being conquered again.
- April 2 – The Treaty of Brussels is signed, creating an alliance between Philip IV of Spain and the exiled Royalists of the British Isles, led by Charles II.
- April 28 – The Dutch East India Company ship Vergulde Draeck, with 193 crew aboard and a valuable cargo is wrecked off Ledge Point, Western Australia, with the loss of 118 members. Another 75 make it to shore, with limited provisions. The ship had been bound from the Cape of Good Hope to Batavia in the Dutch East Indies (now Jakarta in Indonesia).
- May 7 – Nine days after the wreck of the Vergulde Draeck, a steersman and six crew members are dispatched to Batavia to get help. The other 68 survivors remain at Ledge Point and await rescue but are not seen again.
- May 12 – The Dutch capture the city of Colombo, Sri Lanka, marking the start of Netherlands colonial rule of Dutch Ceylon.
- May 17 – In elections by the nobility of Venice for the Leader of the Venetian Republic, Francesco Cornaro defeats Bertuccio Valier. Cornaro dies less than three weeks later, on June 5.
- June 15 – Bertuccio Valier is elected as the new Doge of the Venetian Republic in Venice.
- June 16 – After a 41-day voyage, the seven-member team dispatched from the Vergulde Draeck reaches Batavia and alerts Dutch East India Company officials that the ship was wrecked on April 28. Two rescue ships, the Goede Hoop and the Witte Valck are sent to rescue the men marooned in Western Australia. By the time the Goede Hoop arrives, the crew find no sign of the wreckage of the Vergulde Draeck.
- June 21 – Poland's capital, Warsaw, is recaptured by Poland's John II Casimir Vasa 11 months after the capital had fallen on July 25, 1655 to Sweden.
- June 27 – The Navy of the Ottoman Empire suffers a major defeat after two days of fighting against the navies of the Republic of Venice and of Malta in the Battle of the Dardanelles, one of the Turkish straits that connects the Black Sea to the Mediterranean Sea. Out of 98 Ottoman Turkish ships under the command of Kenan Pasha, 82 are either captured or destroyed. Venice loses only three of its ships, but its commander, Admiral Lorenzo Marcello, is killed by a direct cannon hit to his flagship.
- June 29 – The Treaty of Marienburg is signed by representatives of Sweden and of Brandenburg and Prussia to create a military alliance during the Second Northern War. King Karl X Gustav signs for Sweden and the Elector Friedrich Wilhelm signs for Brandenburg and Prussia.

==== July–September ====
- July 18 – In an attempt to find survivors of the Vergulde Draeck, a search party is sent ashore by the rescue ship Goede Hoop; eleven men from two search parties while in the forests around the wreckage site. No trace of the Vergulde Draeck will be found for more than three centuries, until its wreckage is discovered by skin divers on April 13, 1963.
- July 27 – A Writ of Excommunication is issued against Baruch Spinoza.
- July 30 – After a battle of three days, Swedish and Brandenburger troops led by King Charles X Gustav of Sweden, defeat the forces of the Polish–Lithuanian Commonwealth, near Warsaw and recapture the recently liberated capital.
- August 8 – In the Ayutthaya Kingdom, comprising most of the territory now occupied by Thailand, King Prasat Thong dies after a reign of more than 25 years. His eldest son, Prince Chao Fa Chai, is crowned as King Sanpet VI but Prasat's brother plots the new king's overthrow.
- August 9 – King Sanpet's uncle, Prince Si Suthammaracha, stages a coup d'etat and becomes the new King of Ayutthaya, now Thailand. Suthammaracha appoints another nephew, Prince Narai, as his chief minister and former King Sanpet is executed two days later on August 11. Suthammaracha's reign lasts less than three months.
- August 14 – In one of the first battles of the Russo-Swedish War, Russian troops capture the Swedish-controlled city of Kokenhusen in Swedish Livonia (Latvia). Tsar Alexis, ruler of the Russian Empire and the leader of the Russian troops in battle, renames Kokenhausen "Tsarevich-Dmitriev" in honor of his late first-born son. Russia holds the city for more than 30 years before it is ceded back to Sweden. Kokenhusen is now the Latvian town of Koknese.
- August 27 – The Treaty of Butre is signed in West Africa by representatives of the Dutch West India Company and of the Ahanta Kingdom and allows the Netherlands to have a protectorate over the Dutch Gold Coast. The area is now part of the Republic of Ghana.
- September 15 – Köprülü Mehmed Pasha becomes Grand Vizier of the Ottoman Empire.

==== October–December ====
- October 26 – King Si Suthammaracha of Ayutthaya (now Thailand) is overthrown in a coup d'etat by his nephew and former ally, Prince Narai, 11 weeks after having staged a coup to seize the throne. Narai is crowned as King Ramathibodi III.
- November 3 – The Truce of Vilna is signed between Russia and the Polish–Lithuanian Commonwealth. In addition to agreeing to a temporary ceasefire in their ongoing war, Tsar Alexis of Russia agrees to help defend the commonwealth against Sweden's invasion in return for Tsar Alexis being named heir to the thrones of Poland and Lithuania by King John II Casimir Vasa.
- November 4 – Ali Adil Shah II becomes the new Sultan of Bijapur (located in what is now India's Karnataka state) upon the death of his father, Mohammed Adil Shah.
- November 6 – At the age of 13, Prince Afonso, Duke of Braganza becomes the new King of Portugal upon the death of his father, King João IV. Because of his age and a mental disability King Afonso VI's authority is exercised instead by his mother, Queen Luisa, as Regent.
- November 20 – The Treaty of Labiau is signed, between Charles X Gustav of Sweden and Frederick William, Elector of Brandenburg.
- December 1 – A treaty of alliance is signed between the Holy Roman Empire and the Polish–Lithuanian Commonwealth.
- December 6 – The Treaty of Radnot is signed between Sweden, the Electorate of Brandenburg, Transylvania (now Romania), and two rebels groups within Poland on how to divide the Polish–Lithuanian Commonwealth in the event of a victory in the Second Northern War.
- December 16 – English Quaker James Nayler is convicted of blasphemy but spared the death penalty.
- December 17 – King Frederick III of Denmark and Norway decrees that loan repayments and payments of interest to lenders will be made on two specific days, May 29 and June 11, each one nicknamed the Fandens fødselsdag or "Devil's Birthday",
- December 25 – The pendulum clock is invented by Christiaan Huygens, so accurate that it only loses 10 seconds per day. Huygens will mention the date in a letter to Ismail Boulliau a year later.

==== Undated ====
- The Stockholm Banco, the first bank to issue banknotes, is founded in Stockholm, Sweden.
- The only English fifty shilling coin is minted.
- Konoike Zen'amon (son of Konoike Shinroku) founds a baking and money-changing business in Osaka, Japan.
- Adams' Grammar School at Newport, Shropshire, England is founded by William Adams.
- Physician Samuel Stockhausen of the metal mining town of Goslar, Lower Saxony publishes his Libellus de lithargyrii fumo noxio morbifico, ejusque metallico frequentiori morbo vulgò dicto die Hütten Katze oder Hütten Rauch ("Treatise on the Noxious Fumes of Litharge, Diseases caused by them and Miners' Asthma"), a pioneering study of occupational disease.

=== 1657 ===
==== January–March ====
- January 8 – Miles Sindercombe and his group of disaffected Levellers are betrayed in their attempt to assassinate Oliver Cromwell by blowing up the Palace of Whitehall in London and are arrested.
- January 29 – Rule of the Major-Generals (regional military government) in England is abolished.
- February 4 – Resettlement of the Jews in England: Oliver Cromwell gives Antonio Fernandez Carvajal the assurance of the right of Jews to remain in England.
- February 23 – In England, the Humble Petition and Advice offers Lord Protector Cromwell the crown.
- March 2 – The Great Fire of Meireki in Edo, Japan, destroys most of the city and damages Edo Castle, killing an estimated 100,000 people.
- March 23 – Anglo-Spanish War (1654–60): By the Treaty of Paris, France and England form an alliance against Spain; England will receive Dunkirk.

==== April–June ====
- April 20
  - Anglo-Spanish War – Battle of Santa Cruz de Tenerife: English Admiral Robert Blake attempts to seize a Spanish treasure fleet.
  - The Jews of New Amsterdam (later New York City) are granted freedom of religion, as full citizens.
- May 8 – Lord Protector Cromwell confirms his refusal of the crown of England, preferring the title "Lord Protector".
- June 1
  - King Frederick III of Denmark signs a manifesto, de facto declaring war on Sweden.
  - The first eleven Quaker settlers arrive in New Amsterdam (later New York City), and are allowed to practice their faith.

==== July–September ====
- July 13 – Following his refusal to take the oath of allegiance to Oliver Cromwell, English army leader John Lambert is ordered to resign his commissions.
- August 20 – The ship Les Armes d'Amsterdam arrives at Quebec, New France. Among the passengers is Michel Mathieu Brunet dit Lestang (1638–1708), colonist, explorer and co-discoverer of modern-day Green Bay, Wisconsin, and ancestor of the Brunet, Lestang and Carisse families of North America.
- September 19 – Brandenburg and Poland sign the Treaty of Wehlau.
- September 24 – The first autopsy and coroner's jury verdict in the Colony of Maryland are recorded.
- September – Shah Jahan becomes ill, allowing his son to take control of the Mughal Empire.

==== October–December ====
- October 1 – Treaty of Raalte: William III, Prince of Orange is no longer stadtholder of Overijssel.
- October 3 – French troops occupy Mardyck.
- November 6 – Brandenburg and Poland sign the Treaty of Bromberg.
- November 10 – Christina, former Queen regnant of Sweden, has Gian Rinaldo Monaldeschi killed in her presence, at the Palace of Fontainebleau.
- December 27 – The Flushing Remonstrance is signed in New Amsterdam, at the site of the future (1862) Flushing Town Hall in New York City.

==== Date unknown ====
- The Accademia del Cimento is founded in Florence, Italy.
- England's first chocolate house is opened in London and introduction of tea in England while coffee is introduced to France.
- Christiaan Huygens writes the first book to be published on probability theory, De ratiociniis in ludo aleae ("On Reasoning in Games of Chance").
- Andreas Gryphius' drama Katharina von Georgien is published in Breslau.
- Thomas Middleton's tragedy Women Beware Women (c. 1623–24) is published posthumously in London.

=== 1658 ===
==== January–March ====
- January 13 – Edward Sexby, who had plotted against Oliver Cromwell, dies in the Tower of London.
- January 30 – The "March Across the Belts" (Tåget över Bält), Sweden's use of winter weather to send troops across the waters of the Danish straits at a time when winter has turned them to ice, begins. Within 17 days, Sweden's King Karl X Gustav leads troops across the ice belts to capture six of Denmark's islands as Swedish territory.
- February 5 – Prince Muhi al-Din Muhammad, one of the sons of India's Mughal, Emperor Shah Jahan, proclaims himself Emperor after Jahan names Muhi's older brother, Dara Shikoh, as regent, and departs from Aurangabad with troops.
- February 6 – Swedish troops of Charles X Gustav of Sweden cross The Great Belt in Denmark, over frozen sea.
- March 8 (February 26 OS) – The peace between Sweden and Denmark-Norway is concluded in Roskilde by the Treaty of Roskilde, under which Denmark is forced to cede significant territory. This leads to Sweden reaching its territorial height during its time as a great power.

==== April–June ====
- April 15 – In India, the Battle of Dharmat is fought in the modern-day state of Madhya Pradesh between rival claimants to the throne of the Mughal Empire. Prince Muhi al-Din Muhammad, the son of the Emperor Shah Jahan, leads 30,000 men in a triumph over 22,000 troops led by Jaswant Singh of Marwar and Ratan Singh Rathore. Despite heavy losses, with more than 11,000 casualties, Prince Muhi, who has adopted the name Aurangzeb, continues toward Samugarh and Agra and captures the throne at the end of July.
- April 16 – In Skåneland, a region recently ceded by Denmark to the Swedish Empire, representatives of the nobility of the provinces of Blekinge, Halland and Scania gather at the Scanian city of Malmö to swear their allegiance to King Charles X Gustav of Sweden.
- May 1 – Hydriotaphia, Urn Burial and The Garden of Cyrus are published by Thomas Browne in England.
- May 29 – Aurangzeb wins the Battle of Samugarh as Indian Mughal regent Dara Shikoh makes a last effort to defend the Mughal capital Agra.
- June 3 – Pope Alexander VII appoints François de Laval vicar apostolic of New France.
- June 14 – Anglo-Spanish War (1654–60) and Franco-Spanish War (1635–59): In the Battle of the Dunes, a Spanish force attempting to lift a siege of Dunkirk is defeated by the French and English. England is then given Dunkirk, for its assistance in the victory.
- June 25–27 – In the Battle of Rio Nuevo, part of the Anglo-Spanish War, a Spanish invasion force fails to recapture Jamaica from the English.

==== July–September ====
- July 2 – The Siege of Toruń begins in Poland as troops of the Polish–Lithuanian Commonwealth and of Austria seek to recapture the city of Toruń from a garrison of the Swedish Army. Within six months, the Swedish occupiers surrender.
- July 18 – Prince Leopold of the House of Habsburg, son of the late Ferdinand III, is elected as the new Holy Roman Emperor.
- July 31 – After Shah Jahan completes the Taj Mahal, his son Aurangzeb deposes him as ruler of the Mughal Empire.
- July – Šarhūda's Manchu fleet annihilates Onufriy Stepanov's Russian flotilla, on the Amur River.
- August 1 – The coronation of Leopold I takes place in Frankfurt.
- August 5 – Just six months after winning territory from Denmark-Norway in war and subsequent treaty, Sweden's King Charles X Gustav declares a second war against Denmark. By August 11, the King's troops have surrounded Denmark's capital, Copenhagen, while the Swedish Navy blocks the harbor to prevent the city from being resupplied, and begins bombardment.
- August 14 – The League of the Rhine (Rheinische Allianz) is formed by 50 German princes whose cities are on the Rhine river.
- September 3 – Oliver Cromwell dies and his son Richard assumes his father's position as Lord Protector of England, Scotland and Ireland.
- September 17 – Portuguese Restoration War: In the Battle of Vilanova, a Spanish army, having crossed the Minho, defeats the Portuguese.

==== October–December ====
- October 7 – The Netherlands enters the Dano-Swedish War to come to the rescue of Denmark, sending a 45-ship fleet from Vlie.
- October 29 – The 45-ship fleet of the Netherlands arrives at Denmark and begins its counterattack on Sweden's army and navy with three squadrons.
- November 6 – The Mexican Inquisition carries out the execution, by public burning, of 14 men convicted of homosexuality, while another 109 arrested are either released or given less harsh sentences.
- November 8 (October 29 old style) – The Battle of the Sound takes place between the navies of the Dutch Republic (with 41 warships) and of Sweden (with 45) at the Øresund, a strait between Denmark and Sweden's newly-acquired territory, the former Danish island of Scania. The Dutch Republic is successful at breaking the Swedish Navy's blockade of Copenhagen, and Sweden is forced to retreat, bringing an end to the attempted conquest of Denmark.
- November 23 – The elaborate funeral of Lord Protector of England Oliver Cromwell (who had died on September 3 and was buried at Westminster Abbey two weeks later) is carried out in London. A little more than two years later (in January 1661), his body will be disinterred and his head severed and placed on a spike.
- December 11 – Abaza Hasan Pasha, an Ottoman provincial governor who is attempting to depose the Grand Vizier, wins a battle at the Turkish city of Ilgin, defeating loyalist forces led by Murtaza Pasha. The victory is the last for the rebels. Two months later (February 16, 1659) Abaza Hasan is assassinated after being invited to peace negotiations by the loyalists.
- December 20 – Representatives of the Russian Empire and the Swedish Empire sign the Treaty of Valiesar at the Valiesar Estate near Narva, part of modern-day Estonia. In return for ceasing hostilities between the two empires in the Second Northern War, Russia is allowed to keep captured territories in Livonia (part of modern-day Latvia) for a term of three years.
- December 25 – Polish and Danish forces defeat a Swedish Army in the Battle of Kolding in Denmark.
- December 30 – The Siege of Toruń ends almost six months after it started, with Poland recapturing the city from Sweden.

==== Date unknown ====
- Portuguese traders are expelled from Ceylon by Dutch invaders.
- The Dutch in the Cape Colony start to import slaves from India and South-East Asia (later from Madagascar).

=== 1659 ===
==== January–March ====
- January 14 – In the Battle of the Lines of Elvas, fought near the small city of Elvas in Portugal during the Portuguese Restoration War, the Spanish Army under the command of Luis Méndez de Haro suffers heavy casualties, with over 11,000 of its nearly 16,000 soldiers killed, wounded or taken prisoner; the smaller Portuguese force of 10,500 troops, commanded by André de Albuquerque Ribafria (who is killed in the battle) suffers less than 900 casualties.
- January 24 – Pierre Corneille's Oedipe premieres in Paris.
- January 27 – The third and final session of the Parliament of the Commonwealth of England, Scotland and Ireland is opened by Lord Protector Richard Cromwell, with Chaloner Chute as the Speaker of the House of Commons, with 567 members. "Cromwell's Other House", which replaces the House of Lords during the last years of the Protectorate, opens on the same day, with Richard Cromwell as its speaker.
- January 31 – Giovanna De Grandis is arrested in Rome and charged with trafficking the lethal Aqua Tofana poison. On February 2, she implicates the mastermind of the poisoners, Gironima Spana, starting the case of the Spana Prosecution that eventually leads to the arrest and trial of 40 people.
- February 2 – Jan van Riebeeck produces the first South African wine, at the Cape of Good Hope.
- February 11 – The Assault on Copenhagen by Swedish forces is beaten back, with heavy losses.
- February 16 – The first known cheque (400 pounds) is written.
- March 1 – In exile in the Netherlands while plotting the restoration of the monarchy to England, Scotland and Ireland, Charles, son of the late King Charles I appoints seven royalists (including six from the "Sealed Knot" group) to a "Great Trust and Commission" to make plans for a post-restoration government. The Great Trust is led by Charles's trusted advisor, Edward Hyde.
- March 9 – Sir Lislebone Long is elected as the Speaker of the House of Commons by the Third Protectorate Parliament after Chaloner Chute becomes seriously ill. Long serves only six days before dying on March 16. Chute remains Speaker but dies on April 14 and is replaced by Thomas Bampfield.
- March 11 – Prince Dara Shikoh, who had been the heir apparent to the throne of the Mughal Empire in India until the overthrow of his father, Shah Jahan, makes a stand near Ajmer to fight the armies sent by Mughal Emperor Aurangzeb, but loses and is forced to flee.
- March 28 – The Danish Africa Company (Dansk afrikanske kompagni) is chartered to Hendrik Carloff for the purpose of capturing Africa slaves from the area around Denmark's colony on the Danish Gold Coast for use in the West Indies.

==== April–June ====
- April 22 – Under pressure from the English Army in London, which has assembled troops outside of Westminster, Richard Cromwell, Lord Protector of England, Scotland and Ireland, dissolves the Third Protectorate Parliament, the last for the Commonwealth.
- May 6 – English Army General Hezekiah Haynes, joined by officers Charles Fleetwood, John Lambert, James Berry, Robert Lilburne, Thomas Kelsey, William Goffe and William Packer, presents the manifesto A Declaration of the Officers of the Army, advocating that Lord Protector Cromwell step down after restoring the "Rump Parliament" to administer England. Cromwell restores the parliament rule the next day and decides to step down.
- May 21 – The Kingdom of France, the Commonwealth of England and the Dutch Republic sign the Concert of The Hague, agreeing a common stance on the Second Northern War.
- May 25 – Richard Cromwell resigns as English Lord Protector, submitting "a letter that may have been dictated to him." In the letter, signed by Cromwell in front of Sir Gilbert Pickering and Lord Chief-Justice St. John, "I have perused the Resolve and Declaration, which you were pleased to deliver to me the other Night," and after listing his personal debts to be paid in return for stepping down, "As to that Part of the Resolve, whereby the Committee are to inform themselves, How far I do acquiesce in the Government of this Commonwealth, as it is declared by this Parliament; I trust, my past Carriage hitherto hath manifested my Acquiescence in the Will and Disposition of God; and that I love and value the Peace of this Commonwealth much above my own Concernments: And I desire, that by this, a Measure of my future Deportment may be taken; which, thro' the Assistance of God, shall be such as shall bear the same Witness; having, I hope, in some degree, learned rather to reverence and submit to the Hand of God, than to be unquiet under it: And, as to the late Providences that have fallen out amongst us, however, in respect of the particular Engagements that lay upon me, I could not be active in making a Change in the Government of these Nations, yet through the Goodness of God, I can freely acquiesce in it, being made; and do hold myself obliged." The executive government is replaced by the restored Council of State, dominated by Generals John Lambert, Charles Fleetwood and John Desborough. The Council of State is dismissed by the Rump Parliament on October 13 and replaced by the "Committee of Safety" on October 25.
- June 10 – Dara Shikoh, at one time the heir apparent for the Mughal Empire, is betrayed by an Afghan chieftain, Junaid Khan Barozai, who had initially given him refuge from pursuit from the new emperor, Aurangzeb. Turned over to Aurangzeb's men, Dara Shikoh is killed on August 30.
- June 29 – In the Battle of Konotop, fought near the Ukrainian city of Konotop during the Russo-Polish War, Polish Cossack hetman Ivan Vyhovsky and his allies defeat the armies of the Tsardom of Russia, led by Aleksey Trubetskoy.

==== July–September ====
- July 5 – Five women are executed by hanging at Rome after being convicted of murder in the Spana Prosecution by distributing the powerful Aqua Tofana poison, sold primarily to women wishing to get rid of their husbands. Put to death on the same day are Gironima Spana, Giovanna De Grandis, Maria Spinola, Graziosa Farina and Laura Crispoldi, in the public square at the Campo de' Fiori.
- July 16 – Princess Henriette Catherine of Nassau marries John George II, Prince of Anhalt-Dessau, in Groningen.
- July 31 – Dodda Kempadevaraja (Devaraja Wodeyar I) becomes the new maharaja of the Kingdom of Mysore (part of modern-day India's Karnataka state) upon the death of his cousin, Kanthirava Narasaraja I. He is crowned on August 19.
- July – Christiaan Huygens's important work on astronomy, Systema Saturnium, is published.
- August 3 – Booth's Uprising, led by George Booth, begins in the city of Chester as 3,000 royalists attempt a revolt against the military government of England. English Army troops begin marching on August 5 to suppress the rebellion.
- August 7 – As Booth's Uprising spreads to Liverpool, Thomas Myddelton, Randolph Egerton and fellow royalists take control of the town of Wrexham in Wales and proclaim Charles II to be King.
- August 15 – Two English warships block the entrance to the River Dee to prevent supplies from reaching Booth's rebels in Chester, while Major General John Lambert of the English Army advances into Cheshire at Nantwich.
- August 19 – At the Battle of Winnington Bridge, the Protectorate Army of 5,000 troops, dispatched by Parliament and under the command of Major General Lambert, routs the 4,000 anti-government rebels commanded by George Booth of England and Edward Broughton of Wales. Lambert and his forces, exhausted from their rapid march and the battle, elect not to pursue the fleeing rebels and less than 30 rebels are killed.
- August 30 – Poland's army of over 12,000 troops under the command of Jerzy Sebastian Lubomirski and Krzysztof Grodzicki, takes back the city of Grudziadz, which has been under Sweden's control since the end of 1655, after a siege of seven days. Much of the town is left in ruins after a fire and bombardment from Polish cannons.
- September 20 – War between Dutch settlers and the native Lenape Indians, of the Esopus tribe, in modern-day Ulster County, New York, in the U.S., as a group of Dutch settlers from the village of Wiltwijck, New Netherland fires their guns at a group of Esopus men who have been sitting around a campfire. For the next ten months, the Esopus warriors, commanded by Chief Papequanaehen, fight a war with the Dutch that is finally settled with a peace treaty on July 15, 1660.
- September 22 – The Ottoman-ruled island of Kizilhisar (called Castelrosso by Italy and in modern times the island of Kastellorizo in Greece) is captured from the Ottoman Empire by the navy of the Republic of Venice after nearly 150 years of Ottoman rule that had started in 1512.
- September 30 – Peter Stuyvesant of New Netherland forbids tennis playing during religious services, marking the first mention of tennis in what will become the United States.

==== October–December ====
- October 12 – The English Rump Parliament dismisses John Lambert, and other generals.
- October 13 – General-major John Lambert drives out the English Rump-government.
- November 7 – The Treaty of the Pyrenees is signed by representatives of King Louis XIV of France and King Philip IV of Spain. Spain agrees to French acquisition of the counties of Roussillon and Upper Cerdanya (Principality of Catalonia) and most of Artois, formally ending the 24-year-long Franco-Spanish War.
- November 25 – Dutch forces under Michiel de Ruyter free the Danish city of Nyborg from Swedish conquest that had taken place earlier in the year.
- December 16 – General George Monck demands free parliamentary elections in Scotland and resolves to overthrow the military government that has ruled the British Isles since 1648.
- December 26 – The Long Parliament reforms occur in Westminster.

==== Date unknown ====
- First British colonists arrive on Saint Helena.
- Spanish Infanta Maria Theresa brings cocoa to Paris.
- Diego Velázquez's portrait of Infanta Maria Theresa is first exhibited.
- Thomas Hobbes publishes De Homine.
- Parisian police raid a monastery, sending monks to prison for eating meat and drinking wine during Lent.
- Drought occurs in India.
- Peter Swink, the first known non-white settler to own land in Massachusetts, and first known African to live in Springfield, Massachusetts, arrives. He holds a seat in the town meetings.

== Births ==
1650

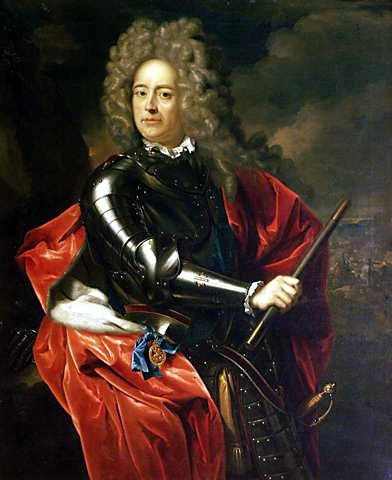
John Churchill, 1st Duke of Marlborough

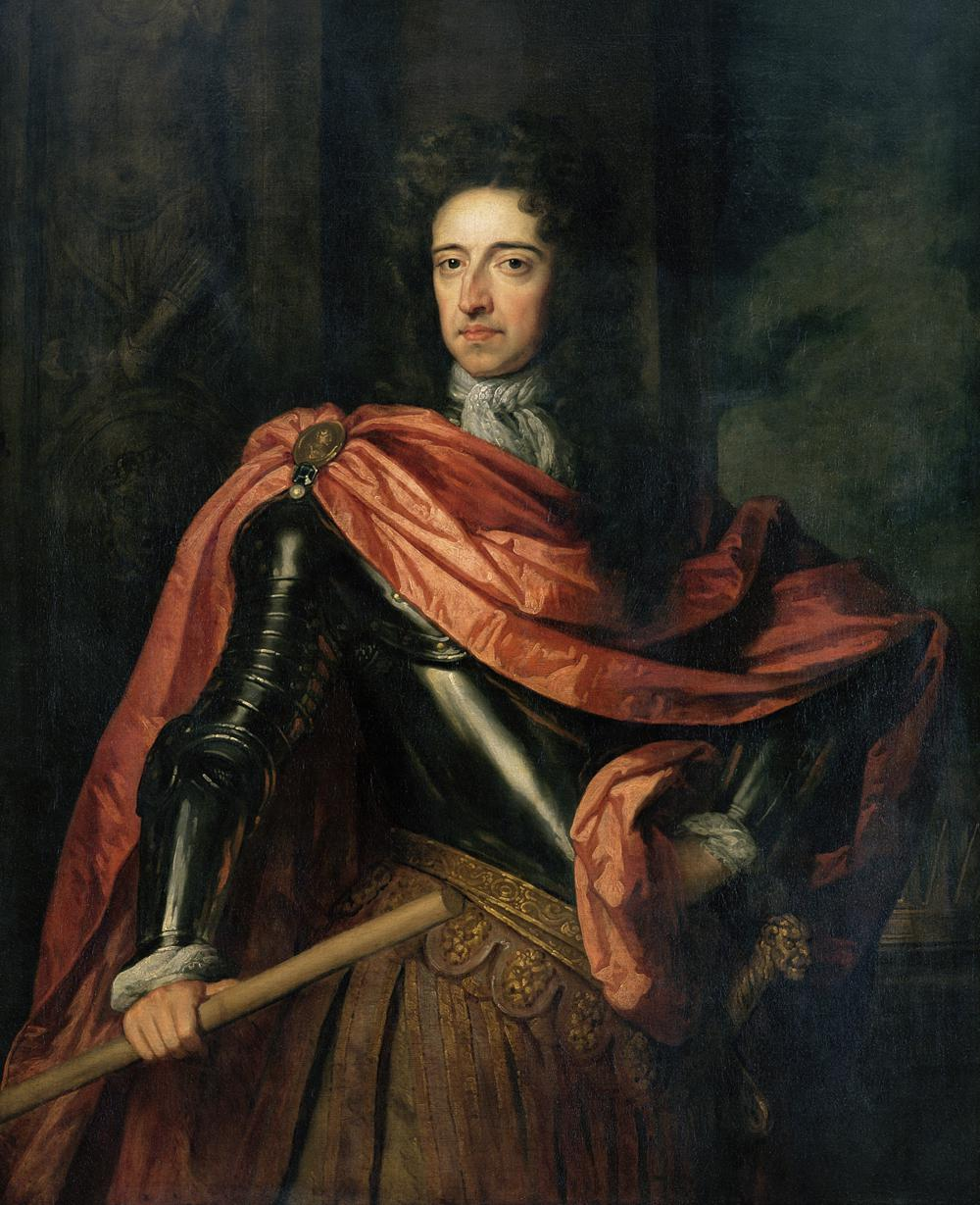
William III of England

- January 1 – George Rooke, Royal Navy admiral (d. 1709)
- January 10 – Countess Sophie Amalie of Nassau-Siegen, Duchess consort of Courland (1682–1688) (d. 1688)
- February 2 – Nell Gwyn, English actress and royal mistress (d. 1687)
- February 5 – Anne-Jules, 2nd duc de Noailles, French general (d. 1708)
- February 26 – Tomás Marín de Poveda, 1st Marquis of Cañada Hermosa, Royal Governor of Chile (d. 1703)
- February 27 – Jan Verkolje, Dutch painter (d. 1693)
- March 6 – John Conyers (MP born 1650), English politician (d. 1725)
- March 24 – Sir Jonathan Trelawny, 3rd Baronet, British bishop (d. 1721)
- March 25
  - Sir Richard Cox, 1st Baronet, England (d. 1733)
  - Ernest, Count of Stolberg-Ilsenburg, German nobleman (d. 1710)
- April 10 – Sebastiano Antonio Tanara, Spanish Catholic cardinal (d. 1724)
- April 15 – Hedwig of the Palatinate-Sulzbach, Archduchess of Austria, Duchess of Saxe-Lauenburg (d. 1681)
- April 18 – Sir Edward Dering, 3rd Baronet, English politician (d. 1689)
- April 20
  - Felice Boselli, Italian painter (d. 1732)
  - William Bedloe, English fraudster and informer (d. 1680)
- April 27 – Charlotte Amalie of Hesse-Kassel, Queen Consort of Denmark (1670–1699) (d. 1714)
- May 19 – Cornelis HrR Ridder de Graeff, Dutch nobleman and chief landholder of the Zijpe and Haze Polder (d. 1678)
- May 26 – John Churchill, 1st Duke of Marlborough, English general (d. 1722)
- June 5 – Ogasawara Nagashige, Japanese daimyō (d. 1732)
- June 14 – Carlo Alessandro Guidi, Italian lyric poet (d. 1712)
- June 25 – Joseph Sherman (Massachusetts Bay Colony), American politician (d. 1731)
- July 1 – Maria Anna Vasa, Polish princess (d. 1651)
- July 6 – Frederick Casimir Kettler, Duke of Courland and Semigallia (d. 1698)
- July 25 – William Burkitt, English biblical expositor, vicar in Dedham (d. 1703)
- July 30 – Edward Lewis (Devizes MP), English politician (d. 1674)
- August 7 – Louis Joseph, Duke of Guise (d. 1671)
- August 16 – Vincenzo Coronelli, Franciscan friar, Italian cartographer, encyclopedist (d. 1718)
- August 17 – Jean Gaston, Duke of Valois (d. 1652)
- August 27 – Carl Philipp, Reichsgraf von Wylich und Lottum, Prussian field marshal (d. 1719)
- August 30 – Ludovico Sabbatini, Italian priest (d. 1724)
- September 7 – Juan Manuel María de la Aurora, 8th duke of Escalona, Spanish aristocrat (d. 1725)
- September 20 – Adrian Beverland, Dutch philosopher and jurist who settled in England (d. 1716)
- September 23 – Jeremy Collier, English theatre critic, non-juror bishop and theologian (d. 1726)
- October 9 – René Auguste Constantin de Renneville, French writer (d. 1723)
- October 10
  - Jane Rolfe, granddaughter of Pocahontas (d. 1676)
  - Ulisse Giuseppe Gozzadini, Italian Catholic cardinal (d. 1728)
- October 19 – Charles Erskine, Earl of Mar (d. 1689)
- October 20 – Robert Shirley, 1st Earl Ferrers, English peer and courtier (d. 1717)
- October 21 – Jean Bart, French admiral (d. 1702)
- October 24 – Steven Blankaart, Dutch entomologist (d. 1704)
- November 4 – King William III of England, Scotland, and Ireland (d. 1702)
- November 7 – John Robinson, English diplomat (d. 1723)
- November 17 – Joanna Koerten, Dutch painter (d. 1715)
- November 18 – Robert Walpole (1650–1700), English politician (d. 1700)
- November 19 – Henry, Duke of Saxe-Römhild (d. 1710)
- November 23 – Joseph Oriol, Spanish Catholic priest, saint (d. 1702)
- November 28 – Jan Palfijn, Flemish surgeon and obstetrician (d. 1730)
- November 30 – Domenico Martinelli, Italian architect (d. 1718)
- December 3 – August of Saxe-Weissenfels (1650–1674), Prince of Saxe-Weissenfels and provost of Magdeburg (d. 1674)
- December 6 – Johann Friedrich Mayer (theologian), German Lutheran theologian (d. 1712)
- December 10 – Theophilus Hastings, 7th Earl of Huntingdon (d. 1701)
- December 16
  - Alexander Hermann, Count of Wartensleben, Prussian field marshal (d. 1734)
  - Sir Robert Marsham, 4th Baronet, English politician (d. 1703)
- December 17 – Christoph Arnold, German astronomer (d. 1695)
- December 25 – Claude Aveneau, French missionary (d. 1711)
- date unknown
  - Thomas Savery, English engineer and inventor (d. 1715)
  - Jan Antonín Losy, Czech lutist (d. 1721)

1651

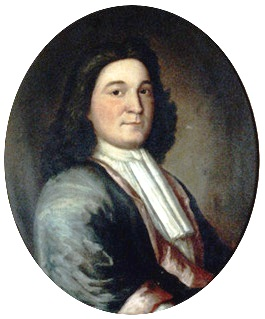
William Phips

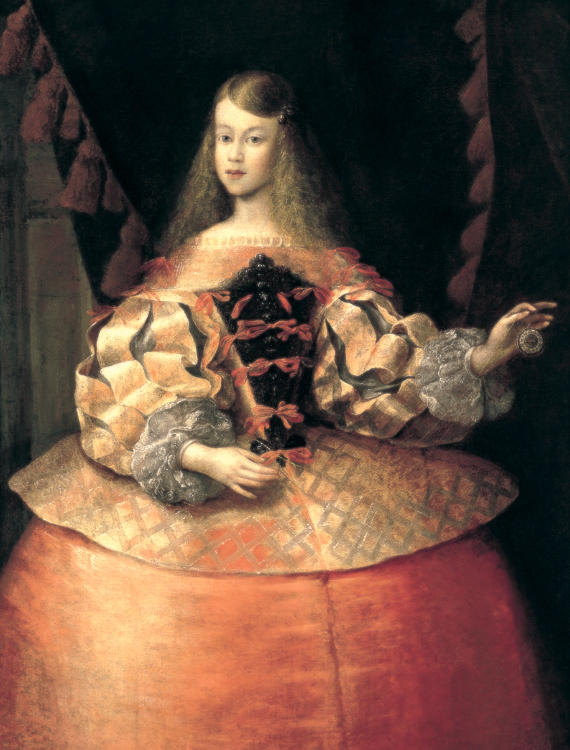
Margaret Theresa of Spain

- January 9 – Petronio Franceschini, Italian Baroque composer (d. 1680)
- January 18 – William Coddington, Jr., Rhode Island colonial governor (d. 1689)
- January 19 – Johannes Wolfgang von Bodman, German bishop (d. 1691)
- January 20 – Edward Tyson, British scientist (d. 1708)
- February 2 or 1950 – William Phips, first royal governor of the Province of Massachusetts Bay (d. 1695)
- February 9 – Procopio Cutò, French entrepreneur (d. 1727)
- February 11 – Sir Ralph Assheton, 2nd Baronet, of Middleton, English politician (d. 1716)
- February 11 – Anne Scott, 1st Duchess of Buccleuch, wealthy Scottish peeress (d. 1732)
- February 21 – Silvius II Frederick, Duke of Württemberg-Oels (d. 1697)
- February 25 – Quirinus Kuhlmann, German Baroque poet and mystic (d. 1689)
- February 26 – Pieter van der Hulst, Dutch painter (d. 1727)
- March 2 – Carlo Gimach, Maltese architect, engineer and poet (d. 1730)
- March 4 – John Somers, 1st Baron Somers, Lord Chancellor of England (d. 1716)
- March 31 – Karl II, Elector Palatine of Germany (d. 1685)
- April 2 – Fabrizio Paolucci, Italian Catholic cardinal (d. 1726)
- April 6 – André Dacier, French classical scholar (d. 1722)
- April 10 – Ehrenfried Walther von Tschirnhaus, German mathematician (d. 1708)
- April 17 – Giuseppe Archinto, Italian cardinal, Archbishop of Milan (d. 1712)
- April 21 – Blessed Joseph Vaz, Apostle of Ceylon (d. 1711)
- April 30 – Jean-Baptiste de la Salle, French educational reformer (d. 1719)
- May 17 – Jacques Gravier, French Jesuit missionary in the New World (d. 1708)
- May 27 – Louis-Antoine, Cardinal de Noailles, French bishop (d. 1729)
- June 6 – Willem van Ingen, Dutch painter (d. 1708)
- June 10 – Alexander Edward, Scottish landscape architect (d. 1708)
- June 16 – Francisco Cuervo y Valdés, Spanish colonial governor (d. 1714)
- June 21 – William VII, Landgrave of Hesse-Kassel (d. 1670)
- July 4 – Honoratus a Sancta Maria, French Discalced Carmelite (d. 1729)
- July 12 – Margaret Theresa of Spain (d. 1673)
- July 22 – Ferdinand Tobias Richter, Austrian Baroque composer (d. 1711)
- July 26 – Jacques Bigot (Jesuit), French Jesuit priest, missionary to the Abenakis in Canada (d. 1711)
- August 6 – François Fénelon, Archbishop of Cambrai, France (d. 1715)
- August 6 – Carl Gustav Rehnskiöld, Swedish Field Marshal (d. 1722)
- August 13 – Balthasar Permoser, German sculptor (d. 1732)
- August 25 – François Baert, Jesuit hagiographer (d. 1719)
- September 1 – Nataliya Kyrillovna Naryshkina, Tsaritsa of Russia (d. 1694)
- September 2 – Zubdat-un-Nissa, Mughal princess, daughter of Emperor Aurangzeb (d. 1707)
- September 5 – William Dampier, English explorer (d. 1715)
- September 6 – Aoyama Tadao, Japanese daimyō (d. 1685)
- September 16 – Engelbert Kaempfer, German physician and traveler (d. 1716)
- September 26 – Francis Daniel Pastorius, German founder of Germantown, Pennsylvania (d. 1720)
- October 24 – Jean de La Chapelle, French writer and dramatist (d. 1723)
- October 26 – Perizonius, Dutch linguist (d. 1715)
- November 1 – Jean-Baptiste Colbert, Marquis de Seignelay, French politician (d. 1690)
- November 12 – Juana Inés de la Cruz, Mexican nun, writer and poet (d. 1695)
- December 25 – Pedro Manuel Colón de Portugal (d. 1710)
- December 28 – Johann Krieger, German composer and organist (d. 1735)
- date unknown – Gorgin Khan, Persian Governor of Kandahar (d. 1709)

1652

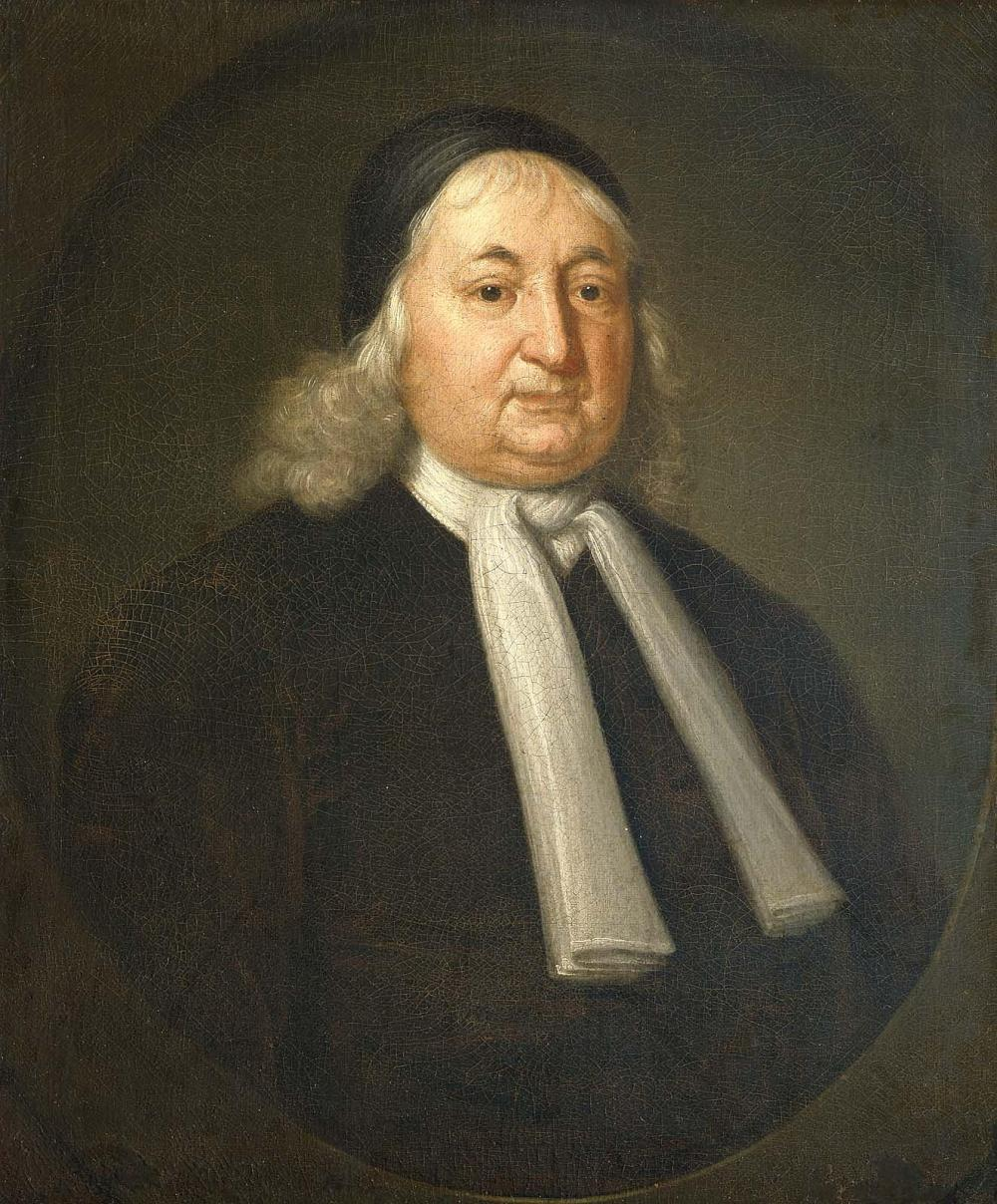
Samuel Sewall

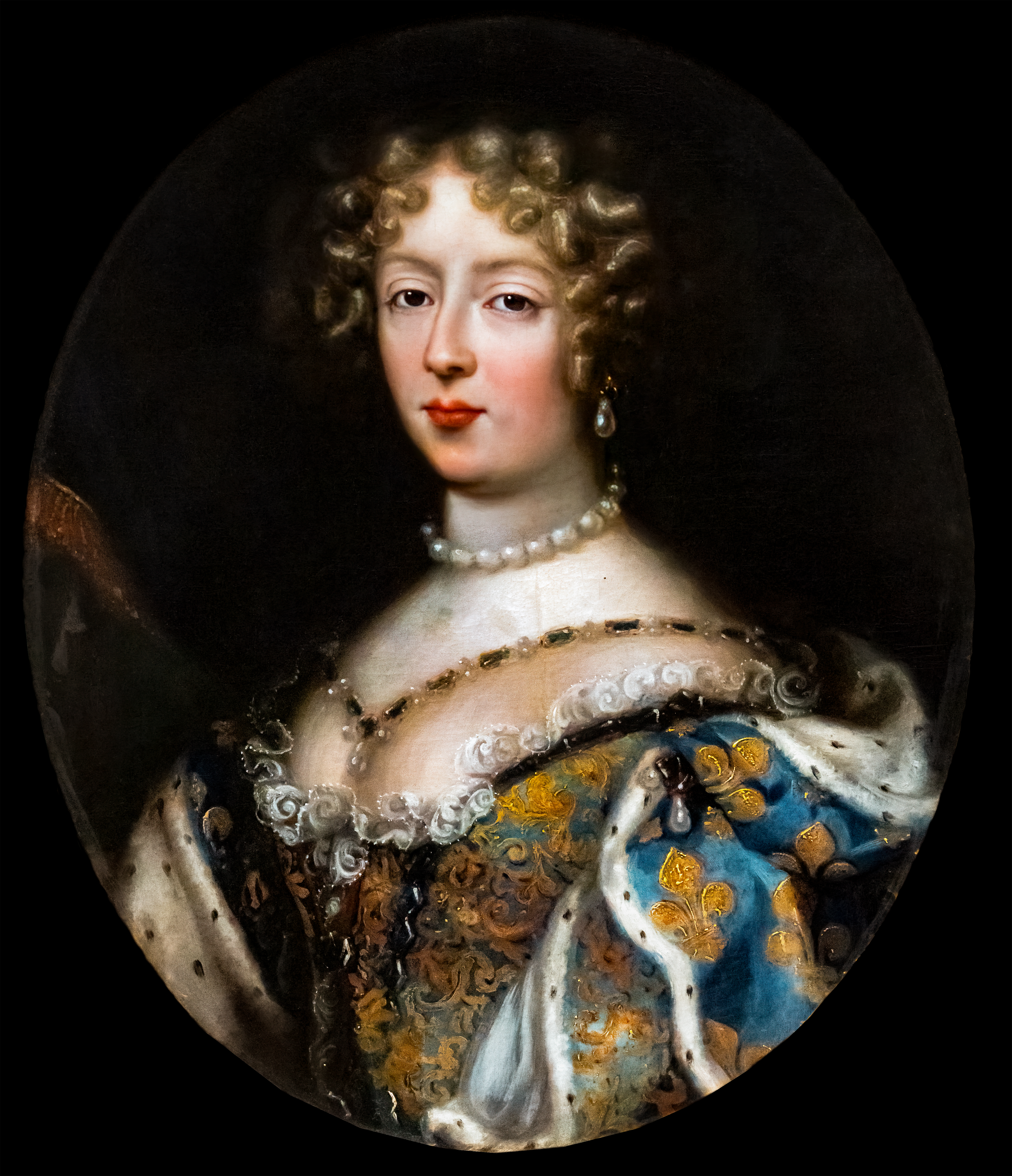
Princess Elisabeth Charlotte

- January 2
  - Sir Gilbert Heathcote, 1st Baronet, Lord Mayor of London (d. 1733)
  - Michel Chamillart, French statesman (d. 1721)
- January 7 – Pavao Ritter Vitezović, Croatian historian (d. 1713)
- January 8 – Wilhelm Homberg, Dutch alchemist (d. 1715)
- January 11 – Eugen Alexander Franz, 1st Prince of Thurn and Taxis, Germany (d. 1714)
- January 13 – Henry Booth, 1st Earl of Warrington, English politician (d. 1694)
- January 16 – Anthony Ashley-Cooper, 2nd Earl of Shaftesbury, English politician (d. 1699)
- January 17 – Claude-Guy Hallé, French painter (d. 1736)
- February 6 – Francesco Pignatelli, Italian Catholic cardinal (d. 1734)
- February 13
  - Anton Domenico Gabbiani, Italian painter (d. 1726)
  - August, Duke of Schleswig-Holstein-Sonderburg-Beck (d. 1689)
- February 14 – Camille d'Hostun, duc de Tallard, Marshal of France (d. 1728)
- March 1 – Louis de Sabran, British theologian (d. 1732)
- March 3 – Thomas Otway, English dramatist (d. 1685)
- March 10 – Giacomo Serpotta, Italian artist (d. 1732)
- March 12 – Johann Heinrich Ernesti, German philosopher, theologian (d. 1729)
- March 14 – Benedicta Henrietta of the Palatinate, German princess (d. 1730)
- March 20 – Leon Bazyli Sapieha, Polish-Lithuanian politician (d. 1686)
- March 21 – Piers Butler, 3rd Viscount Galmoye, Anglo-Irish nobleman (d. 1740)
- March 28 – Samuel Sewall, English-born Massachusetts judge (d. 1730)
- April 7 – Pope Clement XII (d. 1740)
- April 9
  - Jean Le Fèvre (astronomer), French astronomer (d. 1706)
  - Christian Ulrich I, Duke of Württemberg-Oels (d. 1704)
- April 13 – Thomas Ward (author), English writer (d. 1708)
- April 21 – Michel Rolle, French mathematician (d. 1719)
- April 25
  - Boris Sheremetev, Russian noble (d. 1719)
  - Giovanni Battista Foggini, Italian artist (d. 1725)
- April 28 – Magdalena Sibylla of Hesse-Darmstadt, regent and composer (d. 1712)
- May 1 – John King (Rector of Chelsea), English churchman (d. 1732)
- May 2 – Abraham Hinckelmann, German Protestant theologian (d. 1695)
- May 7 – Edward Northey (barrister), British barrister and politician (d. 1723)
- May 11 – Johann Philipp d'Arco, Austrian soldier (d. 1704)
- May 14
  - Juliana of Hesse-Eschwege, German noblewoman (d. 1693)
  - Johann Philipp Förtsch, German opera composer (d. 1732)
- May 20 – Ichijō Kaneteru, Japanese court noble (d. 1705)
- May 27 – Elizabeth Charlotte, Princess Palatine, wife to Philippe I, Duke of Orléans (d. 1722)
- June 1 – Juan Ferreras, Spanish priest (d. 1735)
- June 23 – Jan Brokoff, German sculptor (d. 1718)
- August 3 – Samuel Western, English politician (d. 1699)
- August 15
  - John Grubb, American politician (d. 1708)
  - John Wise (clergyman), American Christian clergyman (d. 1725)
- August 26 – Tsarevna Marfa Alekseyevna of Russia (d. 1707)
- August 31 – Ferdinando Carlo Gonzaga, Duke of Mantua and Montferrat, only child of Duke Charles II (d. 1708)
- September 4
  - Jean Orry, French economist (d. 1719)
  - Tokugawa Tsunanari, Japanese daimyō (d. 1699)
- September 8 – Luisa Roldán, Spanish artist (d. 1706)
- September 10 – Jan Sladký Kozina, Czech revolutionary (d. 1695)
- September 12 – Frederick Charles, Duke of Württemberg-Winnental (d. 1697)
- October 11 – Nathaniel Higginson, English politician (d. 1708)
- October 16
  - Karl, Prince of Anhalt-Zerbst (d. 1718)
  - Jan Mortel, painter from the Northern Netherlands (d. 1719)
- October 29 – Jan Wyck, Dutch military painter (d. 1702)
- November 1 – William Lowndes, English politician (d. 1724)
- November 3 – Louis, Duke of Rohan, French noble (d. 1727)
- November 4 – Marc-René de Voyer de Paulmy d'Argenson (1652–1721), French politician (d. 1721)
- November 9 – Marie Anne d'Orléans, French princess (d. 1656)
- November 10 – Johann Ernst Glück, German theologian, translator (d. 1705)
- December 2 – Karolina of Legnica-Brieg, Silesian noblewoman (d. 1707)
- December 9
  - Augustus Quirinus Rivinus, German physician and botanist (d. 1723)
  - Robert Rochfort, Irish politician (d. 1727)
- December 10 – Frederick, Duke of Schleswig-Holstein-Sonderburg-Augustenburg, German nobleman (d. 1692)
- December 20 – Samuel Bradford, English churchman, Whig politician (d. 1731)
- December 25 – Archibald Pitcairne, Scottish physician (d. 1713)

1653

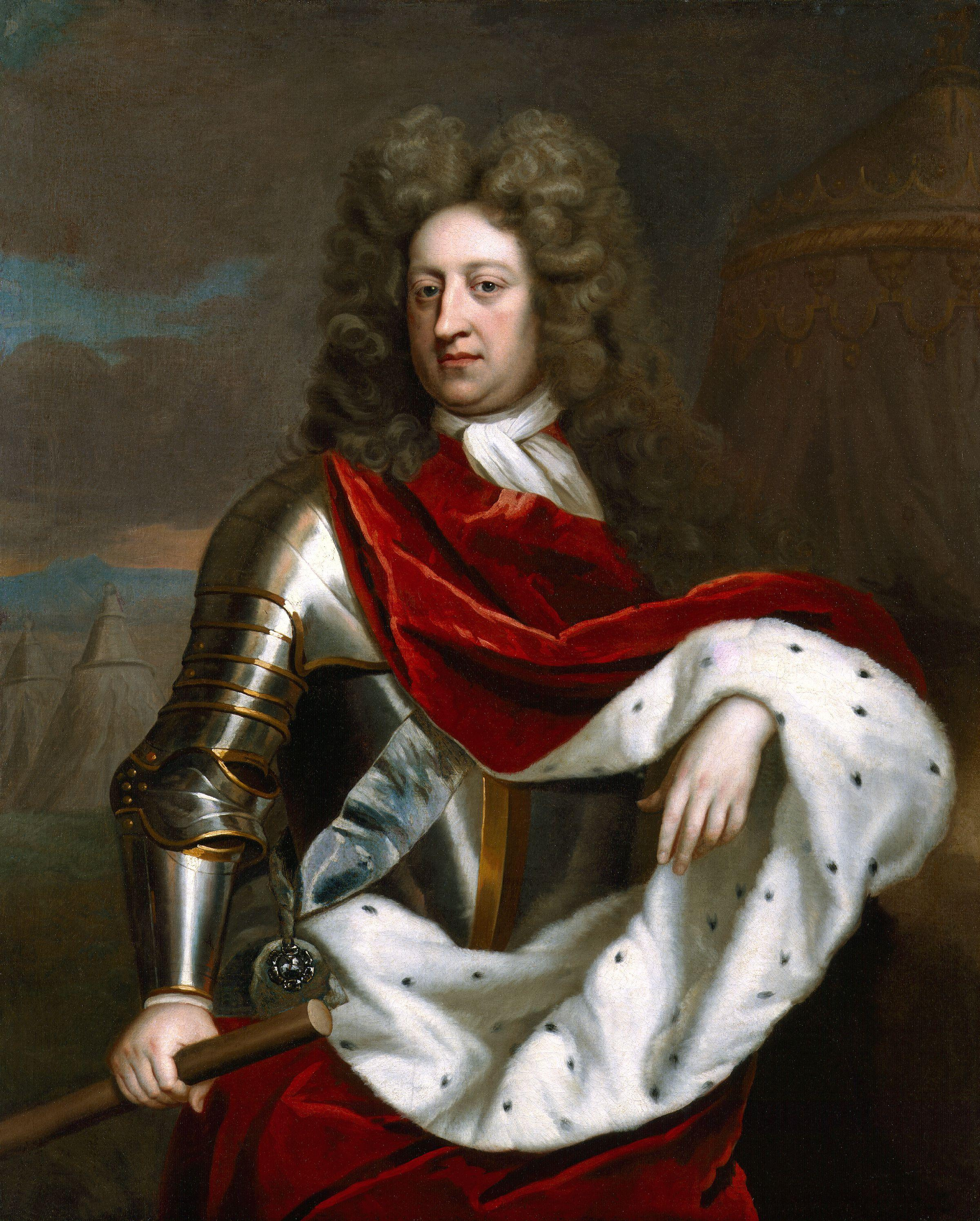
Prince George of Denmark

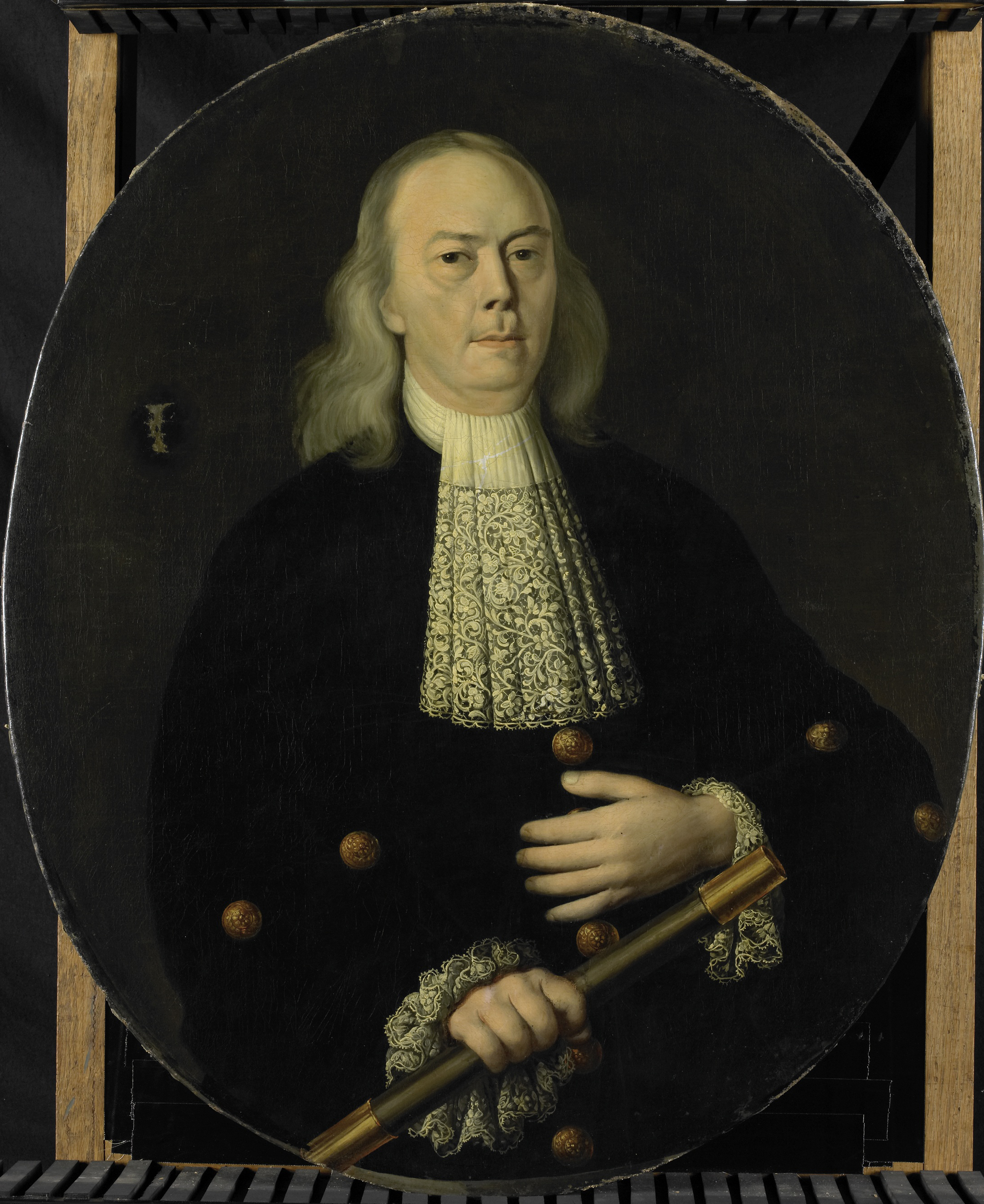
Abraham van Riebeeck

- January 6 – Christian, Duke of Saxe-Eisenberg (d. 1707)
- January 10 – Caspar Herman Hausmann, Danish-Norwegian general (d. 1718)
- January 11 – Anthony Günther, Prince of Anhalt-Zerbst, German prince (d. 1714)
- January 11 – Paolo Alessandro Maffei, Italian antiquarian, humanist (d. 1716)
- January 14 – Robert Price (judge), British judge and politician (d. 1733)
- January 16 – Johann Conrad Brunner, Swiss anatomist (d. 1727)
- January 24 – Dom Jacques Alexandre, French Benedictine (d. 1734)
- January 31 – William Tempest (politician), English Member of Parliament (d. 1700)
- January 31 – Anna Catherine of Nassau-Ottweiler, Wild and Rhinegravine of Salm-Dhaun by marriage (d. 1731)
- February 12 – Giovanni Francesco Grossi, Italian opera singer (d. 1697)
- February 17 – Arcangelo Corelli, Italian composer (d. 1713)
- February 22 – Martín de Ursúa, Spanish conquistador (d. 1715)
- February 22 – Elisabeth Johanna of Veldenz, Wild and Rhinegravine of Salm-Kyrburg (d. 1718)
- February 22 – Vidal Marín del Campo, Spanish Grand Inquisitor (d. 1709)
- March 1 – Jean-Baptiste-Henri de Valincour, French classical scholar (d. 1730)
- March 1 – Pacificus of San Severino, Italian saint (d. 1721)
- March 8 – Goodwin Wharton, British politician (d. 1704)
- March 10 – John Kettlewell, English clergyman (d. 1695)
- March 10 – John Benbow, English Royal Navy Admiral (d. 1702)
- March 21 – John Hampden (1653–1696), English politician (d. 1696)
- March 24 – Joseph Sauveur, French mathematician (d. 1716)
- April 2 – Prince George of Denmark, consort of Anne, Queen of Great Britain (d. 1708)
- April 2 – Egidio Quinto, Serbian Catholic bishop (d. 1722)
- April 6 – Frederick Louis, Duke of Schleswig-Holstein-Sonderburg-Beck (d. 1728)
- April 19 – William Sewel, Dutch historian (d. 1720)
- April 25 – Benedetto Pamphili, Italian cardinal, patron of the arts, composer and librettist (d. 1730)
- April 25 – Sir John Bowyer, 2nd Baronet, English politician (d. 1691)
- May 3 – Archibald Douglas, 1st Earl of Forfar, Scottish peer (d. 1712)
- May 8 – Claude Louis Hector de Villars, Marshal of France (d. 1734)
- May 21 – Eleanor of Austria, Queen of Poland (d. 1697)
- May 21 – Christopher Vane, 1st Baron Barnard, English politician and peer (d. 1723)
- May 22 – Peter Gott, English politician (d. 1712)
- May 30 – Claudia Felicitas of Austria, Holy Roman Empress (d. 1676)
- June 1 – Georg Muffat, German composer and organist (d. 1704)
- June 11 – Gaspar de la Cerda, 8th Count of Galve (d. 1697)
- June 12 – Maria Amalia of Courland, Landgravine of Hesse-Kassel (d. 1711)
- June 16 – James Bertie, 1st Earl of Abingdon, English nobleman (d. 1699)
- June 20 – Richard Maitland, 4th Earl of Lauderdale, Scottish politician (d. 1695)
- June 26 – Cardinal André-Hercule de Fleury, Bishop of Fréjus, chief minister of France under Louis XV of France (d. 1743)
- June 28 – Muhammad Azam Shah, Mughal emperor (d. 1707)
- July 4 – Sir Walter Clarges, 1st Baronet, English politician (d. 1706)
- July 5 – Thomas Pitt, British Governor of Madras (d. 1726)
- July 11 – Sarah Good, accused Massachusetts witch (d. 1692)
- August 9 – John Oldham, English poet (d. 1683)
- August 10 – Louis-Guillaume Pécour, French dancer and choreographer (d. 1729)
- August 14 – Christopher Monck, 2nd Duke of Albemarle, English statesman (d. 1688)
- August 15 – Johann Friedrich Gleditsch, German book publisher (d. 1716)
- August 18 – Julius Siegmund, Duke of Württemberg-Juliusburg (d. 1684)
- August 28 – Jesper Swedberg, Swedish hymnwriter (d. 1735)
- September 1 – Johann Pachelbel, German organist and composer (d. 1706)
- September 3 – Roger North, English lawyer and biographer (d. 1734)
- September 4 – Henry Wise (gardener), English gardener (d. 1738)
- September 8 – Sir Walter Yonge, 3rd Baronet, English politician (d. 1731)
- September 8 – Fuquan (prince), Chinese Qing Dynasty prince (d. 1703)
- September 17 – Sir Henry Monson, 3rd Baronet, English politician (d. 1718)
- October 1 – Sir George Speke, 2nd Baronet, English politician (d. 1683)
- October 8 – Michel Baron, French actor (d. 1729)
- October 10 – Anton Günther II, Count of Schwarzburg-Sondershausen-Arnstadt (d. 1716)
- October 18 – Abraham van Riebeeck, Governor-General of the Dutch East Indies (d. 1713)
- November 11 – Carlo Ruzzini, Doge of Venice (d. 1735)
- November 14 – Jean-Baptiste de La Croix de Chevrières de Saint-Vallier, Catholic bishop of Quebec (d. 1727)
- November 19 – Christian II, Duke of Saxe-Merseburg (d. 1694)
- November 26 – Empress Xiaochengren, Chinese Qing Dynasty empress (d. 1674)
- November 29 – Thomas Cromwell, 3rd Earl of Ardglass, English nobleman (d. 1682)
- December 3 – Giovanni Battista Tolomei, Italian Jesuit priest, theologian and cardinal (d. 1726)
- December 26 – Johann Conrad Peyer, Swiss anatomist (d. 1712)
- December 28 – Mary Howard, of the Holy Cross, English nun of the Poor Clares (d. 1735)
- date unknown
  - Chikamatsu Monzaemon, Japanese playwright (d. 1725)
  - Rahman Baba, Afghan Pashto Sufi poet (d. 1711)
  - Johann Pachelbel, German composer (d. 1706)

1654

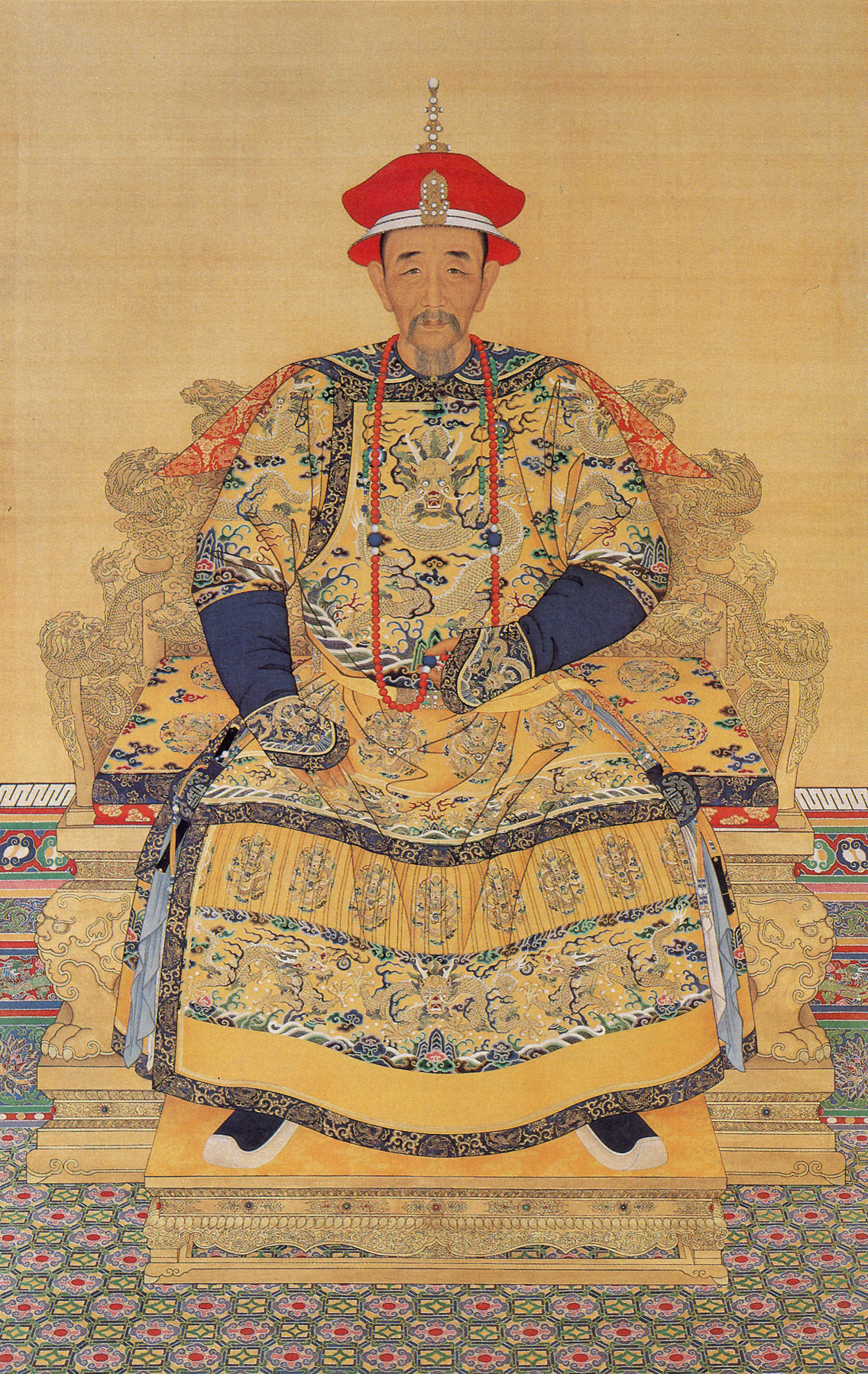
Kangxi Emperor

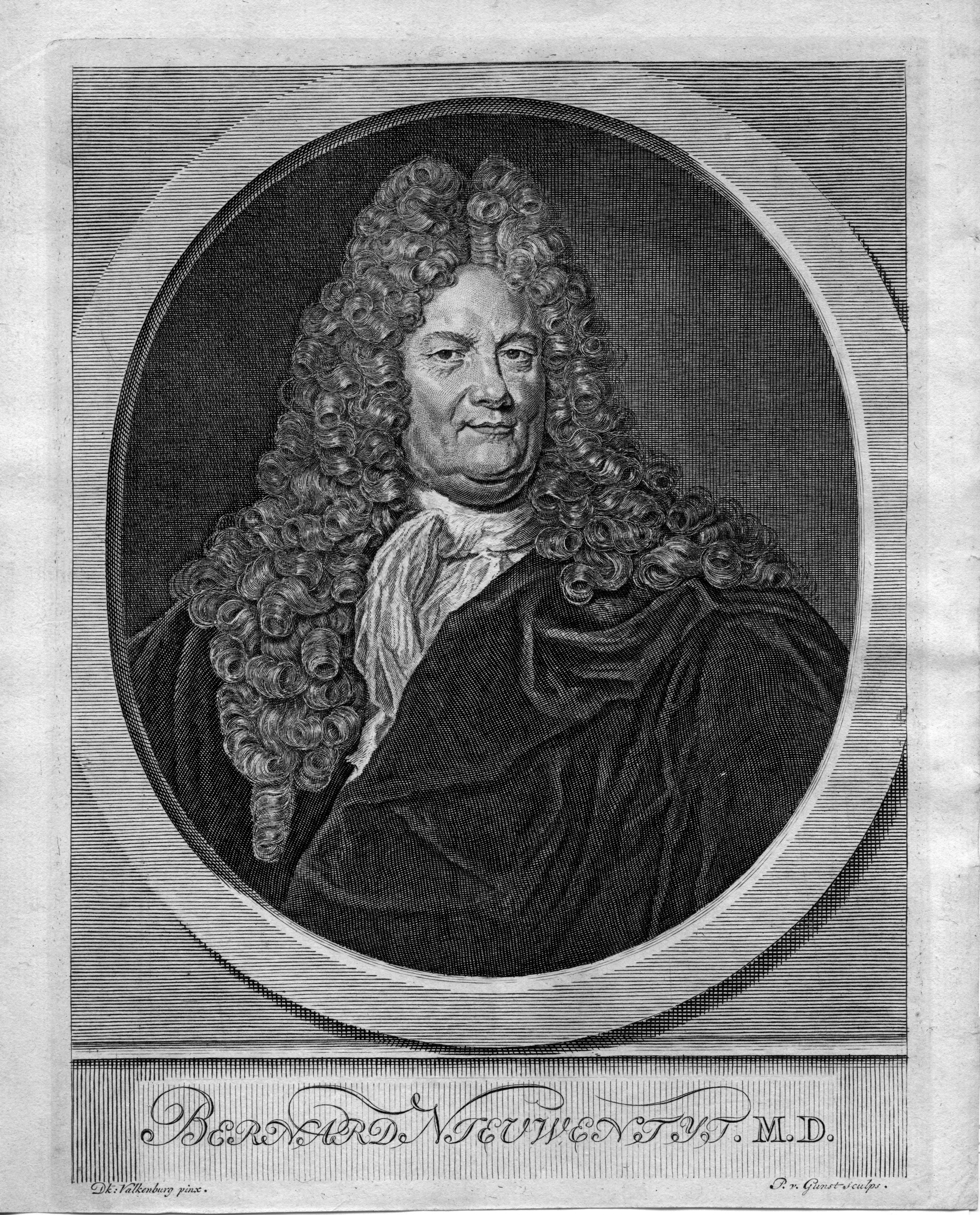
Bernard Nieuwentyt

- January 5 – Henry Poley, English politician (d. 1707)
- January 10 – Joshua Barnes, English scholar (d. 1712)
- January 10 – Giovanni Maria Gabrielli, Italian Catholic cardinal (d. 1711)
- January 20 – Michiel de Swaen, Flemish poet (d. 1707)
- January 22 – Richard Blackmore, English physician and writer (d. 1729)
- February 3 – Pietro Antonio Fiocco, Italian composer (d. 1714)
- February 12 – Dorothea Maria of Saxe-Gotha-Altenburg, German princess (d. 1682)
- February 15 – Tsarevich Alexei Alexeyevich of Russia, son and heir of Tsar Alexis of Russia (d. 1670)
- February 22 – Elizabeth Monck, Duchess of Albemarle (d. 1734)
- March 6 – Andreas Acoluthus, German scholar (d. 1704)
- March 9 – Robert Leke, 3rd Earl of Scarsdale, English earl, politician (d. 1707)
- March 10 – Giuseppe Bartolomeo Chiari, Italian painter (d. 1727)
- March 12 – Charles Egerton (MP for Brackley), English politician (d. 1717)
- March 12 – Giuseppe Passeri, Italian painter (d. 1714)
- March 12 – Jan Hoogsaat, Dutch painter (d. 1730)
- March 12 – Frederick Augustus, Duke of Württemberg-Neuenstadt (d. 1716)
- March 16 – Andreas Acoluthus, German orientalist (d. 1704)
- March 28 – Sophie Amalie Moth, royal mistress of King Christian V of Denmark (d. 1719)
- March 28 – Joan de Cabanas, Occitan language writer (d. 1711)
- March 31 – Lorenzo Cozza, Italian Catholic cardinal (d. 1729)
- April 8 – Peder Krog, Lutheran bishop (d. 1731)
- April 20 – John Backwell, English politician (d. 1708)
- April 27 – Charles Blount (deist), English deist and philosopher (d. 1693)
- April 30 – Robert Digby, 3rd Baron Digby, English peer and Member of Parliament (d. 1677)
- May 4 – Kangxi Emperor of Qing China (d. 1722)
- May 13 – Thomas Lennard, 1st Earl of Sussex, English cricketer (d. 1715)
- May 23 – Nicodemus Tessin the Younger, Swedish architect (d. 1728)
- May 28 – Thomas Handcock, Irish politician (d. 1726)
- June 4 – Jean-François Gerbillon, French Jesuit missionary active in China (d. 1707)
- June 23 – Grzegorz Antoni Ogiński, Polish-Lithuanian noble (d. 1709)
- June 23 – Richard Onslow, 1st Baron Onslow, English politician (d. 1717)
- June 23 – Sophia of Saxe-Weissenfels, Princess of Anhalt-Zerbst (d. 1724)
- June 24 – Thomas Fuller (writer), British physician (d. 1734)
- June 30 – Thomas Rice (1654), Massachusetts legislator (d. 1747)
- July 1 – Louis Joseph, Duke of Vendôme, French military commander (d. 1712)
- July 7 – Aoyama Tadashige, Japanese daimyō (d. 1722)
- July 9 – Emperor Reigen of Japan (d. 1732)
- July 24 – Henry Herbert, 1st Baron Herbert of Chirbury, English politician (d. 1709)
- July 25 – Agostino Steffani, Italian ecclesiastic, diplomat and composer (d. 1728)
- August 3 – Charles I, Landgrave of Hesse-Kassel (d. 1730)
- August 4 – Thomas Brodrick (1654–1730), Irish politician (d. 1730)
- August 10 – Bernard Nieuwentyt, Dutch mathematician and philosopher (d. 1718)
- August 15 – John Joseph of the Cross, Italian saint (d. 1739)
- August 23 – Anthony Morris (I), American politician (d. 1721)
- September 7 – François Pagi, French Franciscan historian of the Catholic Church (d. 1721)
- September 11 – William Handcock (1654–1701), Irish politician (d. 1701)
- September 16 – Philippe Avril, French Jesuit explorer (d. 1698)
- October 6 – Johan Peringskiöld, Swedish antiquarian (d. 1720)
- October 18 – John Frederick, Margrave of Brandenburg-Ansbach (d. 1686)
- October 23 – Johann Bernhard Staudt, Austrian composer (d. 1712)
- October 26 – Giovanni Maria Lancisi, Italian physician (d. 1720)
- November 5 – Christian Liebe, German composer (d. 1708)
- November 7 – Sir John Delaval, 3rd Baronet, English politician (d. 1729)
- November 9 – Christoph Weigel the Elder, German engraver (d. 1725)
- November 23 – George Watson (accountant), a Scottish accountant and the founder of George Watson's College in Edinburgh (d. 1723)
- November 23 – Jan van Kessel the Younger, Flemish painter in Spain (d. 1708)
- November 27 – Friedrich von Canitz, German poet and diplomat (d. 1699)
- December 1 – John Hartstonge, Irish bishop (d. 1717)
- December 10 – Giovanni Gioseffo dal Sole, Italian painter (d. 1719)
- December 13 – Robert Livingston the Elder, New York colonial official (d. 1728)
- December 15 – Johann Theodor Jablonski, German lexicographer (d. 1731)
- December 22 – Edmond Martène, French Benedictine historian and liturgist (d. 1739)
- December 30 – Archduchess Maria Anna Josepha of Austria, youngest surviving daughter of Ferdinand III (d. 1689)
- probable – Eleanor Glanville, English entomologist (died 1709)

1655

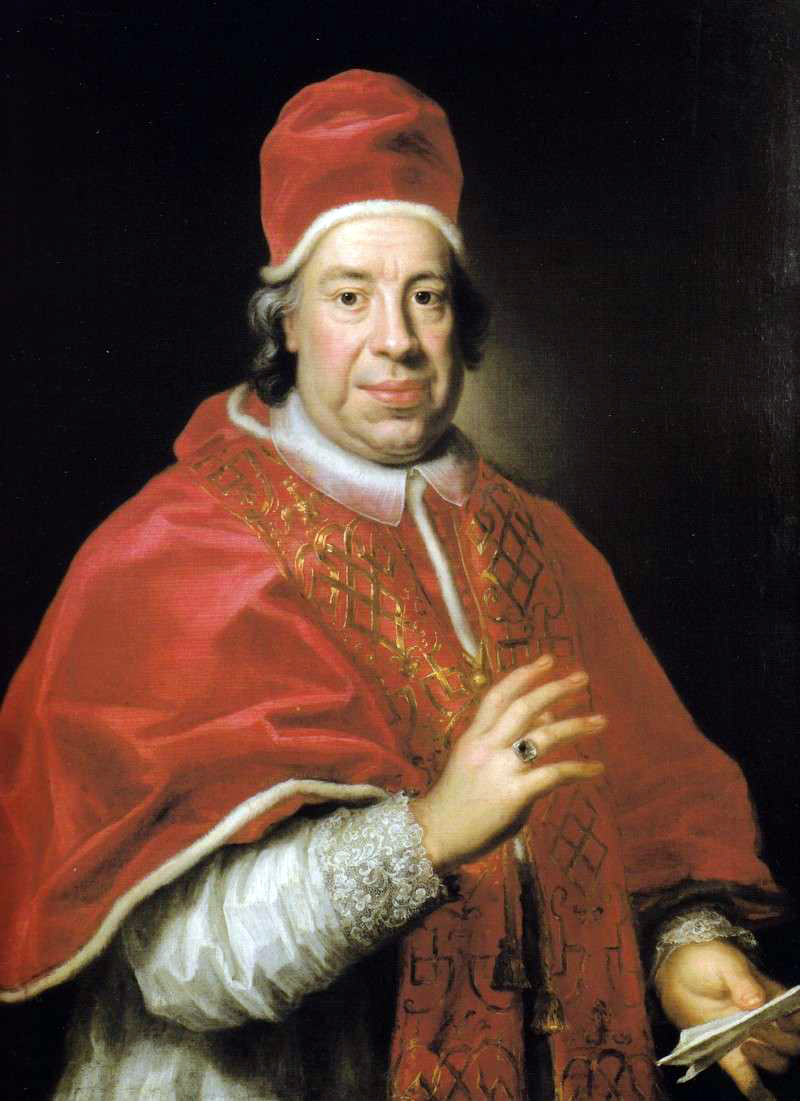
Pope Innocent XIII

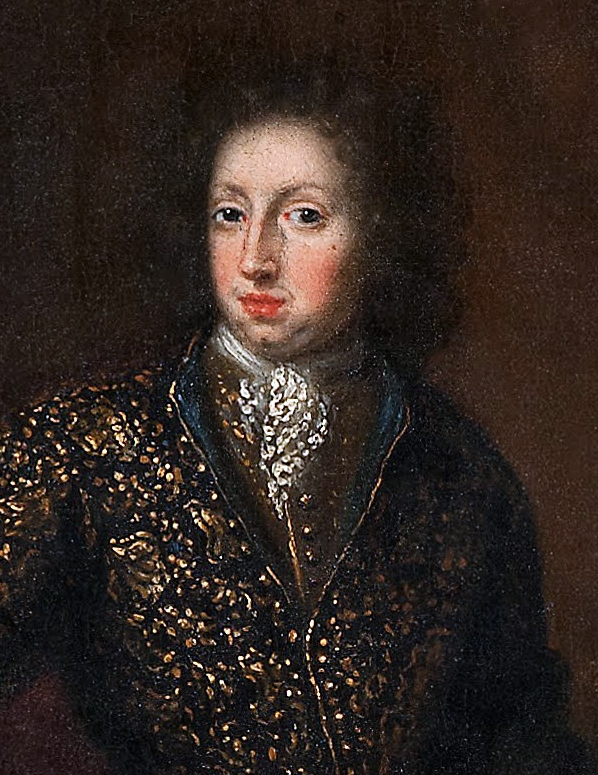
Charles XI of Sweden

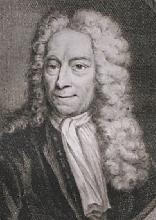
Isaac van Hoornbeek

- January 1 – Christian Thomasius, German jurist (d. 1728)
- January 5 – John Coney (silversmith), early American silversmith/goldsmith (d. 1722)
- January 6
  - Niccolò Comneno Papadopoli, Italian jurist of religious law and historian (d. 1740)
  - Eleonor Magdalene of Neuburg, Holy Roman Empress (d. 1720)
- January 11
  - Charles Sergison, English politician (d. 1732)
  - Henry Howard, 7th Duke of Norfolk, England (d. 1701)
- January 13 – Bernard de Montfaucon, French Benedictine monk (d. 1741)
- January 19 – Nalan Xingde, Chinese poet (d. 1685)
- January 21 – Antonio Molinari, Italian painter (d. 1704)
- January 25 – Cornelius Anckarstjerna, Dutch-born Swedish admiral (d. 1714)
- January 27 – Henri de Nesmond, French churchman (d. 1727)
- February 2 – William "Tangier" Smith, Moroccan mayor (d. 1705)
- February 7 – Jean-François Regnard, French comic poet (d. 1709)
- February 14 – Jacques-Nicolas Colbert, French churchman (d. 1707)
- February 15 – August, Duke of Saxe-Merseburg-Zörbig, German prince (d. 1715)
- February 16 – Charles, Electoral Prince of Brandenburg, German prince (d. 1674)
- February 25 – Carel de Moor, Dutch painter (d. 1738) (Note: Arnold Houbraken mentioned erroneously 1656 as his birth in the book De groote schouburgh der Nederlantsche konstschilders en schilderessen, but the correct date is 1655.)
- February 28 – Johann Beer, Austrian composer (d. 1700)
- March 4 – Fra Galgario, Italian painter (d. 1743)
- March 6 – Frederik Krag, Danish nobleman and senior civil servant (d. 1728)
- March 23
  - Richard Hill of Hawkstone, English statesman (d. 1727)
  - Sir Richard Myddelton, 3rd Baronet, English politician (d. 1716)
- April 8 – Louis William, Margrave of Baden-Baden, Germany (d. 1707)
- April 19 – George St Lo, Royal Navy officer and administrator (d. 1718)
- April 25 – John Lowther, 1st Viscount Lonsdale, English politician (d. 1700)
- April 26
  - Rinaldo d'Este (1655–1737), Duke of Modena (d. 1737)
  - Ofspring Blackall, Bishop of Exeter (d. 1716)
- May 4 – Bartolomeo Cristofori, Italian maker of musical instruments, invented the piano (d. 1731)
- May 13 – Pope Innocent XIII (d. 1724)
- May 31 – Jacques Eléonor Rouxel de Grancey, Marshal of France (d. 1725)
- June 4 – Thomas of Cori, Italian Friar Minor and preacher (d. 1729)
- June 11 – Antonio Cifrondi, Italian painter (d. 1730)
- June 12 – Ernest, Duke of Saxe-Hildburghausen (d. 1715)
- July 7 – Christoph Dientzenhofer, German architect (d. 1722)
- July 20 – Ford Grey, 1st Earl of Tankerville, England (d. 1701)
- August 2 – Sir John Hotham, 3rd Baronet, English politician (d. 1691)
- August 13 – Johann Christoph Denner, German musical instrument maker, invented the clarinet (d. 1707)
- August 16 – Frederick Christian, Count of Schaumburg-Lippe (d. 1728)
- August 18 – James Collett, English-born merchant who settled in Norway (d. 1727)
- August 22 – Joseph Robineau de Villebon, governor of Acadia (d. 1700)
- September 2 – Andries Pels, Dutch banker (d. 1731)
- September 9 – James Johnston (Secretary of State), diplomat, Secretary of State for Scotland (d. 1737)
- September 12 – Sébastien de Brossard, French composer and music theorist (d. 1730)
- September 14 – Éléonor Marie du Maine du Bourg, French nobleman and general (d. 1739)
- September 21 – Roger Cave, English politician (d. 1703)
- September 29 – Johann Ferdinand of Auersperg, Duke of Münsterberg (d. 1705)
- September 30 – Charles III, Prince of Guéméné, French nobleman (d. 1727)
- October 4 – Lothar Franz von Schönborn, Archbishop of Mainz (d. 1729)
- October 12 – Richard Neville (the younger), English politician (d. 1717)
- October 25 – Fabio Brulart de Sillery, French churchman (d. 1714)
- November 1 – Ferdinand Kettler, Duke of Courland and Semigallia (d. 1737)
- November 6 – Daniel Lascelles (1655–1734), English Member of Parliament (d. 1734)
- November 12
  - Eustache Restout, French painter (d. 1743)
  - Francis Nicholson, British Army general, colonial administrator (d. 1727)
- November 16 – Alessandro Gherardini, Italian painter (d. 1726)
- November 18 – Walter Norborne, English politician (d. 1684)
- November 19 – Sir William Robinson, 1st Baronet, British politician (d. 1736)
- November 20 – Sir Thomas Grosvenor, 3rd Baronet, English politician (d. 1700)
- November 24 – King Charles XI of Sweden (d. 1697)
- December 9 – Isaac van Hoornbeek, Grand Pensionary of Holland (d. 1727)
- December 10 – Sir William Forester, British politician (d. 1718)
- December 13 – John Evelyn the Younger, English translator (d. 1699)
- December 14 – Philip, Landgrave of Hesse-Philippsthal, son of William VI (d. 1721)
- December 27 – Abstrupus Danby, English politician (d. 1727)
- December 28 – Charles Cornwallis, 3rd Baron Cornwallis, First Lord of the British Admiralty (d. 1698)
- December 29 – Lewis Watson, 1st Earl of Rockingham, English politician (d. 1724)
- date unknown – Zumbi, runaway slave in Brazil (d. 1695)

1656

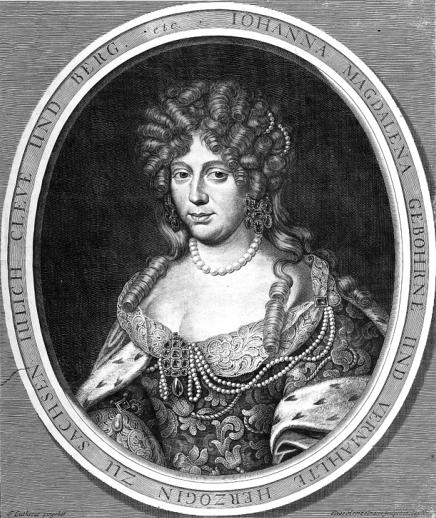
Duchess Johanna Magdalena of Saxe-Altenburg

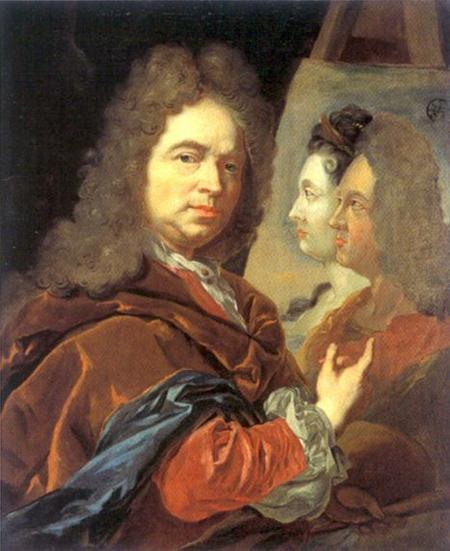
Jan Frans van Douven

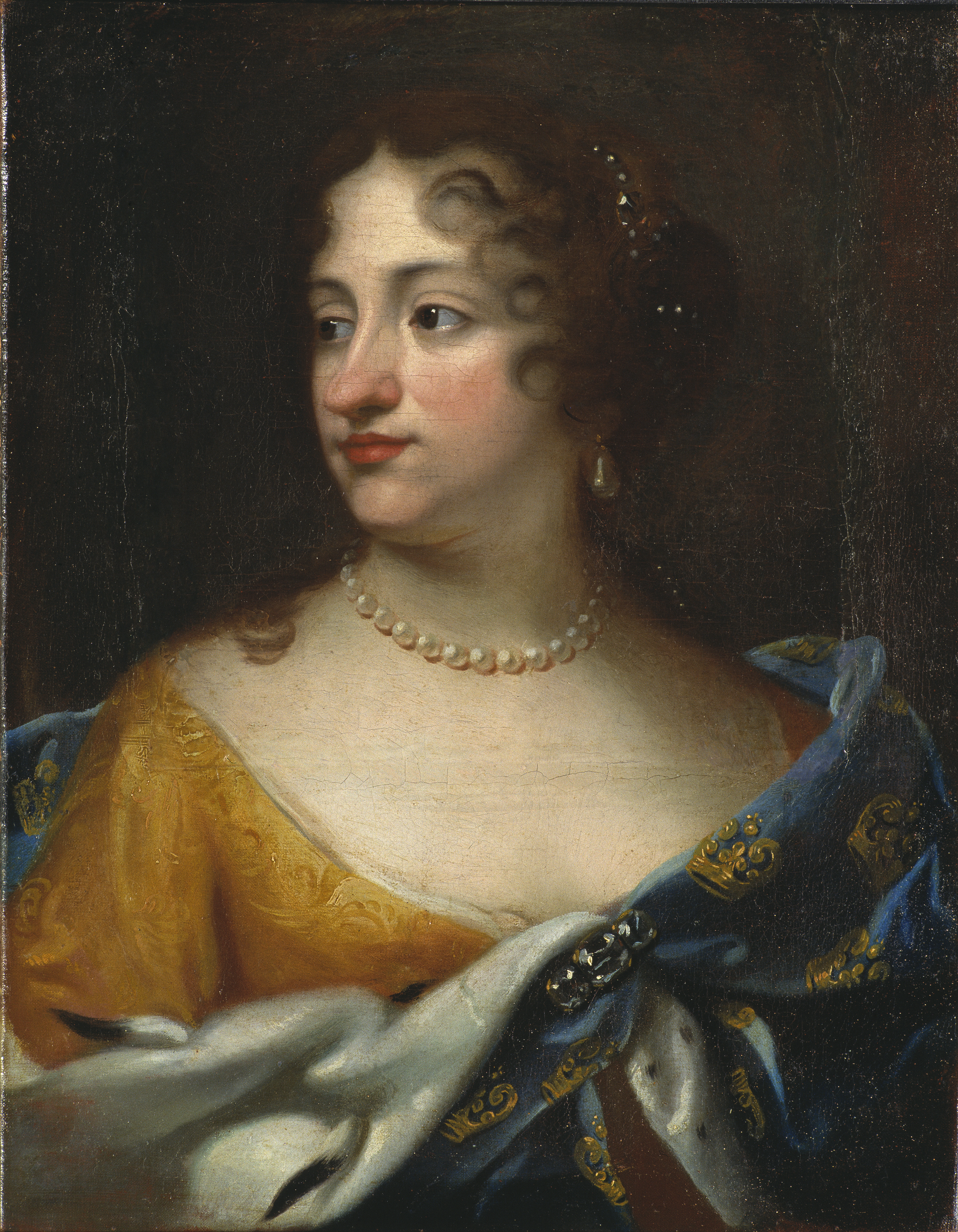
Ulrika Eleonora of Denmark

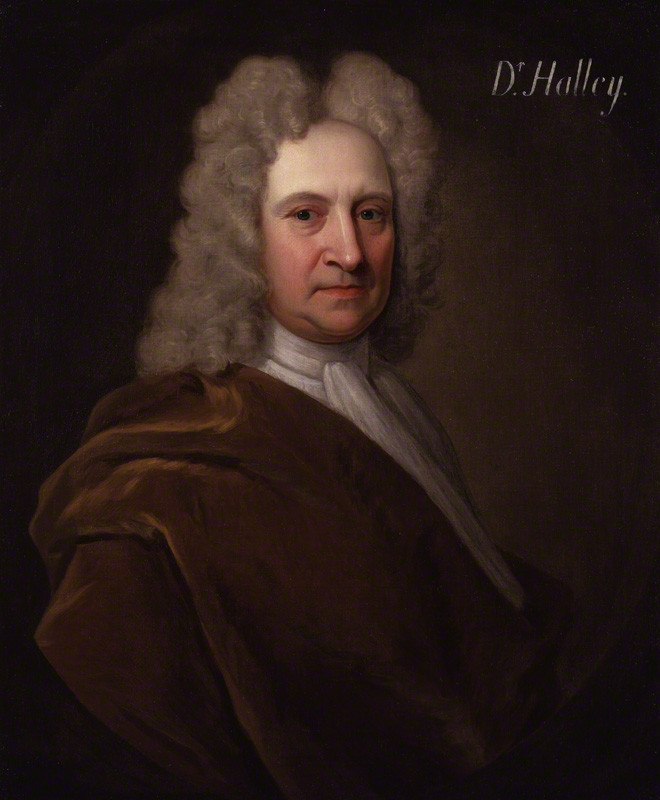
Edmond Halley

- January 1 – William Fleetwood, Anglican bishop (d. 1723)
- January 2 – Paolo Panelli, Italian painter (d. 1759)
- January 14 – Duchess Johanna Magdalena of Saxe-Altenburg (d. 1686)
- January 15 – John Ashburnham, 1st Baron Ashburnham, English politician (d. 1710)
- January 29 – Samuel Andrew, American Congregational clergyman and educator (d. 1738)
- February 2 – Charles Churchill, English Army general and politician (d. 1714)
- February 9 – Rose Venerini, Italian saint, educational pioneer (d. 1728)
- February 10 – Ferdinand de Marsin, Marshal of France (d. 1706)
- February 16 – Anthony Cary, 5th Viscount of Falkland, English politician (d. 1694)
- March 1 – Maria Angela Caterina d'Este, Italian princess (d. 1722)
- March 2 – Jan Frans van Douven, Dutch painter (d. 1727)
- March 11 – Duchess Marie Elisabeth of Hesse-Darmstadt (d. 1715)
- March 13 – Hachisuka Tsunamichi, Japanese daimyō, ruler of the Tokushima Domain (d. 1678)
- March 26 – Nicolaas Hartsoeker, Dutch mathematician and physicist (d. 1725)
- March 30 – Nicolas de Largillière, French painter (d. 1746)
- March 31
  - Giovanni Batista Bussi, Italian Catholic cardinal (d. 1726)
  - Juan Andrés de Ustariz, Royal Governor of Cuba (d. 1718)
- April 17 – William Molyneux, Irish politician, philosopher and writer (d. 1698)
- April 9 – Francesco Trevisani, Italian painter (d. 1746)
- April 10 – René Lepage de Sainte-Claire, lord-founder of Rimouski in eastern Quebec, Canada (d. 1718)
- April 12 – Benoît de Maillet, French diplomat and natural historian (d. 1738)
- April 23 – Anton Egon, Prince of Fürstenberg-Heiligenberg, Governor of the Electorate of Saxony (d. 1716)
- May 2 – Sir Richard Levinge, 1st Baronet, Anglo-Irish politician and judge (d. 1724)
- May 4 – John Louis I, Prince of Anhalt-Dornburg (d. 1704)
- May 8 – Sir John Mainwaring, 2nd Baronet, English member of Parliament (d. 1702)
- May 23 – Rebecca Rawson, Massachusetts heroine of the 1849 book Leaves from Margaret Smith's Journal (d. 1692)
- May 28 – Anton Florian, Prince of Liechtenstein (d. 1721)
- May 31 – Marin Marais, French composer and viol player (d. 1728)
- June 5 – Joseph Pitton de Tournefort, French botanist (d. 1708)
- June 17 – Paul Thymich, German poet (d. 1694)
- July 1 – Polykarp Leyser III, German Lutheran theologian (d. 1725)
- July 4 – John Leake, English Royal Navy admiral (d. 1720)
- July 5 – John Hamilton, 2nd Lord Belhaven and Stenton, Scottish politician (d. 1708)
- July 7 – Guru Har Krishan, 8th Guru of Sikhism (d. 1664)
- July 15
  - Massimiliano Soldani Benzi, Italian sculptor (d. 1740)
  - Gerard Langbaine, English dramatic biographer and critic (d. 1692)
- July 16 – George Ashby, English member of Parliament (d. 1728)
- July 18 – Joachim Bouvet, French Jesuit active in China (d. 1730)
- July 20 – Johann Bernhard Fischer von Erlach, Austrian architect (d. 1723)
- August 6 – Claude de Forbin, French naval commander (d. 1733)
- August 12 – Claude de Visdelou, French missionary (d. 1737)
- August 16 – Christian Knaut, German physician (d. 1716)
- August 18 – Ferdinando Galli-Bibiena, Italian painter (d. 1743)
- September 6 – Guillaume Dubois, French cardinal and statesman (d. 1723)
- September 7 – Robert Molesworth, 1st Viscount Molesworth, Irish politician (d. 1725)
- September 9
  - Johann Caspar Ferdinand Fischer, German organist and composer (d. 1746)
  - Thomas Hewet, English landowner and architect (d. 1726)
- September 11 – Ulrika Eleonora of Denmark, Swedish queen consort (d. 1693)
- September 14 – Thomas Baker, English antiquarian (d. 1740)
- September 26 – William des Bouverie, English aristocrat and merchant (d. 1717)
- October 2 – Hendrik Carré, Dutch painter (d. 1721)
- October 20 – Nicolas de Largillière, French painter (d. 1746)
- November 3 – Georg Reutter, German composer and organist (d. 1738)
- November 8 – Edmond Halley, English scientist (d. 1742)
- November 18 – Jacques de Tourreil, French lawyer (d. 1714)
- November 20 – Duchess Eleonore Charlotte of Württemberg-Montbéliard (d. 1743)
- November 23 – Jacob de Heusch, Dutch painter (d. 1701)
- December 2 – Joshua Oldfield, English Presbyterian minister (d. 1729)
- December 11 – Johann Michael Rottmayr, Austrian painter (d. 1730)
- date unknown
  - Patrick Abercromby, Scottish physician and antiquarian (d. c. 1716)
  - Maria Oriana Galli-Bibiena, Italian painter (d. 1749)
  - Kateri Tekakwitha, Native American beatified in the Roman Catholic Church (d. 1680)

1657

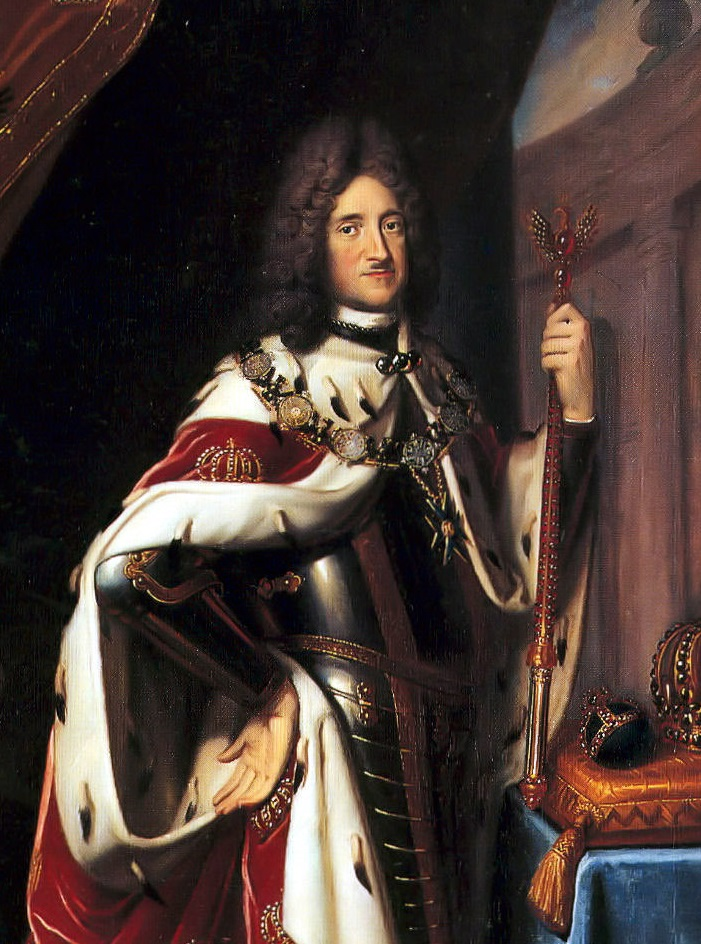
Frederick I of Prussia

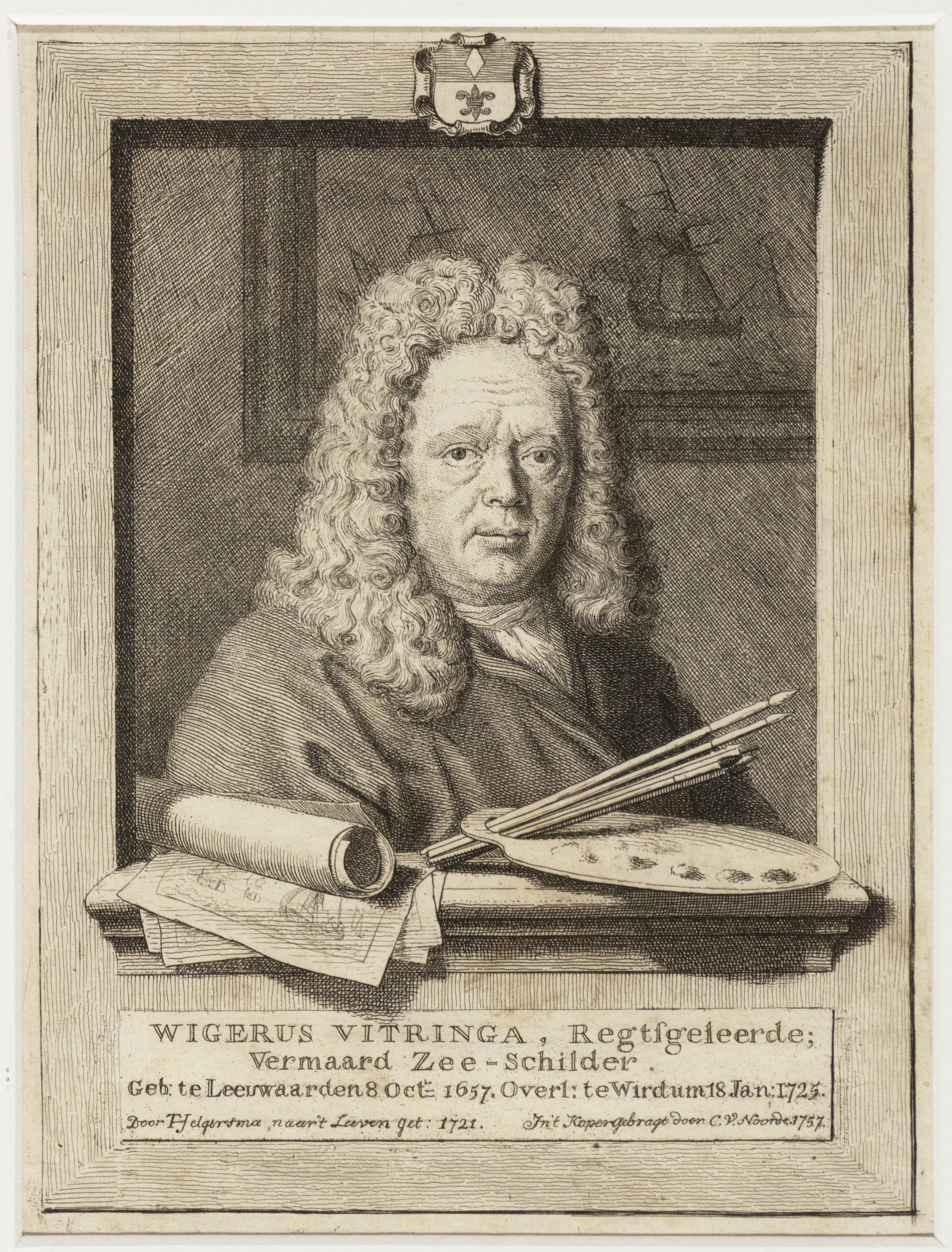
Wigerus Vitringa

- January 1 – Charles FitzCharles, 1st Earl of Plymouth, illegitimate son of King Charles II of England (d. 1680)
- January 4 – Sébastien Rale, French missionary (d. 1724)
- January 6 – William Bowes, English politician (d. 1707)
- January 11 – Elizabeth van der Woude, Dutch writer (d. 1694)
- January 17 – Pieter van Bloemen, Flemish painter (d. 1720)
- January 18 – Henry Casimir II, Prince of Nassau-Dietz, Stadholder of Friesland and Groningen (d. 1696)
- January 21 – Francesco Cupani, Italian naturalist (d. 1710)
- January 26 – William Wake, Archbishop of Canterbury (d. 1737)
- January 29 – Francis Moore, English physician and astrologer (d. 1715)
- February 10 – George Carpenter, 1st Baron Carpenter, English Army general (d. 1731)
- February 11 – Bernard Le Bovier de Fontenelle, French scientist and man of letters (d. 1757)
- February 21 – Blaise Gisbert, French Jesuit rhetorician and critic (d. 1731)
- February 24 – Clopton Havers, English physician (d. 1702)
- February 25 – Agathe de Saint-Père, French-Canadian business entrepreneur and inventor (d. 1748)
- March 1 – Samuel Werenfels, Swiss theologian (d. 1740)
- March 6 – Auguste Magdalene of Hessen-Darmstadt, German noblewoman and poet (d. 1674)
- March 18 – Giuseppe Ottavio Pitoni, Italian composer (d. 1743)
- March 19 – Jean Leclerc, Swiss theologian and biblical scholar (d. 1736)
- March 20 – Luigi Omodei (1607–1685), Italian Catholic cardinal (d. 1706)
- March 24 – Arai Hakuseki, Japanese politician and writer (d. 1725)
- April 16
  - Thomas Fairfax, 5th Lord Fairfax of Cameron, English politician (d. 1710)
  - Otto Friedrich von der Groeben, Prussian traveller, soldier and author (d. 1728)
- May 8 – Martino Altomonte, Italian painter (d. 1745)
- May 14 – Sambhaji, Maratha ruler (d. 1689)
- May 25 – Henri-Pons de Thiard de Bissy, French Catholic priest, bishop and cardinal (d. 1737)
- June 10 – James Craggs the Elder, English politician (d. 1721)
- June 14 – Sir William Blackett, 1st Baronet, of Newcastle-upon-Tyne, English politician (d. 1705)
- June 17 – Louis Ellies Dupin, French ecclesiastical historian (d. 1719)
- July 8 – Abraham de Peyster, New Amsterdam/New York politician (d. 1728)
- July 11 – King Frederick I of Prussia (d. 1713)
- July 12 – Friedrich Wilhelm III, Duke of Saxe-Altenburg (d. 1672)
- July 14 – William Cheyne, 2nd Viscount Newhaven, English politician (d. 1728)
- July 18 – Simon Digby, 4th Baron Digby, English politician (d. 1686)
- July 24
  - Theodorus Janssonius van Almeloveen, Dutch classical scholar (d. 1712)
  - Jean Mathieu de Chazelles, French hydrographer (d. 1710)
- July 25 – Philipp Heinrich Erlebach, German composer (d. 1714)
- August 7 – Henri Basnage de Beauval, French historian and lexicographer (d. 1710)
- August 9 – Pierre-Étienne Monnot, French sculptor (d. 1733)
- August 18
  - Ferdinando Galli-Bibiena, Italian architect and painter (d. 1743)
  - Antonio Margil, Spanish Franciscan missionary in North and Central America (d. 1726)
- September 14 – Sir Charles Blois, 1st Baronet, English politician (d. 1738)
- September 17
  - Dudley Cullum, English politician and baronet (d. 1720)
  - Pieter Schuyler, acting governor of the province of New York and army colonel (d. 1724)
- September 21 – Sultan Muhammad Akbar, Mughal prince (d. 1706)
- September 27 – Sofia Alekseyevna of Russia, Russian regent (d. 1704)
- September 29 – Heinrich of Saxe-Weissenfels, Count of Barby, German prince (d. 1728)
- October 2 – Guillaume Baudry, gunsmith and gold and silversmith in Lower Canada (d. 1732)
- October 4 – Francesco Solimena, Italian painter (d. 1747)
- October 8 – Wigerus Vitringa, Dutch painter (d. 1725)
- October 26 – Philipp, Duke of Saxe-Merseburg-Lauchstädt, German nobleman (d. 1690)
- November 6 – Joseph Denis, Canadian Rėcollet priest (d. 1736)
- November 12 – Anna Dorothea, Abbess of Quedlinburg (d. 1704)
- November 16 – Juliane Louise of East Frisia, Princess of East Frisia (d. 1715)
- November 26
  - William Derham, English clergyman and natural philosopher (d. 1735)
  - Michael Bernhard Valentini, German naturalist (d. 1729)
- November 28 – Philip Prospero, Prince of Asturias, heir apparent to the Spanish throne (d. 1661)
- December 2 – Franz Anton, Count of Hohenzollern-Haigerloch (d. 1702)
- December 8 – Changning, prince of the Qing dynasty (d. 1703)
- December 14 – Edmund Dunch, English Whig politician (d. 1719)
- December 15
  - Michel Richard Delalande, French composer (d. 1726)
  - Louis Thomas, Count of Soissons, Count of Soissons and Prince of Savoy (d. 1702)
- December 23
  - Hannah Duston, Massachusetts Puritan mother of 8, taken captive during King William's War (d. 1736)
  - Josiah Franklin, English-born American businessman, father of Benjamin Franklin (d. 1745)
- December 28 – Domenico Rossi, Swiss-Italian architect (d. 1737)

1658

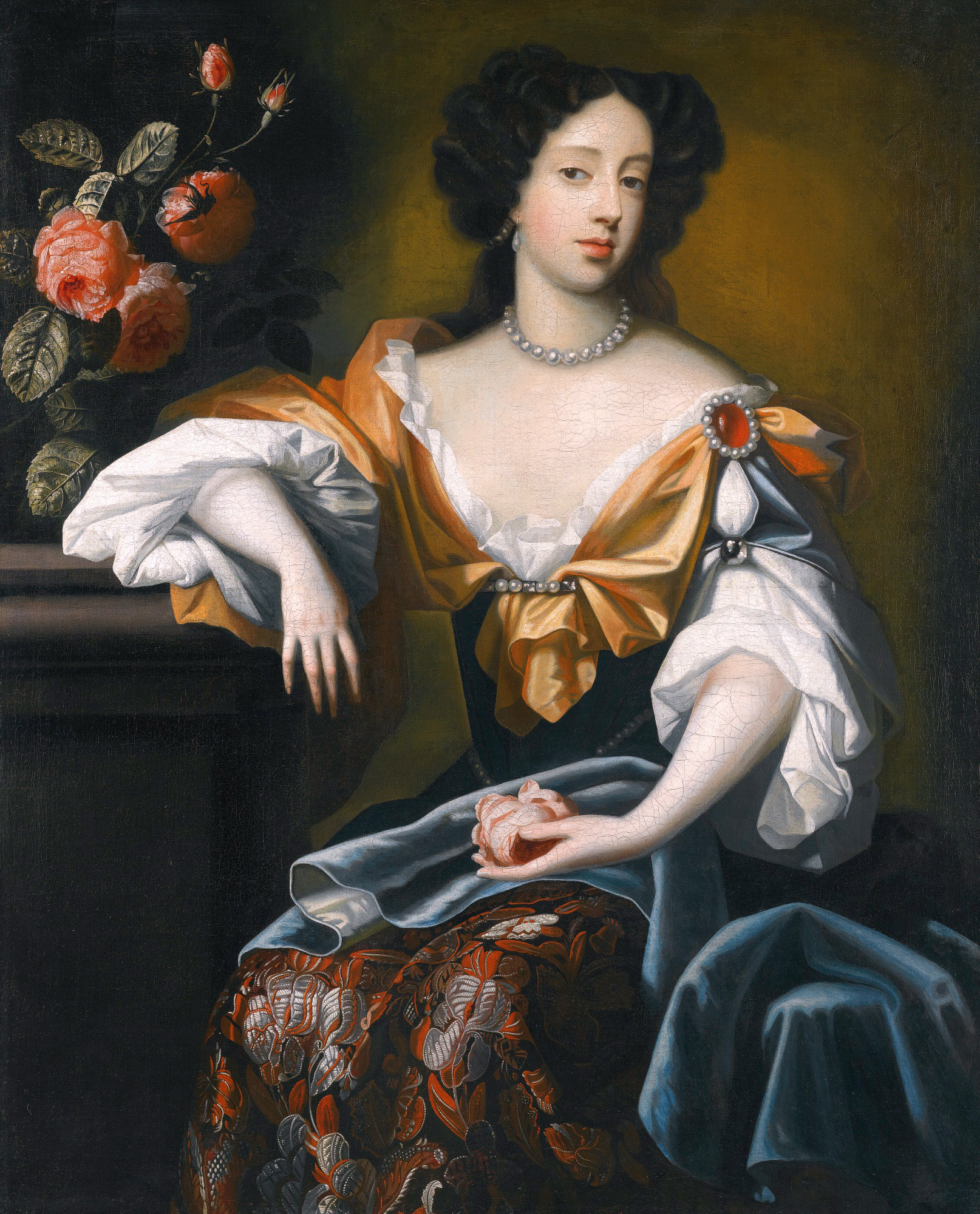
Mary of Modena

- January 9 – Nicolas Coustou, French artist (d. 1733)
- January 17 – Samson Wertheimer, European rabbi (d. 1724)
- January 17 – Francis Seymour, 5th Duke of Somerset (d. 1678)
- February 18 – Charles-Irénée Castel de Saint-Pierre, French writer (d. 1743)
- March 5 – Antoine de la Mothe Cadillac, French explorer (d. 1730)
- March 8 – Thomas Trevor, 1st Baron Trevor, British Baron (d. 1730)
- March 23 – Jean-Baptiste Santerre, French painter (d. 1717)
- March 30 – Muro Kyūsō, Japanese Neo-Confucian scholar (d. 1734)
- April 11 – James Hamilton, 4th Duke of Hamilton, Scottish peer (d. 1712)
- April 19 – Johann Wilhelm, Elector Palatine, German noble (d. 1716)
- April 22 – Giuseppe Torelli, Italian violist, violinist, pedagogue and composer (d. 1709)
- May 30 – Sir Henry Furnese, 1st Baronet, English merchant and politician (d. 1712)
- June 10 – John March, Massachusetts businessman, colonel (d. 1712)
- June 11 – Victor Honoré Janssens, Flemish painter (d. 1736)
- June 22 – Louis VII, Landgrave of Hesse-Darmstadt (d. 1678)
- July 10 – Luigi Ferdinando Marsili, Italian soldier and naturalist (d. 1730)
- July 14 – Camillo Rusconi, Italian artist (d. 1728)
- July 17 – Diogo de Mendonça Corte-Real, Portuguese politician (d. 1736)
- July 21 – Alexis Littré, French physician and anatomist (d. 1726)
- July 25 – Archibald Campbell, 1st Duke of Argyll, Scottish privy councillor (d. 1703)
- July 28 – Roelof Diodati, Dutch Governor of Mauritius (d. 1723)
- August 1 – Pierre Joseph Garidel, French botanist (d. 1737)
- August 5 – Claude Audran III, French painter (d. 1734)
- August 10 – Susanne Maria von Sandrart, German engraver (d. 1716)
- August 11 – Sir Justinian Isham, 4th Baronet, English baronet and Member of Parliament (d. 1730)
- August 16 – Jan Frans van Son, Flemish Baroque painter (d. 1704)
- August 16 – Ralph Thoresby, British historian (d. 1725)
- August 18 – Jan František Beckovský, Czech historian (d. 1722)
- August 22 – John Ernest IV, Duke of Saxe-Coburg-Saalfeld (d. 1729)
- August 28 – Honoré Tournély, French theologian (d. 1729)
- September 1 – Jacques Bernard, French theologian and publicist (d. 1718)
- September 16 – John Dennis, English dramatist and critic (d. 1734)
- September 24 – Sir Robert Anstruther, 1st Baronet, Scottish politician (d. 1737)
- September 30 – Elisabeth Eleonore of Brunswick-Wolfenbüttel, Duchess consort of Saxe-Meiningen (d. 1729)
- October 2 – Nicholas Roosevelt (1658–1742), Dutch-American politician (d. 1742)
- October 5 – Mary of Modena, queen of James II of England (d. 1718)
- October 11 – Christian Heinrich Postel, German jurist (d. 1705)
- October 18 – Alexander of Courland, German prince (d. 1686)
- October 19 – Adolphus Frederick II, Duke of Mecklenburg-Strelitz (d. 1704)
- October 21 – Henri de Boulainvilliers, French nobleman (d. 1722)
- October 24 – Marko Gerbec, Carniolan physician, scientist (d. 1718)
- November 2 – Baptist Noel (MP), English politician (d. 1690)
- November 4 – Sulkhan-Saba Orbeliani, Georgian prince, writer, monk and author (d. 1725)
- November 21 – Johann Gottfried Roesner, Prussian burgomaster (d. 1724)
- November 27 – Tsarevna Catherine Alekseyevna of Russia, daughter of Tsar Alexis of Russia (d. 1718)
- November 27 – Hercule-Louis Turinetti, marquis of Prié (d. 1726)
- December 2 – Sir Thomas Roberts, 4th Baronet, English politician (d. 1706)
- December 10 – Lancelot Blackburne, Archbishop of York (d. 1743)
- date unknown – Elizabeth Barry, English actress (d. 1713)

1659

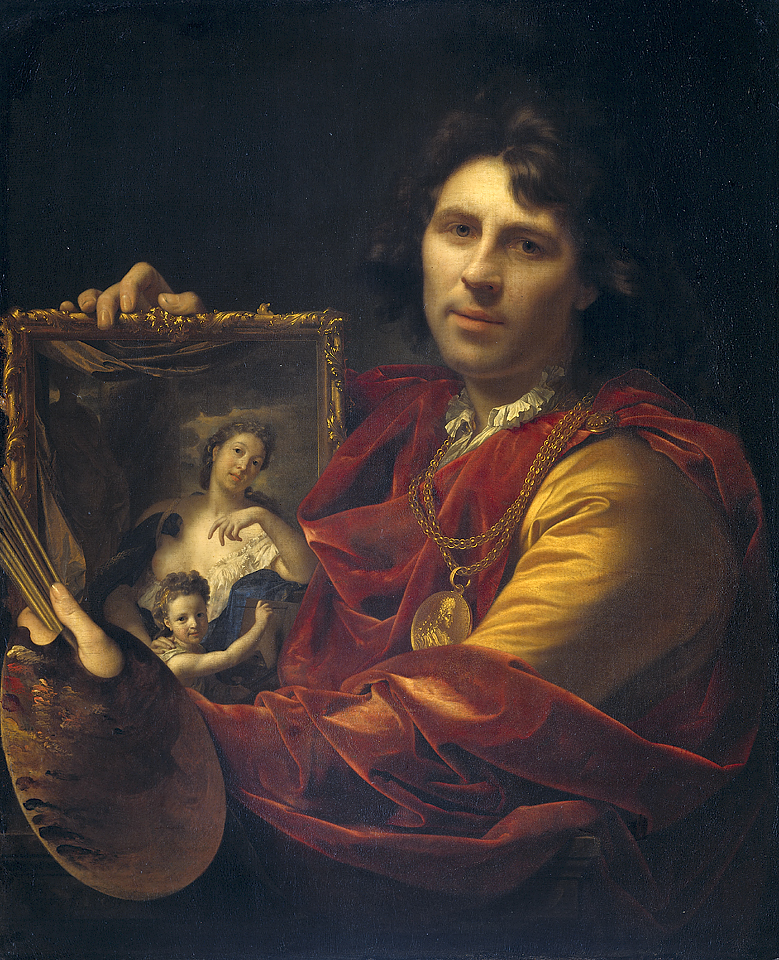
Adriaen van der Werff

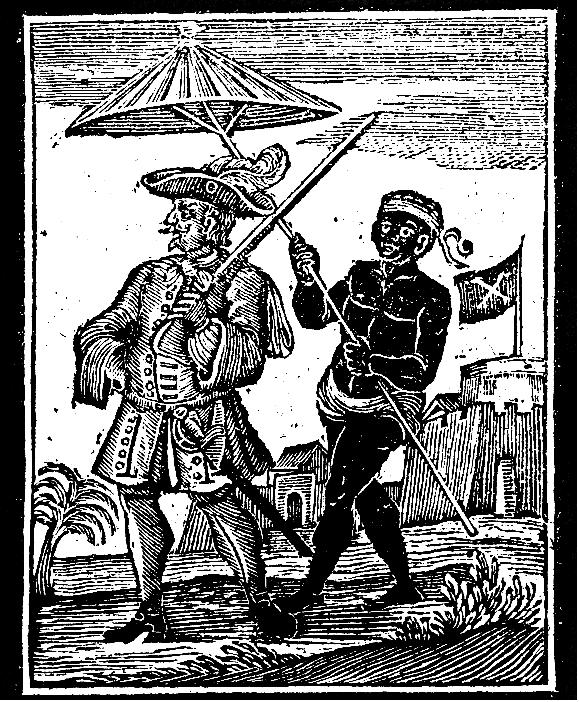
Henry Every

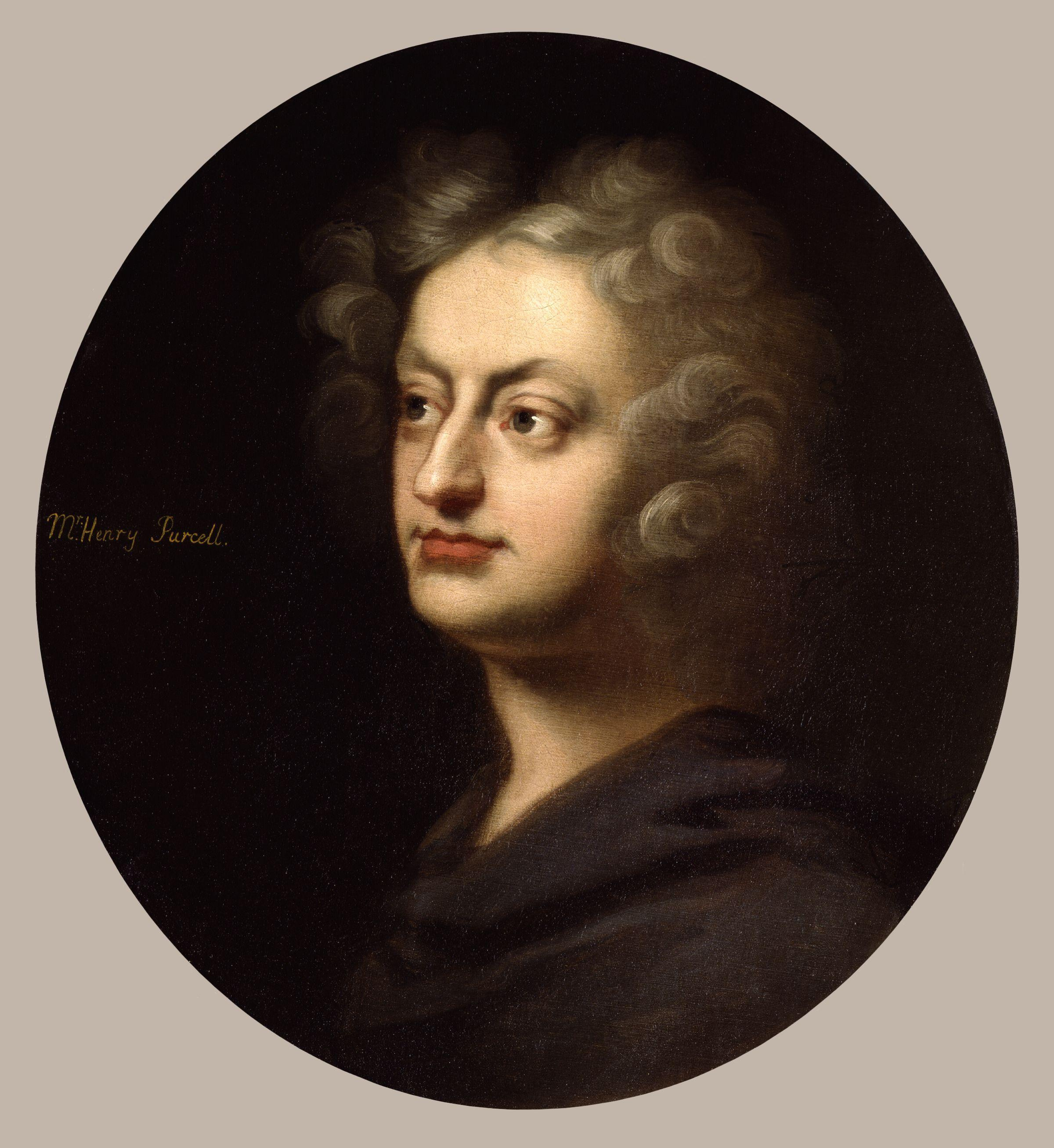
Henry Purcell

- January 1 – Margaret Wemyss, 3rd Countess of Wemyss, Scottish noble (d. 1705)
- January 4 – James Pierpont, Connecticut Congregationalist minister, a founder of Yale University (d. 1714)
- January 11 – Ambrose Browne, English politician (d. 1688)
- January 13 – Johann Arnold Nering, German architect (d. 1695)
- January 17
  - Takatsukasa Kanehiro, Japanese court noble of the Edo period (d. 1725)
  - Antonio Veracini, Italian composer (d. 1745)
- January 18 – Damaris Cudworth Masham, English philosopher (d. 1708)
- January 21 – Adriaen van der Werff, Dutch painter (d. 1722)
- January 28 – Sir Samuel Barnardiston, 2nd Baronet, English politician (d. 1709)
- February 1 – Jacob Roggeveen, Dutch Pacific Ocean explorer (d. 1729)
- February 14 – Theodore Eustace, Count Palatine of Sulzbach (d. 1732)
- February 27 – William Sherard, English botanist (d. 1728)
- March 4 – Pierre Lepautre (1659–1744), French sculptor (d. 1744)
- March 6 – Salomon Franck, German lawyer, scientist and poet (d. 1725)
- March 8 – Isaac de Beausobre, French Protestant pastor (d. 1738)
- March 25 – John Asgill, Irish politician (d. 1738)
- March 26 – William Wollaston, English philosopher (d. 1724)
- April 8 – Christopher Tancred, English politician (d. 1705)
- April 14
  - Albrecht of Saxe-Weissenfels, German prince (d. 1692)
  - William Delaune, English academic administrator and clergyman (d. 1728)
- April 15 – Adam Ludwig Lewenhaupt, Swedish general (d. 1719)
- April 16 – Jacques le Moyne de Sainte-Hélène, Canadian soldier (d. 1690)
- April 29
  - Sophia Elisabet Brenner, Swedish writer (d. 1730)
  - Date Tsunamura, Japanese daimyō at the center of the Date Sōdō (d. 1719)
- May 4 – John Dunton, English bookseller and author (d. 1733)
- June 3 – David Gregory, Scottish mathematician and astronomer (d. 1708)
- June 5 – Wolfgang George Frederick von Pfalz-Neuburg, German bishop (d. 1683)
- June 7 – Henry Thompson (1659–1700), English politician and landowner (d. 1700)
- June 11 – Yamamoto Tsunetomo, Japanese samurai (d. 1719)
- June 15 – Claude de Ramezay, Canadian politician (d. 1724)
- June 22 – Simon-Pierre Denys de Bonaventure, French officer and governor of Acadia (d. 1711)
- June 26 – Sir John Brownlow, 3rd Baronet, English politician (d. 1697)
- July 3 – Franz Beer, Austrian architect (d. 1726)
- July 6 – Albert Wolfgang, Count of Hohenlohe-Langenburg (d. 1715)
- July 8 – Justus van Huysum, Dutch painter (d. 1716)
- July 14 – John Hutton (1659–1731), English politician (d. 1731)
- July 16 – Anne Wharton, English poet (d. 1685)
- July 18 – Hyacinthe Rigaud, French painter (d. 1743)
- July 22 – Noadiah Russell, American colonial clergyman, a founder of Yale University (d. 1713)
- July 28
  - Asano Tsunanaga, Japanese daimyō, ruler of the Hiroshima Domain (d. 1708)
  - Charles Ancillon, French Protestant pastor (d. 1715)
- August 1 – Sebastiano Ricci, Italian painter (d. 1734)
- August 2 – Andrew Archer, English politician (d. 1741)
- August 17 – Robert Challe, French colonialist (d. 1721)
- August 20 – Henry Every, English pirate (d. after 1696)
- September 1 – Domenico Egidio Rossi, Italian architect (d. 1715)
- September 5 – Michel Sarrazin, Canadian scientist (d. 1734)
- September 10 – Henry Purcell, English composer (d. 1695)
- September 12
  - Dirk Maas, Dutch painter (d. 1717)
  - Ferdinand Willem, Duke of Württemberg-Neuenstadt, Dutch general and noble (d. 1701)
- September 13 – Claud Hamilton, 4th Earl of Abercorn, Scottish and Irish peer (k. in action 1691)
- September 18 – Caleb Banks, English politician (d. 1696)
- October 13 – George Verney, 12th Baron Willoughby de Broke, English peer and clergyman (d. 1728)
- October 22 – Georg Ernst Stahl, German chemist (d. 1734)
- October 28 – Nicholas Brady (poet), English poet and Anglican clergyman (d. 1726)
- November 3 – Hui-bin Jang, Korean royal consort (d. 1701)
- November 10 – Albert Borgard, Danish artillery and engineer officer (d. 1751)
- November 19 – Jacques-Louis de Valon, French poet (d. 1719)
- December 2 – John Brereton, 4th Baron Brereton, Irish peer (d. 1718)
- December 12 – Francesco Galli Bibiena, Italian architect/designer (d. 1739)
- December 18 – Matthieu Petit-Didier, French Benedictine theologian (d. 1728)
- December 28 – François Catrou, French historian and Jesuit priest (d. 1737)

== Deaths ==
1650

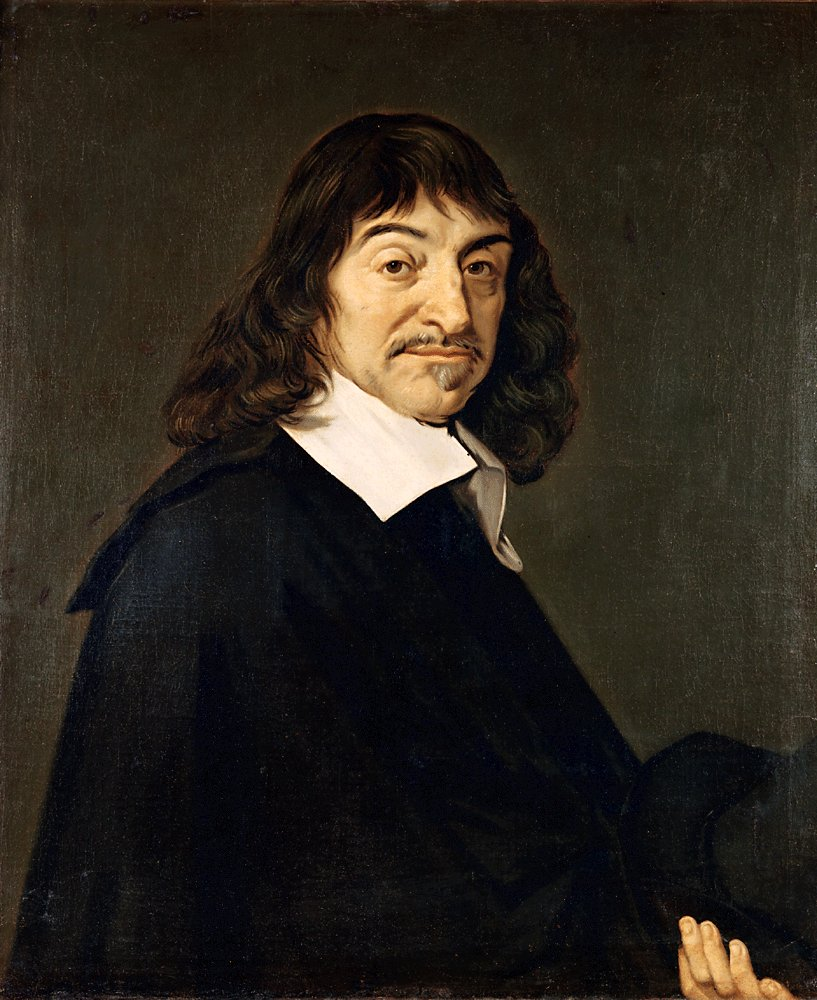
René Descartes

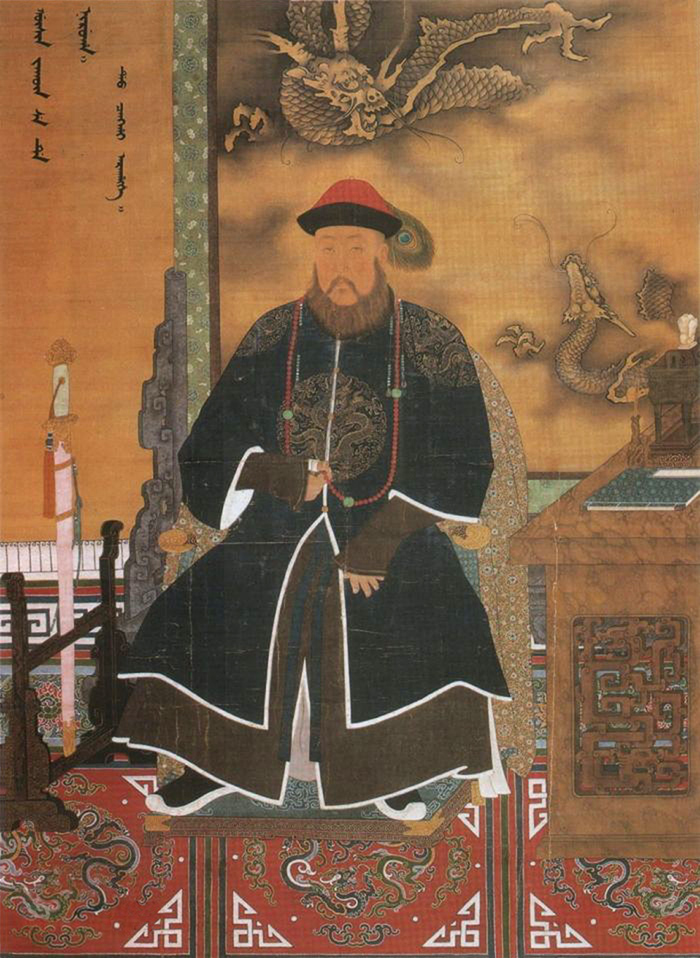
Prince Dorgon

- January 7 – Louis I, Prince of Anhalt-Köthen, German prince (b. 1579)
- January 18 – Matteo Rosselli, Italian painter (b. 1578)
- January 23 – Philip Herbert, 4th Earl of Pembroke (b. 1584)
- February 11
  - René Descartes, French philosopher (b. 1596)
  - Adriaen van Gaesbeeck, Dutch painter of genre subjects and portraits (b. 1621)
- February 26 – Claude Favre de Vaugelas, Savoyard grammarian and man of letters (b. 1585)
- March 8 – Antonio Tornielli, Italian Catholic prelate (b. 1579)
- March 11 – John Henderson, 5th of Fordell, Scottish noble (b. 1605)
- March 16 – Sophie Elisabeth of Brandenburg, Duchess consort of Saxe-Altenburg (b. 1616)
- March 25
  - Elisabeth of Brunswick-Wolfenbüttel, Duchess of Saxe-Altenburg (b. 1593)
  - John Williams, Welsh clergyman and political advisor to King James I (b. 1582)
- April 3 – Christian Gueintz, German teacher and writer-grammarian (b. 1592)
- April 18 – Simonds d'Ewes, English antiquarian and politician (b. 1602)
- April 21 – Yagyū Jūbei Mitsuyoshi, Japanese samurai (b. 1607)
- April 22 – Stephanius, Danish historian (b. 1599)
- May 7 – Kanō Naonobu, Japanese painter of the Kanō school of painting (b. 1607)
- May 21 – James Graham, 1st Marquess of Montrose, Scottish royalist (b. 1612)
- May 20 – Francesco Sacrati, Italian composer (b. 1605)
- May 25 – Michel Particelli d'Emery, French politician (b. 1596)
- May 28 – Agnes of Hesse-Kassel, Princess consort of Anhalt-Dessau (b. 1606)
- June 8 – Maximilian von und zu Trauttmansdorff, Austrian diplomat (b. 1584)
- June 18 – Christoph Scheiner, German astronomer (b. 1573 or 1575)
- June 19
  - Matthäus Merian, Swiss engraver (b. 1593)
  - Simon Philip, Count of Lippe-Detmold (1636–1650) (b. 1632)
- June 26 – Hedwig of Brunswick-Wolfenbüttel, Duchess consort of Pomerania (b. 1595)
- June 28 – Jean Rotrou, French poet and tragedian (b. 1609)
- June 30 – Niccolò Cabeo, Italian Jesuit writer, theologian (b. 1586)
- July 2 – Marion Delorme, French courtesan known for her relationships with the important men of her time (b. 1613)
- July 16 – Margaretha van Valckenburch, Dutch shipowner, only female member of the VOC (b. 1565)
- July 18 – Robert Levinz, English Royalist, hanged in London by Parliamentary forces as a spy (b. 1615)
- August – John Parkinson, English herbalist and botanist (b. 1567)
- August 16 – Cesare Monti, Italian cardinal, Archbishop of Milan (b. 1593)
- September 7 – Scévole de Sainte-Marthe, French historian (b. 1571)
- September 8 – Elizabeth Stuart, second daughter of King Charles I of England (b. 1635)
- September 13 – Ferdinand of Bavaria (b. 1577)
- September 14 – Josias von Rantzau, Marshal of France (b. 1609)
- September 24 – Charles de Valois, Duke of Angoulême, son of Charles IX of France (b. 1573)
- October 25 – Franciscus Quaresmius, Italian writer and orientalist (b. 1583)
- October 29 – David Calderwood, Scottish historian (b. 1575)
- November 6 – William II, Prince of Orange (b. 1626)
- November 24 – Manuel Cardoso, Portuguese composer (b. 1566)
- December 13 – (bapt.) Phineas Fletcher, English poet (b. 1582)
- December 31 – Dorgon, Manchu prince (b. 1612)
- date unknown – Catalina de Erauso, Spanish-Mexican nun and soldier (b. 1592)
  - Koçi Bey, Ottoman man of letters
  - Magdalena Andersdotter, Norwegian-Faroese shipowner (b. 1590)
  - Teofila Chmielecka, Polish military wife (b. 1590)

1651

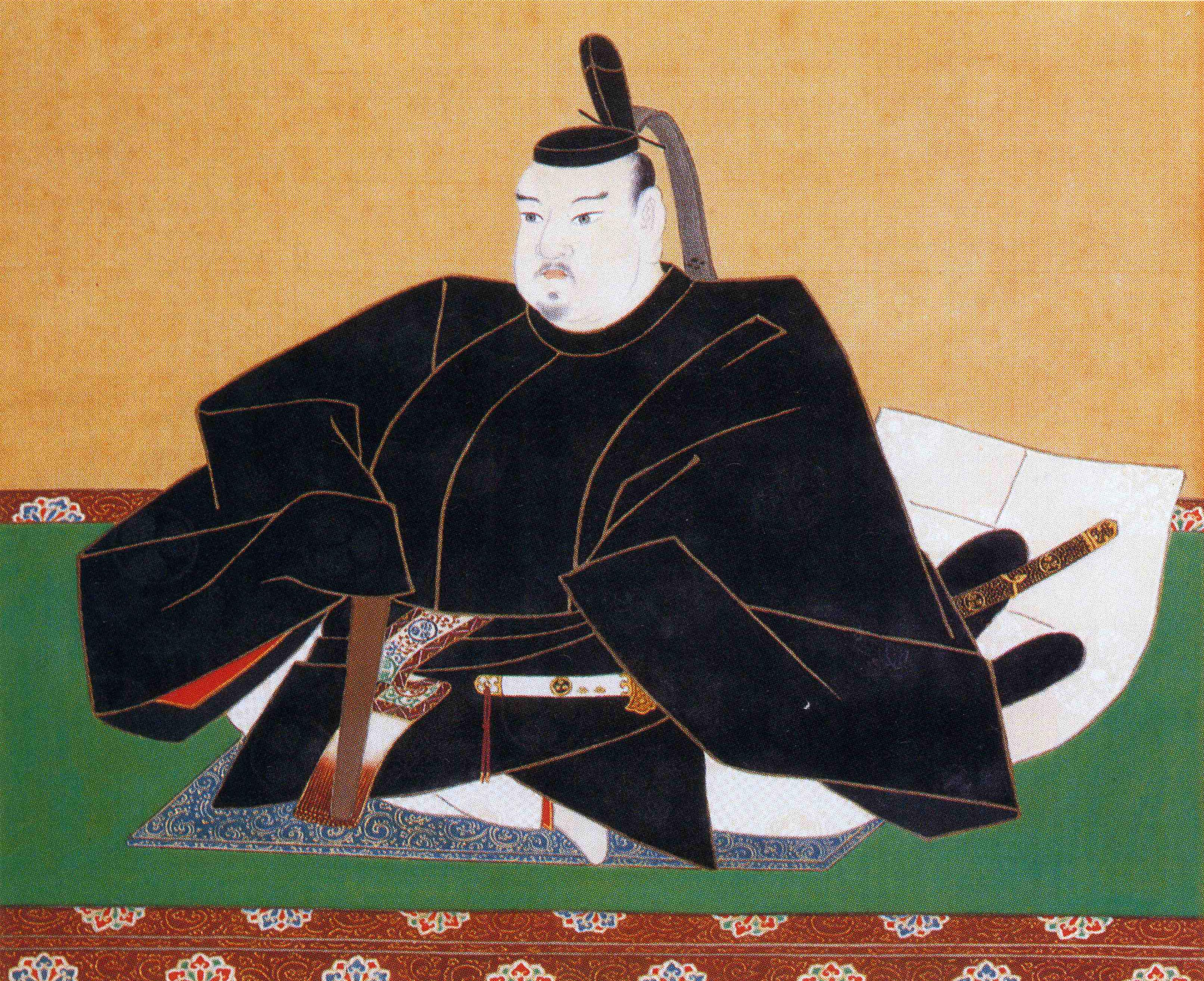
Tokugawa Iemitsu

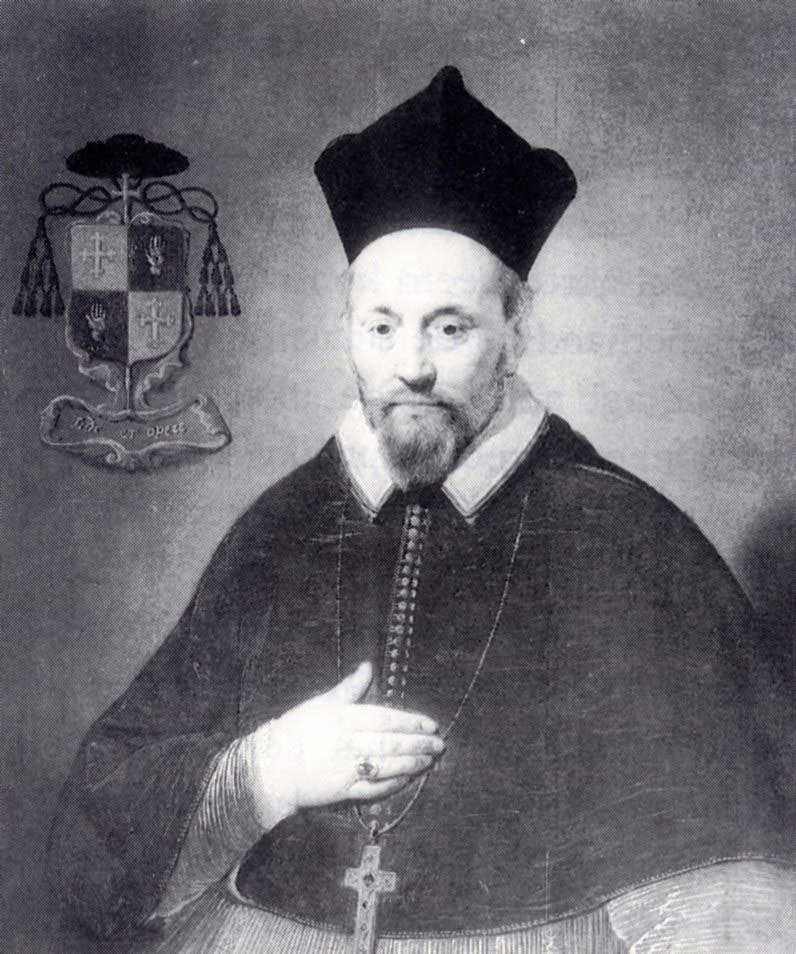
Philippus Rovenius

- January – Thomas Greene, Colonial governor of Maryland (b. 1609)
- January 22 – Johannes Phocylides Holwarda, Dutch astronomer (b. 1618)
- January 29 – Diego de Colmenares, Spanish historian (b. 1586)
- February 6 – Erdmann August of Brandenburg-Bayreuth, Hereditary Margrave (b. 1615)
- February 8 – Richard Newport, 1st Baron Newport, English politician (b. 1587)
- February 9 – Herman Krefting, Norwegian businessman (b. 1592)
- March 11 – Alvise Contarini, Italian diplomat, nobleman (b. 1597)
- April 1 – John of Hesse-Braubach, German general (b. 1609)
- April 7 – Lennart Torstensson, Swedish Field Marshal, Privy Councillour and Governor-General (b. 1603)
- April 10 – Sir William Airmine, 1st Baronet, English politician (b. 1593)
- May 16 – Sophie of Solms-Laubach, wife of Joachim Ernst, Margrave of Brandenburg-Ansbach (b. 1594)
- May 26 – Jeane Gardiner, British woman executed for witchcraft in Bermuda
- May 28 – Henry Grey, 10th Earl of Kent (b. 1594)
- June 8 – Tokugawa Iemitsu, Japanese shōgun (b. 1604)
- June 17
  - Roger North, English politician (b. 1577)
  - Francesco Piccolomini, Italian Jesuit (b. 1582)
- July 7 – Dina Vinhofvers, Danish alleged conspirator (b. 1620)
- August 1 – Maria Anna Vasa, Polish princess (b. 1650)
- August 2 – Ercole, Marquis of Baux, member of the House of Grimaldi (b. 1623)
- August 8 – Countess Amalie Elisabeth of Hanau-Münzenberg, regent of Hesse-Kassel (b. 1602)
- August 16 – Filippo Benedetto de Sio, Italian Catholic prelate and bishop (b. 1585)
- August 20 – Jeremi Wiśniowiecki, Polish nobleman (b. 1612)
- September 2
  - Kösem Sultan, regent of the Ottoman Empire (b. 1590)
  - William Widdrington, 1st Baron Widdrington, English landowner, politician (b. 1610)
- September 10 – Yui Shōsetsu, Japanese rebel (b. 1605)
- September 12
  - Félix Castello, Spanish artist (b. 1595)
  - William Hamilton, 2nd Duke of Hamilton, Scottish nobleman (b. 1616)
- September 18 – Henriette Marie of the Palatinate, German noble (b. 1626)
- September 24
  - Étienne Pascal, French mathematician (b. 1588)
  - Marubashi Chūya, Japanese rebel
- September 27 – Maximilian I, Elector of Bavaria (b. 1573)
- October 4 – Ludwig Camerarius, German politician (b. 1573)
- October 6 – Heinrich Albert, German composer and poet (b. 1604)
- October 7 – Jacques Sirmond, French Jesuit scholar (b. 1559)
- October 8
  - Isaac Elzevir, Dutch printer and publisher (b. 1596)
  - Anna Catherine Constance Vasa, Polish princess, daughter of King Sigismund III Vasa (b. 1619)
- October 10 – Philippus Rovenius, Dutch priest (b. 1573)
- October 15 – James Stanley, 7th Earl of Derby (b. 1607)
- October 25 – Saint Job of Pochayiv, Ukrainian Orthodox Christian saint (b. 1551)
- November 20 – Mikołaj Potocki, Polish soldier (b. 1595)
- November 22 – Francis Scott, 2nd Earl of Buccleuch, son of Walter Scott (b. 1626)
- November 26 – Henry Ireton, English Civil War leader (b. 1611)
- December 14 – Pierre Dupuy, French scholar (b. 1582)
- December 15 – Virginia Centurione Bracelli, Italian saint (b. 1587)
- November 18 – Anna Amalia of Baden-Durlach, Regent of Nassau-Saarbrücken (b. 1595)
- December 18 – William Brabazon, 1st Earl of Meath (b. 1580)
- date unknown
  - Eva Bacharach, Bohemian Hebraist (b. 1580)
  - Giulia Tofana, Italian poisoner (b. 1581)
  - Angélique Paulet, French salonnière, singer, musician and actress (b. 1592)
  - Helena Czaplińska, Ukrainian Hetmana

1652

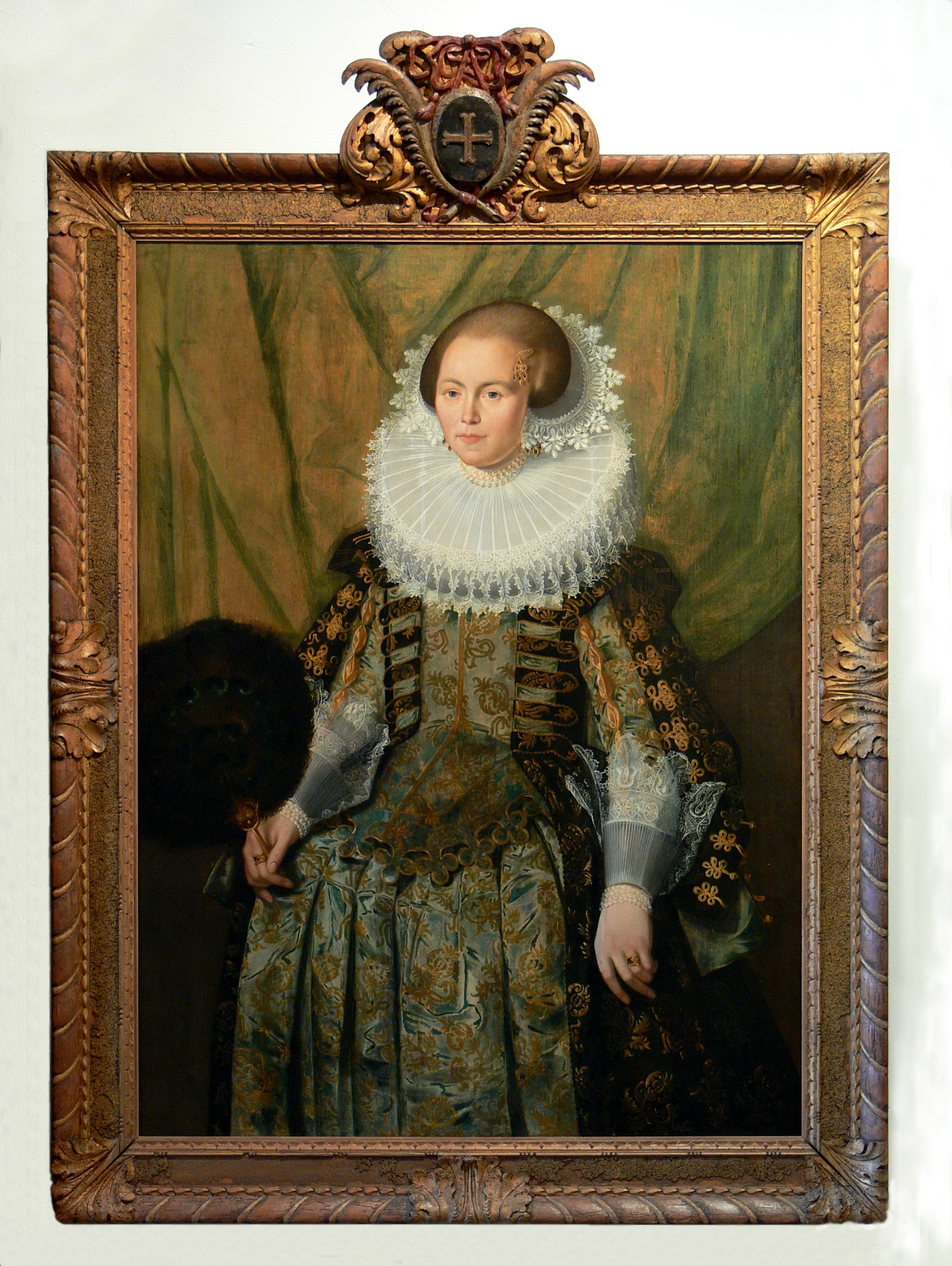
Eva Ment

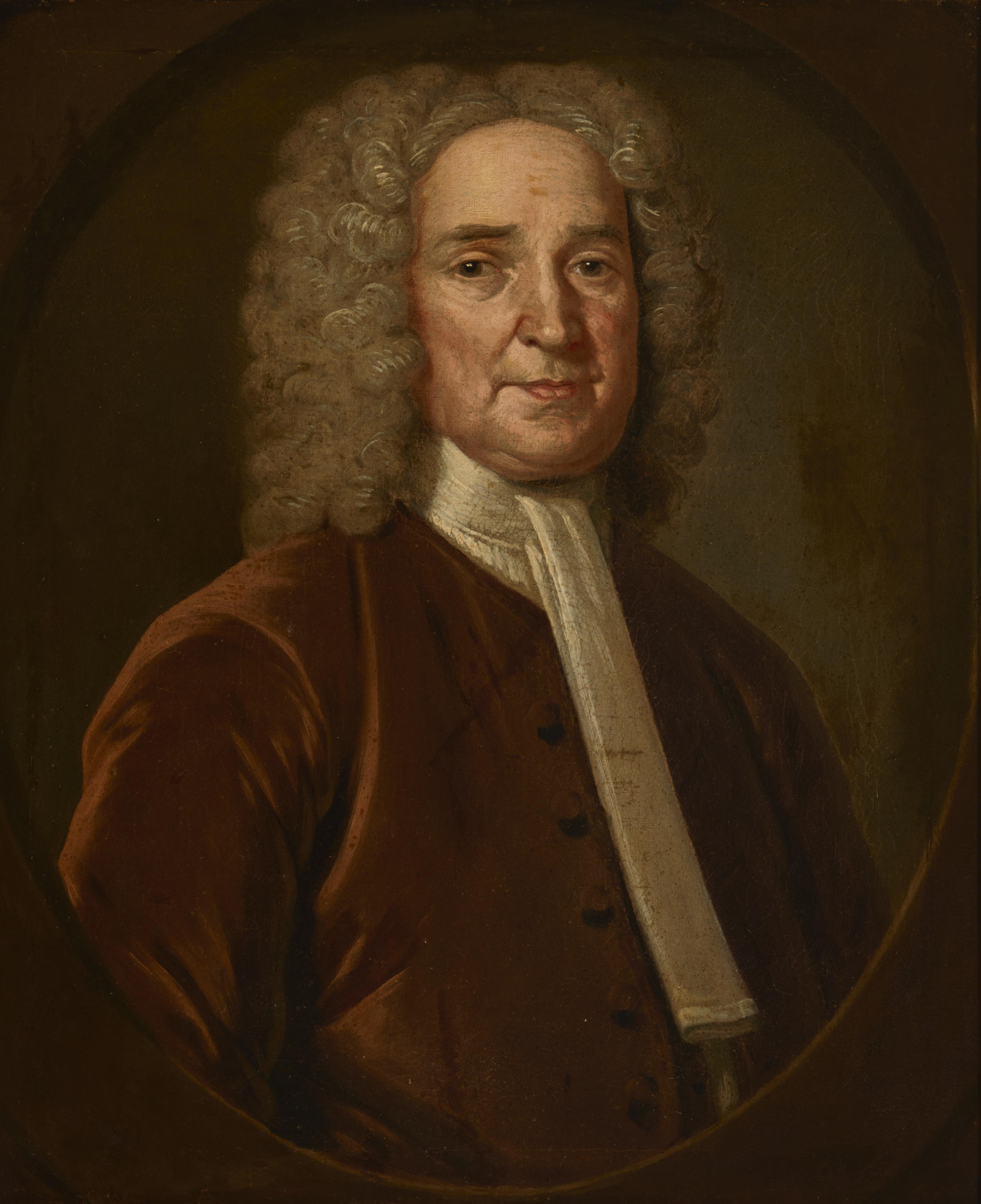
John Cotton

- January 19 – Vilem Slavata of Chlum, Czech nobleman (b. 1572)
- January 30 – Georges de La Tour, French Baroque painter (b. 1593)
- February 7 – Gregorio Allegri, Italian composer (b. 1582)
- February 28 – Arcangela Tarabotti, Venetian nun and feminist (b. 1604)
- March 12 – Aloysius Gottifredi, Italian Jesuit (b. 1595)
- March 17 – Benjamin Bramer, German mathematician (b. 1588)
- April 13 – Georges Fournier, French Jesuit mathematician and geographer (b. 1595)
- April 17 – Henry Howard, 22nd Earl of Arundel, English politician (b. 1608)
- April 19 – Jesper Brochmand, Danish bishop (b. 1585)
- April 21 – Pietro Della Valle, Italian traveller (b. 1586)
- April 26 – Jean-Pierre Camus, French Catholic bishop (b. 1584)
- May 11 (bur.) – Eva Ment, Dutch culture personality (b. 1606)
- May 10
  - Jacques Buteux, French missionary (b. 1600)
  - Jacques-Nompar de Caumont, duc de La Force, Marshal of France (b. 1558)
- June 3 – Marek Sobieski, Polish noble (szlachcic) (b. 1628)
- June 9
  - Anna Sophie of Anhalt, German noblewoman (b. 1584)
  - Jean Dolbeau, French missionary (b. 1586)
- June 18 – John Casimir, Count Palatine of Kleeburg, son of John I (b. 1589)
- June 21 – Inigo Jones, English architect (b. 1573)
- June 25 – Abraham von Franckenberg, German writer (b. 1593)
- July 14 – Otto Heurnius, Dutch physician and philosopher (b. 1577)
- July 23 – Johannes Chrysostomus vander Sterre, Dutch abbot, ecclesiastical writer (b. 1591)
- July 25 – Bonaventura Peeters the Elder, Flemish marine painter (b. 1614)
- July 30 – Charles Amadeus, Duke of Nemours (b. 1624)
- August 9 – Frédéric Maurice de La Tour d'Auvergne, prince of the independent principality of Sedan (b. 1605)
- August 10 – Jean Gaston, Duke of Valois (b. 1650)
- August 14 – Abraham Elzevir, Dutch printer (b. 1592)
- August 18 – Florimond de Beaune, French mathematician and jurist (b. 1601)
- August 22 – Jacob De la Gardie, Swedish soldier and statesman (b. 1583)
- August 23 – John Byron, 1st Baron Byron, English royalist politician (b. 1600)
- September 2 – Jusepe de Ribera, Spanish Tenebrist painter and printmaker (b. 1591)
- September 6 – Philippe Alegambe, Belgian Jesuit priest and bibliographer (b. 1592)
- September 7 – Patrick Young, Scottish librarian (b. 1584)
- September 16 – Giulio Roma, Italian Catholic cardinal (b. 1584)
- September 17 – Sumitomo Masatomo (b. 1585)
- October 8 – John Greaves, English mathematician and antiquarian (b. 1602)
- October 11 – Léon Bouthillier, comte de Chavigny, French politician (b. 1608)
- October 20 – Antonio Coello, Spanish writer (b. 1611)
- November 4 – Jean-Charles della Faille, Belgian mathematician (b. 1597)
- November 7 – Henry of Nassau-Siegen, German count, officer in the Dutch Army, diplomat for the Dutch Republic (b. 1611)
- November 11 – John Bridgeman, British bishop (b. 1577)
- November 21 – Jan Brożek, Polish mathematician, physician, and astronomer (b. 1585)
- December 11 – Denis Pétau, French theologian and historian (b. 1583)
- December 23 – John Cotton, founder of Boston, Massachusetts (b. 1585)
- date unknown
  - Johannes Gysius – Dutch historian (b. circa 1583)
  - Prince Luarsab of Kartli – heir apparent to the throne of the Kingdom of Kartli

1653

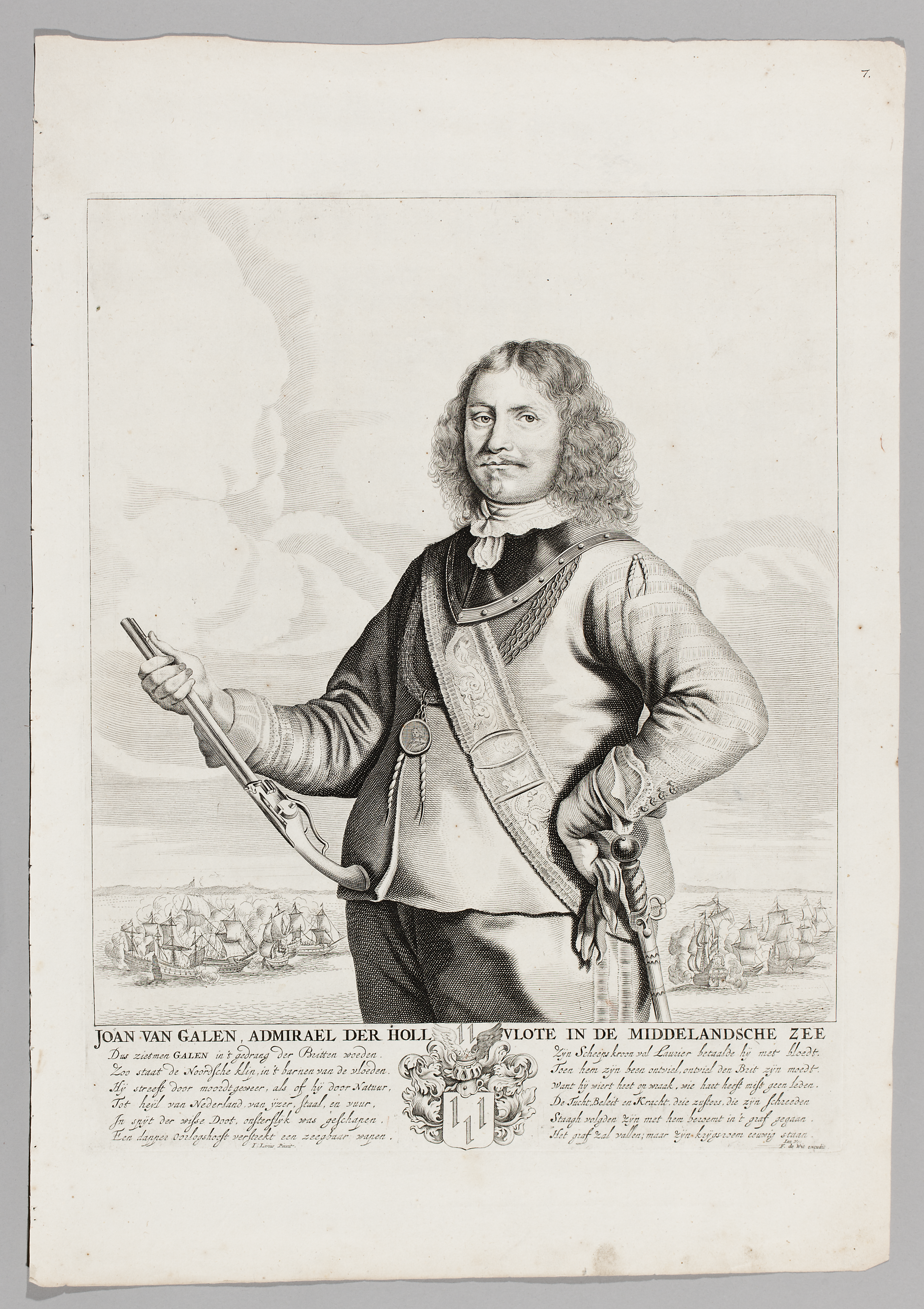
Johan van Galen

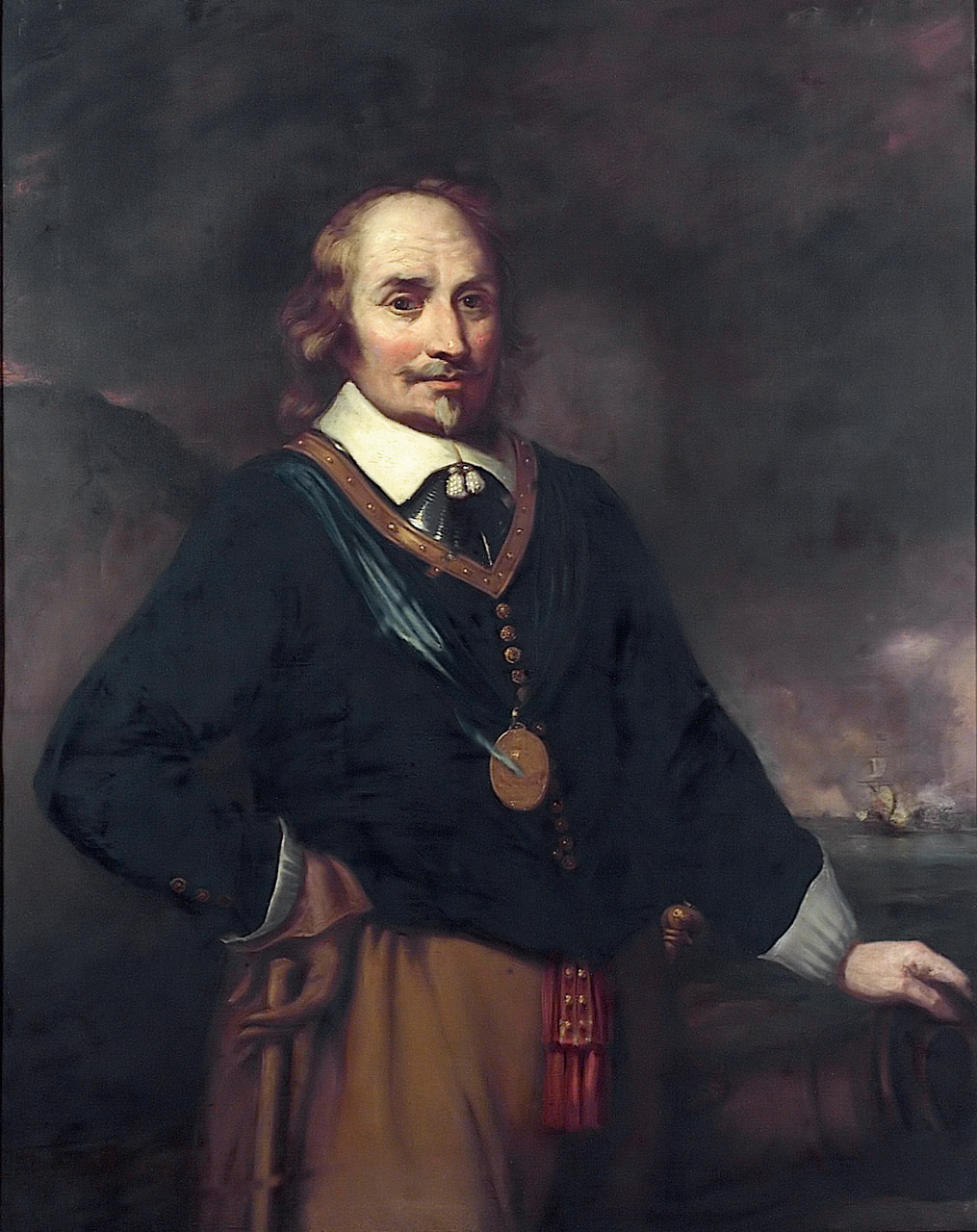
Maarten Tromp

- January 14 – George Rudolf of Liegnitz, Polish noble (b. 1595)
- January 21 – John Digby, 1st Earl of Bristol, English diplomat (b. 1580)
- February 13 – Georg Rudolf Weckherlin, German poet (b. 1584)
- February 16 – Johannes Schultz, German composer (b. 1582)
- February 20 – Luigi Rossi, Italian composer (b. 1597)
- February 21 – Adriaan Pauw, Grand Pensionary of Holland (b. 1585)
- February 27 – Diego López Pacheco, 7th Duke of Escalona, Spanish noble (b. 1599)
- March 6 – Juan de Dicastillo, Spanish theologian (b. 1584)
- March 23 – Johan van Galen, Dutch naval officer (b. 1604)
- May 13 – Teodósio, Prince of Brazil, Portuguese prince (b. 1634)
- May 26 – Robert Filmer, English writer (b. 1588)
- March 10 – Count John Louis of Nassau-Hadamar (b. 1590)
- March 25 – Nicholas Martyn, English politician (b. 1593)
- March 30 – Mikołaj Łęczycki, Polish Jesuit (b. 1574)
- April 20 – Celestyn Myślenta, Polish theologian (b. 1588)
- April 26 – Matthias Faber, German Jesuit priest and writer (b. 1586)
- May 11 – Petronio Veroni, Roman Catholic prelate, Bishop of Boiano (1652–1653) (b. 1600)
- May 19 – Elizabeth Lucretia, Duchess of Cieszyn, Duchess suo jure of Cieszyn (b. 1599)
- June 5 – Federico Baldissera Bartolomeo Cornaro, Italian Catholic cardinal (b. 1579)
- June 26 – Juliana Morell, Spanish-French scholar (b. 1594)
- July 10 – Gabriel Naudé, French librarian and scholar (b. 1600)
- July 31 – Thomas Dudley, Governor of Massachusetts Bay Colony (b. 1576)
- August 10 – Maarten Tromp, Dutch admiral (b. 1598)
- August 22 – Augustus, Prince of Anhalt-Plötzkau, German prince (b. 1575)
- September 3 – Claudius Salmasius, French classical scholar (b. 1588)
- September 14 – Wolfgang Wilhelm, Count Palatine of Neuburg, Duke of Jülich and Berg (b. 1578)
- September 26 – Charles de l'Aubespine, marquis de Châteauneuf, French diplomat and government official (b. 1580)
- October 3 – Marcus Zuerius van Boxhorn, Dutch scholar (b. 1612)
- October 7 – Fausto Poli, Italian Catholic prelate and cardinal (b. 1581)
- October 22 – Thomas de Critz, British artist (b. 1607)
- October 25 – Gustav, Count of Vasaborg, illegitimate son of King Gustavus Adolphus and his mistress Margareta Slots (b. 1616)
- November 17 – Joana, Princess of Beira, Portuguese infanta (princess) (b. 1635)
- December 7 – Ludwig Crocius, German Calvinist minister (b. 1586)
- December 21 – Elisabeth of Schleswig-Holstein-Sonderburg, Duchess consort of Pomerania (b. 1580)
- December 28 – Giovanni Battista Rinuccini, archbishop of Fermo (b. 1592)
- date unknown
  - Lucrezia Marinella, Italian poet and author (b. 1571)
  - Jusepa Vaca, Spanish stage actress (b. 1589)
  - Constantia Zierenberg, German-Polish singer (b. 1605)
  - George Skutt, English merchant and politician

1654

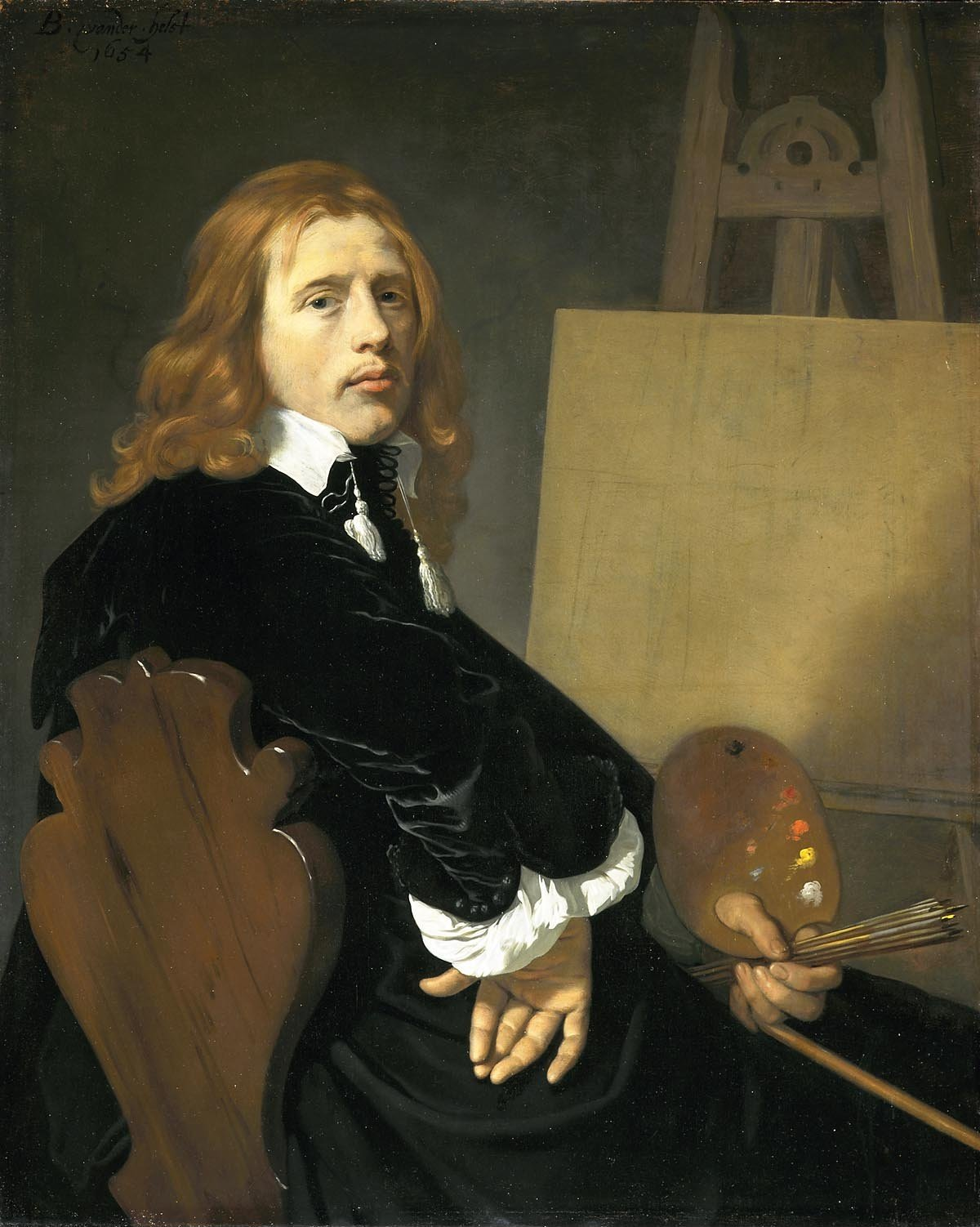
Paulus Potter

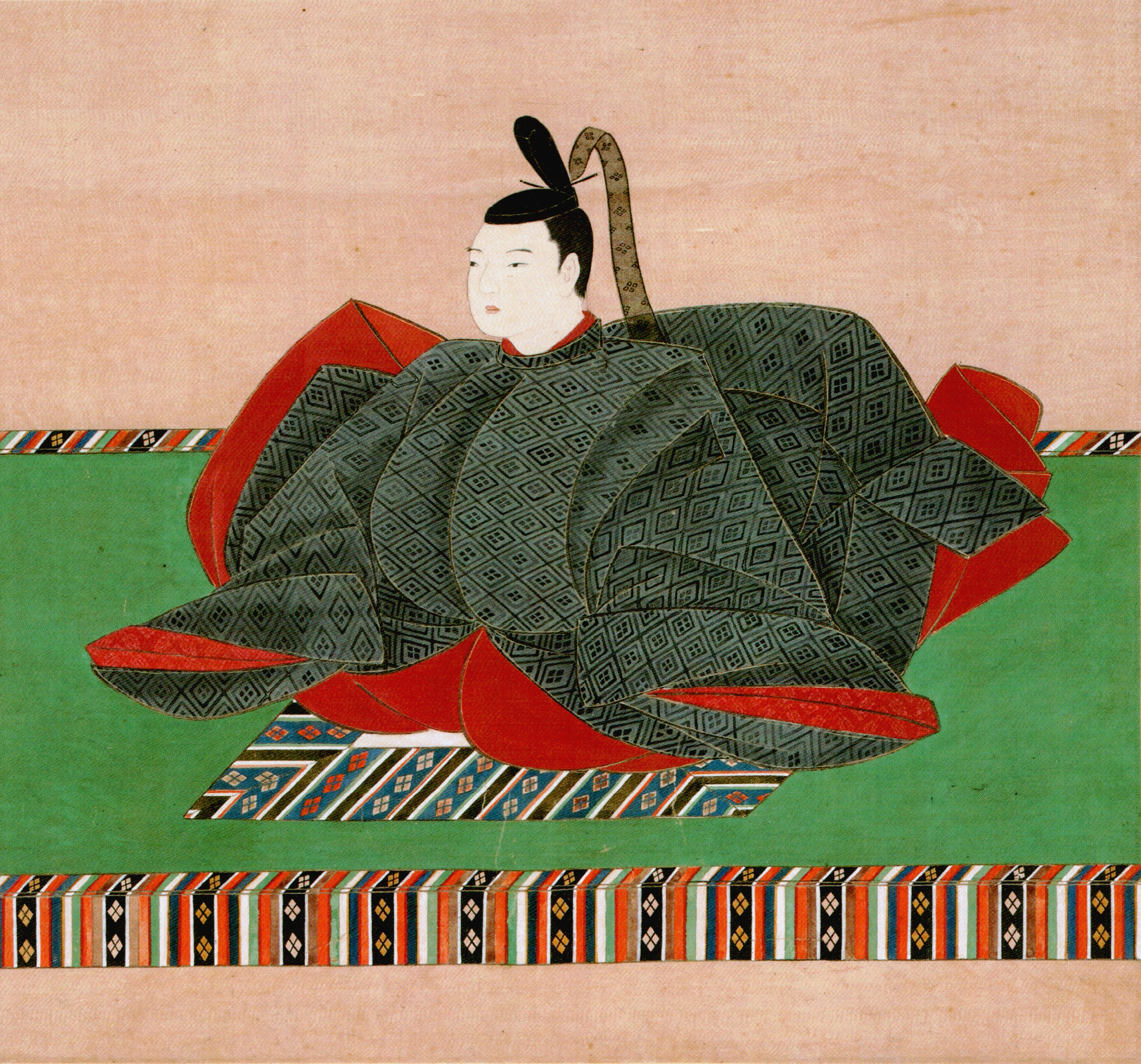
Emperor Go-Kōmyō

- January 10 – Nicholas Culpeper, English botanist (b. 1616)
- January 17 – Paulus Potter, Dutch painter (b. 1625)
- February 6 – Francesco Mochi, Italian early-Baroque sculptor (b. 1580)
- February 8 – Luca Ferrari, Italian painter (b. 1605)
- February 18 – Jean-Louis Guez de Balzac, French writer (b. 1594)
- March 7 – Ernest Gottlieb, Prince of Anhalt-Plötzkau (b. 1620)
- March 14 – Jan van Balen, Flemish painter (b. 1611)
- March 15 – Jean Guiton, French Huguenot ship owner (b. 1585)
- March 19 – Matsudaira Norinaga, Japanese daimyō (b. 1600)
- March 22 – Théodore de Mayerne, Swiss physician (b. 1573)
- March 24 – Samuel Scheidt, German composer (b. 1587)
- March 30 – Aleksander Ludwik Radziwiłł, Polish noble (b. 1594)
- April 5 – Jacobus Trigland, Dutch theologian (b. 1583)
- May 18 – Muhammad Qadiri, Punjabi founder of the Naushahia branch of the Qadri Order (b. 1552)
- May 21 – Elizabeth Poole, English settler in Plymouth Colony (b. 1588)
- May 31 – Hippolytus Guarinonius, Italian physician and polymath (b. 1571)
- June 10 – Alessandro Algardi, Italian sculptor and architect (b. 1598)
- June 14 – Dániel Esterházy, Hungarian noble (b. 1585)
- June 27 – Johannes Valentinus Andreae, German theologian (b. 1586)
- July 9 – Ferdinand IV, King of the Romans (b. 1633)
- July 23 – Orazio Grassi, Italian Jesuit priest, architect and scientist (b. 1583)
- August 12 – Cornelius Haga, Dutch diplomat (b. 1578)
- August 19 – Yom-Tov Lipmann Heller, Bohemian rabbi and liturgical poet (b. 1579)
- August 28 – Axel Oxenstierna, Lord High Chancellor of Sweden since 1612 (b. 1583)
- August 29 – Wouter van Twiller, Director-General of New Netherland from 1633 until 1638 (b. 1606)
- August 31 – Ole Worm, Danish physician and antiquary (b. 1588)
- September 6 – Christian I, Count Palatine of Birkenfeld-Bischweiler (1600–1654) (b. 1598)
- September 8 – Peter Claver, Spanish Jesuit priest (b. 1580)
- September 27 – Louis, Duke of Joyeuse, younger son of Charles (b. 1622)
- September 29 – George John II, Count Palatine of Lützelstein-Guttenberg (b. 1586)
- October 12 – Carel Fabritius, Dutch artist (b. 1622)
- October 16 – Hercule, Duke of Montbazon (b. 1568)
- October 20 – Sir Thomas Jervoise, English politician (b. 1587)
- October 30 – Emperor Go-Kōmyō of Japan (b. 1633)
- November 27 – Pieter Meulener, Flemish Baroque painter (b. 1602)
- November 26 – Giambattista Altieri, Italian Catholic cardinal (b. 1589)
- November 30
  - John Selden, English jurist (b. 1584)
  - William Habington, English poet (b. 1605)
- December 1 – Jakov Mikalja, Italian linguist and lexicographer (b. 1601)
- December 4 – Sir Christopher Yelverton, 1st Baronet, English politician (b. 1602)
- December 5 – Jean François Sarrazin, French writer (b. c. 1611)
- date unknown – Elizabeth Isham, English diarist (b. 1609)

1655

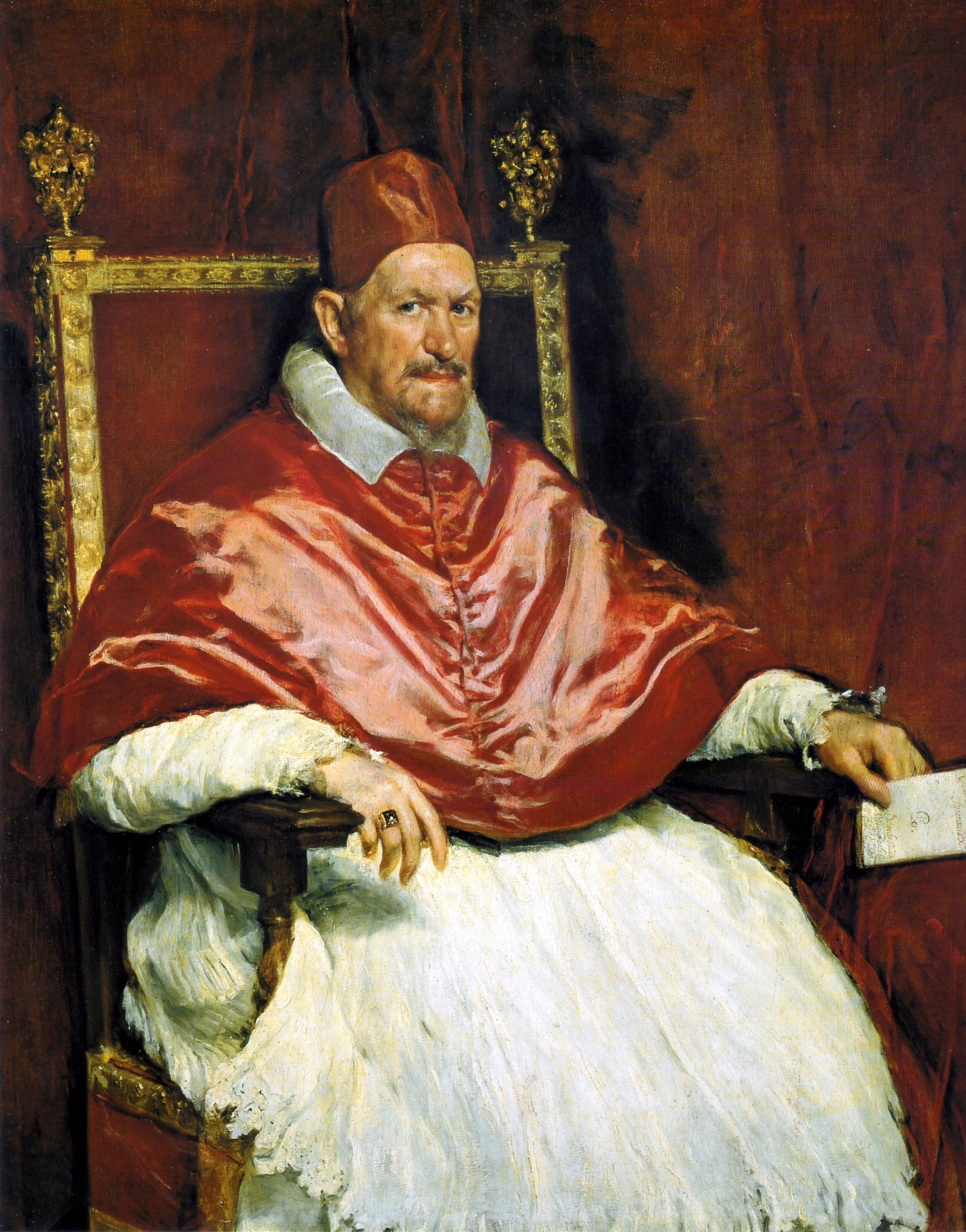
Pope Innocent X

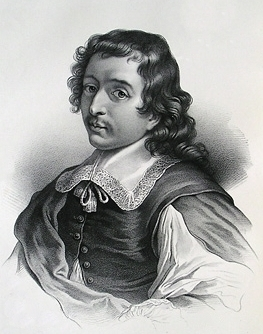
Eustache Le Sueur

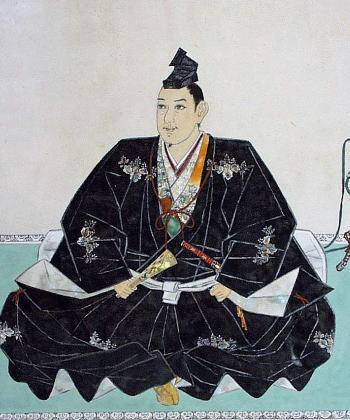
Ukita Hideie

- January 6 – Louis Philip, Count Palatine of Simmern-Kaiserslautern, Prince of Paltinate (b. 1602)
- January 7 – Pope Innocent X (b. 1574)
- February 15 – Pier Luigi Carafa, Italian Catholic cardinal (b. 1581)
- February 21 – John X of Schleswig-Holstein-Gottorp, Prince-Bishop of Lübeck (1634–1655) (b. 1606)
- February 25 – Daniel Heinsius, Flemish scholar (b. 1580)
- February 27 – Francesco Molin, Doge of Venice (b. 1575)
- March 28 – Maria Eleonora of Brandenburg, German princess and queen consort of Sweden (b. 1599)
- March 30 – James Stewart, 1st Duke of Richmond (b. 1612)
- April 6 – David Blondel, French Protestant clergyman (b. 1591)
- April 14 – Johann Erasmus Kindermann, German composer and organist (b. 1616)
- April 29 – Cornelis Schut, Flemish painter, draughtsman and engraver (b. 1597)
- April 30 – Eustache Le Sueur, French painter (b. 1617)
- May 5 – Richard Harrison, English politician (b. 1583)
- May 8 – Edward Winslow, American Pilgrim leader (b. 1596)
- May 30 – Christian, Margrave of Brandenburg-Bayreuth (b. 1581)
- June 26 – Margaret of Savoy, Vicereine of Portugal (b. 1589)
- June 27 – Eleonora Gonzaga, Holy Roman Empress, married to Ferdinand II, Holy Roman Emperor (b. 1598)
- June 30 – Jacobus Boonen, Dutch Catholic archbishop (b. 1573)
- July 15 – Girolamo Rainaldi, Italian architect (b. 1570)
- July 28
  - Cyrano de Bergerac, French soldier and writer (b. 1619)
  - Suzuki Shōsan, Japanese samurai (b. 1579)
- July 30 – Sigmund Theophil Staden, important early German composer (b. 1607)
- August 10 – Alfonso de la Cueva, 1st Marquis of Bedmar, Spanish cardinal and diplomat (b. 1572)
- September 7 – François Tristan l'Hermite, French dramatist (b. 1601)
- September 24 – Frederick, Landgrave of Hesse-Eschwege (b. 1617)
- October 13 – Tobie Matthew, English Member of Parliament (b. 1577)
- October 14 – Arnold Möller, German calligrapher (b. 1581)
- October 16 – Joseph Solomon Delmedigo, Italian physician, mathematician and music theorist (b. 1591)
- October 18 – Joachim Lütkemann, German theologian (b. 1608)
- October 24 – Pierre Gassendi, French philosopher, mathematician, and scientist (b. 1592)
- November 3 – Paulus Aertsz van Ravesteyn, Dutch printer (born c. 1586)
- November 6 – Maximilian, Prince of Dietrichstein, German prince (b. 1596)
- November 16 – Giuseppe Marcinò, Italian priest, member of the Order of Friars Minor (b. 1589)
- November 23 – Elizabeth Wriothesley, Countess of Southampton (b. 1572)
- November 28 – John Oglander, English politicians (b. 1585)
- December 17 – Ukita Hideie, Japanese daimyō (b. 1573)
- December 20 – Gregers Krabbe, Danish noble (b. 1594)
- December 22 – Tsugaru Nobuyoshi, Japanese daimyō (b. 1619)
- December 31 – Sir John Wray, 2nd Baronet, English politician (b. 1586)
- date unknown – Kocc Barma Fall, Senegambian philosopher (b. 1586)

1656

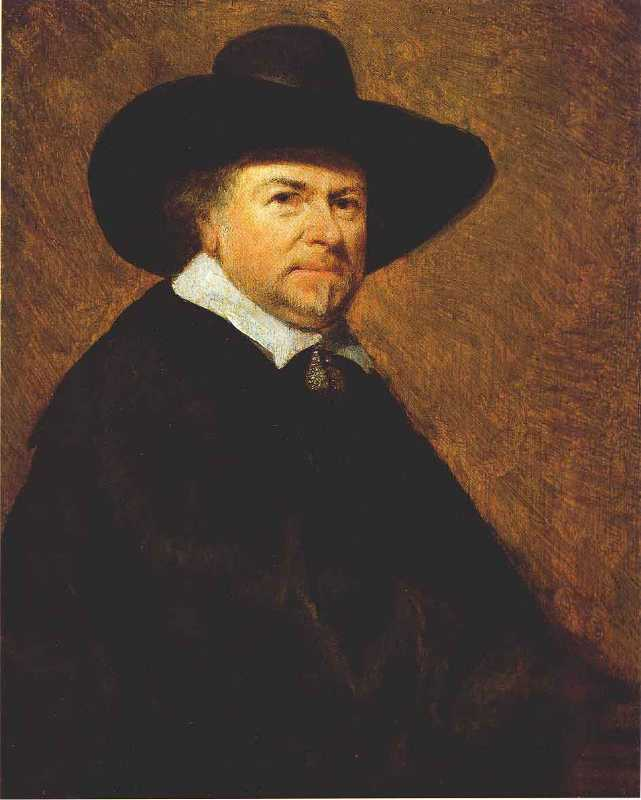
Jan van Goyen

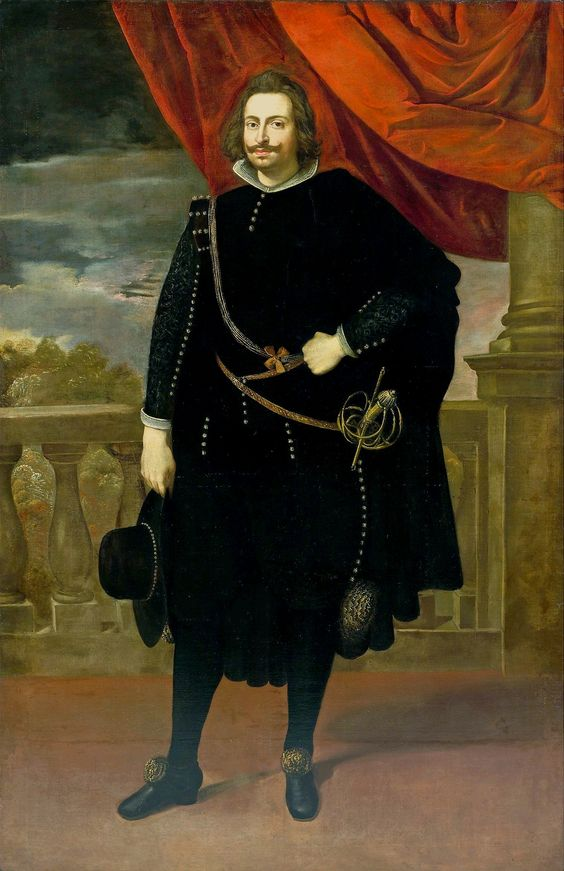
John IV of Portugal

- January 3 – Mathieu Molé, French statesman (b. 1584)
- January 18 – Augustus, Duke of Saxe-Lauenburg, German noble (b. 1577)
- January 22 – Thomas Francis, Prince of Carignano (b. 1596)
- February 13 – Ferdinando Hastings, 6th Earl of Huntingdon, English politician (b. 1609)
- February 25 – Henriette Catherine de Joyeuse, Duke of Joyeuse (b. 1585)
- February 27 – Meleki Hatun, influential Ottoman lady-in-waiting (killed by rebels)
- March 21 – James Ussher, Archbishop of Armagh and Primate of All Ireland (b. 1581)
- March 19 – Georg Calixtus, German Lutheran theologian who looked to reconcile all Christendom (b. 1586)
- April 7 – Krzysztof Arciszewski, Polish-Lithuanian noble (b. 1592)
- April 10 – Gerard Pietersz Hulft, Dutch general (b. 1621)
- April 24 – Thomas Fincke, Danish mathematician and physicist (b. 1561)
- April 27
  - Jan van Goyen, Dutch painter (b. 1596)
  - Gerard van Honthorst, Dutch painter (b. 1592)
- May 1 – Carlo Contarini, Doge of Venice (b. 1580)
- May 17 – Dirck Hals, Dutch painter (b. 1591)
- May 19 – George Louis, Prince of Nassau-Dillenburg, German noble (b. 1618)
- June 5 – Francesco Cornaro, Doge of Venice (b. 1585)
- June 9 – Thomas Tomkins, Welsh-born composer (b. 1572)
- June 12 – Charles Worsley, English soldier and politician (b. 1622)
- June 21 – Maximilian van der Sandt, Dutch theologian (b. 1578)
- July 2 – François-Marie, comte de Broglie, Italian-born French commander (b. 1611)
- July 12 – Giovanni Giacomo Barbelli, Italian painter (b. 1604)
- August 8 – Brás Garcia de Mascarenhas, Portuguese soldier, poet and writer (b. 1596)
- August 11 – Ottavio Piccolomini, Austrian-Italian field marshal (b. 1599)
- August 17 – Marie Anne d'Orléans, French princess (b. 1652)
- August 24 – Aegidius Gelenius, German heraldist (b. 1595)
- September 8 – Joseph Hall, English bishop and writer (b. 1574)
- September 22 – Christian II, Prince of Anhalt-Bernburg since 1630 (b. 1599)
- October – Stephen Bachiler, English clergyman (b. c. 1561)
- October 3 – Myles Standish, Mayflower colonist (b. c. 1584)
- October 8 – John George I, Elector of Saxony (b. 1585)
- October 12
  - Juan Alonso y Ocón, Spanish Catholic prelate, Archbishop of La Plata o Charcas (b. 1597)
  - Juan Tellez-Girón y Enriquez de Ribera, 4th Duke of Osuna (b. 1597)
- October 30 – Ferruccio Baffa Trasci, Italian bishop (b. 1590)
- November 6
  - King John IV of Portugal (b. 1604)
  - Jean-Baptiste Morin, French mathematician (b. 1583)
- November 12
  - Albrycht Stanisław Radziwiłł, Polish nobleman (b. 1595)
  - Hendrick van Anthonissen, Dutch painter (b. 1605)
- December 2 – Alessandro dal Borro, Austrian field marshal (b. 1600)
- December 20 – David Beck, Dutch portrait painter (b. 1621)
- December 21 – Thomas Trevor, English politician and judge (b. 1586)
- December 27 – Andrew White, Apostle of Maryland (b. 1579)
- December 28 – Laurent de La Hyre, French Baroque painter (b. 1606)
- Date unknown – Andrea Calcese, Italian Baroque era comic actor (plague) (b. 1595)

1657

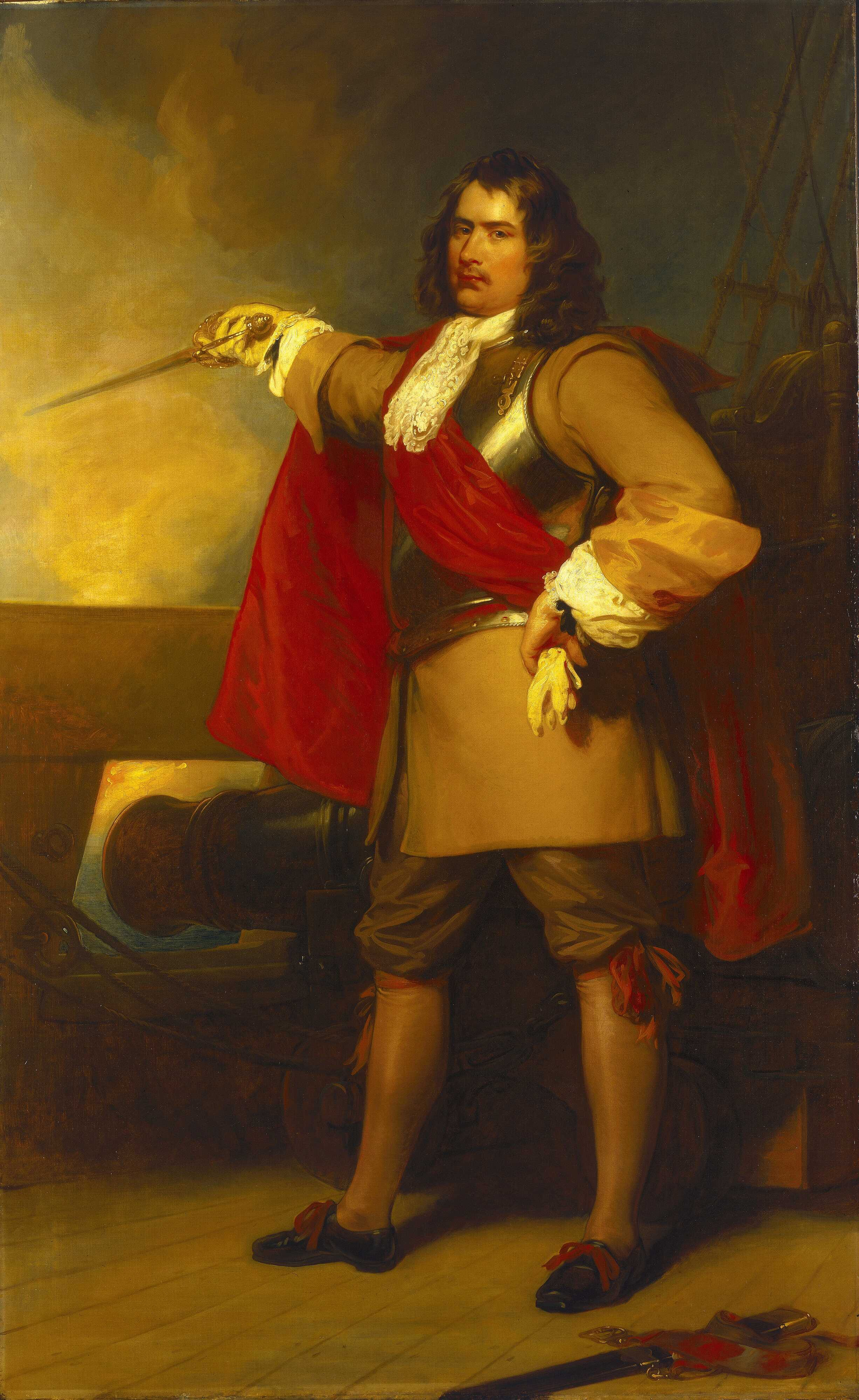
Robert Blake

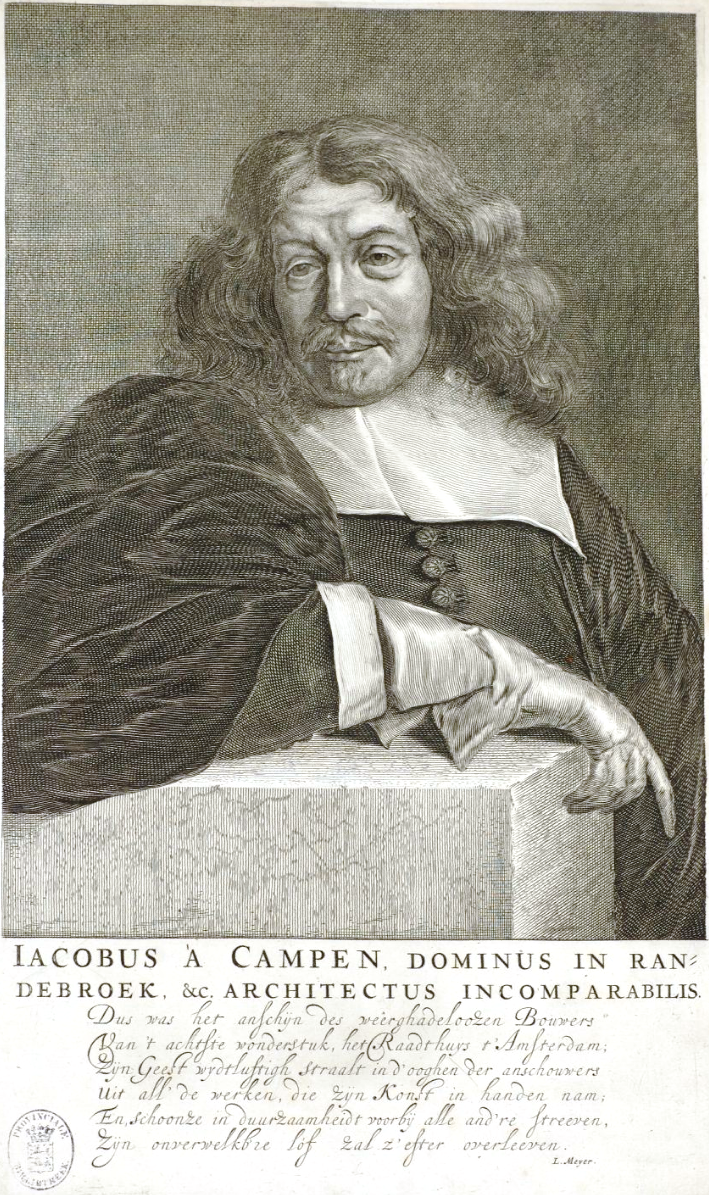
Jacob van Campen

- January 24 – Claude, Duke of Chevreuse (b. 1578)
- February 2 – Nicole, Duchess of Lorraine, French noble (b. 1608)
- February 7 – Cesare Dandini, Italian painter (b. 1596)
- February 8 – Laura Mancini, French court beauty (b. 1636)
- February 10 – Sebastian Stoskopff, French painter (b. 1597)
- February 19 – Jean Riolan the Younger, French anatomist (b. 1577)
- March – Edward Hopkins, colonial Connecticut politician (b. 1600)
- March 7 – Hayashi Razan, Japanese neo-Confucianist scholar (b. 1583)
- March 10 – Barthold Nihus, Roman Catholic priest (b. 1590)
- April ? – Richard Lovelace, English Cavalier poet (b. 1617)
- April 2
  - Ferdinand III, Holy Roman Emperor (b. 1608)
  - Jean-Jacques Olier, French Catholic priest (b. 1608)
- April 29 – Sophie Elisabeth Pentz, daughter of Christian IV of Denmark (b. 1619)
- May 7 – Nabeshima Katsushige, Japanese daimyō (b. 1580)
- May 9 – William Bradford, Governor of Plymouth Colony (b. 1590)
- May 10 – Gustav Horn, Count of Pori, Swedish soldier and politician (b. 1592)
- May 16 – Andrzej Bobola, Polish Jesuit missionary (b. 1591)
- June 3 – William Harvey, English physician (b. 1578)
- June 26 – Tobias Michael, German composer and cantor (b. 1592)
- July 17 – Eleonore Marie of Anhalt-Bernburg, Duchess consort of Mecklenburg-Güstrow (b. 1600)
- August 6 – Bohdan Khmelnytsky, Ukrainian Cossack Hetman (b. c. 1595)
- August 14 – Giovanni Paolo Lascaris, Italian 57th Grandmaster of the Knights Hospitaller (b. 1560)
- August 19 – Frans Snyders, Flemish painter (b. 1579)
- August 7 – Robert Blake, British admiral (b. 1599)
- August 29 – John Lilburne, English dissenter (b. c. 1614)
- September 1 – Arnold Vinnius, Dutch lawyer (b. 1588)
- September 7 – Arvid Wittenberg, Swedish field marshal and statesman (b. 1606)
- September 13 – Jacob van Campen, Dutch artist (b. 1596)
- September 23 – Joachim Jungius, German mathematician and philosopher (b. 1587)
- September 27 – Olimpia Maidalchini, politically active Roman noble (b. 1591)
- October 4 – Prince Maurice of Savoy, Catholic cardinal and Prince of Savoy (b. 1593)
- October 23 – Domenico Massenzio, Italian baroque composer (b. 1586)
- November 5 – Charles II, Duke of Elbeuf, French noble (b. 1596)
- November 10 – Anders Bille, Danish general (b. 1600)
- November 18 – Luke Wadding, Irish Franciscan friar and historian (b. 1588)
- November 20 – Sir Hugh Cholmeley, 1st Baronet, English politician (b. 1600)
- December 5 – Johan Oxenstierna, Swedish count and statesman (b. 1611)
- December 24 – Philippe Le Sueur de Petiville, French poet (b. 1607)
- date unknown – Willem Bontekoe, Dutch sea captain (b. 1587)

1658

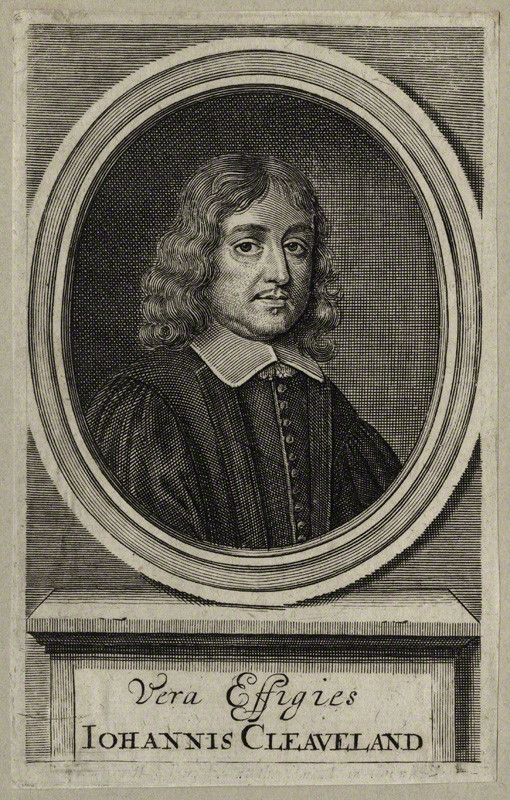
John Cleveland

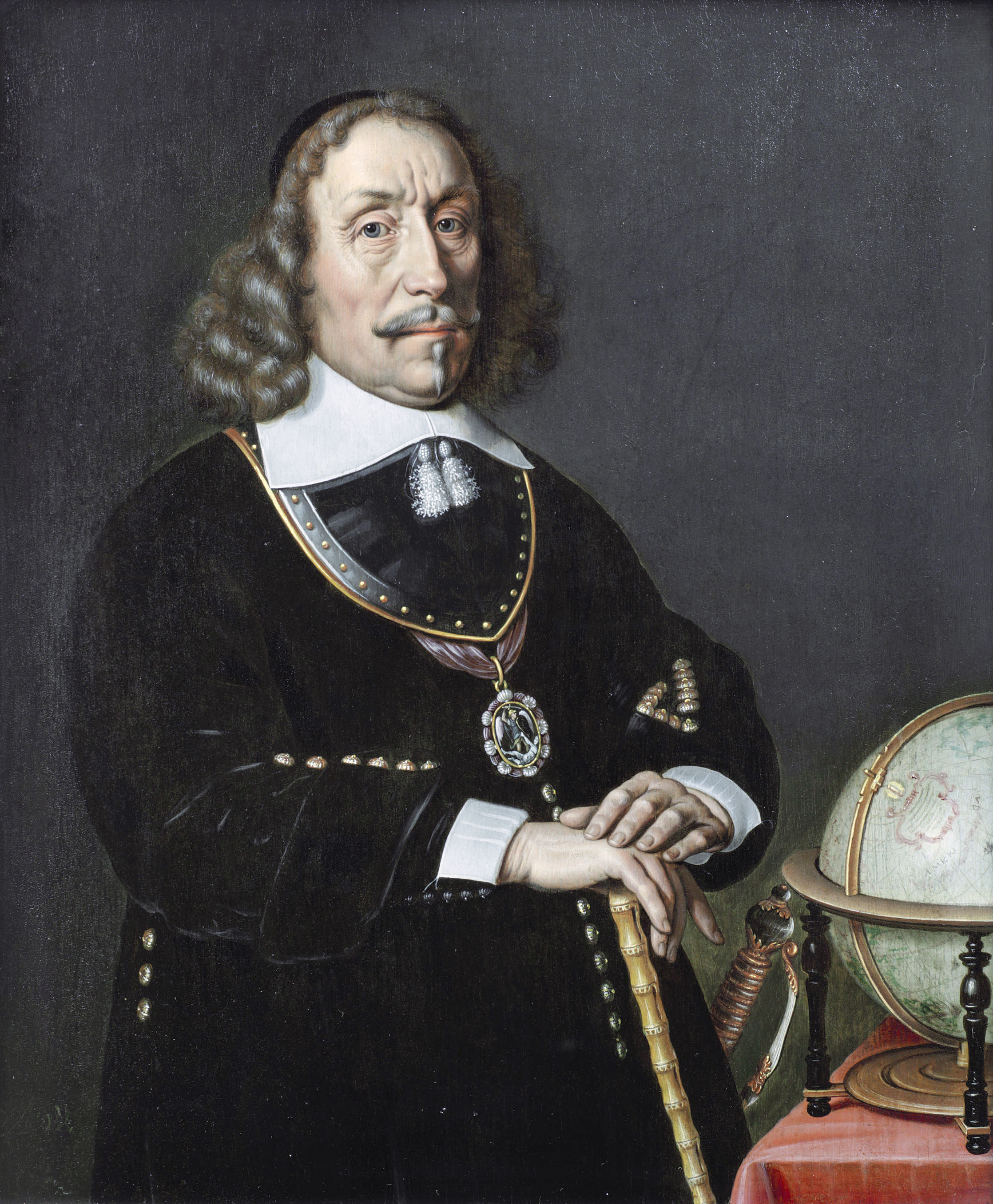
Witte Corneliszoon de With

- January 1 – Caspar Sibelius, Dutch Protestant minister (b. 1590)
- January 2 – Sir William Armine, 2nd Baronet, English politician (b. 1622)
- January 7 – Theophilus Eaton, English-born Connecticut colonist (b. 1590)
- January 13 – Edward Sexby, English Puritan soldier (b. 1616)
- February 19 – Henry Wilmot, 1st Earl of Rochester (b. 1612)
- March 25 – Herman IV, Landgrave of Hesse-Rotenburg (b. 1607)
- February 27 – Adolf Frederick I, Duke of Mecklenburg-Schwerin (1592–1628 and again 1631–1658) (b. 1588)
- March 29 – Bertuccio Valiero, Doge of Venice (b. 1596)
- April 7 – Juan Eusebio Nieremberg, Spanish mystic (b. 1595)
- April 19
  - Kirsten Munk, second wife of Christian IV of Denmark (b. 1598)
  - Robert Rich, 2nd Earl of Warwick, English colonial administrator and admiral (b. 1587)
- April 24 – Francesco Maria Richini, Italian architect (b. 1584)
- April 29 – John Cleveland, English poet (b. 1613)
- May 20 – Bartholomew Holzhauser, German priest, visionary and writer of prophecies (b. 1613)
- June 18 – Louis Cappel, French Protestant churchman and scholar (b. 1585)
- June 8 – Sir Henry Slingsby, 1st Baronet, English baronet (b. 1602)
- June 27 – Ercole Gennari, Italian drawer and painter (b. 1597)
- July 22 – Frederick, Duke of Schleswig-Holstein-Sønderburg-Norburg (b. 1581)
- August 5 – Gundakar, Prince of Liechtenstein, court official in Vienna (b. 1580)
- August 6 – Elizabeth Claypole, daughter of Oliver Cromwell (b. 1629)
- August 19 – Christine of Hesse-Kassel, Duchess of Saxe-Eisenach and Saxe-Coburg (b. 1578)
- September 3 – Oliver Cromwell, Lord Protector of England, Scotland, and Ireland (b. 1599)
- September 17 – Kaspar von Barth, German philologist and writer (b. 1587)
- September 22 – Georg Philipp Harsdörffer, German poet (b. 1607)
- October 14 – Francesco I d'Este, Duke of Modena, Italian noble (b. 1610)
- October 23 – Thomas Pride, Parliamentarian general in the English Civil War
- November 4 – Antoine Le Maistre, French Jansenist (b. 1608)
- November 6 – Pierre du Ryer, French dramatist (b. 1606)
- November 7 – Maeda Toshitsune, Japanese warlord (b. 1594)
- November 8 – Witte de With, Dutch naval officer (b. 1599)
- November 26 – Duke Francis Henry of Saxe-Lauenburg (b. 1604)
- November 29 – Margrave Charles Magnus of Baden-Durlach (b. 1621)
- December 6 – Baltasar Gracián y Morales, Spanish writer (b. 1601)
- December 15 – Carlo Emanuele Madruzzo, Italian prince-bishop (b. 1599)
- December 20 – Jean Jannon, French typefounder (b. 1580)
- Date unknown: Osoet Pegua, Thai businesswoman (b. 1615)

1659

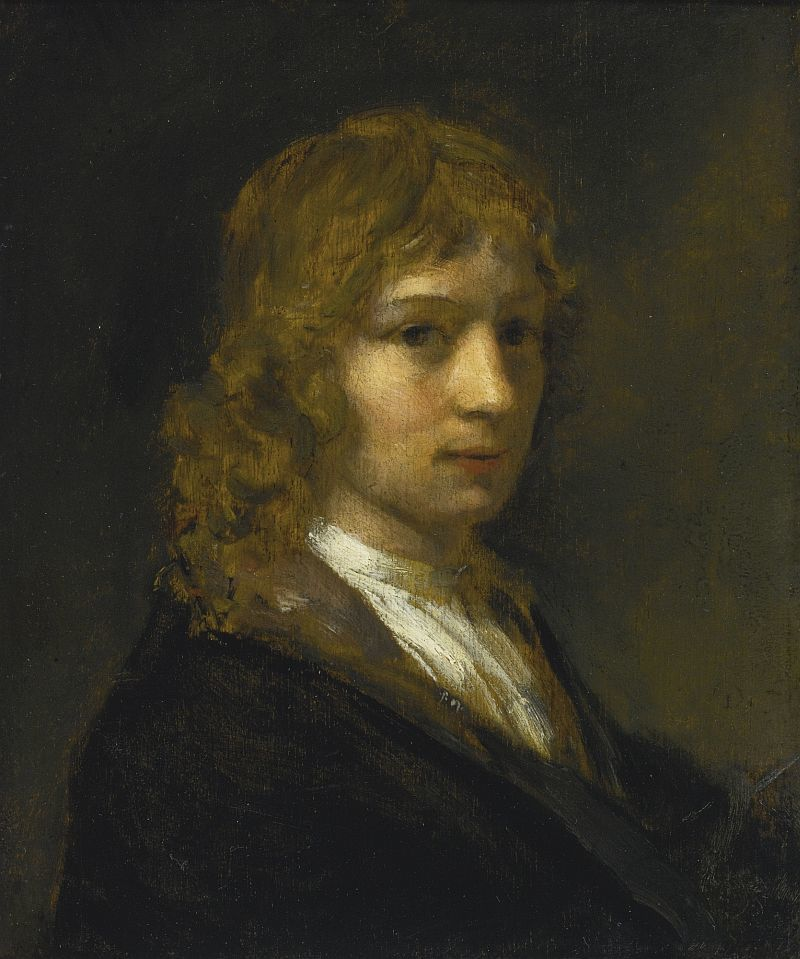
Willem Drost

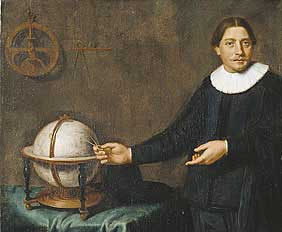
Abel Tasman

- January 2 – Richard Pepys, English politician (b. 1589)
- January 15 – Juliana of Hesse-Darmstadt, Countess of East Frisia (b. 1606)
- January 16 – Charles Annibal Fabrot, French lawyer (b. 1580)
- February – Willem Drost, Dutch painter and printmaker (b. 1633)
- February 4 – Francis Osborne, English writer (b. 1593)
- February 11 – Guillaume Colletet, French writer (b. 1598)
- February 12 – Duchess Magdalene Sibylle of Prussia, Electress of Saxony (b. 1586)
- February 15 – John Arrowsmith, English theologian and academic (b. 1602)
- February 17 – Abel Servien, French diplomat (b. 1593)
- February 27 – Henry Dunster, first president of Harvard College (b. 1609)
- March 9 – Peter Bulkley, English and later American Puritan (b. 1583)
- March 29 – Juan Bautista de Lezana, Spanish theologian (b. 1586)
- April 15 – Simon Dach, German poet (b. 1605)
- May 6 – Anne Eleonore of Hesse-Darmstadt, Duchess of Brunswick-Lüneburg by marriage (b. 1601)
- May 20 – Étienne de Courcelles, French scholar (b. 1586)
- May 29 – Robert Rich, 3rd Earl of Warwick (b. 1611)
- June 3 – Morgan Llwyd, Welsh Puritan preacher and writer (b. 1619)
- June 6 – Nadira Banu Begum, Mughal princess (b. 1618)
- June 21 – Afonso Mendes, Patriarch of Ethiopia (b. 1579)
- June 23 – Hyojong of Joseon, 17th king of the Joseon dynasty of Korea (1649-1659) (b. 1619)
- July 5 – Gironima Spana, Italian poisoner and central figure of the Spana Prosecution (executed) (b. 1615)
- August 7 – Jonathan Brewster, American settler (b. 1593)
- August 10
  - Eleonora Ramirez di Montalvo, Italian educator (b. 1602)
  - Frederick III, Duke of Holstein-Gottorp (b. 1597)
- August 30
  - Alexander Lindsay, 1st Earl of Balcarres, Scottish politician and noble (b. 1618)
  - Dara Shikoh, Indian prince (b. 1615)
- September 8 – Frederick V, Margrave of Baden-Durlach (1622–1659) (b. 1594)
- September 27 – Andreas Tscherning, German poet (b. 1611)
- September 30 – Giovanni Pesaro, Doge of Venice (b. 1589)
- October 1 – Juan de Palafox y Mendoza, Spanish politician, clergyman (b. 1600)
- October 8
  - Jean de Quen, French Jesuit missionary and historian (b. c. 1603)
  - Robert Cholmondeley, 1st Earl of Leinster, English politician (b. 1584)
- October 10 – Abel Tasman, Dutch explorer (b. 1603)
- October 27 – Giovanni Francesco Busenello, Italian librettist (b. 1598)
- October 31 – John Bradshaw, English judge (b. 1602)
- November 6 – Jérôme le Royer de la Dauversière, French nobleman, founder of Montreal and an order of nursing Sisters (b. 1597)
- November 7 – Jens Bjelke, Norwegian noble (b. 1580)
- November 10 – Afzal Khan, Indian commander of the Bijapur Adilshahi forces
- December 5 – Fra Bonaventura Bisi, Italian painter (b. 1601)
- December 31
  - János Apáczai Csere, Hungarian mathematician (b. 1625)
  - Alain de Solminihac, French bishop and beatified person (b. 1593)
- date unknown – Anne Greene, English domestic servant and execution survivor (b. c. 1628)
