= 1659 =

1659 in various calendars
- Gregorian calendar: 1659; MDCLIX
- Ab urbe condita: 2412
- Armenian calendar: 1108; ԹՎ ՌՃԸ
- Assyrian calendar: 6409
- Balinese saka calendar: 1580–1581
- Bengali calendar: 1065–1066
- Berber calendar: 2609
- English Regnal year: 10 Cha. 2 – 11 Cha. 2 (Interregnum)
- Buddhist calendar: 2203
- Burmese calendar: 1021
- Byzantine calendar: 7167–7168
- Chinese calendar: 戊戌年 (Earth Dog); 4356 or 4149 — to — 己亥年 (Earth Pig); 4357 or 4150
- Coptic calendar: 1375–1376
- Discordian calendar: 2825
- Ethiopian calendar: 1651–1652
- Hebrew calendar: 5419–5420
- Hindu calendars
- Vikram Samvat: 1715–1716
- Shaka Samvat: 1580–1581
- Kali Yuga: 4759–4760
- Holocene calendar: 11659
- Igbo calendar: 659–660
- Iranian calendar: 1037–1038
- Islamic calendar: 1069–1070
- Japanese calendar: Manji 2 (万治２年)
- Javanese calendar: 1581–1582
- Julian calendar: Gregorian minus 10 days
- Korean calendar: 3992
- Minguo calendar: 253 before ROC 民前253年
- Nanakshahi calendar: 191
- Thai solar calendar: 2201–2202
- Tibetan calendar: ས་ཕོ་ཁྱི་ལོ་ (male Earth-Dog); 1785 or 1404 or 632 — to — ས་མོ་ཕག་ལོ་ (female Earth-Boar); 1786 or 1405 or 633

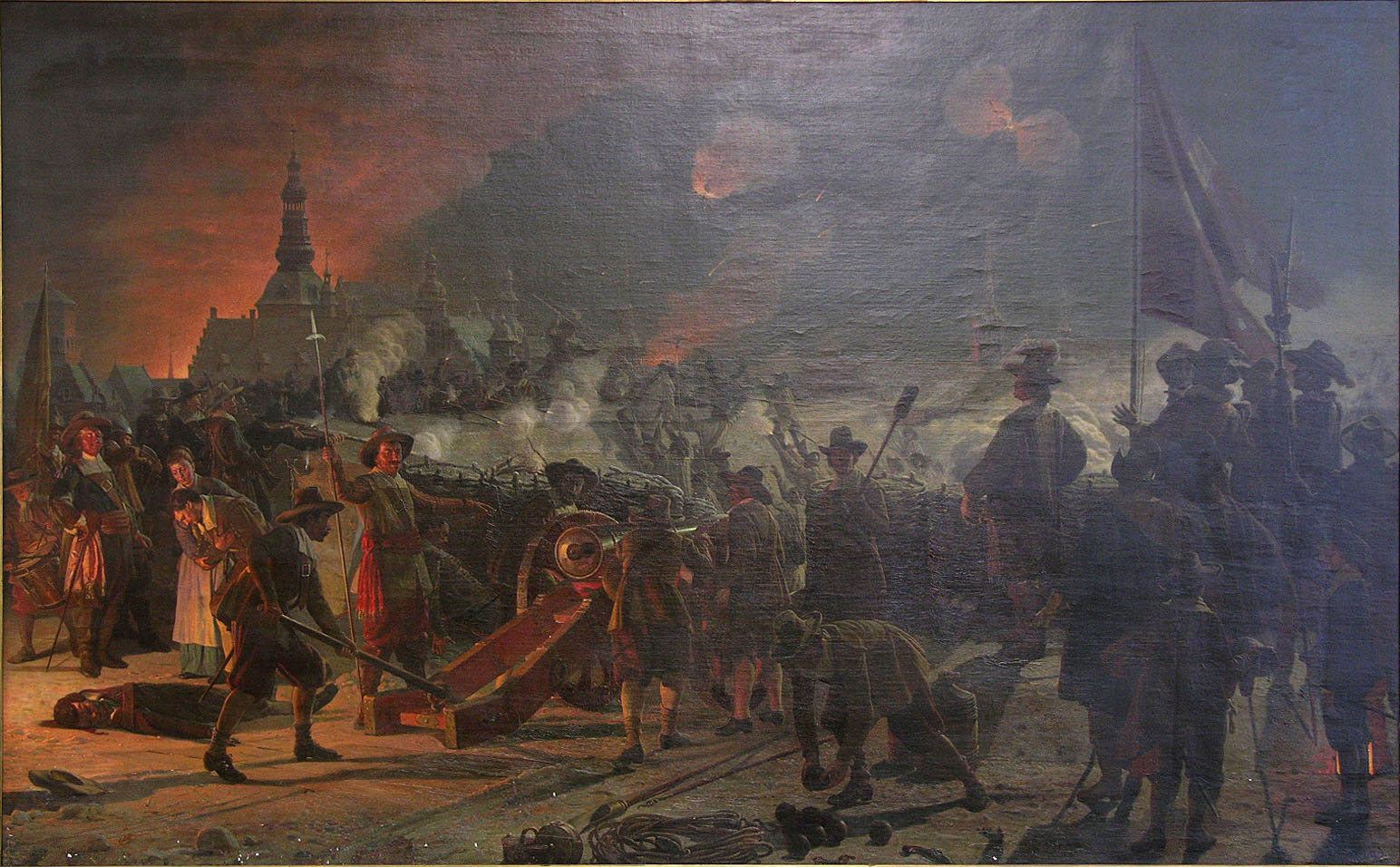
February 11: The Army of Denmark defeats the Assault on Copenhagen from an invasion by Sweden

1659 (MDCLIX) was a common year starting on Wednesday of the Gregorian calendar and a common year starting on Saturday of the Julian calendar, the 1659th year of the Common Era (CE) and Anno Domini (AD) designations, the 659th year of the 2nd millennium, the 59th year of the 17th century, and the 10th and last year of the 1650s decade. As of the start of 1659, the Gregorian calendar was 10 days ahead of the Julian calendar, which remained in localized use until 1923.

== Events ==
=== January–March ===
- January 14 – In the Battle of the Lines of Elvas, fought near the small city of Elvas in Portugal during the Portuguese Restoration War, the Spanish Army under the command of Luis Méndez de Haro suffers heavy casualties, with over 11,000 of its nearly 16,000 soldiers killed, wounded or taken prisoner; the smaller Portuguese force of 10,500 troops, commanded by André de Albuquerque Ribafria (who is killed in the battle) suffers less than 900 casualties.
- January 24 – Pierre Corneille's Oedipe premieres in Paris.
- January 27 – The third and final session of the Parliament of the Commonwealth of England, Scotland and Ireland is opened by Lord Protector Richard Cromwell, with Chaloner Chute as the Speaker of the House of Commons, with 567 members. "Cromwell's Other House", which replaces the House of Lords during the last years of the Protectorate, opens on the same day, with Richard Cromwell as its speaker.
- January 31 – Giovanna De Grandis is arrested in Rome and charged with trafficking the lethal Aqua Tofana poison. On February 2, she implicates the mastermind of the poisoners, Gironima Spana, starting the case of the Spana Prosecution that eventually leads to the arrest and trial of 40 people.
- February 2 – Jan van Riebeeck produces the first South African wine, at the Cape of Good Hope.
- February 11 – The Assault on Copenhagen by Swedish forces is beaten back, with heavy losses.
- February 16 – The first known cheque (400 pounds) is written.
- March 1 – In exile in the Netherlands while plotting the restoration of the monarchy to England, Scotland and Ireland, Charles, son of the late King Charles I appoints seven royalists (including six from the "Sealed Knot" group) to a "Great Trust and Commission" to make plans for a post-restoration government. The Great Trust is led by Charles's trusted advisor, Edward Hyde.
- March 9 – Sir Lislebone Long is elected as the Speaker of the House of Commons by the Third Protectorate Parliament after Chaloner Chute becomes seriously ill. Long serves only six days before dying on March 16. Chute remains Speaker but dies on April 14 and is replaced by Thomas Bampfield.
- March 11 – Prince Dara Shikoh, who had been the heir apparent to the throne of the Mughal Empire in India until the overthrow of his father, Shah Jahan, makes a stand near Ajmer to fight the armies sent by Mughal Emperor Aurangzeb, but loses and is forced to flee.
- March 28 – The Danish Africa Company (Dansk afrikanske kompagni) is chartered to Hendrik Carloff for the purpose of capturing Africa slaves from the area around Denmark's colony on the Danish Gold Coast for use in the West Indies.

=== April–June ===
- April 22 – Under pressure from the English Army in London, which has assembled troops outside of Westminster, Richard Cromwell, Lord Protector of England, Scotland and Ireland, dissolves the Third Protectorate Parliament, the last for the Commonwealth.
- May 6 – English Army General Hezekiah Haynes, joined by officers Charles Fleetwood, John Lambert, James Berry, Robert Lilburne, Thomas Kelsey, William Goffe and William Packer, presents the manifesto A Declaration of the Officers of the Army, advocating that Lord Protector Cromwell step down after restoring the "Rump Parliament" to administer England. Cromwell restores the parliament rule the next day and decides to step down.
- May 21 – The Kingdom of France, the Commonwealth of England and the Dutch Republic sign the Concert of The Hague, agreeing a common stance on the Second Northern War.
- May 25 – Richard Cromwell resigns as English Lord Protector, submitting "a letter that may have been dictated to him." In the letter, signed by Cromwell in front of Sir Gilbert Pickering and Lord Chief-Justice St. John, "I have perused the Resolve and Declaration, which you were pleased to deliver to me the other Night," and after listing his personal debts to be paid in return for stepping down, "As to that Part of the Resolve, whereby the Committee are to inform themselves, How far I do acquiesce in the Government of this Commonwealth, as it is declared by this Parliament; I trust, my past Carriage hitherto hath manifested my Acquiescence in the Will and Disposition of God; and that I love and value the Peace of this Commonwealth much above my own Concernments: And I desire, that by this, a Measure of my future Deportment may be taken; which, thro' the Assistance of God, shall be such as shall bear the same Witness; having, I hope, in some degree, learned rather to reverence and submit to the Hand of God, than to be unquiet under it: And, as to the late Providences that have fallen out amongst us, however, in respect of the particular Engagements that lay upon me, I could not be active in making a Change in the Government of these Nations, yet through the Goodness of God, I can freely acquiesce in it, being made; and do hold myself obliged." The executive government is replaced by the restored Council of State, dominated by Generals John Lambert, Charles Fleetwood and John Desborough. The Council of State is dismissed by the Rump Parliament on October 13 and replaced by the "Committee of Safety" on October 25.
- June 10 – Dara Shikoh, at one time the heir apparent for the Mughal Empire, is betrayed by an Afghan chieftain, Junaid Khan Barozai, who had initially given him refuge from pursuit from the new emperor, Aurangzeb. Turned over to Aurangzeb's men, Dara Shikoh is killed on August 30.
- June 29 – In the Battle of Konotop, fought near the Ukrainian city of Konotop during the Russo-Polish War, Polish Cossack hetman Ivan Vyhovsky and his allies defeat the armies of the Tsardom of Russia, led by Aleksey Trubetskoy.

=== July–September ===
- July 5 – Five women are executed by hanging at Rome after being convicted of murder in the Spana Prosecution by distributing the powerful Aqua Tofana poison, sold primarily to women wishing to get rid of their husbands. Put to death on the same day are Gironima Spana, Giovanna De Grandis, Maria Spinola, Graziosa Farina and Laura Crispoldi, in the public square at the Campo de' Fiori.
- July 16 – Princess Henriette Catherine of Nassau marries John George II, Prince of Anhalt-Dessau, in Groningen.
- July 31 – Dodda Kempadevaraja (Devaraja Wodeyar I) becomes the new maharaja of the Kingdom of Mysore (part of modern-day India's Karnataka state) upon the death of his cousin, Kanthirava Narasaraja I. He is crowned on August 19.
- July – Christiaan Huygens's important work on astronomy, Systema Saturnium, is published.
- August 3 – Booth's Uprising, led by George Booth, begins in the city of Chester as 3,000 royalists attempt a revolt against the military government of England. English Army troops begin marching on August 5 to suppress the rebellion.
- August 7 – As Booth's Uprising spreads to Liverpool, Thomas Myddelton, Randolph Egerton and fellow royalists take control of the town of Wrexham in Wales and proclaim Charles II to be King.
- August 15 – Two English warships block the entrance to the River Dee to prevent supplies from reaching Booth's rebels in Chester, while Major General John Lambert of the English Army advances into Cheshire at Nantwich.
- August 19 – At the Battle of Winnington Bridge, the Protectorate Army of 5,000 troops, dispatched by Parliament and under the command of Major General Lambert, routs the 4,000 anti-government rebels commanded by George Booth of England and Edward Broughton of Wales. Lambert and his forces, exhausted from their rapid march and the battle, elect not to pursue the fleeing rebels and less than 30 rebels are killed.
- August 27 – Portuguese Jesuits led by António Vieira sign the Treaty of the Mapuá with various indigenous peoples on the Marajó Archipelago at the mouth of the Amazon River.
- August 30 – Poland's army of over 12,000 troops under the command of Jerzy Sebastian Lubomirski and Krzysztof Grodzicki, takes back the city of Grudziądz, which has been under Sweden's control since the end of 1655, after a siege of seven days. Much of the town is left in ruins after a fire and bombardment from Polish cannons.
- September 20 – War between Dutch settlers and the native Lenape Indians, of the Esopus tribe, in modern-day Ulster County, New York, in the U.S., as a group of Dutch settlers from the village of Wiltwijck, New Netherland fires their guns at a group of Esopus men who have been sitting around a campfire. For the next ten months, the Esopus warriors, commanded by Chief Papequanaehen, fight a war with the Dutch that is finally settled with a peace treaty on July 15, 1660.
- September 22 – The Ottoman-ruled island of Kizilhisar (called Castelrosso by Italy and in modern times the island of Kastellorizo in Greece) is captured from the Ottoman Empire by the navy of the Republic of Venice after nearly 150 years of Ottoman rule that had started in 1512.
- September 30 – Peter Stuyvesant of New Netherland forbids tennis playing during religious services, marking the first mention of tennis in what will become the United States.

=== October–December ===
- October 12 – The English Rump Parliament dismisses John Lambert, and other generals.
- October 13 – General-major John Lambert drives out the English Rump-government.
- November 7 – The Treaty of the Pyrenees is signed by representatives of Kings Louis XIV of France and Philip IV of Spain. Spain agrees to French acquisition of the counties of Roussillon and Upper Cerdanya (Principality of Catalonia) and most of Artois, formally ending the 24-year-long Franco-Spanish War.
- November 25 – Dutch forces under Michiel de Ruyter free the Danish city of Nyborg from Swedish conquest that had taken place earlier in the year.
- December 16 – General George Monck demands free parliamentary elections in Scotland and resolves to overthrow the military government that has ruled the British Isles since 1648.
- December 26 – The Long Parliament reforms occur in Westminster.

=== Date unknown ===
- First British colonists arrive on Saint Helena.
- Spanish Infanta Maria Theresa brings cocoa to Paris.
- Diego Velázquez's portrait of Infanta Maria Theresa is first exhibited.
- Thomas Hobbes publishes De Homine.
- Parisian police raid a monastery, sending monks to prison for eating meat and drinking wine during Lent.
- Drought occurs in India.
- Peter Swink, the first known non-white settler to own land in Massachusetts, and first known African to live in Springfield, Massachusetts, arrives. He holds a seat in the town meetings.

== Births ==
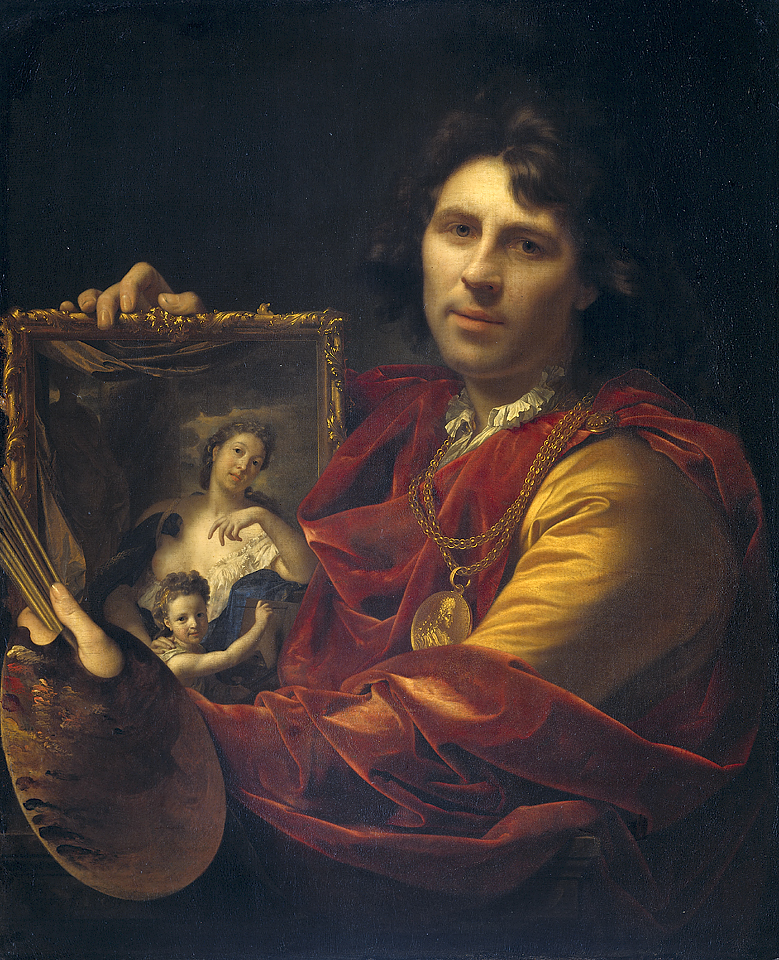
Adriaen van der Werff

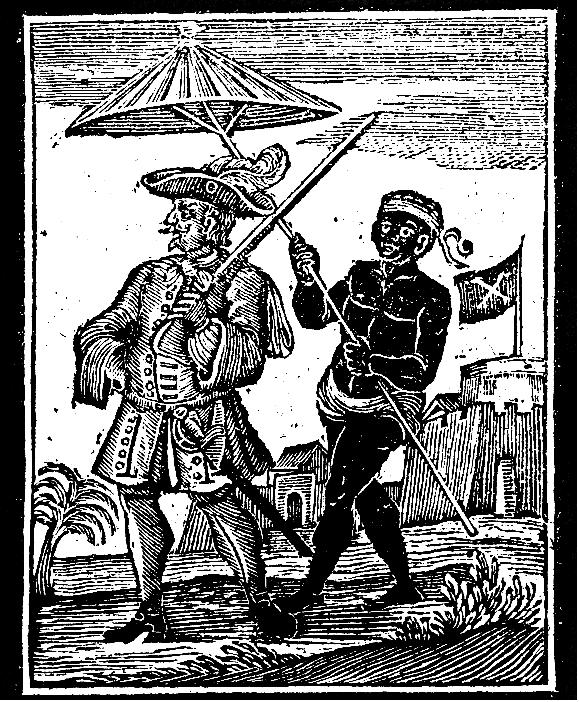
Henry Every

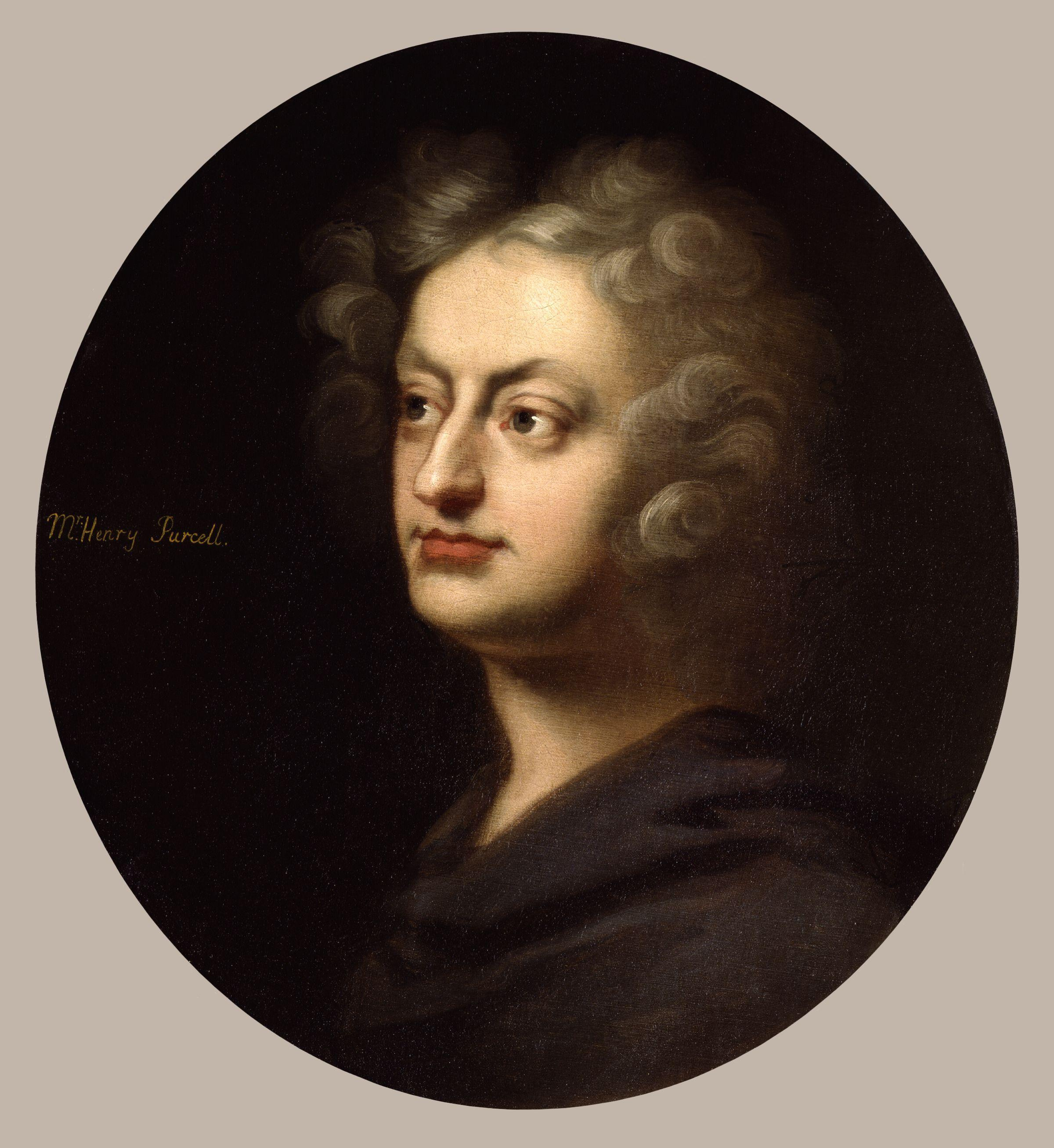
Henry Purcell

- January 1 – Margaret Wemyss, 3rd Countess of Wemyss, Scottish noble (d. 1705)
- January 4 – James Pierpont, Connecticut Congregationalist minister, a founder of Yale University (d. 1714)
- January 11 – Ambrose Browne, English politician (d. 1688)
- January 13 – Johann Arnold Nering, German architect (d. 1695)
- January 17
  - Takatsukasa Kanehiro, Japanese court noble of the Edo period (d. 1725)
  - Antonio Veracini, Italian composer (d. 1745)
- January 18 – Damaris Cudworth Masham, English philosopher (d. 1708)
- January 21 – Adriaen van der Werff, Dutch painter (d. 1722)
- January 28 – Sir Samuel Barnardiston, 2nd Baronet, English politician (d. 1709)
- February 1 – Jacob Roggeveen, Dutch Pacific Ocean explorer (d. 1729)
- February 14 – Theodore Eustace, Count Palatine of Sulzbach (d. 1732)
- February 27 – William Sherard, English botanist (d. 1728)
- March 4 – Pierre Lepautre (1659–1744), French sculptor (d. 1744)
- March 6 – Salomon Franck, German lawyer, scientist and poet (d. 1725)
- March 8 – Isaac de Beausobre, French Protestant pastor (d. 1738)
- March 25 – John Asgill, Irish politician (d. 1738)
- March 26 – William Wollaston, English philosopher (d. 1724)
- April 8 – Christopher Tancred, English politician (d. 1705)
- April 14
  - Albrecht of Saxe-Weissenfels, German prince (d. 1692)
  - William Delaune, English academic administrator and clergyman (d. 1728)
- April 15 – Adam Ludwig Lewenhaupt, Swedish general (d. 1719)
- April 16 – Jacques le Moyne de Sainte-Hélène, Canadian soldier (d. 1690)
- April 29
  - Sophia Elisabet Brenner, Swedish writer (d. 1730)
  - Date Tsunamura, Japanese daimyō at the center of the Date Sōdō (d. 1719)
- May 4 – John Dunton, English bookseller and author (d. 1733)
- June 3 – David Gregory, Scottish mathematician and astronomer (d. 1708)
- June 5 – Wolfgang George Frederick von Pfalz-Neuburg, German bishop (d. 1683)
- June 7 – Henry Thompson (1659–1700), English politician and landowner (d. 1700)
- June 11 – Yamamoto Tsunetomo, Japanese samurai (d. 1719)
- June 15 – Claude de Ramezay, Canadian politician (d. 1724)
- June 22 – Simon-Pierre Denys de Bonaventure, French officer and governor of Acadia (d. 1711)
- June 26 – Sir John Brownlow, 3rd Baronet, English politician (d. 1697)
- July 3 – Franz Beer, Austrian architect (d. 1726)
- July 6 – Albert Wolfgang, Count of Hohenlohe-Langenburg (d. 1715)
- July 8 – Justus van Huysum, Dutch painter (d. 1716)
- July 14 – John Hutton (1659–1731), English politician (d. 1731)
- July 16 – Anne Wharton, English poet (d. 1685)
- July 18 – Hyacinthe Rigaud, French painter (d. 1743)
- July 22 – Noadiah Russell, American colonial clergyman, a founder of Yale University (d. 1713)
- July 28
  - Asano Tsunanaga, Japanese daimyō, ruler of the Hiroshima Domain (d. 1708)
  - Charles Ancillon, French Protestant pastor (d. 1715)
- August 1 – Sebastiano Ricci, Italian painter (d. 1734)
- August 2 – Andrew Archer, English politician (d. 1741)
- August 17 – Robert Challe, French colonialist (d. 1721)
- August 20 – Henry Every, English pirate (d. after 1696)
- September 1 – Domenico Egidio Rossi, Italian architect (d. 1715)
- September 5 – Michel Sarrazin, Canadian scientist (d. 1734)
- September 10 – Henry Purcell, English composer (d. 1695)
- September 12
  - Dirk Maas, Dutch painter (d. 1717)
  - Ferdinand Willem, Duke of Württemberg-Neuenstadt, Dutch general and noble (d. 1701)
- September 13 – Claud Hamilton, 4th Earl of Abercorn, Scottish and Irish peer (k. in action 1691)
- September 18 – Caleb Banks, English politician (d. 1696)
- October 13 – George Verney, 12th Baron Willoughby de Broke, English peer and clergyman (d. 1728)
- October 22 – Georg Ernst Stahl, German chemist (d. 1734)
- October 28 – Nicholas Brady (poet), English poet and Anglican clergyman (d. 1726)
- November 3 – Hui-bin Jang, Korean royal consort (d. 1701)
- November 10 – Albert Borgard, Danish artillery and engineer officer (d. 1751)
- November 19 – Jacques-Louis de Valon, French poet (d. 1719)
- December 2 – John Brereton, 4th Baron Brereton, Irish peer (d. 1718)
- December 12 – Francesco Galli Bibiena, Italian architect/designer (d. 1739)
- December 18 – Matthieu Petit-Didier, French Benedictine theologian (d. 1728)
- December 28 – François Catrou, French historian and Jesuit priest (d. 1737)

== Deaths ==
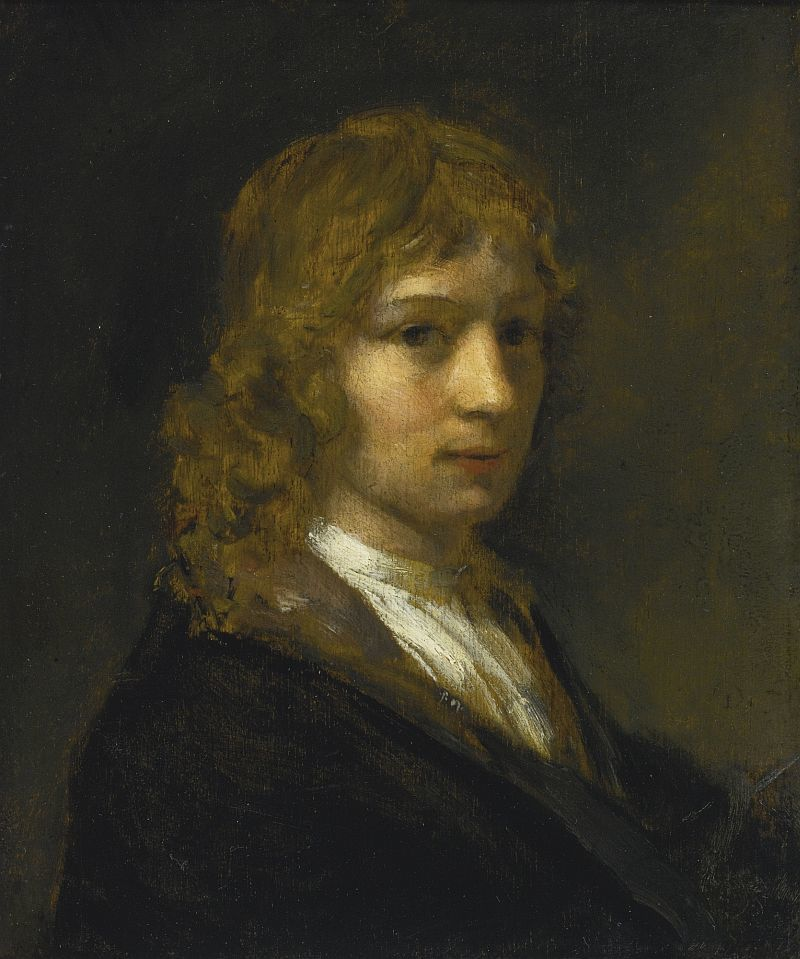
Willem Drost

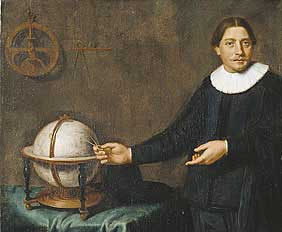
Abel Tasman

- January 2 – Richard Pepys, English politician (b. 1589)
- January 15 – Juliana of Hesse-Darmstadt, Countess of East Frisia (b. 1606)
- January 16 – Charles Annibal Fabrot, French lawyer (b. 1580)
- February – Willem Drost, Dutch painter and printmaker (b. 1633)
- February 4 – Francis Osborne, English writer (b. 1593)
- February 11 – Guillaume Colletet, French writer (b. 1598)
- February 12 – Duchess Magdalene Sibylle of Prussia, Electress of Saxony (b. 1586)
- February 15 – John Arrowsmith, English theologian and academic (b. 1602)
- February 17 – Abel Servien, French diplomat (b. 1593)
- February 27 – Henry Dunster, first president of Harvard College (b. 1609)
- March 9 – Peter Bulkley, English and later American Puritan (b. 1583)
- March 29 – Juan Bautista de Lezana, Spanish theologian (b. 1586)
- April 15 – Simon Dach, German poet (b. 1605)
- May 6 – Anne Eleonore of Hesse-Darmstadt, Duchess of Brunswick-Lüneburg by marriage (b. 1601)
- May 20 – Étienne de Courcelles, French scholar (b. 1586)
- May 29 – Robert Rich, 3rd Earl of Warwick (b. 1611)
- June 3 – Morgan Llwyd, Welsh Puritan preacher and writer (b. 1619)
- June 6 – Nadira Banu Begum, Mughal princess (b. 1618)
- June 21 – Afonso Mendes, Patriarch of Ethiopia (b. 1579)
- June 23 – Hyojong of Joseon, 17th king of the Joseon dynasty of Korea (1649-1659) (b. 1619)
- July 5 – Gironima Spana, Italian poisoner and central figure of the Spana Prosecution (executed) (b. 1615)
- August 7 – Jonathan Brewster, American settler (b. 1593)
- August 10
  - Eleonora Ramirez di Montalvo, Italian educator (b. 1602)
  - Frederick III, Duke of Holstein-Gottorp (b. 1597)
- August 30
  - Alexander Lindsay, 1st Earl of Balcarres, Scottish politician and noble (b. 1618)
  - Dara Shikoh, Indian prince (b. 1615)
- September 8 – Frederick V, Margrave of Baden-Durlach (1622–1659) (b. 1594)
- September 27 – Andreas Tscherning, German poet (b. 1611)
- September 30 – Giovanni Pesaro, Doge of Venice (b. 1589)
- October 1 – Juan de Palafox y Mendoza, Spanish politician, clergyman (b. 1600)
- October 8
  - Jean de Quen, French Jesuit missionary and historian (b. c. 1603)
  - Robert Cholmondeley, 1st Earl of Leinster, English politician (b. 1584)
- October 10 – Abel Tasman, Dutch explorer (b. 1603)
- October 27 – Giovanni Francesco Busenello, Italian librettist (b. 1598)
- October 31 – John Bradshaw, English judge (b. 1602)
- November 6 – Jérôme le Royer de la Dauversière, French nobleman, founder of Montreal and an order of nursing Sisters (b. 1597)
- November 7 – Jens Bjelke, Norwegian noble (b. 1580)
- November 10 – Afzal Khan, Indian commander of the Bijapur Adilshahi forces
- December 5 – Fra Bonaventura Bisi, Italian painter (b. 1601)
- December 31
  - János Apáczai Csere, Hungarian mathematician (b. 1625)
  - Alain de Solminihac, French bishop and beatified person (b. 1593)
- date unknown – Anne Greene, English domestic servant and execution survivor (b. c. 1628)
