= Anna Maria Conti =

Anna Maria Conti (born 1639) was an Italian painter's wife. She was one of the people implicated in the infamous Spana Prosecution.

== Life ==
Conti was the daughter of the rich merchant Emerick Conti (1611-1657). She married the failed French immigrant painter Simon Imbert (d. 1658). The marriage was described as an unhappy one: her spouse reportedly abused her and she suspected him of having poisoned her father. When she was widowed in 1658, she was rumoured to have poisoned her late spouse.

On 31 January 1659, Giovanna De Grandis was arrested in Rome and imprisoned in the Papal prison at Tor di Nona, which was the beginning of the infamous Spana Prosecution, exposing Gironima Spana's net work of poison dealers in Rome. In April, Conti was named by Maria Spinola, who stated that Conti had bought poison from Laura Crispoldi to murder her husband. Conti was not arrested. Being a member of the upper class, she was interviewed in her own residence. After having been granted immunity from the Pope, she confessed to have murdered her spouse because she believed he had murdered her father.

After having signed her statement, Conti was left out of further investigation. Instead, her maid Benedetta Merlini, who had introduced Conti to Crispoldi, was arrested and imprisoned in Tor di Nona, where she was interrogated under torture and testified against Crispoldi.
