= Cecilia Verzellina =

Italian poisoner

Cecilia Verzellina (died 6 March 1660, Rome) was an Italian poisoner. She was one of the central figures of the infamous Spana Prosecution. Of the over forty people implicated in the trial, she was one of six to be executed. While the other five executed women where poison sellers and poison makers, she was the only client to be executed.

== Life ==
On 31 January 1659, Giovanna De Grandis was arrested and imprisoned in the Papal prison at Tor di Nona, where she made her confession on 1 February, and started to name the names of her accomplices and clients.

De Grandis stated that Cecilia Verzellina had asked to buy poison from her with the explicit purpose to poison the dyer Giovanni Pietro Beltrammi, who was the husband of her daughter, Teresa Verzellina. Cecilia Verzellina had explained that her daughter lived in an unhappy marriage with a controlling mother-in-law and a jealous husband who abused her, and that she was worried that her daughter would be killed, because she had a lover, count Antonio Leonardi. De Grandis sold the poison to Cecilia Verzellina, and not long after, the son-in-law of Cecilia Verzellina died.

On 17 October, Cecilia Verzellina was arrested in Naples. She confessed her guilt on 20 October. She claimed that her daughter had not been aware of her act, and this was confirmed by her daughter Teresa Verzellina.

On 6 March 1660, Cecilia Verzellina was executed by hanging on Campo de' Fiori in Rome. Her daughter was whipped and banished from Rome.
