= Tofana =

Tofana may refer to:

- Tofana di Mezzo (3,244 m), Tofana di Dentro (3,238), and Tofana di Rozes (3,225 m), three of the highest peaks of the Tofane mountain group in Italy
- Giulia Tofana, an Italian high class courtier and professional poisoner at the court of Philip IV of Spain
- Aqua Tofana, a poison
