= Anna Maria Caterina Aldobrandini =

Italian Aristocrat

- Born: 1630
- Died: 1703 (aged 72–73)

Anna Maria Caterina Aldobrandini, Duchess of Cesi (1630–1703) was an Italian aristocrat. She was one of the people implicated in the infamous Spana Prosecution.

== Life ==
She was born to Pietro Aldobrandini, Duke of Carpineto, and Carlotta Savelli. In 1648, she married Francesco Maria Cesi, Duke of Cesi, in an arranged marriage. She belonged to the most prestigious noblefamilies in Rome both by birth and by marriage. She was described as a beauty, and "difficult to control, both because of the supremacy of her birth and no less because of the weakness of her sex". Her marriage was described as an unhappy one, and she reportedly had a relationship with Francesco Maria Santinelli (1627-1697). In June 1657, her spouse died unexpectedly. Her family had her locked up as a widow to prevent her from marrying her lover Francesco Maria Santinelli, since he was of lower rank and the marriage would be unequal and thus regarded as shameful to the family.

On 31 January 1659, Giovanna De Grandis was arrested in Rome and imprisoned in the Papal prison at Tor di Nona, which was the beginning of the infamous Spana Prosecution, exposing a network of poison dealers in Rome. When De Grandis started to name accomplices and clients, the name of Aldobrandini was mentioned. According to the testimony of De Grandis, Aldobrandini had acquired poison from her through the priest Don Girolamo with the intent of murdering her spouse, who had died not long after. When De Grandis had viewed the remains of the Duke on his lit de parade at the Santa Maria sopra Minerva, she recognized the symptoms of a corpse who had died due to the poison she had sold. The information was never investigated, since Pope Alexander VII gave the order that the Duchess of Cesi should be left out from the investigation.
