= SPANA (disambiguation) =

SPANA or Spana may refer to:

- Society for the Protection of Animals Abroad, an international charity for animals
- Spana Prosecution, a criminal case in the Papal States between 1659 and 1660
  - Gironima Spana (1615–1659), Italian poisoner, astrologer and central figure of the prosecution
