= Spana Prosecution =

Criminal case in Rome (1659–1660)

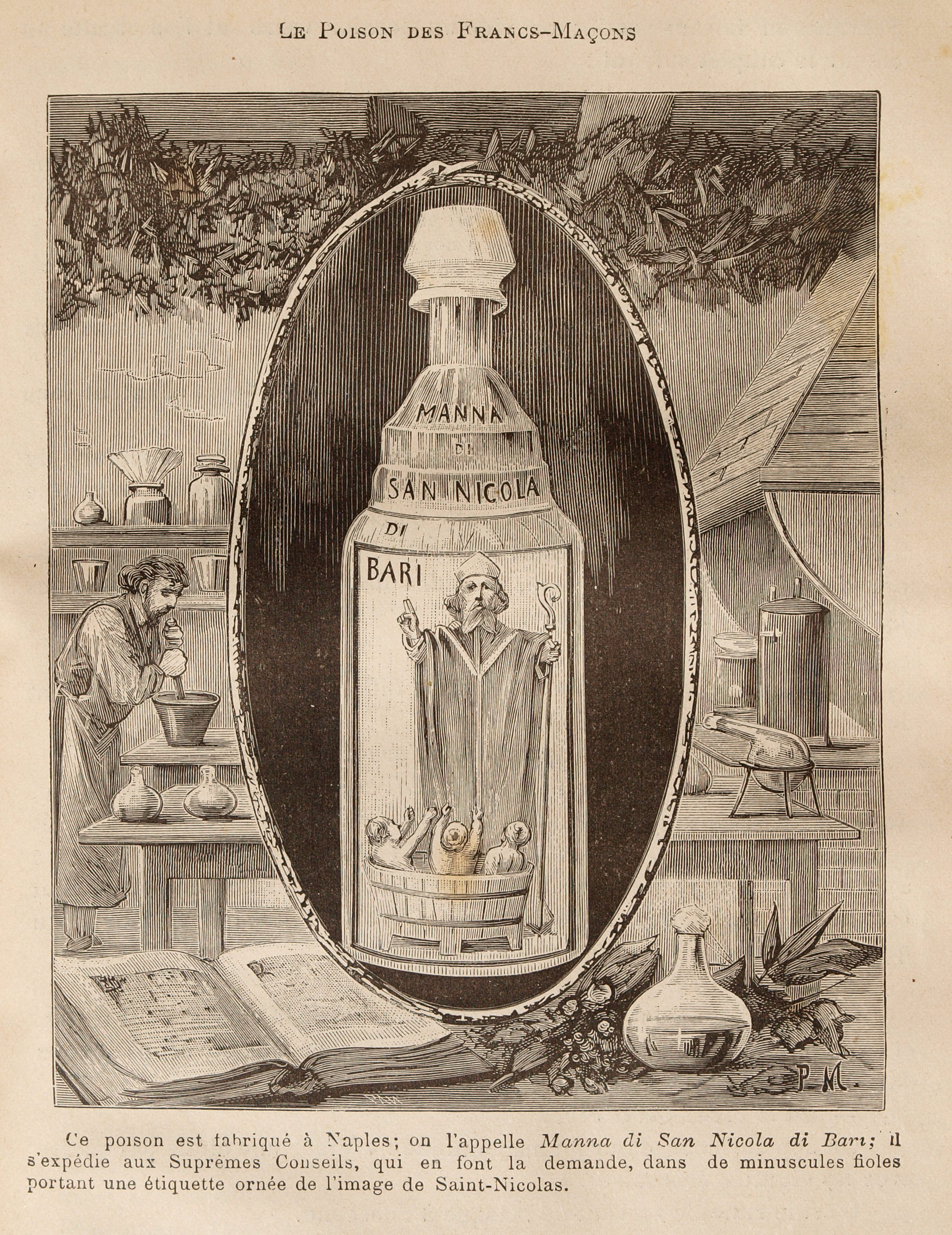
"Manna di San Nicola" (Aqua Tofana), Pierre Méjanel

The Spana Prosecution was a major criminal case which took place in Rome in the Papal States between January 1659 and March 1660.

The Papal authorities under the leadership of lieutenant governor Stefano Bracchi investigated a case involving a criminal net of poisoners, mainly women, for selling the famous poison Aqua Tofana to clients who wished to commit murder, in particular women who wished to become widows. The process involved over forty people, including professional poisoners and clients, some of them members of the aristocracy, and resulted in punishment ranging from exile and lifetime house arrest to the execution of five main figures, among them the central figure Gironima Spana.

== Background ==
In 1624, a woman by the name Giulia Mangiardi (1581–1651) arrived to Rome from Palermo in Sicily. Her proper name was Giulia Mangiardi, but she has traditionally become known in history under the invented name "Giulia Tofana", because she was the inventor of the poison Aqua Tofana, which she sold commercially in Palermo. Traditionally, she is said to have named the poison after her alleged mother Thofania d'Adamo, but there is nothing to indicate that d'Adamo was the mother of Giulia Mangiardi, though Mangiardi may have been her disciple.

Since her second husband Ranchetti Cesare (1564–1654) wasted the family money, she started to manufacture and sell the poison in Rome to support the family. Historians point to her dying in her sleep in 1651 with no one aware of her poisoning activities.

Her business was taken over by stepdaughter from her first marriage with Niccolo Spano Lorestino, Gironima Spana, who was established as an astrologer, but had been initiated by her stepmother in how to manufacture and sell the poison. Gironima Spana appears to have expanded the business inherited from her stepmother. She manufactured the poison and sold it personally, but she also employed women associates to sell the poison for her: in at least some cases, these associates were former clients. Normally her associates only sold the poison, but in some cases, notably in the case of Giovanna De Grandis, she also taught them to manufacture it. Since the apothecaries did not sell arsenic to women, Spana and Giovanna De Grandis employed the service of the male priest Padre Don Girolamo as a go-between. The poison was mainly sold to women clients, often women in unhappy marriages, with the intent to murder their husbands. Gironima Spana, in her career as an astrologer, had access to wealthy clients among the Roman aristocracy. It appears that the business was successful enough to expand outside of the then city borders of Rome, as the Spana organization employed at least one seller, Maddalena Ciampella, in Palestrina.

== Investigation ==
On 31 January 1659, the poison dealer Giovanna De Grandis was arrested in flagrante in Rome, charged with trafficking a lethal poison and imprisoned at the Tor di Nona for questioning. The investigation was handled by the Papal authorities under the leadership of lieutenant governor Stefano Bracchi. The investigation was to result in the major Spana Prosecution, which was to last until March 1660.

Giovanna de Grandis confessed her guilt on 1 February. After her confession she started to name names of her business associates and clients. Her testimony was essential to the development of the Spana Prosecution. She pointed out Gironima Spana herself, who was arrested on 2 February, followed by a number of arrests and interrogations of accused poison dealers and clients. Between 10 and 11 February, Elena Gabrielli Cassana, Angela Armellina, Elena Ferri and Teresa Verzellina were all arrested. Gironima Spana herself resisted the interrogation for months until she finally made her confession.

The arrested people were imprisoned in the Papal prison of Tor di Nona for questioning. Torture was sometimes used during the interrogations, but only in individual cases and not routinely. When used, it was normally in the form of the strappado. The prisoners were also confronted with each other. Each person was interrogated to make their own confession and name accomplices and clients. With this method, the investigation grew in number. Eventually, over 40 people were involved in the investigation.

Some of the clients named for having bought and used poison were not arrested. Many of them, particularly those belonging to the upper classes, were left out of the formal investigation in consideration of their social status. In the case when they were interrogated, the interrogation did not take place at the Tor di Nona but in their private residence after they had been granted Papal immunity in exchange for a confession, which ensured that they would be given no formal sentence. One such incident was the case of the noblewoman Anna Maria Conti, who was interrogated in her own home; she confessed herself guilty after having been granted Papal immunity, and was thus not punished.

The Papal authorities viewed the women who manufactured and sold poison as more guilty than the women who bought and actually used the lethal poison. In the end, only seven women were executed. On 5 July 1659, the central figure Gironima Spana and her four associates Giovanna De Grandis, Maria Spinola, Graziosa Farina and Laura Crispoldi were all executed by hanging on Campo de' Fiori. These five executions were followed by the hanging of Cecili Verzellina 6 March 1660; on the same day, Teresa Verzellina, Benedetta Merlini and Cecilia Gentili were flogged through the streets and banished. Many others were sentenced to house arrest or banishment, while a large part of those accused had been given Papal immunity in exchange for their confession.

The Spana Prosecution ended with the find of a bottle with a liquid in the garden of Spana on 17 March 1660. The liquid was given to a dog at Tor di Nona, who died on 22 March. With this, the investigation was finally closed. The Pope gave the order that the documents regarding the trial should be sealed at the Castel Sant'Angelo, since he wished to avoid spreading knowledge about the poison and the bad example of the women. The archives were not discovered again until the 1880s in the Archivo di Stato.

== Aftermath ==
The Spana Prosecution was a major scandal which became infamous already when it occurred. Francesco Sforza Pallavicino used the Spana Prosecution in the 1660s as his paradigm for "pontifical commitment to law and order", and the case was often commented by Italian jurists during the 18th century.

During the 17th and 18th centuries, the trial was often the subject of crime chronicles and described in various sensationalist literature, becoming heavily influenced by myths and legends with time. A typical early description was: "Account of the most Grievous Crime of Making the Poisonous Beverage Acquetta or Acqua Toffanica, Concocted and Put to Use in Rome by Gironima Spara and Four Other Companions, all Widows, who Poisoned their Husbands and Many Other Men, and Were All Hanged".

Popular myth described an organization of female serial killers who murdered hundreds of husbands until they were caught in a trap by a Papal governor. The name of Gironima Spana was spelled in various different ways. Gironima Spana has been confused with her stepmother Giulia Mangiardi, who has been popularly referred to by the name Giulia Tofana because she invented the poison Aqua Tofana. Giulia Mangiardi has been claimed to be the daughter of the poisoner Tofania d'Adamo (executed in 1633), and sometimes claimed to be one of those executed in 1659, despite in fact having been dead for eight years by then.

The poison Aqua Tofana and consequently its inventor "Giulia Tofana" (Giulia Mangiardi) and the Spana Prosecution became famous and heavily mythologized during the 19th century, and many incorrect statements about the subject became repeated as facts long into the 20th century.

== People implicated ==
This is a list of people who were formally charged, accused, interrogated or otherwise implicated in the Spana organization of processional poisoners which were put on trial during the Spana Prosecution. They are mentioned by name (sorted by first name, which was the custom during the case), form of involvement, and the legal action taking place against them, or absence thereof.

- Amadei, Monsignor, client of Gironima Spana; never arrested or interrogated.
- Angela Armellina Ferri Cencietti (born 1629), poison seller, accused of having poisoned her husband the barber Giuseppe Cencietti (d. 1655); tortured, refused to confess. Banished in January 1660.
- Anna Crevellaro, client of Giulia Tofana, accused of having poisoned her husband, a sieve maker, in 1649; never formally charged.
- Anna Maria Caterina Aldobrandini (1630–1703), client of Gironima Spana; accused of having poisoned her husband, Francesco Maria, the Duke of Cesi (d. 1657); never charged.
- Anna Maria Conti (born 1639), painter's wife, accused of having poisoned her husband, Simon Imbert (d. 1658); given Papal immunity and confessed.
- Antonio, Count Leonardi (or Lunardi), accused of being the accomplice of Teresa Verzellina in her murder of her husband; never charged.
- Antonio Lipperi, husband of Maria Spinola, accused of being to collaborator of his wife; released.
- Benedetta Merlini, servant of Anna Maria Conti, accused of having introduced Conti to the poisoner Laura Crispoldi; flogged and banished in March 1660.
- Camilla Capella, client of Laura Crispoldi, accused of having poisoned her husband, the innkeeper Andrea Borelli (d. 1657); claimed to have used the poison only to reform his behaviour. Exiled in March 1660.
- Caterina Gianotti, wife of the painter Filippo Gagliardi, accused of having poisoned her first husband the gilder Francesco Baldeschi (d. 1649); interrogated but released.
- Caterina Luisati, accused of having poisoned her abusive husband Marc'Antonio Ranieri (d. 1658); given Papal immunity and confessed.
- Caterina Nucci (born 1622), accused of having poisoned her first husband the butcher Antonio Romieri (d. 1654) and her second husband the cloth cutter Giuseppe Rosati (d. 1655); given Papal immunity and confessed. Sentenced to house arrest for life in July 1659.
- Cecilia Gentili (Ceciliaccia, La Sorda), poison seller; flogged and exiled in March 1660.
- Cecilia Verzellina, confessed to have tricked her daughter Teresa Verzellina to poison her son-in-law the dyer Giovanni Pietro Beltrammi (d. 1658); hanged on 6 March 1660.
- Elena Ferri Contarini (born 1634), accused of having poisoned her husband the linen draper Antonio Contarini (d 1655) and for selling poison; tortured but did not confess. Exiled in January 1660.
- Elena Gabrielli Cassana (born 1627), aunt of Angela Armellina and Elena Ferri, accused of having poisoned her husband Francesco Ladi (d. 1655), butler of cardinal Francesco Barberini, and of selling poison; tortured but did not confess. Exiled in January 1660, remitted in 1671.
- Elisabetta (Betta) Gentili (died 1656/57), accused of having poisoned her nephew, son of Cecilia Gentili.
- Francesca Fabbri, client of Cecilia Gentili, accused of having poisoned her husband the tailor Paolo Palazzi; eventually released.
- Francesca Fiori, poisoner; exiled in March 1660.
- Francesca "Cecca" Flore (b. 1595), personal servant of Gironima Spana and an important witness toward her.
- Francesca Laurenti Giuli, accused of having poisoned her husband the mattress maker Antonio Giuli (d. 1658); sentenced to house arrest for life in March 1660.
- Giovanna De Grandis (la Cavamacchie), laundress and poisoner, associate of Gironima Spana; confessed to have manufactured and sold poison, hanged on 5 July 1659.
- Gironima Spana (1615–1659), poisoner and astrologer, manufactured and sold poison and was the head of the poison network; hanged on 5 July 1659.
- Giulia Mangiardi (in history traditionally called "Giulia Tofana" ) (1581–1651), poisoner, stepmother of Gironima Spana; taught her stepdaughter to manufacture the Aqua Tofana poison and left her business to her when she died.
- Graziosa Farina, poisoner; confessed, hanged on 5 July 1659.
- Laura Crispoldi, poisoner; confessed to have sold poison to Anna Maria Conti and Camilla Capella, hanged on 5 July 1659.
- Lucia Bettona (died 1656), client of Elena Ferri Contarini, accused of having poisoned her brother Giovanni Battista Bettoni.
- Lucia Bonafide Vantucci, accused of having poisoned her daughters abusive husband Castore Sartorio (d. 1655), cavaliere of the Quirinal Palace; interrogated but released.
- Maddalena, signora, wife of cardincal vicar's chief of police, bought poison from Cecilia Gentili; never arrested.
- Maddalena Ciampella (or Trampella), the organization's poison dealer in Palestrina; exiled in December 1659.
- Margherita Carosi; claimed that Cecilia Gentili attempted to sell her poison.
- Maria Spinola (also called Maria Palermitana and Maria Siciliana; born 1600), poisoner, associate of Gironima Spana since 1650; confessed, hanged on 5 July 1659.
- Padre Don Girolamo (died 1658), renegade exorcist priest; bought arsenic from apothecaries for the female poison manufacturers (apothecaries refused to sell arsenic to women), acted as a go-between and provided the Duchess of Cesi with poison from Gironima Spana.
- Sulpizia Vitelleschi, noblewomen heiress, client of Gironima Spana, accused of having poisoned her husband Antonio de Taxis (d. 1656).
- Teresa Verzellina, daughter of Cecilia Verzellina, accused of having poisoned her husband, the dyer Giovanni Pietro Beltrammi (d. 1658); flogged and banished in March 1660.

== Fiction ==
The Spana investigation has been fictionalized in the novel The Poison Keeper by Deborah Swift (2021) and The Book of Secrets by Anna Mazzola (2024).

It has been the subject of the opera “Aqua Tofana” by the Italian librettist Fabrizio Funari with music by composer Gaia Aloisi (2024).

== See also ==
- La Voisin – French fortune teller and poisoner (d. 1680)
- Affair of the Poisons – 17th century murder scandal in France
