= Antonia Coresi =

Italian opera soprano

Antonia "Tonia" Coresi (fl. 1655 – fl. 1674) was an Italian opera soprano.

Born Antonia Angelotti, she originally came from Rome. She was married to the Florentine operatic tenor Nicola Coresi.

She was a primadonna at the Opera in Venice between 1655 and 1672. Between 1670 and 1674, she was engaged by Christina, Queen of Sweden in Rome. Queen Christina founded the first public theatre- and opera house, the Teatro Tordinona. The Teatro Tordinona was inaugurated in January 1671 with the opera Scipione affricano by Francesco Cavalli, with Antonia Coresi as Scipione and Medea, and Angelica Quadrelli as Sofonisba and Isifile.

The performance was a sensation, because women were formally banned from performing onstage in the city of Rome; and while this ban was overlooked in the private theatres of the nobility, the Teatro Tordinona was meant to be a public theare, albeit in a special position because it was privately owned by the queen. Queen Christina engaged several women to perform: aside from Antonia Coresi and Angelica Quadrelli, she also engaged Maria Landini and Angela Voglia. Teatro Tordinona was however closed in 1674, and the ban on female actors and stage performers was reinforced in 1686.
