= Graziosa Farina =

Italian poisoner

Graziosa Farina (died 5 July 1659, Rome) was a Roman poisoner. She was one of the central figures of the infamous Spana Prosecution, one of only six to be executed among over forty people to be implicated.

== Life ==
Graziosa Farina was born in Rome. She was recruited to the organization of Gironima Spana which trafficked in lethal poison. Similarly to her colleague Laura Crispoldi, Farina was a saleswoman, selling the poison provided for her by Giovanna De Grandis. She does not appear to have had any direct contact with Spana herself. Described as a beggar woman, she recruited clients among the women in the many churches she visited as a beggar.

On 31 January 1659, Giovanna De Grandis was arrested and imprisoned in the Papal prison at Tor di Nona, where she made her confession on 1 February, and started to name the names of her accomplices and clients. Prior to her arrest, De Grandis had suspected that she was watched by the authorities, and left a box with Farina containing the equipment De Grandis used when making poison. Farina was named by De Grandis and arrested 7 February. She was a very cooperative witness. She was exposed to torture, confessed the day after her arrest, and named a number of names. Among them were Elena Gabrielli Cassana, Angela Armellina and Elena Ferri. She was confronted with several of her co-prisoners, identified and testified toward several of them. She identified and testified against her colleague Laura Crispoldi.

On 5 July 1659, Gironima Spana, Giovanna De Grandis, Maria Spinola, Graziosa Farina, and Laura Crispoldi were executed by hanging on Campo de' Fiori in Rome.
