= Laura Crispoldi =

Italian poisoner

Laura Crispoldi (died 5 July 1659, Rome) was a Roman poisoner. She was one of the central figures of the infamous Spana Prosecution, one of only six to be executed among over forty people to be implicated.

== Life ==
Crispoldi was born in Rome. She was recruited to the organization of Gironima Spana that trafficked in lethal poison. She was a prolific saleswoman, selling the poison provided for her by Giovanna De Grandis.

On 31 January 1659, Giovanna De Grandis was arrested and imprisoned in the Papal prison at Tor di Nona where she made her confession on 1 February, and started to name the names of her accomplices and clients. Her colleague Maria Spinola named Crispoldi as the dealer who sold poison to two women accused of having poisoned their late husbands, Anna Maria Conti and Camilla Capella, and described her as a ruthless and wicked woman with many clients. Crispoldi was described as strong and resisted confession for a long time.

On 5 July 1659, Gironima Spana, Giovanna De Grandis, Maria Spinola, Graziosa Farina, and Crispoldi were executed by hanging on Campo de' Fiori in Rome.
