= Angelica Quadrelli =

Angelica Quadrelli (fl. 1674) was an Italian opera soprano and musician.

In 1670, she was engaged at the court of queen Christina in Rome. She was a singer, but she was also an instrumental musician, who played the harp and the oboe.

Queen Christina founded the first public theatre and opera house in Rome, the Teatro Tordinona. The Opera theater was inaugurated in January 1671 with the opera Scipione Affricano by Francesco Cavalli, in which two women performed: Antonia Coresi as Scipione and Medea, and Angelica Quadrelli as Sofonisba and Isifile. The performance was a sensation: legally, women were prohibited to perform in public in the Papal States, and while this ban was observed on the private theatres in the palaces of the Roman noble families, the initiative of Christina was new because Teatro Tordinona was a public stage, despite it having a special position because of the protection of queen Christina. The initiative was however not successful in the end; the Teatro Tordinona was closed down in 1674, and the prohibition on women performers were repeated on 1686.

Women did continue to perform in the private palace theaters of the nobility of Romen, however. Angelica Quadrelli was active as a singer in the court of Christina, as were several other women, such as Antonia Coresi, Maria Landini and Angela Voglia, who performed at the queen's entertainments.
