= Monument to Giordano Bruno =

Statue in Rome, Italy

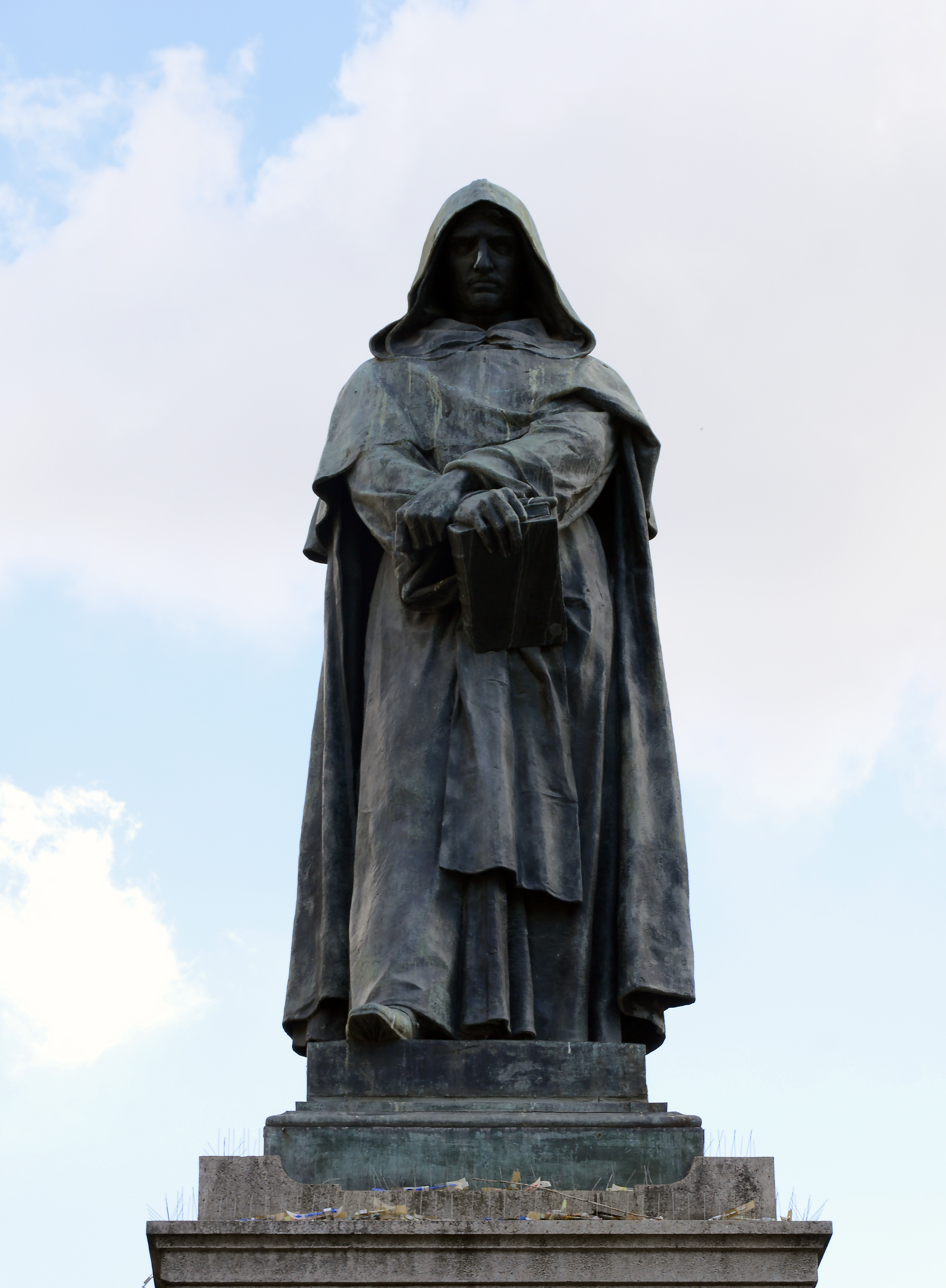
- Monument to Bruno in Campo de' Fiori, where he was executed
- Click on the map for a fullscreen view
- Location: 41°53′44″N 12°28′20″E

The Monument to Giordano Bruno, created by the Grand Master Mason Ettore Ferrari, was erected in 1889 at Campo de' Fiori square in Rome, Italy, to commemorate the Italian philosopher Giordano Bruno, who was burned there in 1600. Since its inception the idea of a monument dedicated to the executed heretic located in Rome, once the capital of the Papal States, has generated controversy between anti-clerical groups and those more aligned with the Roman Catholic church.

== Description ==
The inscription on the base reads:

A BRUNO - IL SECOLO DA LUI DIVINATO - QUI DOVE IL ROGO ARSE

(English: To Bruno - The Age he Predicted (erected this monument) - Here Where the Stake Burned)

Along the top of the plinth are eight medallions with bust reliefs; they depict the Venetian Paolo Sarpi, the Calabrian Tommaso Campanella, the Frenchman Petrus Ramus, the Roman Lucilio Vanini, the Italian Aonio Paleario; the Spaniard Michele Serveto, the Englishman John Wycliffe, and the Bohemian Jan Hus. In 1991, it was rediscovered that the medallion with a bust of Vanini also had a small portrait of Martin Luther. All these individuals had clashed with religious authorities; all but Serveto (who was burned for heresy by Swiss Calvinists) had conflict with the Catholic church. The medallion depicting Paolo Sarpi was previously intended to represent Galileo, but since the astronomer had recanted his beliefs, he was felt not to fit in with the other recalcitrant thinkers.

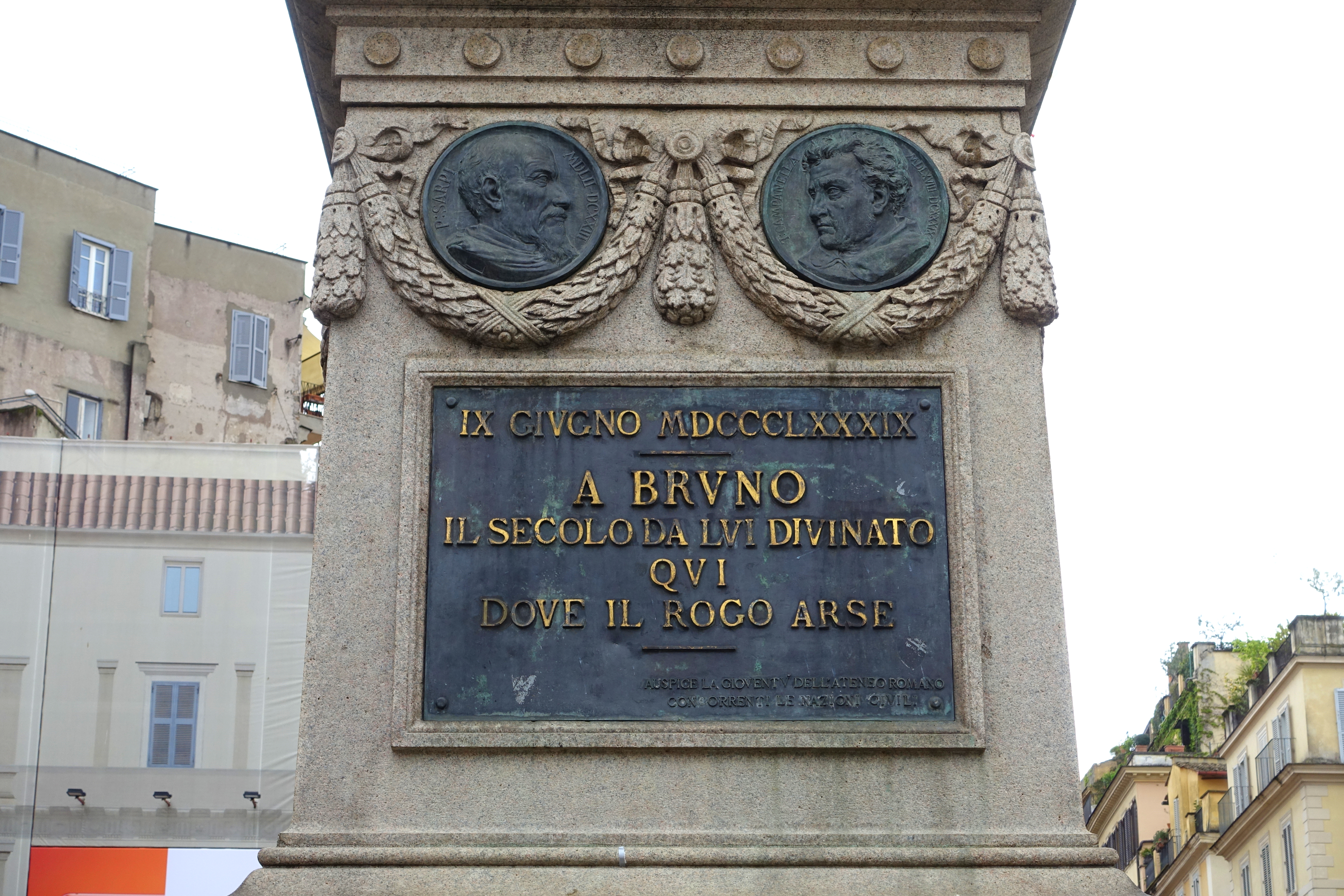
Sarpi and Campanella medallions

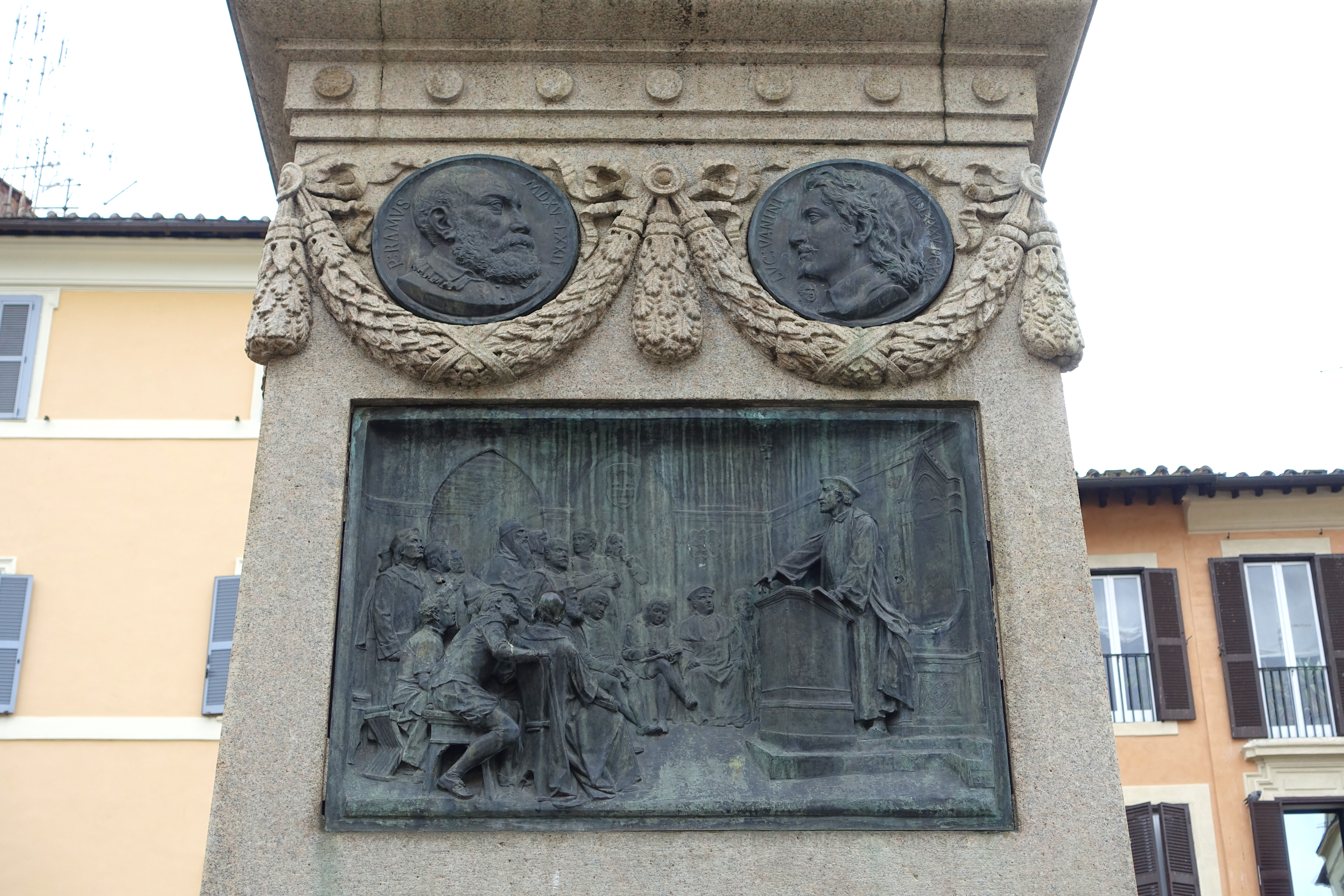
Ramus and Vanini medallions

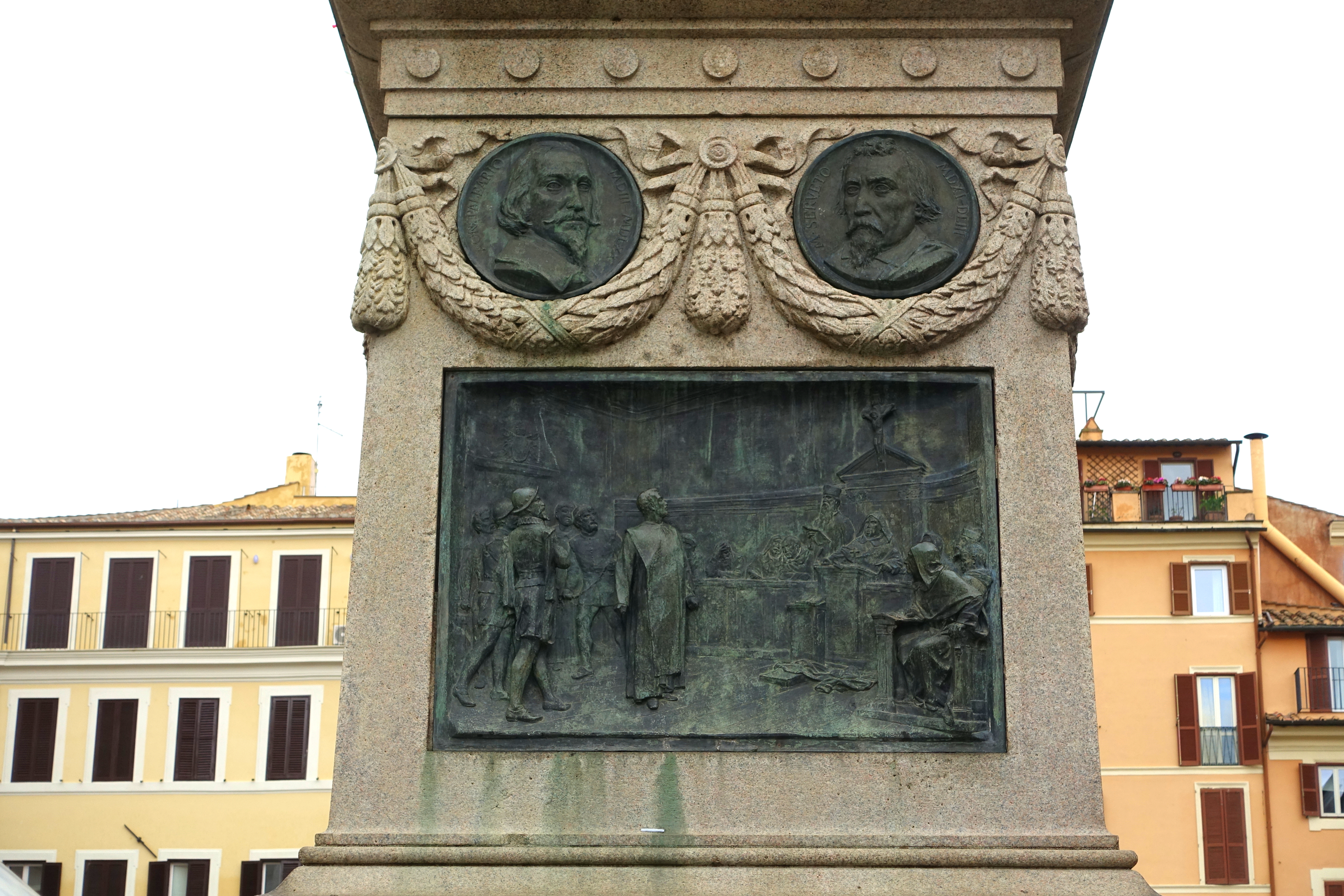
Paleario and Serveto medallions

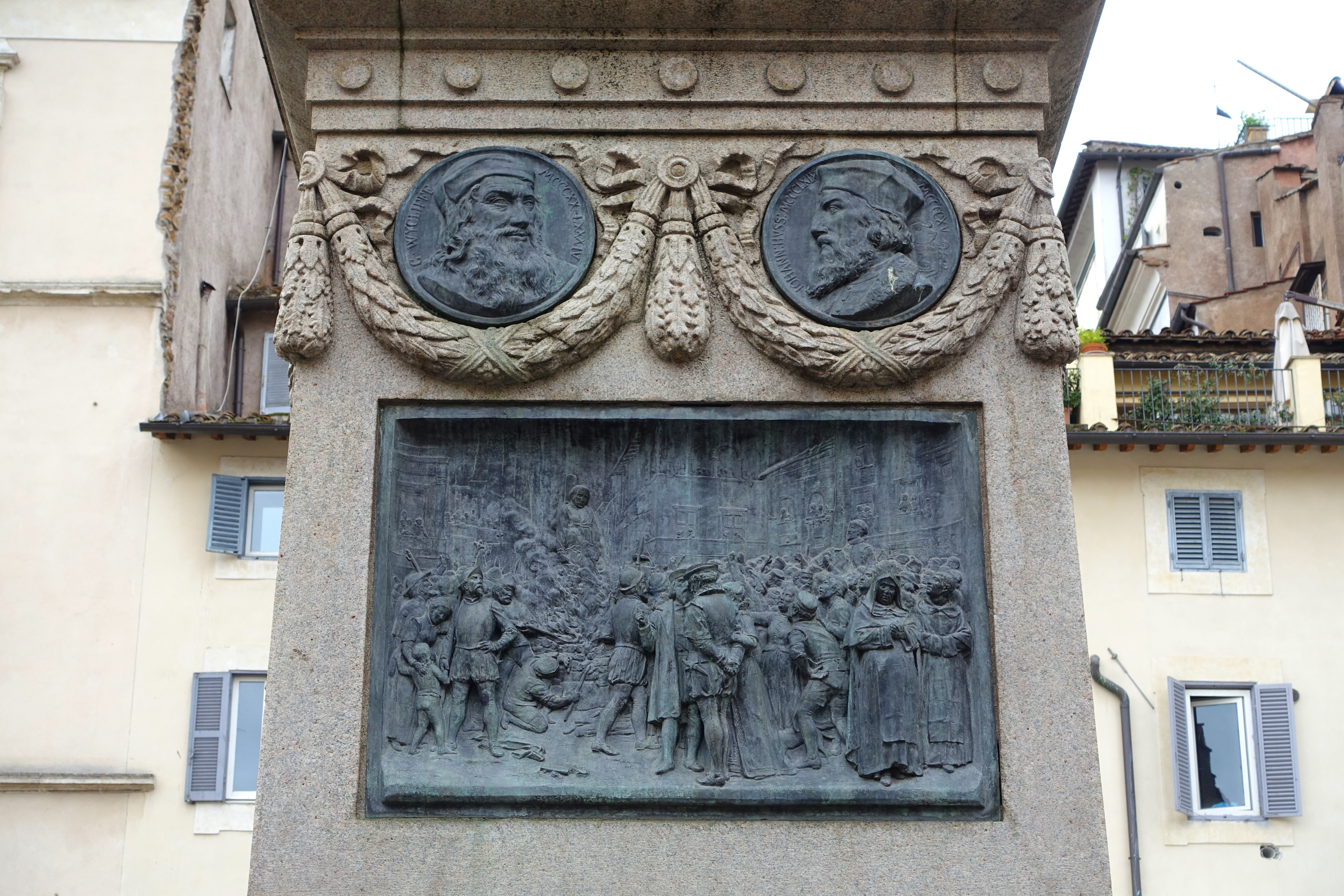
Wycliffe and Hus medallions

== History ==
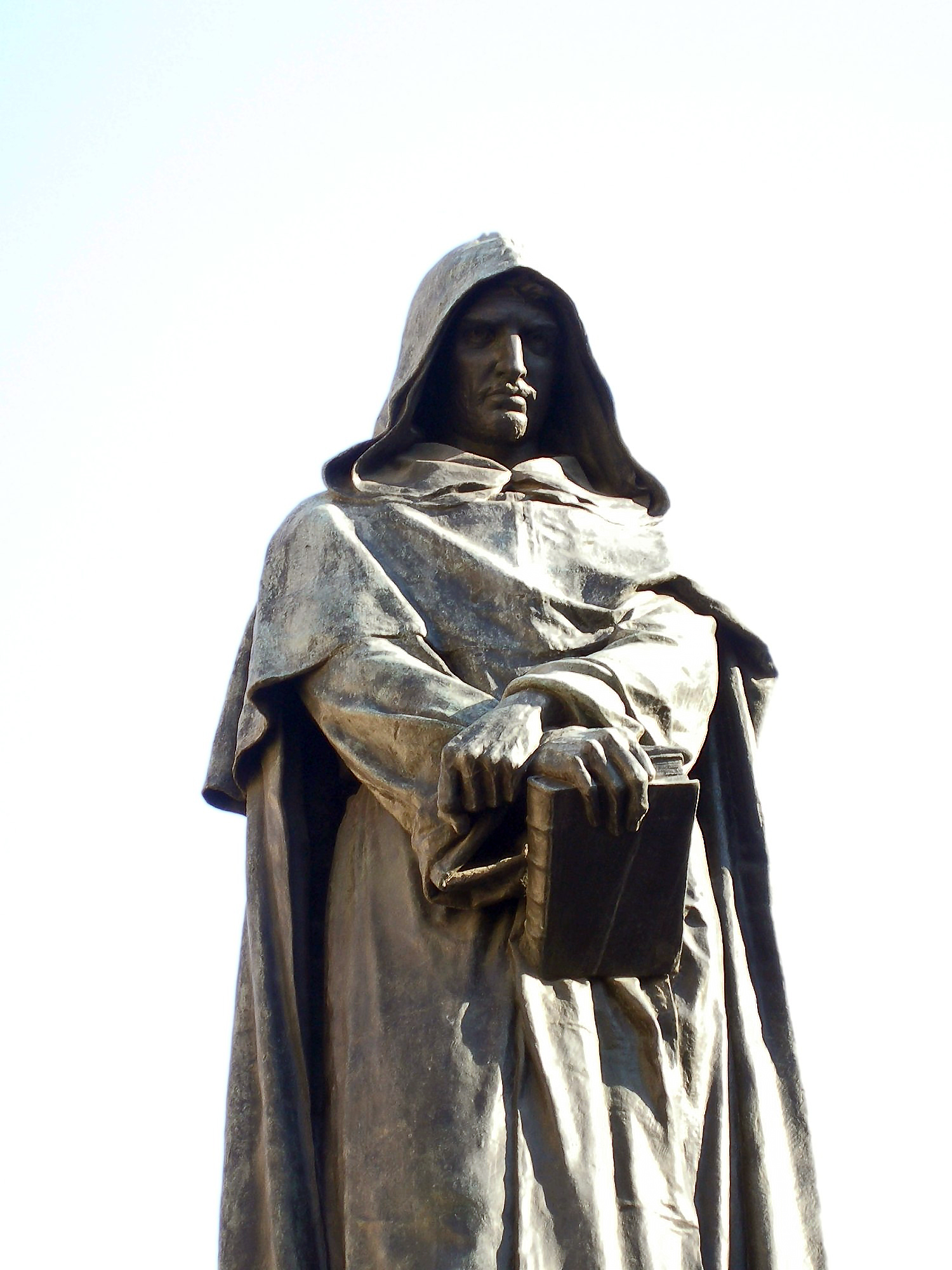
Close-up of the statue.

The sculptor, Ettore Ferrari, would later become the Grand master of the Grande Oriente d'Italia, the Masonic jurisdiction of Italy. Masons had strongly supported the removal of Papal rule of Rome, and its incorporation into either a republic or the unification of Italy under the Piedmontese Savoyard monarchy. His other sculptures include a monument in Rovigo dedicated to Giuseppe Garibaldi, who fought for Italian independence.

On 20 April 1884, Pope Leo XIII published the encyclical Humanum genus. Soon after, the Freemasons decided to create a statue of the pantheist Giordano Bruno. The monument was funded with private donations, mainly a subscription started by students at the University of Rome, and the national councils of state did not prevent its erection. The council of the commune of Rome approve on 10 December 1888, by vote of 36 to 13, the location of the monument to Campo di Fiori. There was strong opposition by the Catholic church against what was viewed as an offense against religion.

The statue was unveiled on 9 June 1889, at the site where Bruno was burnt at the stake for heresy on 17 February 1600, and the radical politician Giovanni Bovio gave a speech surrounded by about 100 Masonic flags. Since thousands of individuals and students aligned with anticlerical movements had congregated in Rome for the unveiling, the Vatican had closed the museum and warned local churches and parishes to shutter their doors to avoid confrontations or incidents from what they considered an atheistic mob. In October 1890, Pope Leo XIII issued a further warning to Italy in his encyclical Ab Apostolici against Freemasonry; he commented on the monument in the following passage:

that eminently sectarian work, the erection of the monument to the renowned apostate of Nola, which, with the aid and favour of the government, was promoted, determined, and carried out by means of Freemasonry, whose most authorised spokesmen were not ashamed to acknowledge its purpose and to declare its meaning. Its purpose was to insult the Papacy; its meaning that, instead of the Catholic Faith, must now be substituted the most absolute freedom of examination, of criticism, of thought, and of conscience: and what is meant by such language in the mouth of the sects is well known.

== Present day ==
Every year, on the anniversary of his execution, various groups of freethinkers — Masons, atheists, pantheists — gather at the monument, and a representative of Rome's mayoralty places a wreath at its feet.

A statue of a stretched human figure standing on its head designed by Alexander Polzin depicting Bruno's death at the stake was placed in Potsdamer Platz station in Berlin, Germany, on March 2, 2008.
