= Maria Spinola =

Italian poisoner

Maria Spinola (died 5 July 1659, Rome) was a Sicilian poisoner. She was one of the central figures of the infamous Spana Prosecution, one of only six to be executed among over forty people to be implicated.

== Life ==
Spinola was born in Palermo. She emigrated from Sicily to Naples, and from there to Rome in 1627. She was married four times and lived under limited economic circumstances.

In 1650, she became the personal friend of Gironima Spana and was recruited to her organization in trafficking in lethal poison. She was an important member of the Spana organisation: she had direct contact with Spana, and recruited clients to Spana's business as an astrologer (and her unofficial business as a poison seller).

On 31 January 1659, Giovanna De Grandis was arrested and imprisoned in the Papal prison at Tor di Nona, where she made her confession on 1 February, and started to name the names of her accomplices and clients. Spinola was named by De Grandis and arrested in February, the same month as the arrest of Spana herself. Spinola was an important witness toward Spana herself, having had direct access to her rather than indirectly through De Grandis, which was the case with many other associates, as well as being a personal friend.

On 5 July 1659, Gironima Spana, Giovanna De Grandis, Maria Spinola, Graziosa Farina, and Laura Crispoldi were executed by hanging on Campo de' Fiori in Rome.
