= Ettore Ferrari =

Italian sculptor (1845-1929)

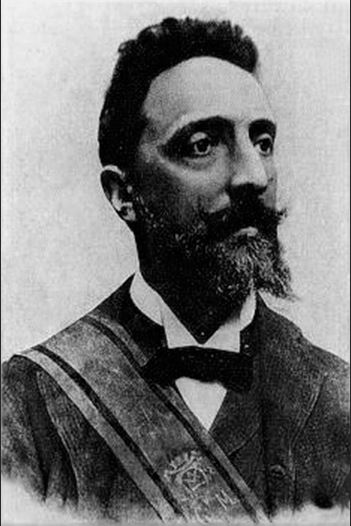
- Born: 25 March 1845; Rome
- Died: 19 August 1931 (aged 86); Rome
- Known for: Sculpture

Ettore Ferrari (Rome, 25 March 1845 – Rome, 19 August 1929) was an Italian sculptor and Grand Master Mason.

== Biography ==
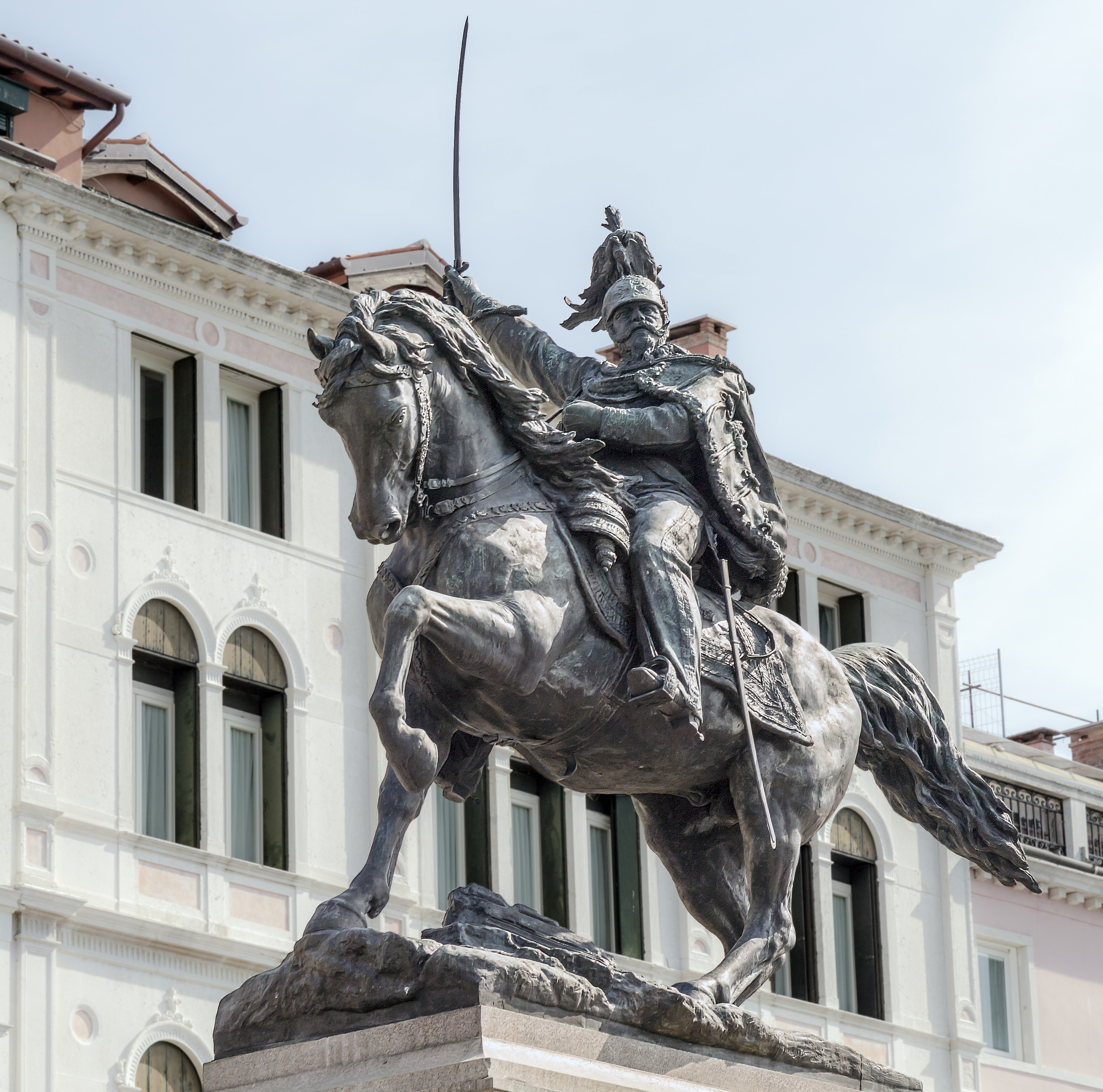
Monument to Victor Emmanuel II Venice

Born in Rome to an artistic family (his father was also a painter), Ferrari was one of the members of the artistic rebirth in the secular state born after the Italian Unification. For a long time, he was a professor at the Accademia di San Luca, a deputy in the Italian Parliament and Grand Master of the Grande Oriente d'Italia. the main Masonic body in Italy.

Ettore Ferrari and Pio Piacentini in 1884 provided the rough draft plans for constructing a permanent monument, the Victor Emmanuel II Monument that celebrates Victor Emmanuel II of Italy (the first king of a united Italy) and that also commemorates "Risorgimento", the Italian unification that followed the military defeat and dissolution of the temporal Papal States empire.

In 1887, Ferrari created a statue of Ovid for the city of Constanţa, Romania (the ancient Tomis, where the Latin poet was exiled), and this statue was duplicated in 1925 for Sulmona, Ovid's birthplace. Another important work is the bronze statue of Giuseppe Garibaldi, created in 1892, located in Pisa in the square with the same name.

Ferrari also sculpted the statue for the controversial Monument to Giordano Bruno in Campo de' Fiori, Rome.

In the summer of 1881, Ferrari was initiated into the Masonic lodge "Rienzi" in Rome, becoming its Grand Master in 1892. In 1897, he became Grand Secretary of the Grand Orient of Italy under the direction of Adriano Lemmi and Ernesto Nathan to whom he remained always a close friend. From 1904 to 1917, he took the role of Grand Master of the Grand Orient of Italy.

Among his students was Ermenegildo Luppi.
