= Thofania d'Adamo =

Italian poisoner

Thofania d'Adamo or Teofania di Adamo, Epifania d'Adamo or La Tofania (died 12 July 1633, Palermo) was a Sicilian poisoner.

== Case ==
d'Adamo was executed for having poisoned her late spouse Francesco d'Adamo and for having trafficked in illegal lethal poison. She was preceded by Francesca La Sarda, who was executed for having trafficked in illegal lethal poison the year prior. The two women were accused of having sold poison together in Palermo. The case attracted a lot of attention and the investigation was conducted on the orders of Fernando Afán de Ribera.

== Legacy ==
The case is first mentioned in the Compendio di diversi successi in Palermo dall’anno 1632 by Baldassare Zamparrone (1581–1648). The contemporary diarist Gaetano Alessis described in Notizie piacevoli e curiose ossia aneddoti…, in which he claimed that the poison Aqua Tofana was invented by her and named after her.

Thofania d'Adamo is known in history as the alleged mother of the famous poisoner Giulia Tofana. According to legend, Giulia Tofana fled to Rome after the execution of her mother Thofania d'Adamo, founded a new business selling poison in Rome, and named the poison Aqua Tofana after her mother. However, this appears to have been a myth, inspired by a hypothesis in the 19th century. Giulia Tofana, whose actual name was Giulia Mangiardi, left Palermo for Rome in 1624 and not 1633; and while she does appear to have founded a business selling poison In Rome, which she eventually left to her stepdaughter Gironima Spana, there is nothing to indicate that Thofania d'Adamo was the mother of Giulia Mangiardi, although she may have been her disciple.
