= Anna Mazzola =

English author and lawyer

- Born: Anna Sarah Mazzola; July 1978 (age 48); Croydon, London, England
- Other name: Anna Sharpe
- Education: Pembroke College, Oxford; University of Law
- Years active: 2014–present
- Children: 2
- Website: annamazzola.com

Anna Sarah Mazzola (born July 1978) is an English author and lawyer best known for writing historical crime fiction. Her work has received a number of accolades, including an Edgar Award and Gold Dagger. She also writes legal thrillers under the name Anna Sharpe.

== Early life ==
Mazzola is from Croydon, Greater London and attended Croydon High School. Her father was born in Palermo and grew up in Naples before moving to England. Mazzola graduated with a Bachelor of Arts (BA) in English from Pembroke College, Oxford and a Postgraduate Diploma and LPC from the University of Law. She later enrolled in the Novel Studio at City, University of London.

== Career ==
Mazzola began writing short stories while on maternity leave. She continued to work for the law firm Bindmans as she pursued writing professionally, later moving to Birnbergs and CWJ. Ahead of the publication of her debut novel, Mazzola was a runner-up in the 2014 Grazia first chapter competition and the Brixton Bookjam Debut Novel competition. In a 2015 auction and a two-book deal, Tinder Press (a Headline Publishing Group imprint) won the rights to publisher Mazzola's debut novel The Unseeing in summer 2016. The novel is based on the 1837 murder of Hannah Brown by James Greenacre, also known as the Edgware Road murder, and the life of Sarah Gale. The Unseeing won an Edgar Allen Poe Award and was shortlisted for the Historical Writers' Association's Debut Crown.

The second novel in Mazzola's deal with Tinder Press, titled The Story Keeper, followed in 2018. Set on the Isle of Skye in 1857, the novel is inspired by Gaelic folklore. The Story Keeper was longlisted for the Highland Book Prize.

In 2020, Mazzola moved to Orion Publishing Group in 2020, through which she published her third novel The Clockwork Girl in 2022. The novel is set in 1750 Paris and features the class divide of pre-Revolutionary France. The Clockwork Girl was shortlisted for the Gold Dagger and the Historical Dagger at the 2023 Crime Writers' Association (CWA) Dagger Awards.

Mazzola's next gothic novel The House of Whispers was published in 2023, set in 1938 Rome as the rise of fascism threatens a piano teacher and her friends. The House of Whispers won the Fingerprint Award at the Capital Crime Festival. Antonia Senior and Nick Rennison of The Sunday Times named The House of Whispers one of the twelve best historical fiction novels of 2023.

That same year, Orion acquired two further novels from Mazzola, including the gothic novel The Book of Secrets, published in February 2024. Set in 17th-century Rome, the novel is based on the real life Gironima Spana case. In March 2024, The Book of Secrets featured on The Sunday Times list of new historical fiction.

As announced in 2022, Orion also acquired the rights to publish two legal thriller novels under Mazzola's pseudonym Anna Sharpe. The first of these was Notes on a Drowning in 2025, which the author based on her own experiences working as a lawyer. The second is Lie for Your Life in 2026.

== Personal life ==
Mazzola lives in Camberwell with her husband and their two children.

== Bibliography ==
=== Novels ===
- The Unseeing (2016)
- The Story Keeper (2018)
- The Clockwork Girl (2022)
- The House of Whispers (2023)
- The Book of Secrets (2024)

==== As Anna Sharpe ====
- Notes on a Drowning (2025)
- Lie for Your Life (2026)

== Accolades ==
Year	Award	Category	Title	Result	Ref.
2017	Historical Writers Association (HWA) Awards	Debut Crown	The Unseeing	Longlisted	
2018	Edgar Awards	Best Paperback Original	The Unseeing	Won	
2018	Highland Book Prize		The Story Keeper	Longlisted	
2023	Dublin Literary Award		The Clockwork Girl	Longlisted	
2023	Crime Writers' Association (CWA) Awards	Gold Dagger	The Clockwork Girl	Shortlisted	
2023	Crime Writers' Association (CWA) Awards	Historical Dagger	The Clockwork Girl	Shortlisted	
2024	Fingerprint Awards	Historical Crime Book of the Year	The House of Whispers	Won	
2025	CWA Awards	Gold Dagger	The Book of Secrets	Won	
2025	CWA Awards	Historical Dagger	The Book of Secrets	Shortlisted	
