= Robert Challe =

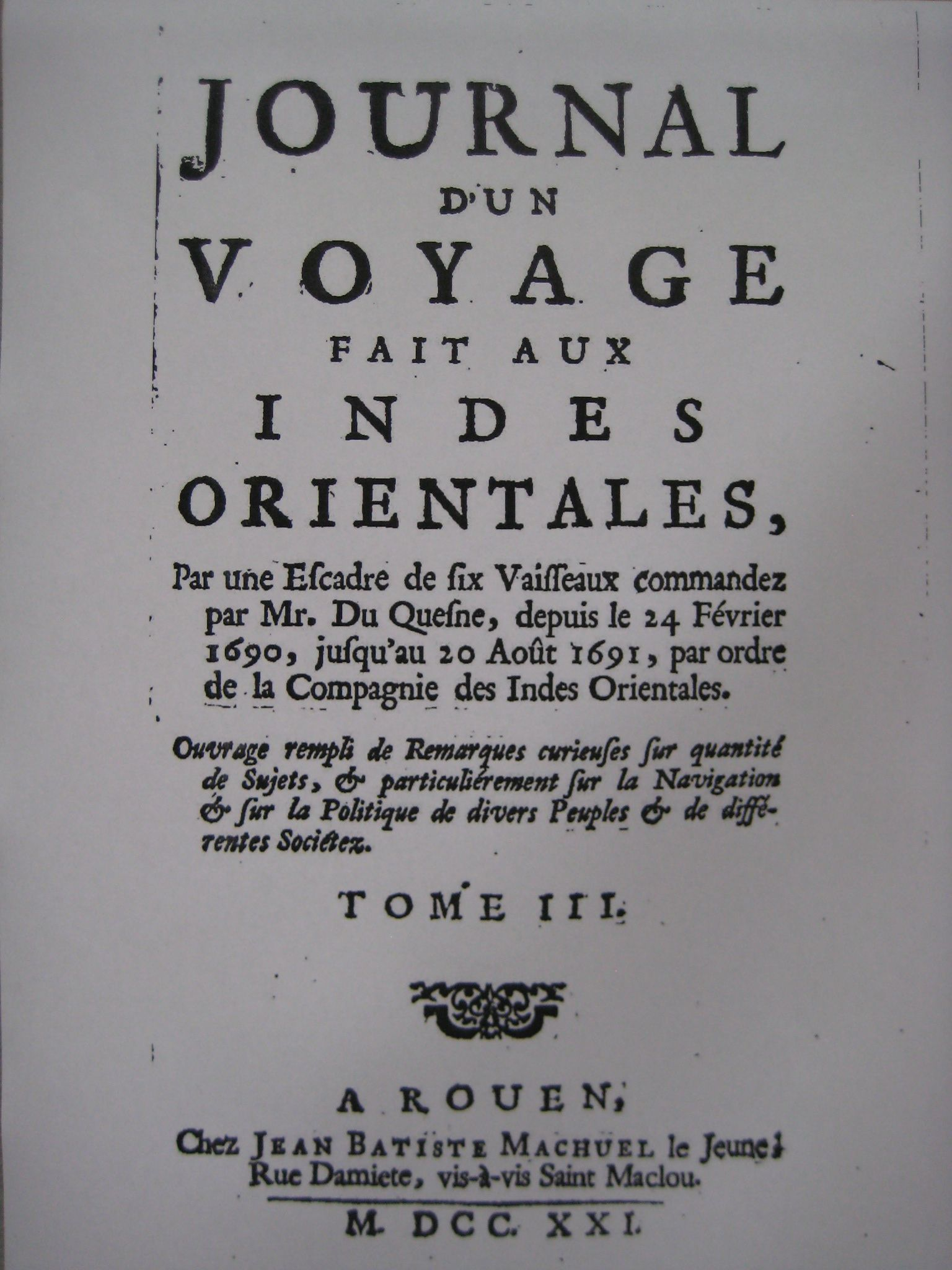
Robert Challe, Journal d'un Voyage faites aus Indes Orientales 1721

Robert Challe (17 August 1659 – 25 January 1721) was a French colonialist, voyager and writer, although he never published under his own name, which accounts for his obscurity until his re-discovery in the 1970s. His two most well-known works are fr:Les Illustres Françaises, published anonymously in The Hague in 1713, translated in English by Penelope Aubin in 1727 under the title The Illustrious French Lovers; being the true Histories of the Amours of several French Persons of Quality, and Journal d'un voyage fait aux Indes Orientales, published after his death in 1721.

Challe was born in Paris, the youngest of five children of the second marriage of a certain Jean Challe, a petit bourgeois and minor civil servant. He had two brothers and two sisters. He was an intelligent boy and a good scholar, and his life appears to have been comfortable until the death of his father in 1681. The influence of his mother, who seems to have preferred her oldest son, ensured that he was inequitably treated in his father's will, receiving only one tenth of the estate, and he entered into violent dispute with his two older brothers, fought a duel with one of them and injured him. Faced with either imprisonment or exile, he chose the latter, and left for New France.

With financial help from an uncle he at first bought a shareholding in Compagnie de pêches sédentaires de l'Acadie and later built up his own trading company, dealing in beaver skins, furs and other goods in Chédabouctou, Acadia (now part of Nova Scotia, Canada). His fortunes changed sharply in 1688, however, as a result of raids by English pirates from Salem and his business was ruined. One result of this experience was to arouse in him a contempt for the British, matched only, apparently, by his contempt for the Jesuits. He was forced to return to France, landing at La Rochelle.

In March 1690 he signed on as an ecrivain de navire, that is the purser or accountant, on a vessel sailing from Lorient in western France for Pondicherry, India, and other destinations in the Far East. The many adventures of the vessel on which he sailed, L'Ecueil, with a crew of 350 men and a veritable farmyard of fresh food on the hoof, are described in his two volume Journal d'un voyage fait aux Indes Orientales. The vessel, one of a fleet of six, was owned by the Compagnie des Indes Orientales and was an armed merchantman of 38 cannon, sailing for trade but also on a diplomatic mission to the Kingdom of Siam. On the return to France, the vessel stopped at Ascension Island, and then took a long detour across the Atlantic to the Antilles, where it made a long stop-over. It did not return to Port Louis, France until August 1691.

In 1692, Challe re-appears as an ecrivain de navire, but this time on a vessel of the French navy, Le Prince. He participated in the Battle of Barfleur against the English and Dutch. Challe's navy career was, however, short-lived, and he was discharged in either 1693 or 1694, possibly for corruption.

From 1695 onwards, he concentrated on writing, drawing on his previous adventures as a colonialist and seaman. He did not make a comfortable living. He published a work on Don Quixote as well as Les Illustres and the Journal.

In 1717 he was denounced by a police spy for seditious remarks in a Paris cafe and was imprisoned in the famous fr:Chatelet(Paris) prison. On being released he was exiled from Paris, and took up residence in Chartres.

He died, poor and broken-spirited, on 25 January 1721.

== Works ==
- fr:Les Illustres Françaises

A more extensive list of works is given at fr:Robert Challe

== Bibliography ==
- Hollier, Denis. A New History of French Literature. Cambridge: Harvard University Press, 1989. ISBN 0-674-61565-4. pp. 398–401.
