= Angela Voglia =

Italian opera singer

Angela "La Giorgina" Voglia (fl. 1671 – fl. 1714) was an Italian opera soprano.

She was engaged by Christina, Queen of Sweden in Rome. In 1671 Christina founded the first public theatre in Rome, Teatro Tordinona, and employed several female stage artists despite the ban on women performing on stage in the city of Rome. Angela Voglia performed at the concerts arranged by Christina in her private court. She was involved in a number of scandals concerning her love affairs and was reputed to be a courtesan, but she was protected against the Papal authorities by the royal patronage of Christina. In 1686, the Pope reinforced the ban on women stage performers because of the scandal of the love affair between the Duke of Mantova and Angela Voglia.

After the death of Christina in 1689, she continued as a concert singer, performing in the private homes of the noble families of Rome, were the ban of women performers did not apply. She became the lover and singer of the Spanish ambassador, Luis Francisco de la Cerda, 9th Duke of Medinaceli. When Medinaceli was appointed Viceroy of Naples in 1696, she accompanied him there. She performed at the concerts of the vice regal court in Naples, but her position as the mistress of the Viceroy caused a scandal. She was referred to as the "Second Vicereine" or La seconda illustrissima viceregina and blamed for having a bad influence upon the affairs of state. In 1701, she accompanied Medinaceli to Spain. She was imprisoned in 1711 but released in 1714.
