= Giovanna De Grandis =

Italian poisoner (died 1569)

Giovanna De Grandis (died 5 July 1659, Rome) was a Roman poisoner. She was one of the central figures of the infamous Spana Prosecution, one of only six to be executed among over forty people to be implicated.

== Life ==
De Grandis was born in Rome. She was working as a laundress when she was recruited to the organization of Gironima Spana, a poison trafficker. De Grandis was an important member of the Spana organisation: she had direct contact with Spana and was one of the few of Spana's associates whom Spana entrusted the task to not only sell but also to manufacture poison. She and Spana herself manufactured the poison using arsenic acquired by the priest Don Girolamo, since apothecaries did not sell arsenic to women.

De Grandis was arrested in flagrante on 31 January 1659 and imprisoned in the Papal prison at Tor di Nona, where she was interrogated by the Papal authorities under lieutenant governor Stefano Bracchi. She confessed her guilt on 1 February, and started to name her accomplices and clients. Her testimony was essential to the Spana Prosecution. She personally reported the central figure Gironima Spana herself.

On 5 July 1659, Gironima Spana, Giovanna De Grandis, Maria Spinola, Graziosa Farina, and Laura Crispoldi were executed by hanging on Campo de' Fiori in Rome.
