= Giulia Tofana =

Italian historical figure associated with the poison "Aqua Tofana"

- Born: Unknown possibly Palermo, Sicily
- Died: 1651; Rome, Papal States
- Other name: Giulia Mangiardi
- Occupation: Apothecary or cosmetician (attributed)
- Known for: Association with "Aqua Tofana" in later accounts

Giulia Tofana (also spelt Toffana, Tophana, Tophania) (died in Rome, 1651) is a historical figure associated in later accounts with the poison known as Aqua Tofana. Modern scholarship disputes many details of her life, including her surname, origins, and any direct role in the 1659 prosecutions of the so-called Spana poison network in Rome.

== Biography ==
Information about Giulia Tofana's background is sparse. She was thought to have been born in Palermo. Speculation by historians that she may have taken the first name of her mother as her last name (a common practice at the time) led them to believe that she was the daughter of another Palermo poisoner, Thofania d’Adamo, but there is nothing to indicate that d'Adamo was the mother of Giulia. Thofania d’Adamo was accused of poisoning with an arsenic concoction called Aqua Tofana and executed on 12 July 1633. According to one version of events, Giulia Tofana fled to Rome and set up a poisoning ring that began to sell this poison to women who wanted to murder abusive or inconvenient spouses. This tale included 6 women in this poisoning ring active in the 1650s, including Girolama Spara, who took over after Giulia's death. Tofana's involvement in all of this is not confirmed. The only recorded evidence of poisoning activities was the executions of Thofania d'Adamo in 1633, and Girolama Spara in 1659 (claimed to be the daughter of Giulia Tofana).

Writer Craig A. Monson claims in his 2020 book The Black Widows of the Eternal City: The True Story of Rome’s Most Infamous poisoners that Giulia was from Coriglione not Palermo, had a married name of Giulia Mangiardi, and that her last name "Tofana", and the relationship with Thofania d’Adamo was an invention of an 1880s historian. Monson also found that after her husband's death, Giulia remarried in 1624 to the well-off real estate investor Cesare Ranchetti (1564–1654). Husband, wife, and their stepchildren moved to Rome in 1624 for unknown reasons (there were claims that Giulia was called up before the Holy Office of the Inquisition or that she poisoned and robbed a man from Genoa). They may have travelled to Rome to live with an uncle of one of their stepdaughters, a cleric named Andrea Lorestino.

=== Death ===
Historians point to Giulia Tofana dying in her sleep in 1651, with no one aware of any poisoning activities.

Confusion of her activities with other poisoners active in the area has led to tales that she died in 1659, or 1709, or 1730, with further elaboration that she took sanctuary in a convent and continued to manufacture and distribute poison for many years until she was found out, executed, and her body thrown over the wall of the church that had provided her with sanctuary.

== See also ==
- Catherine Deshayes Monvoisin
- Giovanna Bonanno
- Angel Makers of Nagyrév
- My Last Duchess, a poem by Robert Browning
