= Gironima Spana =

17th-century Italian poisoner

Gironima Spana (1615 – 5 July 1659) was a Sicilian poisoner and astrologer. She was the central figure in the infamous Spana Prosecution against a poisoning network of merchant women in Rome who distributed the poison Aqua Tofana to clients who wished to commit murder, in particular women who wished to become widows. She was executed alongside four women accomplices for having distributed poison to clients with the intent of murder. She has also been called Girolama Spara, Girolama Spala, L’ Astrologa, La Profetessa, and L'Indovina, but Gironima Spana was the spelling she herself used in court documents.

== Biography ==
=== Early life and origin ===
Spana was born in Sicily as the daughter of the wealthy Niccolo Spano, who was provisioning Spanish galleys and overseeing expenditures of Palermo's Ospedale degli Spagnol. She became the stepdaughter of Giulia Mangiardi (1581-1651), traditionally known in history as "Giulia Tofana" and recognized as the inventor of the poison Aqua Tofana or Aqua Toffanica, which she allegedly sold commercially in Palermo. The poison is traditionally claimed to have been named after Tofana's alleged mother Thofania d'Adamo, but there is nothing to indicate that d'Adamo was the mother of Giulia Mangiardi "Tofana".

After Gironima's father died, her stepmother remarried in 1624 to the well-off real estate investor Cesare Ranchetti (1564-1654).

=== Activity ===
In 1624, the family fled to her maternal uncle in Rome, the cleric and astrologer Andrea Lorestino (d. 1627).

Her stepfather Cesare Ranchetti was described as a spendthrift who ruined the family's fortune; Spana had to marry in 1629 at the age of fourteen, and her stepmother became a professional marriage maker but also, unofficially, allegedly resumed her business as a poison distributor in Rome. The family is known to have been established on the Via della Lungara in Rome in 1643. Spana was married to Niccolo Caiozzi (d. 1657), a Florentine grain speculator, who was described as an adulterous spendthrift, but he is not listed as living with her after 1640 and he is known to have left Rome in 1655 to escape his creditors.

Spana officially established herself as a professional astrologer and a distributor of herbal medicine. However, she was also instructed by her stepmother in how to manufacture and sell the Aqua Tofana poison. Together, the two women trafficked deadly poison and specialized in selling poison to women married to abusive husbands. Giulia Mangiardi was later described by contemporaries who met her in Rome as "a nasty, ugly woman" and "unpleasant and raggedy", but Gironima had a very good relationship with her stepmother, whom she described as "una brava donna" ('a good woman').

Historians point to her stepmother dying in her sleep in 1651 with no one aware of her poisoning activities. After her death 17 January 1651, Spana took over her business. She developed it into a considerable enterprise, with several poison saleswomen active in the business in the 1650s.

Spana was an astrologer of note in Rome, where she was engaged to predict the future and find missing objects by clients in the Roman aristocracy. It is noted that she behaved and dressed in a manner which made her acceptable in the salons of the aristocracy, and it is mentioned how her rich client sent for her in their carriages and that she often travelled around Rome in carriages borrowed from her aristocratic friends.

=== Prosecution ===
The poison business was exposed to the Papal authorities with the arrest of one of Spana's poison sellers, Giovanna De Grandis, who was arrested in flagrante 31 January 1659 and imprisoned at the Tor di Nona, where she named Spana during the interrogations.

On 2 February, Spana was arrested and taken to the Papal prison of Tor di Nona, where she was interrogated by the lieuntenant governor Stefano Bracchi. Spana was described as intelligent, self assured and confident. She denied all accusations and stood by her denial for months, despite repeated interrogations and confrontations with her former associates and clients. She was willing to answer questions and talked a lot, but only provided harmless information, such as long, detailed answers of acquaintances, their family history and residence, but never anything which could be seen as incriminating. She was described as much more resilient than her fellow prisoners; in contrast to them, she did not even talk about her guilt in her confession to a priest. Her lack of confession was a problem since law did not permit execution without it. She did not confess until 20 June. She finally signed a long statement of guilt. In regard to the poison, she stated: "I've given this liquid to more people than I’ve got hairs on my head".

The investigation, the Spana Prosecution, continued for several months until March 1660, involving about forty people accused of having sold or used the poison, with Spana and four of her female business associates, Giovanna De Grandis, Maria Spinola, Graziosa Farina, and Laura Crispoldi, executed at the Campo de' Fiori in Rome on 5 July 1659.

== Legacy ==
Gironima Spana and the Spana Prosecution became the subject of sensationalist myths, and she has been confused with her stepmother Giulia Tofana.

== In popular culture ==
Gironima Spana and the Spana Prosecution are the fictionalized focus of The Book of Secrets, a historical fiction novel by British author Anna Mazzola, published by Orion Fiction in March 2024.

== See also ==
- La Voisin
- Affair of the Poisons
