= Aqua Tofana =

Arsenic-based poison

Aqua Tofana (also known as Acqua Toffana and Aqua Tufania) was a strong, arsenic-based poison created in Sicily around 1630 that was reputedly widely used in Palermo, Naples, Perugia, and Rome, Italy, during the Renaissance.

The name Aqua Tofana has evolved to refer to a category of slow poisons that are deadly but largely undetectable, just as Aqua Tofana was. These slow poisons may have been used frequently through the nineteenth century. It has been associated with Giulia Tofana, or Tofania, a woman from Palermo, purportedly the leader of a ring of six poisoners in Rome, who sold Aqua Tofana to Italian women who wanted to kill their husbands.

== History ==
The first recorded mention of Aqua Tofana is from 1632–33 when it was used by two women, Francesca la Sarda and Teofania di Adamo, to poison their abusive husbands. It may have been invented by, and named after, Teofania. She was executed for her crimes, but several women associated with her, including Giulia Tofana (who may have been her daughter) and Gironima Spana, moved on to Rome and continued manufacturing and distributing the poison. Once in Rome, the women may have acquired the main ingredient, arsenic, from Father Girolamo of Sant'Agnese in Agone. Father Girolamo had access to this poison by way of his brother, who was an apothecary.

Women living during the Italian Renaissance desperately turned to Giulia Tofana, feeling that murder was their only way out of abusive marriages. They were regarded as property of the head of their household, either their father or husband, and thus, divorce was not an option at the time.

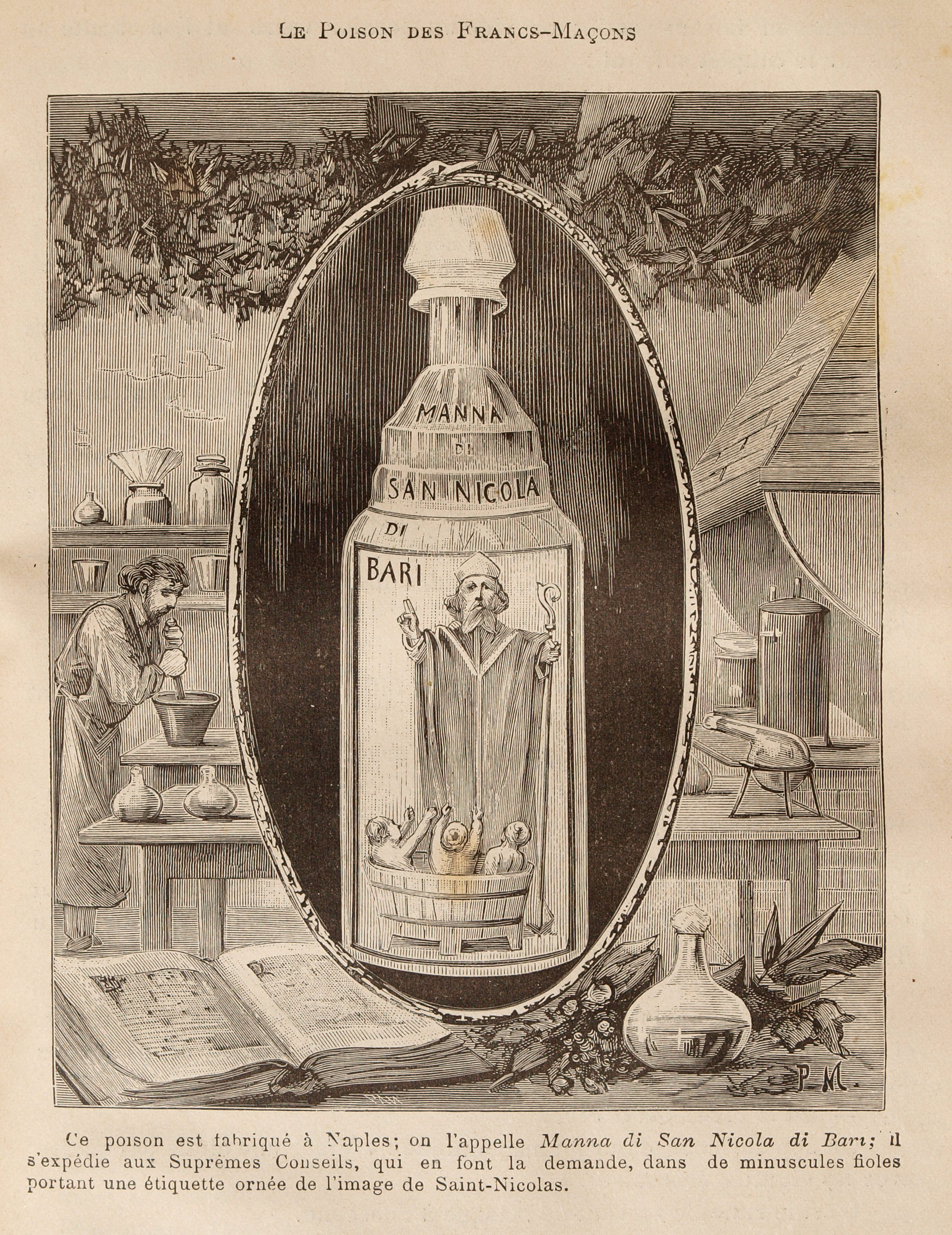
19th century engraving showing Poison "Manna di San Nicola" (Aqua Tofana), by Pierre Méjanel. This image is part of an anti-Masonry hoax.

Aqua Tofana was camouflaged in bottles labeled "Manna di San Nicola" ("Manna of St. Nicholas of Bari"), a marketing device intended to divert the authorities, giving the poison an appearance of cosmetic and a devotional object in vials that included a picture of St. Nicholas. Over 600 victims are alleged to have died from this poison, mostly husbands. The real Manna of Saint Nicholas is an innocent fluid still extracted from San Nicolas' bones in a church located in Bari, Italy.

Giulia Tofana died without being discovered; however, her accomplices were eventually caught and punished for their crimes. It is unclear how their schemes were revealed, however, there are a couple of theories. The first theory is that a client confessed to a priest that she had planned to kill her husband using Aqua Tofana, and in exchange for a police confession, was offered immunity. Others theorize that police may have caught a messenger who was distributing the poison and through that individual was able to get to the other women in this operation. In 1659, five of the women involved in the Aqua Tofana business were publicly hanged, while forty of their clients were imprisoned for life.

Between 1666 and 1676, the Marchioness de Brinvilliers used aqua tofana which was obtained through an Exili, an Italian fellow prison inmate of her lover, and subsequently to poison her father and two brothers, amongst others, and she was executed on 16 July 1676.

== Ingredients ==
The active ingredients of the mixture are known, but not how they were blended. Aqua Tofana contained mostly arsenic and lead, and possibly belladonna. Belladonna is a flower, which was commonly used in cosmetics at the time to enlarge pupils. It was a colorless, tasteless liquid and therefore easily mixed with water or wine to be served during meals. Its tasteless properties signify that it was made with a deliberate attempt to hide the potent metallic taste of arsenic.

== Symptoms ==
Poisoning by Aqua Tofana could go unnoticed and was so lethal it had the ability to kill its victims with just 4 drops. It is slow-acting, with symptoms resembling progressive disease or other natural causes, similar to the effects of arsenic poisoning. Those poisoned by Aqua Tofana reported several symptoms. The first small dosage would produce cold-like symptoms, escalating to flu-like symptoms by the second dose. The victim was very ill by the third dose; symptoms included vomiting, dehydration, diarrhea, and a burning sensation in the victim's throat and stomach. The fourth dose would kill the victim. As it was slow acting, it allowed victims time to prepare for their death, including writing a will and repenting. The antidote often given was vinegar and lemon juice.

== Legend about Mozart ==
The legend that Wolfgang Amadeus Mozart (1756–1791) was poisoned using Aqua Tofana is completely unsubstantiated, even though it was Mozart himself who started this rumor.

== Modern day social impacts ==
Almost 400 years later, Aqua Tofana is making a comeback as a key symbol in feminist discourse. Inspired by South Korea's feminist 4B movement, women in the United States have coined the slogan MATGA (Make Aqua Tofana Great Again), referencing both Donald Trump's slogan MAGA and Giulia Tofana's poison. This movement began out of concern that Trump's presidential victory puts reproductive rights at risk. It is also a direct retort to the misogynistic phrase "Your body, my choice" that was repeated after Trump's win.

Women participating in this social media trend have posted videos in which they pretend to make Aqua Tofana and add the fake concoction into men's drinks. One woman went viral for her video opening a piece of jewelry with a compartment, opening it to flash the camera with a devious smirk, captioning her video that American women would understand her reference to Aqua Tofana and that "they", meaning Donald Trump and his supporters, asked for this.
