= Campo de' Fiori =

Square in Rome, Italy

- City square
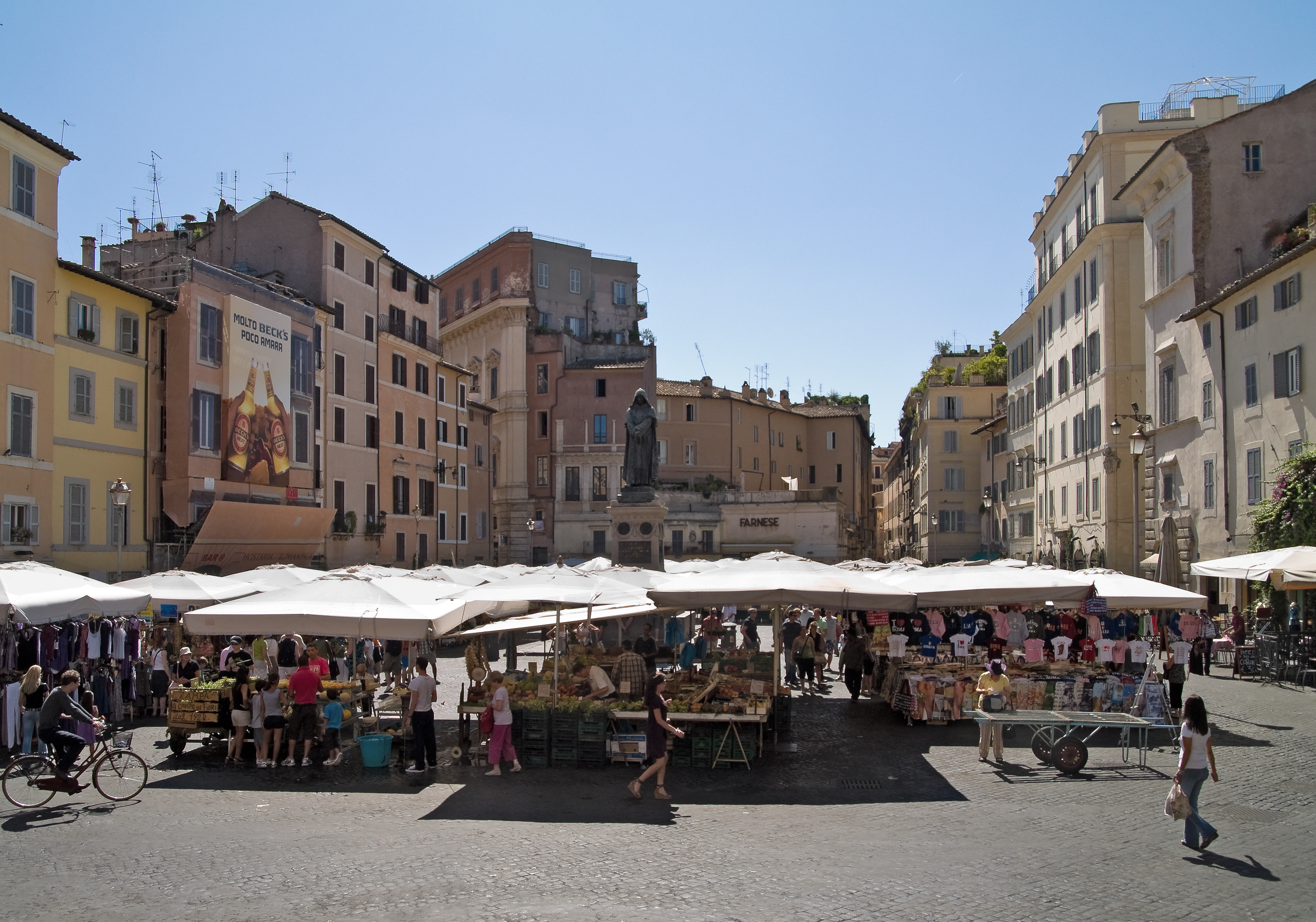
- The daily market with the statue of Giordano Bruno in the background
- Location: Rome, Italy
- Interactive map of Campo de' Fiori
- Coordinates: 41°53′45″N 12°28′19″E

Campo de' Fiori (Italian: [ˈkampo de ˈfjoːri], lit. 'Field of Flowers') is a rectangular square south of Piazza Navona in Rome, Italy, at the border between the rioni Parione and Regola. It is diagonally southeast of the Palazzo della Cancelleria and one block northeast of the Palazzo Farnese. The name dates to the Middle Ages when the area was a meadow.

== History ==
Campo de' Fiori in the 1740s, etching by Giuseppe Vasi

In ancient Rome, the area was unused space between Pompey's Theatre and the flood-prone Tiber. Though the Orsini established themselves on the south flank of the space in the 13th century, until the 15th century, the square remained undeveloped. The first church in the immediate vicinity was built during the pontificate of Boniface IX (1389–1404), Santa Brigida a Campo de' Fiori; with the building-up of the rione, the church has now come to face that part of the former square that is now Piazza Farnese. In 1456, under Pope Callixtus III, Ludovico Cardinal Trevisani paved the area as part of a large project to improve rione Parione. This renewal was both the result and cause of several important buildings being built in the surroundings; in particular, the Orsini palace on Campo de' Fiori was rebuilt. The Renaissance Palazzo della Cancelleria can be seen in Vasi's etching, rising majestically beyond the far right corner of the square.

== Trade ==
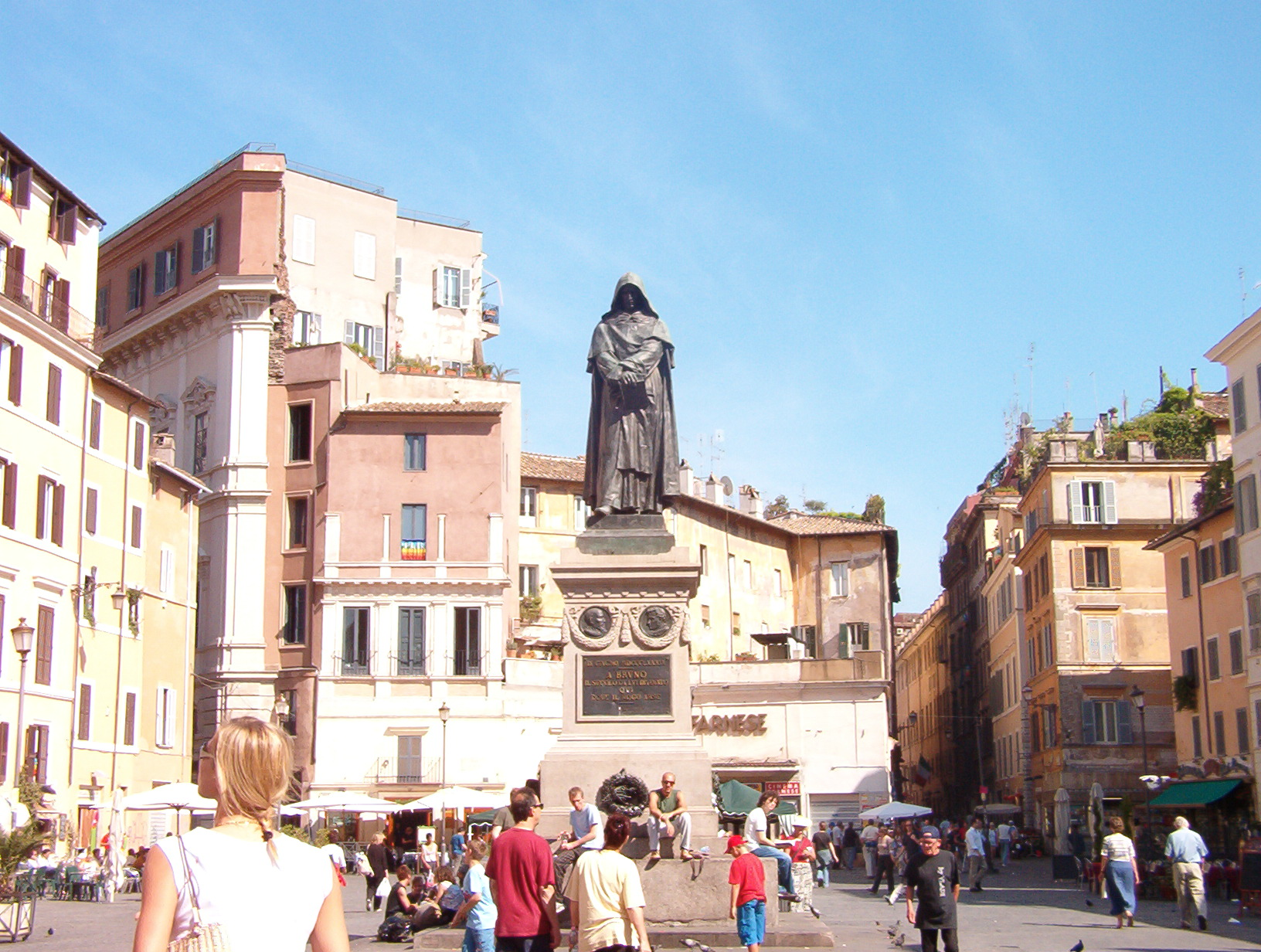
The monument to the philosopher Giordano Bruno at the centre of the square

Campo de' Fiori has never been architecturally formalized. The square has always remained a focus for commercial and street culture: the surrounding streets are named for trades—Via dei Balestrari (crossbow-makers), Via dei Baullari (coffer-makers), Via dei Cappellari (hat-makers), Via dei Chiavari (key-makers) and Via dei Giubbonari (tailors). With new access streets installed by Sixtus IV— Via Florea and Via Pellegrino— the square became a part of the Via papale ("Pope's road"), the street linking Basilica of St. John Lateran and the Vatican and traversed by the Pope after his election during the so-called "Cavalcata del possesso", when he reached the Lateran from the Vatican to take possession of the city. This urban development brought wealth to the area: A flourishing horse market took place twice a week (Monday and Saturday) and many inns, hotels and shops came to be situated in Campo de' Fiori. The most famous of them, the Taverna della Vacca ("cow's Inn") still stands at the southwest corner of the square, at the beginning of Via de' Cappellari. It belonged to Vannozza dei Cattanei, the most famous lover of Alexander VI Borgia, whose family seal is still on display on the house facade.

== Executions ==
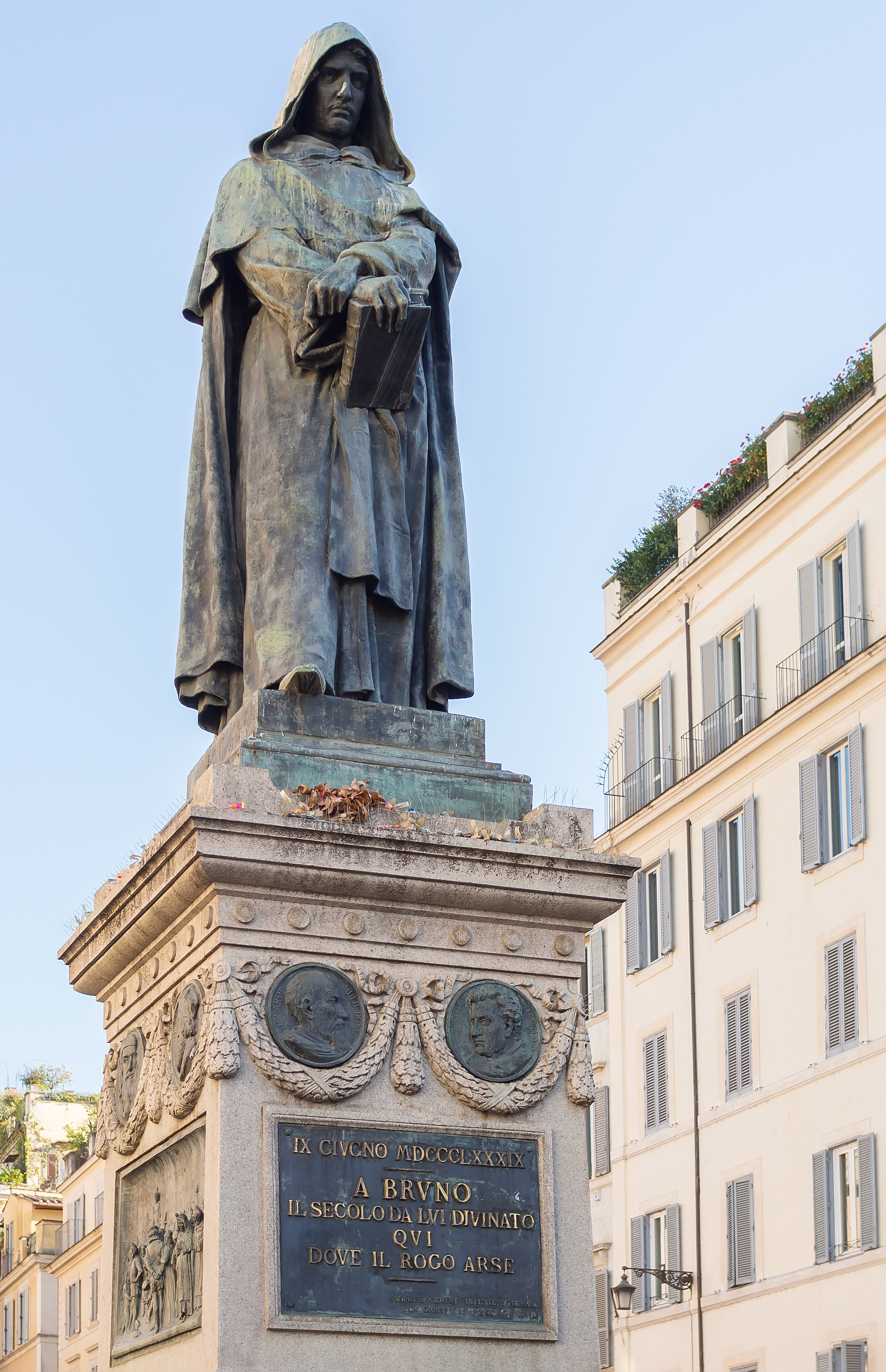
A close-up of the statue of Giordano Bruno

Executions used to be held publicly in Campo de' Fiori. Here, on 17 February 1600, the philosopher Giordano Bruno was burnt alive for heresy, and all of his works were placed on the Index of Forbidden Books by the Holy Office. In 1889, Ettore Ferrari dedicated a monument to him on the exact spot of his death: He stands defiantly facing the Vatican and was regarded in the first days of a reunited Italy as a martyr to freedom of thought. The inscription on the base reads: A BRUNO – IL SECOLO DA LUI DIVINATO – QUI DOVE IL ROGO ARSE ("To Bruno – the century predicted by him – here where the fire burned"). The body of theologian and scientist Marco Antonio de Dominis was also burned in this square in 1624. The condemned women poisoners of the infamous Spana Prosecution, including the central figure Gironima Spana herself, were executed here in 1659–1660.

In addition to people, the Holy Office burned the Talmud following the Bragadin-Giustiniani dispute in Campo de' Fiori on 9 September 1553, the first day of the Jewish new year holiday, Rosh Hashanah. A plaque commemorating this incident was affixed to the marketplace street in Campo de' Fiori in 2011 (the idea of memorializing this event was inspired by the monument to Giordano Bruno). The plaque quotes a Talmudic description of the martyrdom of Rabbi Hananiah ben Teradion, who was burned alive wrapped in a Torah scroll; it also quotes "Sha'ali Serufah ba-Esh", a lamentation poem by Meir of Rothenburg written after seeing wagon-loads of Talmudic manuscripts burned in Paris in 1242.

The demolition of a block of housing in 1858 enlarged Campo de' Fiori, and since 1869, a daily vegetable and fish market that was previously held in Piazza Navona has been held there. The ancient cattle fountain known as la Terrina (the "soupbowl") was resited in 1889 and replaced with a copy that now is used to keep cut flowers fresh. Its inscription: FA DEL BENE E LASSA DIRE ("Do good and let them talk") suits the gossipy nature of the marketplace. In the afternoons, local games of football give way to set-ups for outdoor cafés.

At night, Campo de' Fiori is a meeting place for tourists and young people coming from all parts of the city. After 2000, it was sometimes a dangerous nighttime place in the city due to assaults and affrays by drunk tourists and football supporters.

Preceded by Appian Way	Landmarks of Rome; Campo de' Fiori	Succeeded by Clivus Capitolinus
