= Tor di Nona =

Neighborhood in Rome

Coordinates: 41°54′05″N 12°28′04″E

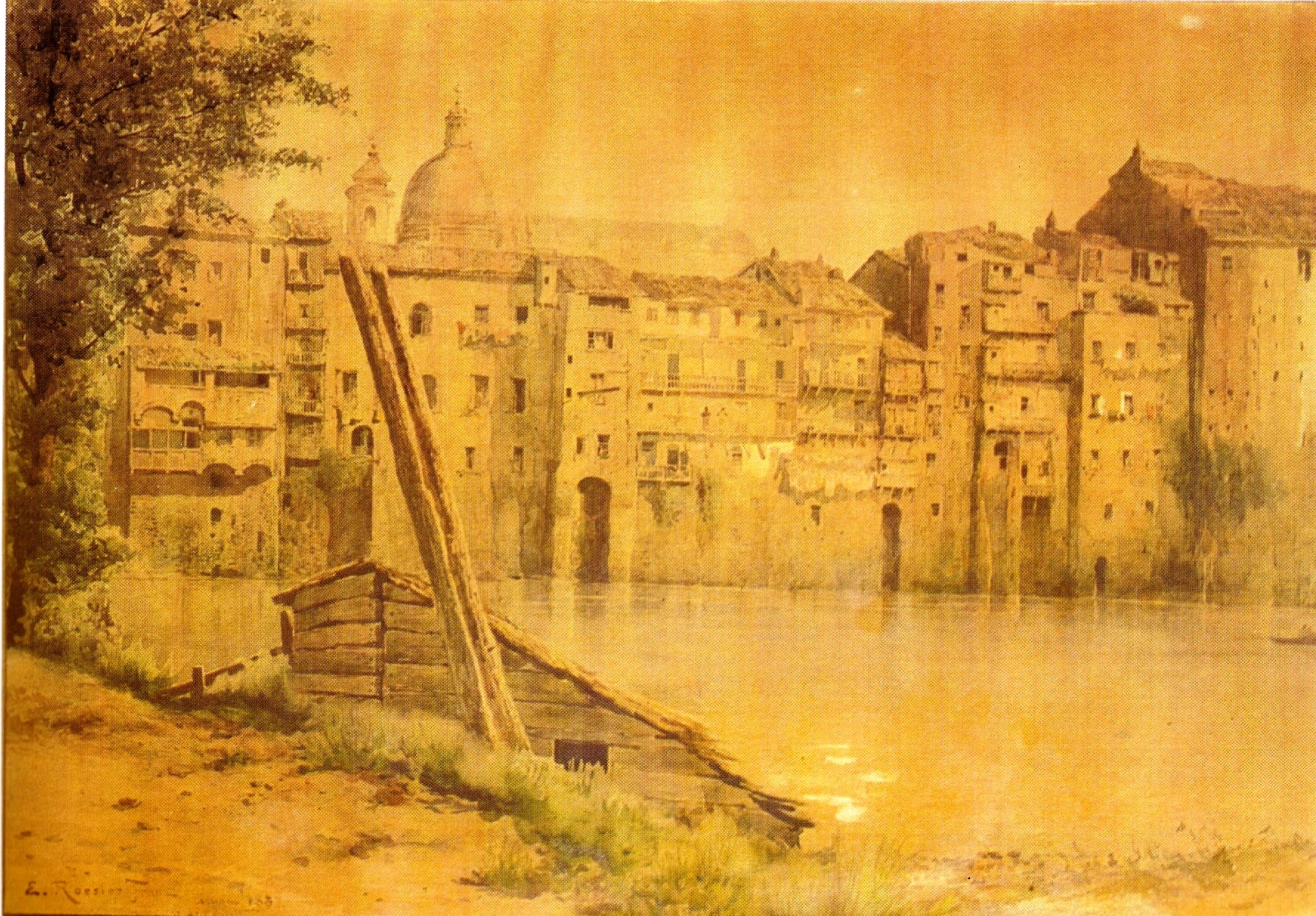
Houses in Tor di Nona c. 1880, watercolour by Ettore Roesler Franz

The Tor di Nona is a neighborhood in Rome's rione Ponte. It lies in the heart of the city's historic center, between the Via dei Coronari and the Tiber River. Its name commemorates the Torre dell'Annona, a mediaeval tower which once stood there and was later converted into one of the city's most important theatres, the Teatro Tordinona, later called the Teatro Apollo.

== History ==
=== Early history ===
The Torre dell'Annona was a medieval stronghold of the Orsini family and from the early 15th century acted as a pontifical prison. Prisoners included Benevenuto Cellini who experienced the dungeon's lightless cells, one of which was known as "the pit", Beatrice Cenci, and Giordano Bruno who was imprisoned here before being burned alive in Campo de' Fiori. In 1659-1660, it was used during the infamous Spana Prosecution.

=== Theatre ===
When the New Prison (Le Carceri Nuove) was built in Via Giulia, Tor di Nona was rebuilt in 1667 as a theatre patronized by Queen Christina of Sweden and the best Roman company. In January 1671 Rome's first public theatre opened in the former jail.

The Teatro Tordinona was inaugurated in January 1671 with the opera Scipione affricano by Francesco Cavalli, with Antonia Coresi as Scipione and Medea, and Angelica Quadrelli as Sofonisba and Isifile.

For the opening Scipione affricano was performed; also operas by Antonio Sartorio, Giovanni Antonio Boretto and Giovanni Maria Pagliardi. Filippo Acciaiuoli was the first director. The new pope Clement X worried about the influence of theatre on public morals. When Innocent XI became pope, things turned even worse; he made Christina's theatre into a storeroom for grain, although he had been a frequent guest in her royal box with the other cardinals. He forbade women to perform with song or acting, and the wearing of decolleté dresses. Christina considered this sheer nonsense, and let women perform in her palace.

There are many perhaps unexecuted drawings for it by Carlo Fontana, bound in an album which passed into the hands of Scottish architect Robert Adam, now at Sir John Soane's Museum, London (Concise Catalogue). The theater suffered the fires and rebuildings that theaters are prone to, and was finally swept away when the embankments of the Tiber (lungoteveri) were built in 1888; this section was named Lungotevere Tor di Nona.

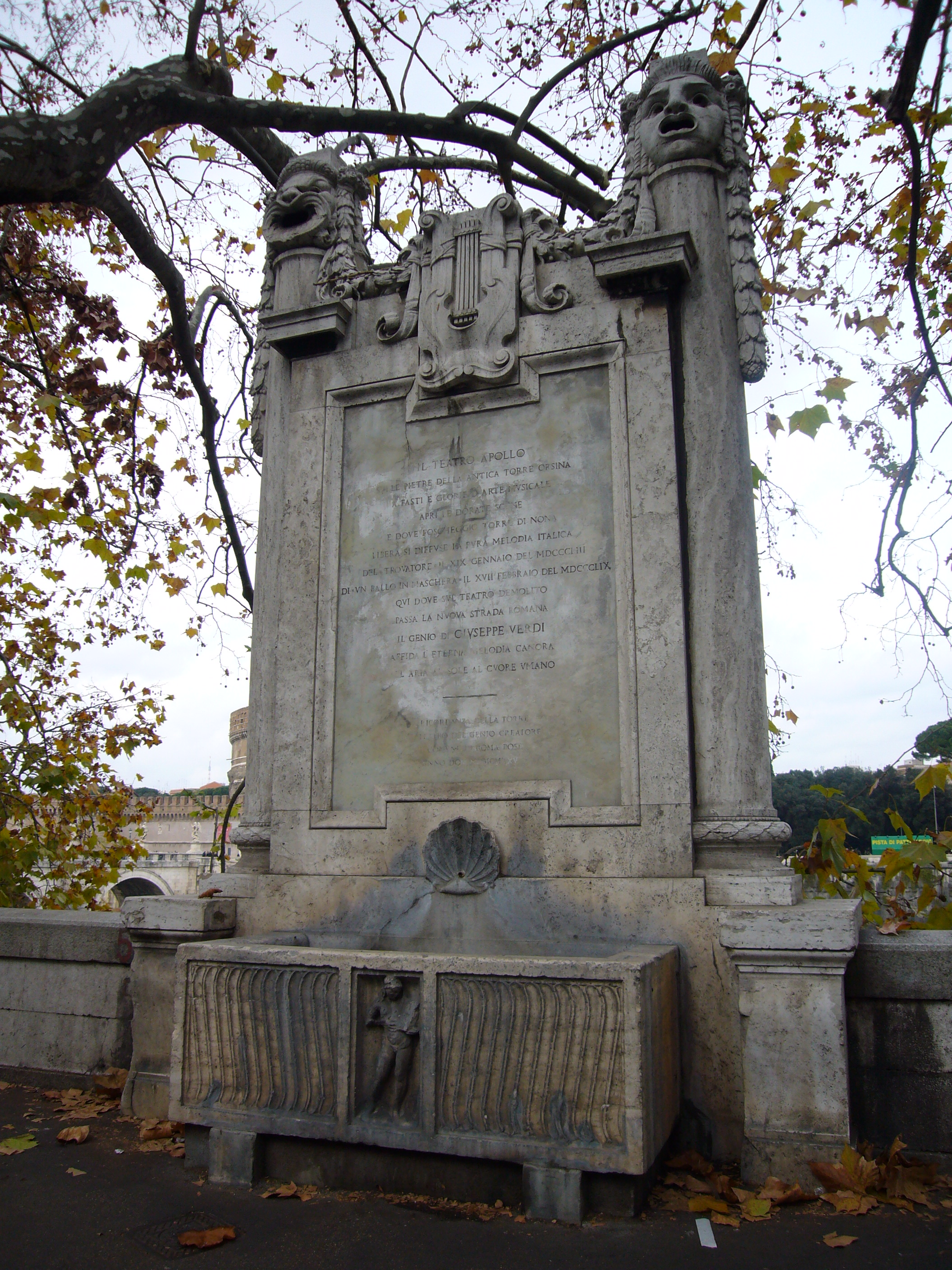
Memorial to the Teatro Apollo

A free-standing white marble fountain (1925) memorializes the theater in its late-18th century transformation as the Teatro Apollo, with suitable theatrical masks, and a small trickle of water into a massive sarcophagus, in the somewhat theatrical classical style of Vittorio Emmanuele III and Benito Mussolini. As the Teatro Apollo, the largest lyric theater of Rome, the site witnessed the world premieres of two operas of Giuseppe Verdi, Il Trovatore and Un Ballo in Maschera.

Now nothing is left of the original tower nor of the theatre but their name, although in the early 1930s a smaller theatre bearing the name Teatro Tordinona was built on the Via degli Acquasparta, near the original site. It remains a going concern, presenting works by Luigi Pirandello and contemporary theater.

=== Later history ===
At the end of the 19th century, the neighborhood was partially destroyed because of the construction of the Lungotevere, the alleys bordering the river. The whole north side of the street was pulled down, including buildings like the Teatro Apollo and the palazzo del Cardinale di Parma. Another blow came in the 1910s with the construction of via Zanardelli, which cut the thousand-year link with Via di Monte Brianzo. This accelerated the decay of the quarter, which in the 1940s became part of a development plan as part of the fascist demolition strategy in Rome. As in Borgo and Via Giulia, this work was halted by World War II. During the last years of World War II, the Roman "mercato nero" (black market) was located in the Tor di Nona quarter. In the postwar years, although the population had already left the quarter, a strong press campaign led by journalists like Antonio Cederna and intellectuals like Italo Insolera and Giulio Carlo Argan saved Tor di Nona from destruction. From that time until the present, the centre of Rome has been protected against further destruction.
