= 1656 =

1656 in various calendars
- Gregorian calendar: 1656; MDCLVI
- Ab urbe condita: 2409
- Armenian calendar: 1105; ԹՎ ՌՃԵ
- Assyrian calendar: 6406
- Balinese saka calendar: 1577–1578
- Bengali calendar: 1062–1063
- Berber calendar: 2606
- English Regnal year: 7 Cha. 2 – 8 Cha. 2 (Interregnum)
- Buddhist calendar: 2200
- Burmese calendar: 1018
- Byzantine calendar: 7164–7165
- Chinese calendar: 乙未年 (Wood Goat); 4353 or 4146 — to — 丙申年 (Fire Monkey); 4354 or 4147
- Coptic calendar: 1372–1373
- Discordian calendar: 2822
- Ethiopian calendar: 1648–1649
- Hebrew calendar: 5416–5417
- Hindu calendars
- Vikram Samvat: 1712–1713
- Shaka Samvat: 1577–1578
- Kali Yuga: 4756–4757
- Holocene calendar: 11656
- Igbo calendar: 656–657
- Iranian calendar: 1034–1035
- Islamic calendar: 1066–1067
- Japanese calendar: Meireki 2 (明暦２年)
- Javanese calendar: 1578–1579
- Julian calendar: Gregorian minus 10 days
- Korean calendar: 3989
- Minguo calendar: 256 before ROC 民前256年
- Nanakshahi calendar: 188
- Thai solar calendar: 2198–2199
- Tibetan calendar: ཤིང་མོ་ལུག་ལོ་ (female Wood-Sheep); 1782 or 1401 or 629 — to — མེ་ཕོ་སྤྲེ་ལོ་ (male Fire-Monkey); 1783 or 1402 or 630

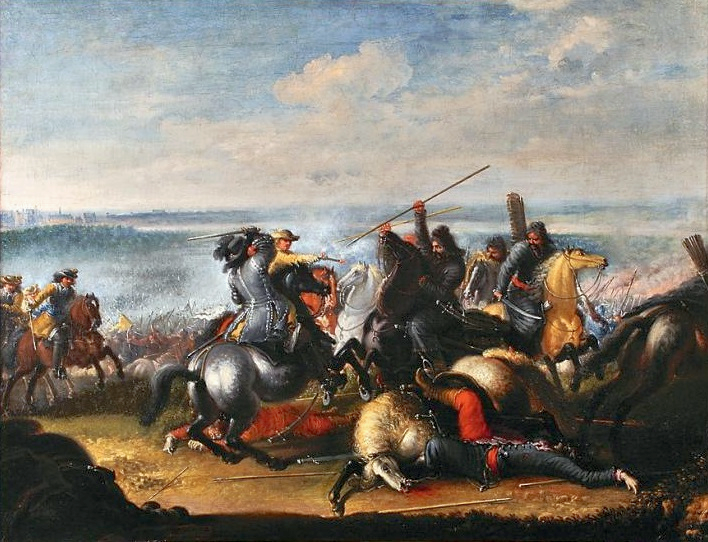
July 30: Sweden recaptures the Polish capital of Warsaw

1656 (MDCLVI) was a leap year starting on Saturday of the Gregorian calendar and a leap year starting on Tuesday of the Julian calendar, the 1656th year of the Common Era (CE) and Anno Domini (AD) designations, the 656th year of the 2nd millennium, the 56th year of the 17th century, and the 7th year of the 1650s decade. As of the start of 1656, the Gregorian calendar was 10 days ahead of the Julian calendar, which remained in localized use until 1923.

== Events ==
=== January–March ===
- January 5 – The First War of Villmergen, a civil war in the Confederation of Switzerland pitting its Protestant and Roman Catholic cantons against each other, breaks out but is resolved by March 7. The Lutheran cantons of the larger cities of Zurich, Bern and Schaffhausen battle against seven Catholic cantons of Lucerne, Schwyz, Uri, Zug, Baden Unterwalden (now Obwalden and Nidwalden) and St. Gallen.
- January 17 – The Treaty of Königsberg is signed, establishing an alliance between Charles X Gustav of Sweden and Frederick William, Elector of Brandenburg.
- January 24 – The first Jewish doctor in the Thirteen Colonies of America, Jacob Lumbrozo, arrives in Maryland.
- January 20 – Reinforced by soldiers dispatched by the Viceroy of Peru, Spanish Chilean troops defeat the indigenous Mapuche warriors in a battle at San Fabián de Conuco in what is now central Chile, turning the tide in the Spanish colonists favor in the Mapuche uprising after more than a year.
- February 18 (February 8 O.S.) – Battle of Golab: Swedish Empire troops led by King Carl X Gustav defeat troops of the Polish–Lithuanian Commonwealth commanded by General Stefan Czarniecki in the first major engagement of the Swedish Deluge.
- February 23 – London's Lord Mayor Christopher Packe suggests to Oliver Cromwell, the Lord Protector and chief executive of the Commonwealth of England, Scotland and Ireland, that the monarchy should be restored with Cromwell as its King. Cromwell declines to become King Oliver, but his right to name his successor becomes effective on May 25, 1657 with the commencement of the Humble Petition and Advice.
- February 26 – A rebellion of Turkish soldiers, leading to the "Çınar incident", takes place after a palace guard for Ottoman Sultan Mehmet IV turns away a representative group who had come for payment for their services during the war in Crete. The rebellion ends with the mass killing 30 men identified by the rebels as being responsible for the non-payment.
- March 3 – Fyodor Baykov, the Russian Empire's first envoy to China, is admitted to the Forbidden City within Beijing, after being sent by Tsar Alexis to negotiate a trade agreement with the Emperor Shunzi.
- March 4 – The "Çınar incident", named for the Turkish word for the sycamore tree takes place after Ottoman Sultan Mehmet IV declines the request of soldiers to have 30 named government officials put to death. When Mehmet agrees only to dismiss the people from office, the rebels seek out the men on the list and publicly hang most of them from the cinar trees.
- March 5 – Zurnazen Mustafa Pasha is appointed as the Grand Vizier of the Ottoman Empire after persuading Mehmet IV to rescind the February 28 selection of Gazi Hüseyin Pasha. Zurnazen Mustafa's rule lasts only four hours and he is sent into exile the same day.
- March 7 – The First War of Villmergen in the Confederation of Switzerland ends with a peace agreement, mediated by France and the Duchy of Savoy, between the Protestant and Roman Catholic cantons.
- March 15 – Battle of Jaroslaw: Almost a month after their defeat by Sweden at the Battle of Golab, Polish and Lithuanian troops commanded by Stefan Czarniecki defeat King Karl X Gustav's Swedish Army.
- March 23 – Roman Catholic Pope Alexander VII issues a decree ending the Chinese Rites controversy between Jesuit missionaries (who tolerate the rites as compatible with Catholicism) and Dominican and Franciscan missionaries (who consider the Chinese rituals incompatible). The Pope rules that practices ""favorable to Chinese customs", including Confucianism and ancestor worship, can be accepted as compatible with Catholic rites.

=== April–June ===
- April 1 – John II Casimir Vasa, King of Poland, crowns the Black Madonna of Częstochowa as Queen and Protector of Poland in the cathedral of Lwów, after the miraculous saving of the Jasna Góra Monastery during the Deluge, an event which changed the course of the Second Northern War. The King swears a vow, the Lwów Oath, pledging to protect Poland's people from being conquered again.
- April 2 – The Treaty of Brussels is signed, creating an alliance between Philip IV of Spain and the exiled Royalists of the British Isles, led by Charles II.
- April 28 – The Dutch East India Company ship Vergulde Draeck, with 193 crew aboard and a valuable cargo is wrecked off Ledge Point, Western Australia, with the loss of 118 members. Another 75 make it to shore, with limited provisions. The ship had been bound from the Cape of Good Hope to Batavia in the Dutch East Indies (now Jakarta in Indonesia).
- May 7 – Nine days after the wreck of the Vergulde Draeck, a steersman and six crew members are dispatched to Batavia to get help. The other 68 survivors remain at Ledge Point and await rescue but are not seen again.
- May 12 – The Dutch capture the city of Colombo, Sri Lanka, marking the start of Netherlands colonial rule of Dutch Ceylon.
- May 17 – In elections by the nobility of Venice for the Leader of the Venetian Republic, Francesco Cornaro defeats Bertuccio Valier. Cornaro dies less than three weeks later, on June 5.
- June 15 – Bertuccio Valier is elected as the new Doge of the Venetian Republic in Venice.
- June 16 – After a 41-day voyage, the seven-member team dispatched from the Vergulde Draeck reaches Batavia and alerts Dutch East India Company officials that the ship was wrecked on April 28. Two rescue ships, the Goede Hoop and the Witte Valck are sent to rescue the men marooned in Western Australia. By the time the Goede Hoop arrives, the crew find no sign of the wreckage of the Vergulde Draeck.
- June 21 – Poland's capital, Warsaw, is recaptured by Poland's John II Casimir Vasa 11 months after the capital had fallen on July 25, 1655 to Sweden.
- June 27 – The Navy of the Ottoman Empire suffers a major defeat after two days of fighting against the navies of the Republic of Venice and of Malta in the Battle of the Dardanelles, one of the Turkish straits that connects the Black Sea to the Mediterranean Sea. Out of 98 Ottoman Turkish ships under the command of Kenan Pasha, 82 are either captured or destroyed. Venice loses only three of its ships, but its commander, Admiral Lorenzo Marcello, is killed by a direct cannon hit to his flagship.
- June 29 – The Treaty of Marienburg is signed by representatives of Sweden and of Brandenburg and Prussia to create a military alliance during the Second Northern War. King Karl X Gustav signs for Sweden and the Elector Friedrich Wilhelm signs for Brandenburg and Prussia.

=== July–September ===
- July 18 – In an attempt to find survivors of the Vergulde Draeck, a search party is sent ashore by the rescue ship Goede Hoop; eleven men from two search parties while in the forests around the wreckage site. No trace of the Vergulde Draeck will be found for more than three centuries, until its wreckage is discovered by skin divers on April 13, 1963.
- July 27 – A Writ of Excommunication is issued against Baruch Spinoza.
- July 30 – After a battle of three days, Swedish and Brandenburger troops led by King Charles X Gustav of Sweden, defeat the forces of the Polish–Lithuanian Commonwealth, near Warsaw and recapture the recently liberated capital.
- August 8 – In the Ayutthaya Kingdom, comprising most of the territory now occupied by Thailand, King Prasat Thong dies after a reign of more than 25 years. His eldest son, Prince Chao Fa Chai, is crowned as King Sanpet VI but Prasat's brother plots the new king's overthrow.
- August 9 – King Sanpet's uncle, Prince Si Suthammaracha, stages a coup d'etat and becomes the new King of Ayutthaya, now Thailand. Suthammaracha appoints another nephew, Prince Narai, as his chief minister and former King Sanpet is executed two days later on August 11. Suthammaracha's reign lasts less than three months.
- August 14 – In one of the first battles of the Russo-Swedish War, Russian troops capture the Swedish-controlled city of Kokenhusen in Swedish Livonia (Latvia). Tsar Alexis, ruler of the Russian Empire and the leader of the Russian troops in battle, renames Kokenhausen "Tsarevich-Dmitriev" in honor of his late first-born son. Russia holds the city for more than 30 years before it is ceded back to Sweden. Kokenhusen is now the Latvian town of Koknese.
- August 27 – The Treaty of Butre is signed in West Africa by representatives of the Dutch West India Company and of the Ahanta Kingdom and allows the Netherlands to have a protectorate over the Dutch Gold Coast. The area is now part of the Republic of Ghana.
- September 15 – Köprülü Mehmed Pasha becomes Grand Vizier of the Ottoman Empire.

=== October–December ===
- October 26 – King Si Suthammaracha of Ayutthaya (now Thailand) is overthrown in a coup d'etat by his nephew and former ally, Prince Narai, 11 weeks after having staged a coup to seize the throne. Narai is crowned as King Ramathibodi III.
- November 3 – The Truce of Vilna is signed between Russia and the Polish–Lithuanian Commonwealth. In addition to agreeing to a temporary ceasefire in their ongoing war, Tsar Alexis of Russia agrees to help defend the commonwealth against Sweden's invasion in return for Tsar Alexis being named heir to the thrones of Poland and Lithuania by King John II Casimir Vasa.
- November 4 – Ali Adil Shah II becomes the new Sultan of Bijapur (located in what is now India's Karnataka state) upon the death of his father, Mohammed Adil Shah.
- November 6 – At the age of 13, Prince Afonso, Duke of Braganza becomes the new King of Portugal upon the death of his father, King João IV. Because of his age and a mental disability King Afonso VI's authority is exercised instead by his mother, Queen Luisa, as Regent.
- November 20 – The Treaty of Labiau is signed, between Charles X Gustav of Sweden and Frederick William, Elector of Brandenburg.
- December 1 – A treaty of alliance is signed between the Holy Roman Empire and the Polish–Lithuanian Commonwealth.
- December 6 – The Treaty of Radnot is signed between Sweden, the Electorate of Brandenburg, Transylvania (now Romania), and two rebels groups within Poland on how to divide the Polish–Lithuanian Commonwealth in the event of a victory in the Second Northern War.
- December 16 – English Quaker James Nayler is convicted of blasphemy but spared the death penalty.
- December 17 – King Frederick III of Denmark and Norway decrees that loan repayments and payments of interest to lenders will be made on two specific days, May 29 and June 11, each one nicknamed the Fandens fødselsdag or "Devil's Birthday",
- December 25 – The pendulum clock is invented by Christiaan Huygens, so accurate that it only loses 10 seconds per day. Huygens will mention the date in a letter to Ismail Boulliau a year later.

=== Undated ===
- The Stockholm Banco, the first bank to issue banknotes, is founded in Stockholm, Sweden.
- The only English fifty shilling coin is minted.
- Konoike Zen'amon (son of Konoike Shinroku) founds a baking and money-changing business in Osaka, Japan.
- Adams' Grammar School at Newport, Shropshire, England is founded by William Adams.
- Physician Samuel Stockhausen of the metal mining town of Goslar, Lower Saxony publishes his Libellus de lithargyrii fumo noxio morbifico, ejusque metallico frequentiori morbo vulgò dicto die Hütten Katze oder Hütten Rauch ("Treatise on the Noxious Fumes of Litharge, Diseases caused by them and Miners' Asthma"), a pioneering study of occupational disease.

== Births ==
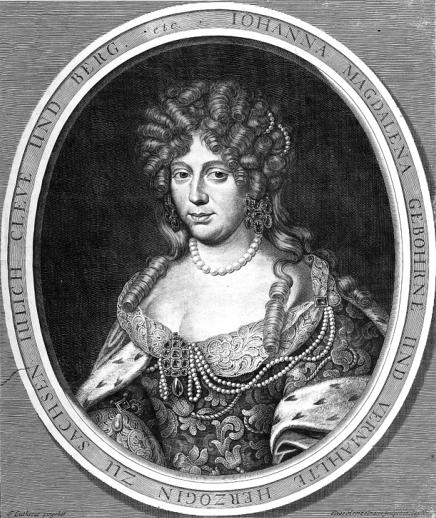
Duchess Johanna Magdalena of Saxe-Altenburg

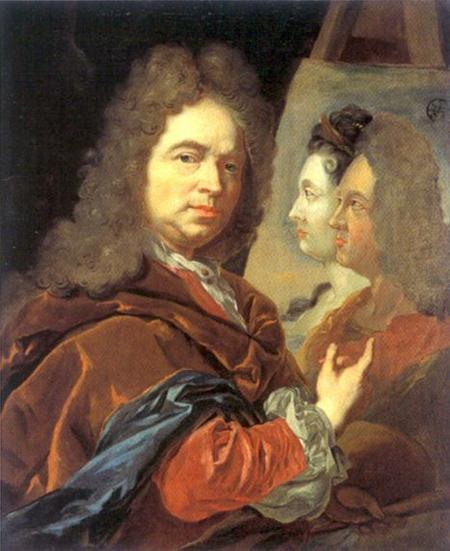
Jan Frans van Douven

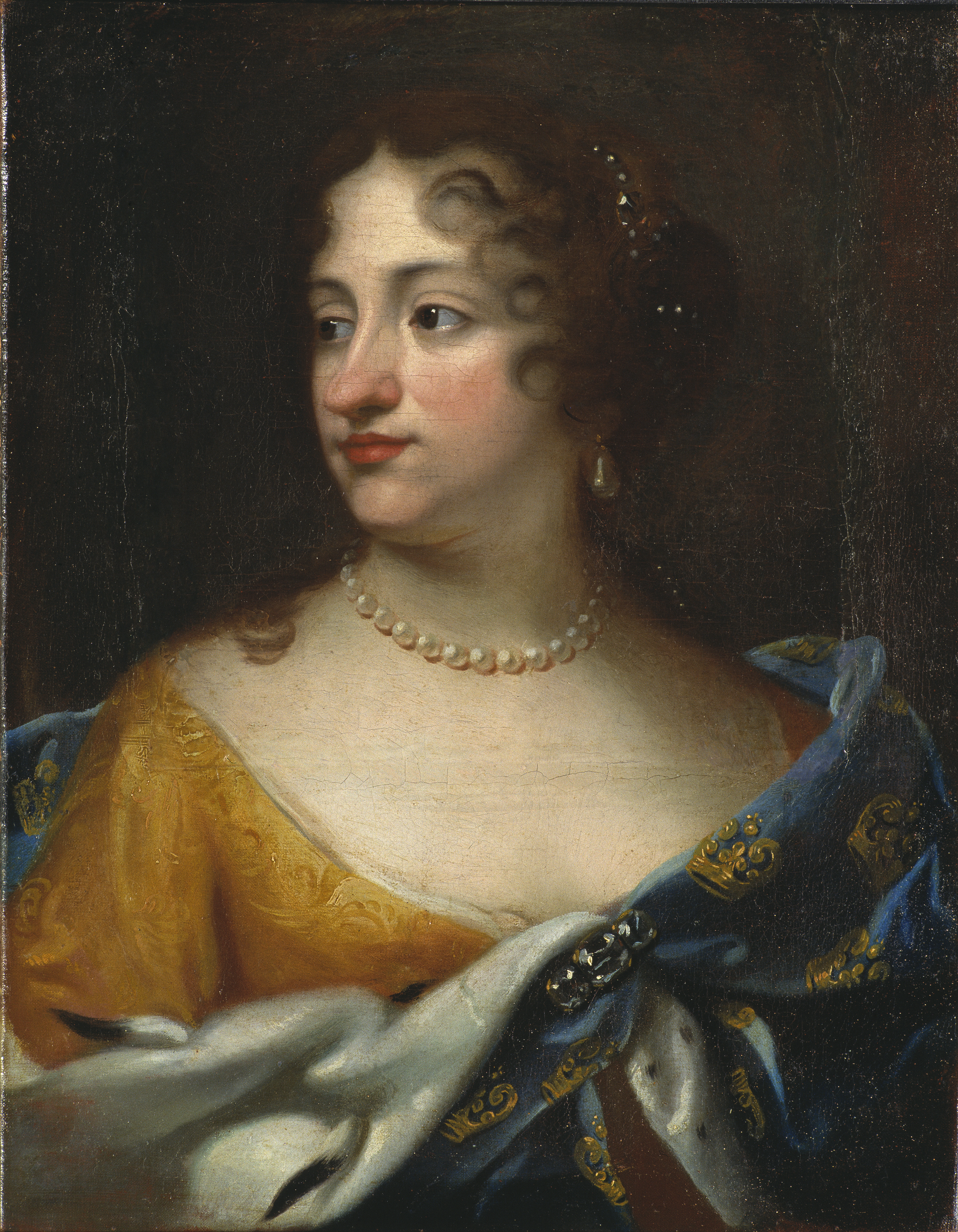
Ulrika Eleonora of Denmark

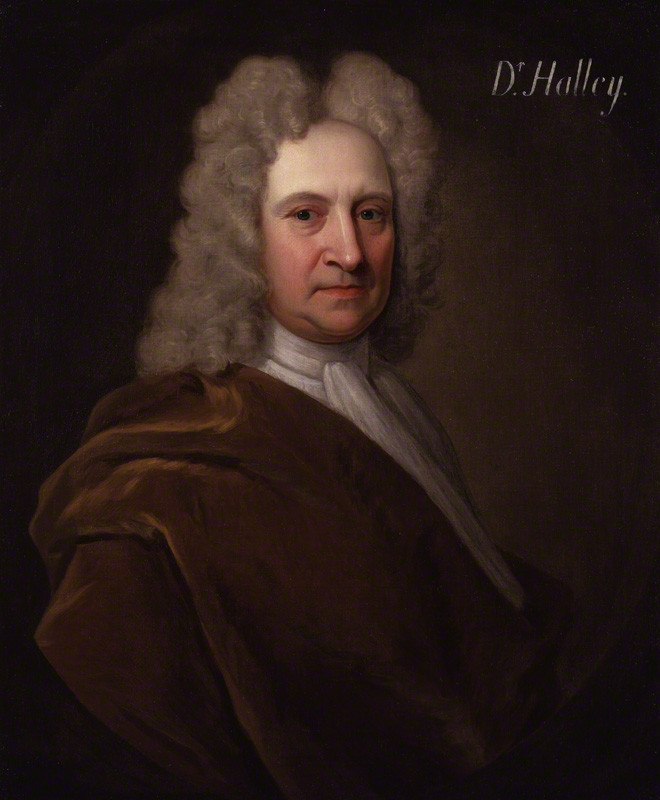
Edmond Halley

- January 1 – William Fleetwood, Anglican bishop (d. 1723)
- January 2 – Paolo Panelli, Italian painter (d. 1759)
- January 14 – Duchess Johanna Magdalena of Saxe-Altenburg (d. 1686)
- January 15 – John Ashburnham, 1st Baron Ashburnham, English politician (d. 1710)
- January 29 – Samuel Andrew, American Congregational clergyman and educator (d. 1738)
- February 2 – Charles Churchill, English Army general and politician (d. 1714)
- February 9 – Rose Venerini, Italian saint, educational pioneer (d. 1728)
- February 10 – Ferdinand de Marsin, Marshal of France (d. 1706)
- February 16 – Anthony Cary, 5th Viscount of Falkland, English politician (d. 1694)
- March 1 – Maria Angela Caterina d'Este, Italian princess (d. 1722)
- March 2 – Jan Frans van Douven, Dutch painter (d. 1727)
- March 11 – Duchess Marie Elisabeth of Hesse-Darmstadt (d. 1715)
- March 13 – Hachisuka Tsunamichi, Japanese daimyō, ruler of the Tokushima Domain (d. 1678)
- March 26 – Nicolaas Hartsoeker, Dutch mathematician and physicist (d. 1725)
- March 30 – Nicolas de Largillière, French painter (d. 1746)
- March 31
  - Giovanni Batista Bussi, Italian Catholic cardinal (d. 1726)
  - Juan Andrés de Ustariz, Royal Governor of Cuba (d. 1718)
- April 17 – William Molyneux, Irish politician, philosopher and writer (d. 1698)
- April 9 – Francesco Trevisani, Italian painter (d. 1746)
- April 10 – René Lepage de Sainte-Claire, lord-founder of Rimouski in eastern Quebec, Canada (d. 1718)
- April 12 – Benoît de Maillet, French diplomat and natural historian (d. 1738)
- April 23 – Anton Egon, Prince of Fürstenberg-Heiligenberg, Governor of the Electorate of Saxony (d. 1716)
- May 2 – Sir Richard Levinge, 1st Baronet, Anglo-Irish politician and judge (d. 1724)
- May 4 – John Louis I, Prince of Anhalt-Dornburg (d. 1704)
- May 8 – Sir John Mainwaring, 2nd Baronet, English member of Parliament (d. 1702)
- May 23 – Rebecca Rawson, Massachusetts heroine of the 1849 book Leaves from Margaret Smith's Journal (d. 1692)
- May 28 – Anton Florian, Prince of Liechtenstein (d. 1721)
- May 31 – Marin Marais, French composer and viol player (d. 1728)
- June 5 – Joseph Pitton de Tournefort, French botanist (d. 1708)
- June 17 – Paul Thymich, German poet (d. 1694)
- July 1 – Polykarp Leyser III, German Lutheran theologian (d. 1725)
- July 4 – John Leake, English Royal Navy admiral (d. 1720)
- July 5 – John Hamilton, 2nd Lord Belhaven and Stenton, Scottish politician (d. 1708)
- July 7 – Guru Har Krishan, 8th Guru of Sikhism (d. 1664)
- July 15
  - Massimiliano Soldani Benzi, Italian sculptor (d. 1740)
  - Gerard Langbaine, English dramatic biographer and critic (d. 1692)
- July 16 – George Ashby, English member of Parliament (d. 1728)
- July 18 – Joachim Bouvet, French Jesuit active in China (d. 1730)
- July 20 – Johann Bernhard Fischer von Erlach, Austrian architect (d. 1723)
- August 6 – Claude de Forbin, French naval commander (d. 1733)
- August 12 – Claude de Visdelou, French missionary (d. 1737)
- August 16 – Christian Knaut, German physician (d. 1716)
- August 18 – Ferdinando Galli-Bibiena, Italian painter (d. 1743)
- September 6 – Guillaume Dubois, French cardinal and statesman (d. 1723)
- September 7 – Robert Molesworth, 1st Viscount Molesworth, Irish politician (d. 1725)
- September 9
  - Johann Caspar Ferdinand Fischer, German organist and composer (d. 1746)
  - Thomas Hewet, English landowner and architect (d. 1726)
- September 11 – Ulrika Eleonora of Denmark, Swedish queen consort (d. 1693)
- September 14 – Thomas Baker, English antiquarian (d. 1740)
- September 26 – William des Bouverie, English aristocrat and merchant (d. 1717)
- October 2 – Hendrik Carré, Dutch painter (d. 1721)
- October 20 – Nicolas de Largillière, French painter (d. 1746)
- November 3 – Georg Reutter, German composer and organist (d. 1738)
- November 8 – Edmond Halley, English scientist (d. 1742)
- November 18 – Jacques de Tourreil, French lawyer (d. 1714)
- November 20 – Duchess Eleonore Charlotte of Württemberg-Montbéliard (d. 1743)
- November 23 – Jacob de Heusch, Dutch painter (d. 1701)
- December 2 – Joshua Oldfield, English Presbyterian minister (d. 1729)
- December 11 – Johann Michael Rottmayr, Austrian painter (d. 1730)
- date unknown
  - Patrick Abercromby, Scottish physician and antiquarian (d. c. 1716)
  - Maria Oriana Galli-Bibiena, Italian painter (d. 1749)
  - Kateri Tekakwitha, Native American beatified in the Roman Catholic Church (d. 1680)

== Deaths ==
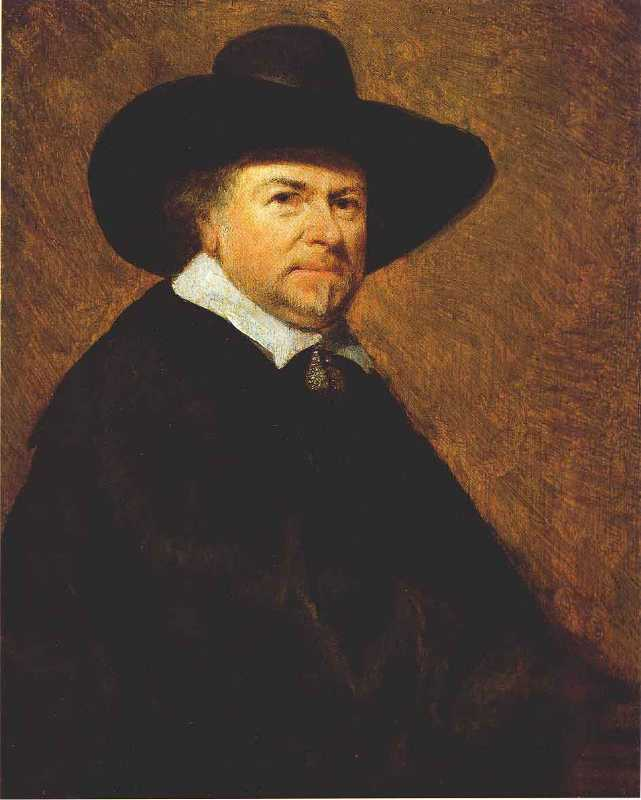
Jan van Goyen

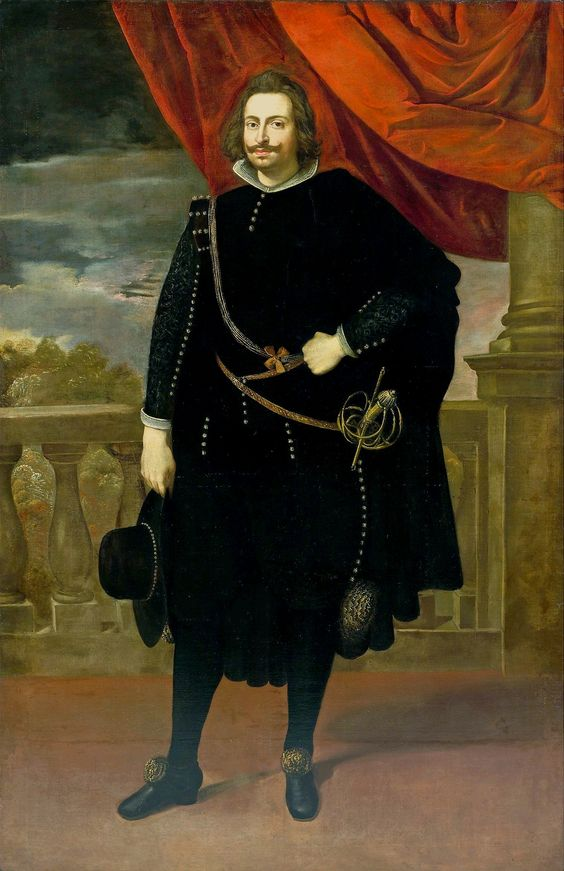
John IV of Portugal

- January 3 – Mathieu Molé, French statesman (b. 1584)
- January 18 – Augustus, Duke of Saxe-Lauenburg, German noble (b. 1577)
- January 22 – Thomas Francis, Prince of Carignano (b. 1596)
- February 13 – Ferdinando Hastings, 6th Earl of Huntingdon, English politician (b. 1609)
- February 25 – Henriette Catherine de Joyeuse, Duke of Joyeuse (b. 1585)
- February 27 – Meleki Hatun, influential Ottoman lady-in-waiting (killed by rebels)
- March 21 – James Ussher, Archbishop of Armagh and Primate of All Ireland (b. 1581)
- March 19 – Georg Calixtus, German Lutheran theologian who looked to reconcile all Christendom (b. 1586)
- April 7 – Krzysztof Arciszewski, Polish-Lithuanian noble (b. 1592)
- April 10 – Gerard Pietersz Hulft, Dutch general (b. 1621)
- April 24 – Thomas Fincke, Danish mathematician and physicist (b. 1561)
- April 27
  - Jan van Goyen, Dutch painter (b. 1596)
  - Gerard van Honthorst, Dutch painter (b. 1592)
- May 1 – Carlo Contarini, Doge of Venice (b. 1580)
- May 17 – Dirck Hals, Dutch painter (b. 1591)
- May 19 – George Louis, Prince of Nassau-Dillenburg, German noble (b. 1618)
- June 5 – Francesco Cornaro, Doge of Venice (b. 1585)
- June 9 – Thomas Tomkins, Welsh-born composer (b. 1572)
- June 12 – Charles Worsley, English soldier and politician (b. 1622)
- June 21 – Maximilian van der Sandt, Dutch theologian (b. 1578)
- July 2 – François-Marie, comte de Broglie, Italian-born French commander (b. 1611)
- July 6 – Giacinto Anzalone, Italian composer, conductor, and director of the Conservatorio della Pietà dei Turchini in Naples (b. 1606)
- July 12 – Giovanni Giacomo Barbelli, Italian painter (b. 1604)
- August 8 – Brás Garcia de Mascarenhas, Portuguese soldier, poet and writer (b. 1596)
- August 11 – Ottavio Piccolomini, Austrian-Italian field marshal (b. 1599)
- August 17 – Marie Anne d'Orléans, French princess (b. 1652)
- August 24 – Aegidius Gelenius, German heraldist (b. 1595)
- September 8 – Joseph Hall, English bishop and writer (b. 1574)
- September 22 – Christian II, Prince of Anhalt-Bernburg since 1630 (b. 1599)
- October – Stephen Bachiler, English clergyman (b. c. 1561)
- October 3 – Myles Standish, Mayflower colonist (b. c. 1584)
- October 8 – John George I, Elector of Saxony (b. 1585)
- October 12
  - Juan Alonso y Ocón, Spanish Catholic prelate, Archbishop of La Plata o Charcas (b. 1597)
  - Juan Tellez-Girón y Enriquez de Ribera, 4th Duke of Osuna (b. 1597)
- October 30 – Ferruccio Baffa Trasci, Italian bishop (b. 1590)
- November 6
  - King John IV of Portugal (b. 1604)
  - Jean-Baptiste Morin, French mathematician (b. 1583)
- November 12
  - Albrycht Stanisław Radziwiłł, Polish nobleman (b. 1595)
  - Hendrick van Anthonissen, Dutch painter (b. 1605)
- December 2 – Alessandro dal Borro, Austrian field marshal (b. 1600)
- December 20 – David Beck, Dutch portrait painter (b. 1621)
- December 21 – Thomas Trevor, English politician and judge (b. 1586)
- December 27 – Andrew White, Apostle of Maryland (b. 1579)
- December 28 – Laurent de La Hyre, French Baroque painter (b. 1606)
- Date unknown – Andrea Calcese, Italian Baroque era comic actor (plague) (b. 1595)
