= Francesco Erizzo =

Doge of Venice from 1631 to 1646

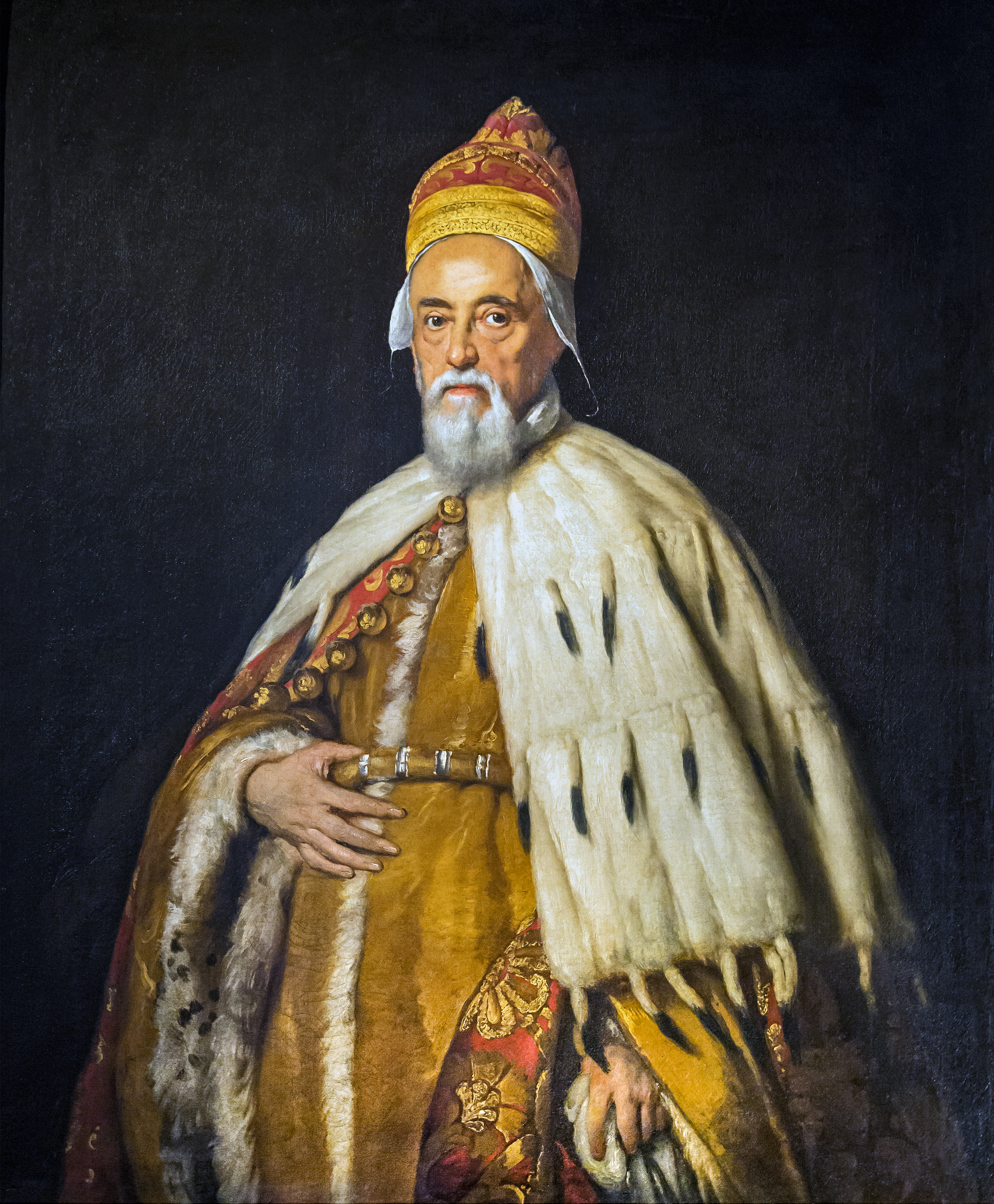
Portrait of Francesco Erizzo by Bernardo Strozzi, ca. 1635.

Francesco Erizzo (Venice, 18 February 1566 – Venice, 3 January 1646) was the 98th Doge of Venice, reigning from his election on 10 April 1631 until his death fifteen years later. His reign is particularly notable because the last year of his reign saw the beginning of a war with the Ottoman Empire for control of Crete that would last for 24 years and dominate the geopolitics of the Mediterranean.

== Background, 1566–1631 ==
Francesco Erizzo was born into the Erizzo family, a patrician family from Istria. Although he was not particularly rich (in no small part because he had to cover for the debts of his brother), he nevertheless had a successful career in the service of Venice. He acted as Venetian ambassador to both Ferdinand II, Holy Roman Emperor and Pope Urban VIII. He also served as provveditore of various Venetian possessions. Erizzo never married.

== Doge, 1631–1646 ==
Erizzo was elected Doge of Venice on 10 April 1631 in the midst of the Italian plague of 1629–1631, which killed one third of the population of Venice, including Erizzo's predecessor Nicolò Contarini. He was elected by a vote of 40–1, although historian Claudio Rendina has pronounced this election fraudulent. (The only dissenting vote was cast for Renier Zen, the opponent of Giovanni I Cornaro known for his incorruptibility.)

In light of the bubonic plague then decimating the city (it would claim 45,000 victims in all), Erizzo's election was not accompanied by the customary festivities. The plague finally subsided in November 1631. Erizzo's predecessor, Nicolò Contarini, had taken a vow to build a church in honour of the Blessed Virgin Mary once the plague was over, which church was built and named Santa Maria della Salute. Erizzo now ordered that Venice would celebrate the Feast of the Presentation of Mary (21 November) as the Festa della Madonna della Salute, where the city's officials parade from San Marco to the Salute in the sestiere Dorsoduro for a service in gratitude for deliverance from the plague. This tradition is still observed in Venice to this day.

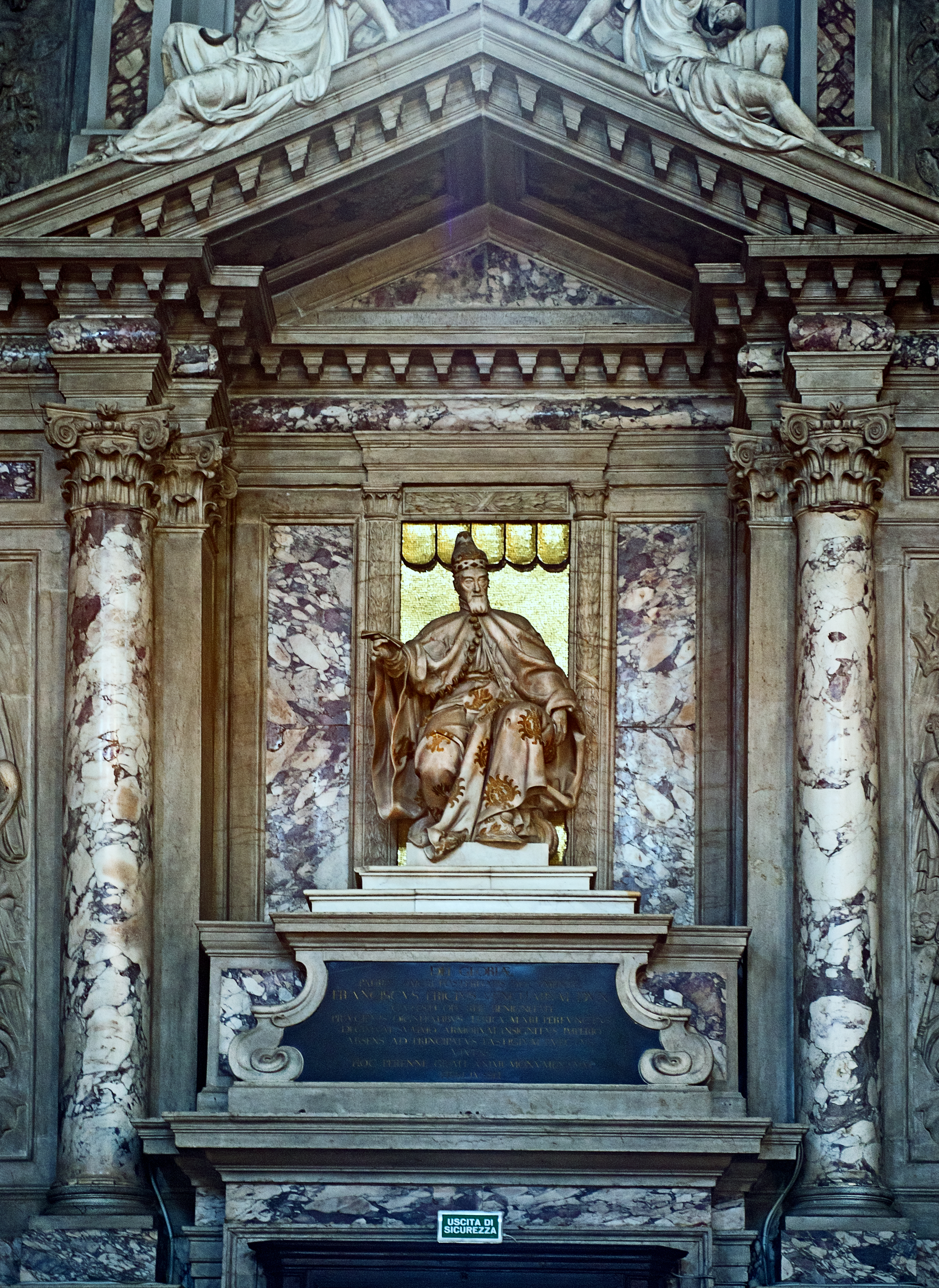
Monument to Erizzo in San Martino, Venice.

The 1630s were a time of relative tranquility for the Republic of Venice. The Procuratie were expanded (with gambling becoming a popular pastime there), and the Teatro San Cassiano, Europe's first public opera house opened in 1637, with the Teatro San Moisè following in 1640.

The tranquility of the era was interrupted briefly by the First War of Castro, in which the Papal States claimed the Duchy of Castro, which was under the control of the Duchy of Parma. Venice intervened on Parma's side, and in 1644 a peace treaty was signed that saw Castro remain with Parma.

In September 1644, the Knights of Malta captured a galleon of Turkish pilgrims bound for Mecca and then sought refuge in Candia (modern Heraklion) on Venetian-controlled Crete. Ottoman Sultan Ibrahim I blamed Venice for the attack and determined to conquer Crete from Venice. The war originally went poorly for Venice, which led Erizzo to ask the Senate of Venice to appoint him captain-general, which they did, over the objection of future doge Giovanni Pesaro.

== Death and legacy ==
Erizzo began assembling a fleet to sail against the Turks, but, at age 78, his health failed him, and he died only one month after his military appointment, on 3 January 1646.

The Sala Erizzo in the Ducal Apartment at the Doge's Palace in Venice is named after Doge Francesco Erizzo, and his coat of arms appears on the fastigium.

Political offices
Preceded by Nicolò Contarini	Doge of Venice; 1631–1646	Succeeded by Francesco Molin
