= Domenico II Contarini =

Doge of Venice from 1659 to 1675

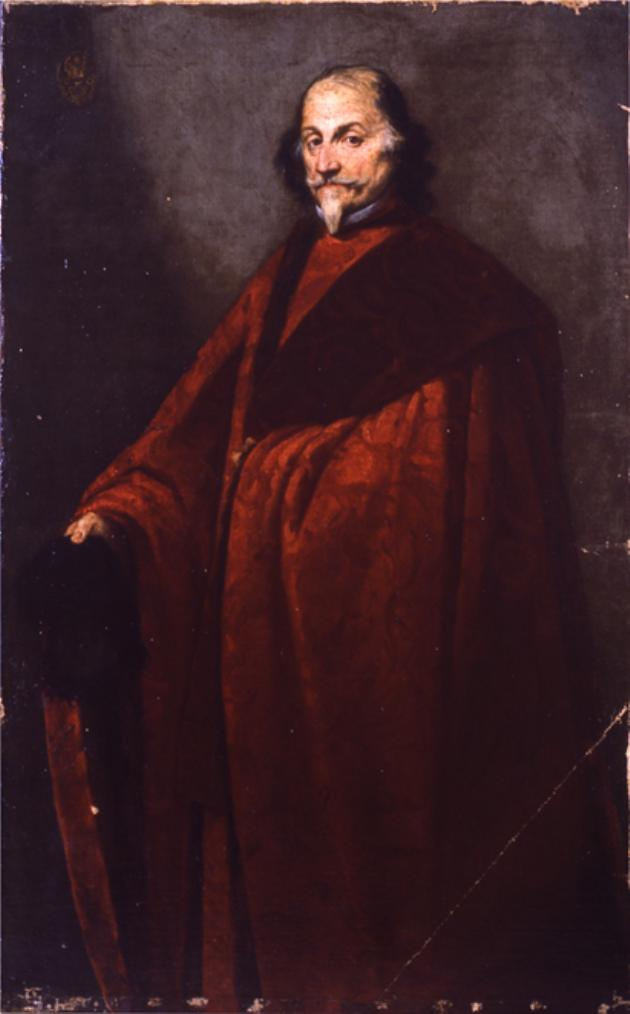
- Portrait by Nicolas Régnier

Doge of Venice
- Reign: 16 October 1659 – 26 January 1675
- Predecessor: Giovanni Pesaro
- Successor: Nicolò Sagredo
- Born: 28 January 1585; Venice, Republic of Venice
- Died: 26 January 1675 (aged 89); Venice, Republic of Venice
- Spouse: Paolina Tron
- House: Contarini
- Father: Giulio Contarini
- Mother: Lucrezia Corner
- Religion: Roman Catholicism

Domenico II Contarini (Venice, January 28, 1585 – Venice, January 26, 1675) was the 104th Doge of Venice, reigning from his election on October 16, 1659 until his death.

== Background, 1585–1659 ==
Domenico Contarini was the son of Giulio Contarini and Lucrezia Cornaro. He had one older brother, Angelo, who was born in 1581, and who probably would have become Doge himself, but for his premature death. Domenico Contarini came from the branch of the Contarini family known as the "Ronzinetti", after a nickname given to his ancestor Maffeo Contarini.

As a second son, Domenico Contarini did not initially have an active public life. His older brother Angelo was launched on a prestigious career through the cursus honorum of the Republic of Venice, but Domenico had to make do with a marriage to Pauline Tron. The couple had one son, Giulio Contarini (1611–1676) (who would eventually rise to the position of procurator of San Marco), and five daughters (Chiara, Maddalena, Laura, and two others who became nuns).

Contarini led a quiet and relaxed life, but he did play a role in the life of the city. He regularly attended the environs of government, always seeking advancement for his elder brother.

In 1627–1628, Venice was bitterly divided into factions, one of which was led by Doge Giovanni I Cornaro, who sought to create a power bloc for the Cornaro family in Venice, and the other of which was led by Renier Zeno, one of the Capi of the Council of Ten, who opposed this. Contarini did not take part in this dispute, and had unkind words for both sides: he criticized the Cornaro faction for attempting to seize power without having the means to do so, and he criticized Zen for his fiery rhetoric, which Contarini saw as disruptive to the state.

Although destined by birth to a secondary role, Contarini took naturally to the back rooms of power, and proved just as adept at attending the Senate of Venice as he might have been as a Senator. Nor was his public life totally non-existent: he was elected to the Council of Ten, even serving as savio of the Council, and in March 1655, he served as Vice-Doge for the period between the death of Doge Francesco Molin and the election of Carlo Contarini.

In the meantime, it appeared that his family's ambitions had come to naught. His brother Angelo had stood for election as Doge in 1646, but lost out to Francesco Molin. Angelo's death in 1657 appeared to sound the death knell for the family's ambitions: Domenico Contarini was over seventy years old, while his son, Giulio, was still too young to achieve high political office. It appeared that the work of a generation had been lost.

== Reign as Doge, 1659-1675 ==
A widower, Contarini retired to the Val Nogaredo to spend his final years in peace.

But then, Doge Giovanni Pesaro died suddenly on September 30, 1659, with no obvious successor. There were no strong candidates, only three weaklings: Alvise Contarini, Andrea Pisani, and Lorenzo Dolfin. The electors were split. According to the custom of the Republic of Venice, the Doge was elected by a group of 41 electors, chosen basically at random. Unable to settle on one of the candidates, and dissatisfied with the selections available, a compromise was worked out, and, on the eighth ballot, cast on October 16, 1659, 40 votes were cast for Domenico Contarini, breaking the impasse, and recalling Contarini from his retirement.

Many noblemen were furious at the election of Contarini. The Cretan War (1645–1669), an attempt to recapture Crete from the Ottoman Empire, had been ongoing for ten years at this point, and these noblemen believed that a young, martial leader was needed, not a septuagenarian like Contarini. Yet, throughout the seventeenth century, Venetian electors repeatedly preferred to elect old men as Doge so that the Doge did not grow too powerful: it was feared that a younger, more martial Doge would be likely to expand his power base and move the Most Serene Republic in a more monarchical direction.

Although he was surprised by his election, Contarini was happy to accept the post. He was popular with the people, who felt that he had never been overbearing during his public career. In spite of his advanced age, Contarini's reign as Doge lasted for sixteen years, and during that time he was able to bring a measure of political stability to Venice after a period which had seen multiple Doges in a short period of time.

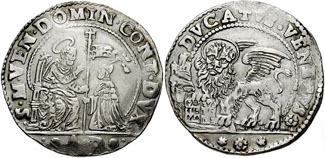
1666 coin depicting Domenico Contarini.

In Contarini's first decade as Doge, the war with the Ottoman Empire grew more intense. The Siege of Candia had been ongoing from 1648, but many Venetians feared that if Candia was lost, this would mean the end of Venetian hegemony over the Mediterranean Sea and the beginning of Ottoman hegemony. The Senate of Venice therefore vowed that Candia would never be taken. Thus, the Venetian treasury was depleted, merchant families were ruined, thousands of Venetian men were killed, and yet the siege continued. Domenico Contarini was widely praised in these years for his poise, and the nobility of his spirit, in carrying on the fight.

In the end, however, Venice was no match for the Ottoman Empire. On September 6, 1669, the provveditore of Candia, Francesco Morosini (appointed by Contarini in 1661, with his appointment renewed in 1667) was forced to sign terms of surrender. Morosini faced charges of cowardice on his return to Venice, but, after a brief trial, he was cleared of any wrongdoing.

In all, the Cretan War cost Venice some 134 million ducats and some 30,000 lives. In return, it had cost the Ottomans over 80,000 casualties and millions of ducats, all for a campaign that the Ottomans had thought would last only a few months.

After the unpleasantness of the Morosini trial (1670), Contarini found some happiness in his later years. Shortly after the ending of the war, Contarini's grandson Angelo (named after his late brother) married Elena Nani, and the young couple gave birth to a son, Giulio Felice, who was baptized in 1671.

Little else of note happened during Contarini's reign. After many years of war, Venice attempted to re-establish merchant routes and to balance its budget.

Contarini spent the last year and a half of his life bedridden, and finally died on January 26, 1675, at the age of 89.

One of his Corno ducale survives in the collection of the Ashmolean Museum.

Political offices
Preceded by Giovanni Pesaro	Doge of Venice; 1659–1675	Succeeded by Nicolò Sagredo
