= Domenico Contarini =

Domenico Contarini may refer to:

- Domenico I Contarini (died 1071), 30th Doge of Venice
- Domenico II Contarini (1585–1675), 104th Doge of Venice
