= Bertuccio =

Bertuccio can refer to:

- Bertuccio Valiero (Venice, July 1, 1596 - Venice, March 29, 1658), 102nd Doge of Venice
- Giovanni Bertuccio, a character in The Count of Monte Cristo
- A character in Mirette (opera)
- A character in Gankutsuou
