= Broad (English gold coin) =

English gold coin

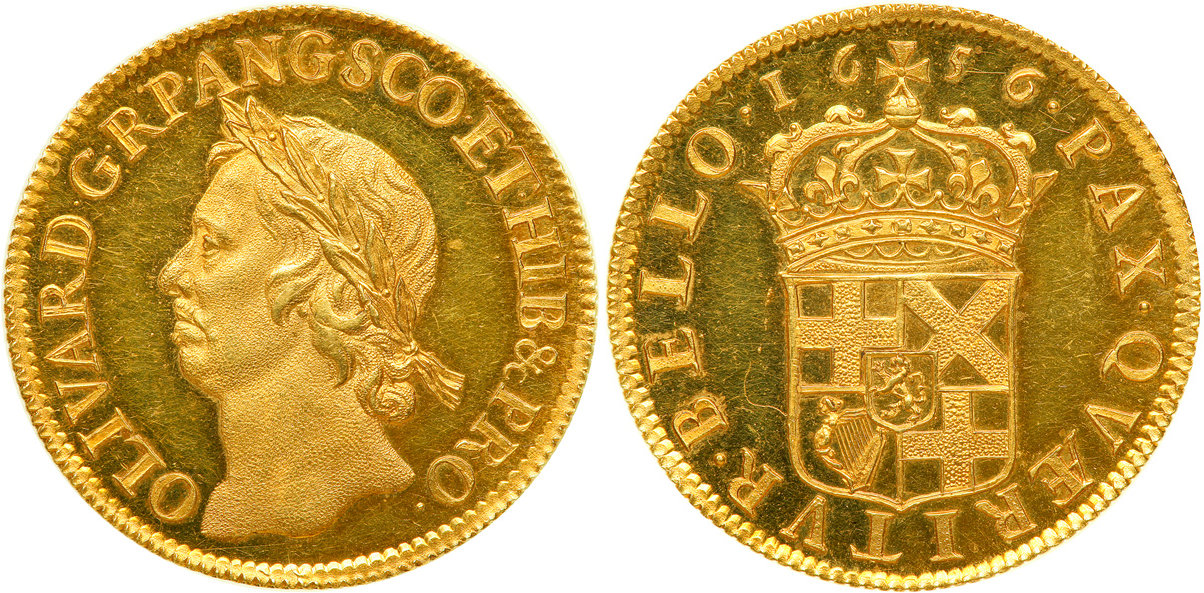
Broad of 1656.

The Broad was an English coin worth 20 shillings (one pound sterling) issued by the Commonwealth of England in 1656. It was a milled gold coin weighing 9.0–9.1 grams (8/25 troy ounce), with a diameter of 29–30 millimetres (1.1–1.2 in), designed by Thomas Simon (also called Symonds).

The obverse of the coin depicts the Lord Protector Oliver Cromwell as a laureated Roman emperor, with the Latin inscription OLIVAR D G R P ANG SCO HIB &c PRO [Olivarius Dei Gratia Res Publicae Angliae, Scotiae et Hiberniae etc. Protector] — Oliver, by the Grace of God, of the Republic of England, Scotland, Ireland etc., Protector, while the reverse shows a crowned shield depicting the arms of the Commonwealth with the inscription PAX QVAERITVR BELLO 1656 -- Peace is sought through war.

The current value of the coin in "very fine" to "extremely fine" condition is £27,000 to £54,000.

A piedfort version of the coin with an edge inscription is known as a Fifty shilling piece. This is extremely rare, and there are very few examples as it is probably a pattern.
