= Nicolò Contarini =

Doge of Venice from 1630 to 1631

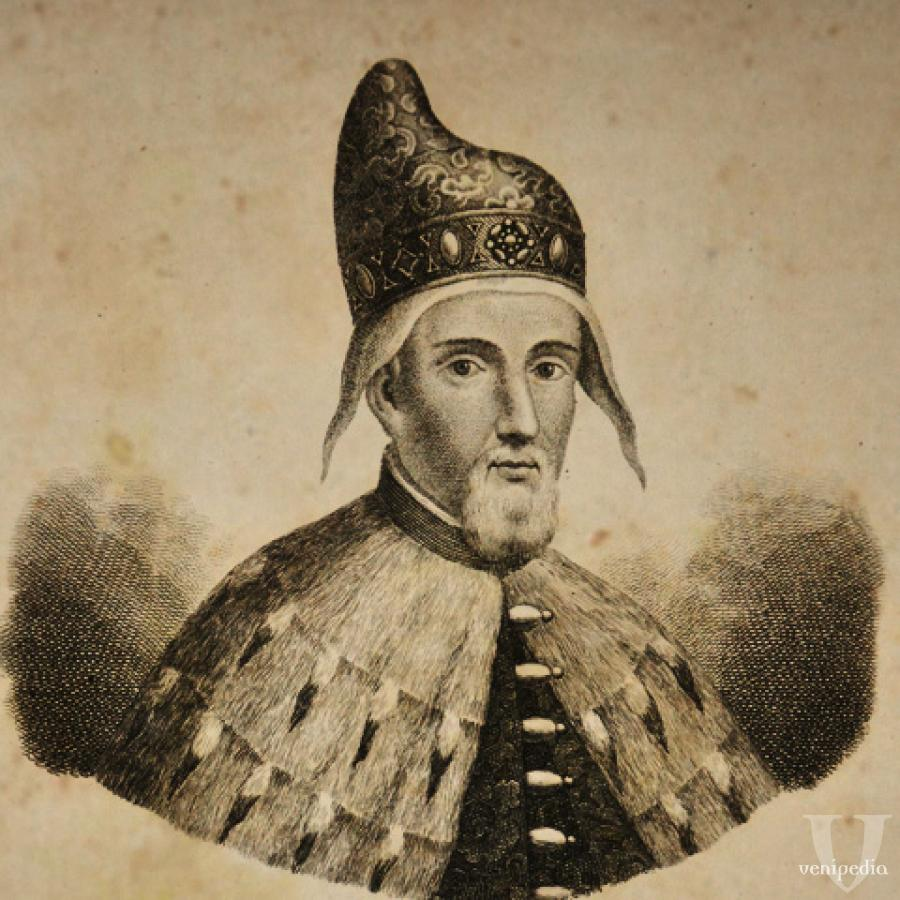
Nicolò Contarini, doge of Venice from 1630 to 1631

Nicolò Contarini (26 September 1553 – 1 April 1631), was the 97th Doge of Venice from 2 January 1630 until his death in 1631. During his tenure the Italian plague of 1629–1631 reached Venice, killing one third of the population.

== Biography ==
Nicolò Contarini was born in Venice, the son of Giovanna Morosini and Giangabriele Contarini, a man who was not rich, but who nevertheless was familiar with high culture. Nicolò Contarini became familiar with philosophy and soon gained a reputation for fairness in his conduct of the public administration of the Republic of Venice. Politically, he was a supporter of Leonardo Donato. During the factional divisions of Venice between supporters of Giovanni I Cornaro and Renier Zen in late 1629, Contarini was critical of Cornaro, but was never extreme in his opposition, which won him the respect of Cornaro's supporters.

Upon the death of Cornaro, a heated debate led to many rounds of balloting as supporters of Cornaro and supporters of Zen were unable to agree on a candidate. Contarini ultimately emerged as the compromise candidate and was elected Doge on 18 January 1630.

Contarini's reign began poorly, with Venetian troops, who were participating in the War of the Mantuan Succession, losing a decisive battle at Valeggio in May 1630, a predecessor to the unsatisfying Peace of Regensburg in October 1630.

Venice suffered its first outbreak of bubonic plague in June 1630. The government acted promptly, imposing quarantine on plague victims and burning the corpses, but it was unable to prevent the death of thousands. In October 1630, at the request of the Signoria, Contarini vowed to construct a church in honour of the Blessed Virgin Mary once the plague was over. Contarini died in Venice on 2 April 1631, before the cornerstone of this church, Santa Maria della Salute, was laid.

Political offices
Preceded by Giovanni I Cornaro	Doge of Venice; 1630–1631	Succeeded by Francesco Erizzo
