= Palazzo Molin del Cuoridoro =

Listed building in Venice, Italy

Coordinates: 45°26′04″N 12°20′05″E

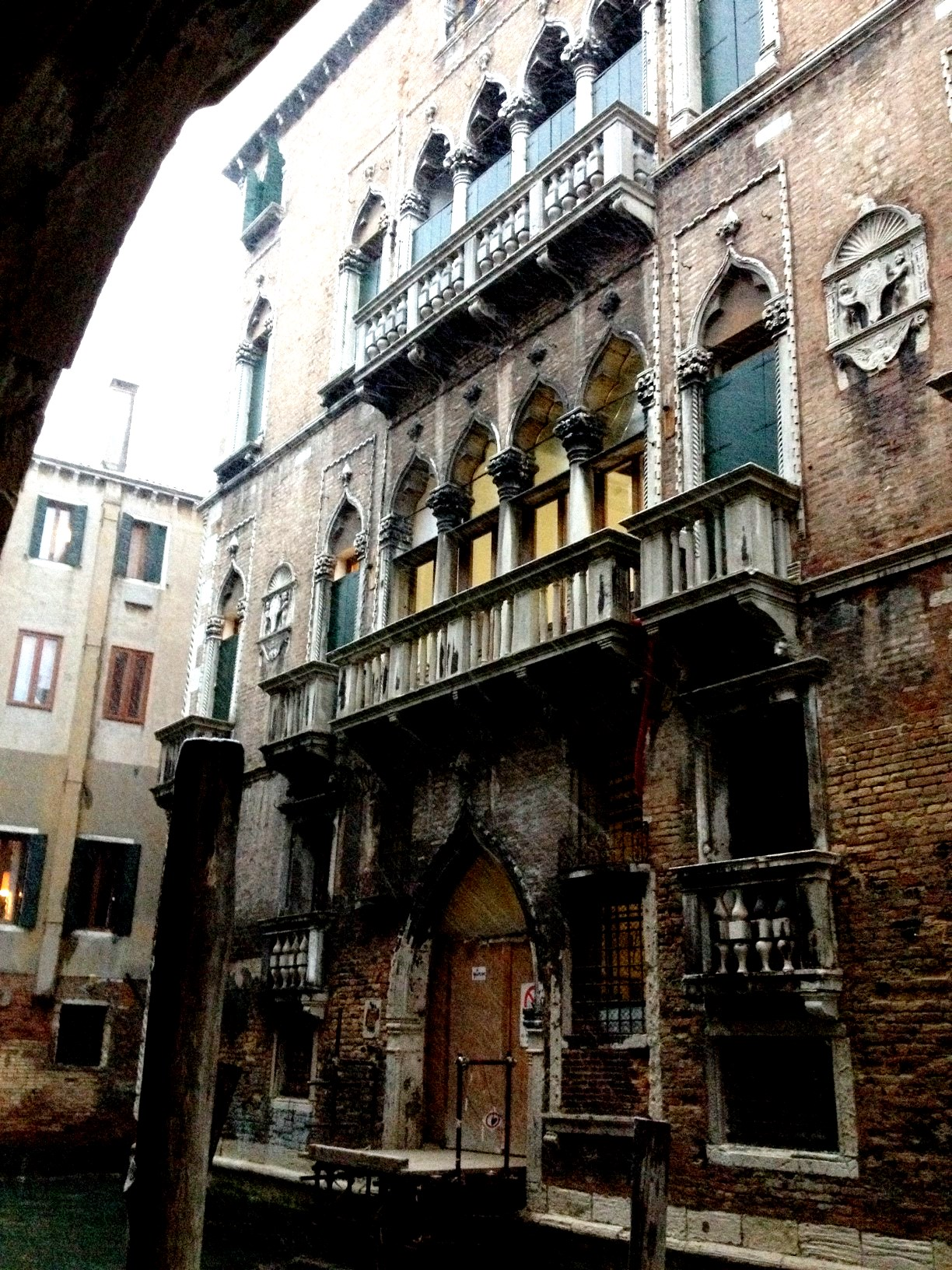
Exterior of Palazzo Molin, San Marco, Venice

Palazzo Molin del Cuoridoro is a 15th-century listed building in the San Marco district of Venice, Italy.

The palace was built in a traditional Venetian Gothic style, which was popular from the 14th and well into the 15th century and is currently being converted into 18 apartments.

== Location ==
Palazzo Molin is situated in the San Marco district of Venice, Italy. It is located between the Barcaroli and Fuseri canals and is also close to the historic opera house, La Fenice.

== History ==
The palace was home to the 99th Doge of Venice, Francesco Molin. The building is listed by the Belle Arti because of the historical importance of its façades and its architecture. Its main façade is an example of the Gothic Fiorito style.

The coat of arms over the entrance to Palazzo Molin belongs to the noble family of Molin. This represents a mill wheel and is the symbol of the house.

== Current renovation ==
Palazzo Molin was restored in 2013 and transformed into 18 apartments. The restoration preserved and maintained historic features within the palazzo, including the two water gates and the mullioned windows.
