= Francesco Cornaro (doge) =

Doge of Venice in 1656

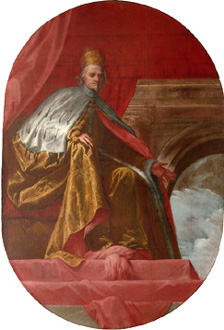
A portrait of Francesco Cornaro by Pietro Liberi.

Francesco Cornaro or Francesco Corner (Venice, 6 March 1585 – Venice, 5 June 1656) was the 101st Doge of Venice. His reign as Doge was the shortest of any Doge. He was elected on 17 May 1656 and died only a few weeks later, on 5 June 1656.

Francesco Cornaro was the son of Giovanni Cornaro, who was Doge of Venice from 1625 to 1629. Francesco Cornaro was married to Andriana Priuli, the daughter of Antonio Priuli, who was Doge from 1618 to 1623.

Francesco Cornaro had a prestigious political career. Cornaro soured on politics after an incident occurred while he was serving as the Ambassador of the Republic of Venice to the Duke of Savoy. The Duke became convinced that Cornaro was plotting against him and had Cornaro expelled from the Duchy of Savoy. After that, Cornaro withdrew from politics and devoted himself to business. It was widely believed that he would never be elected as Doge. However, after the death of Carlo Contarini on 1 May 1656 (a reign that lasted barely more than a year), Cornaro was elected Doge on 17 May 1656, only to die a few weeks later on 5 June 1656. He is buried in the Tolentini.

Political offices
Preceded by Carlo Contarini	Doge of Venice; 1656	Succeeded by Bertuccio Valiero
