= Christoffel Puytlinck =

Dutch painter

Christoffel Puytlinck, (Roermond, 11 November 1640 – Roermond, c. 1679) was a painter from Roermond (present-day Netherlands). He painted still lifes, chiefly game pieces and live and dead fowl.

== Life and career ==
Puytlinck was born in Roermond, Limburg, in the southern part of the Netherlands, where he was baptized on 11 November 1640. His name is also spelled Puijtlinck. He was the son of Theodorus Puytlinck, a goldsmith from Roermond.

He was active as a painter from 1663. He was active in Reims in 1663, and in Rome from 1667 to 1669. In Rome he joined the Bentvueghels, earning the nickname Trechter. In 1667 he was a witness in a trial regarding an English artist who was stabbed to death in Rome in Via del Babuino. In 1670 he returned to Roermond, where he was active from that year until 1679. In this period he taught Jan Frans van Douven, his cousin. He died in Roermond between 1679 and 1680.

== Works (selection) ==
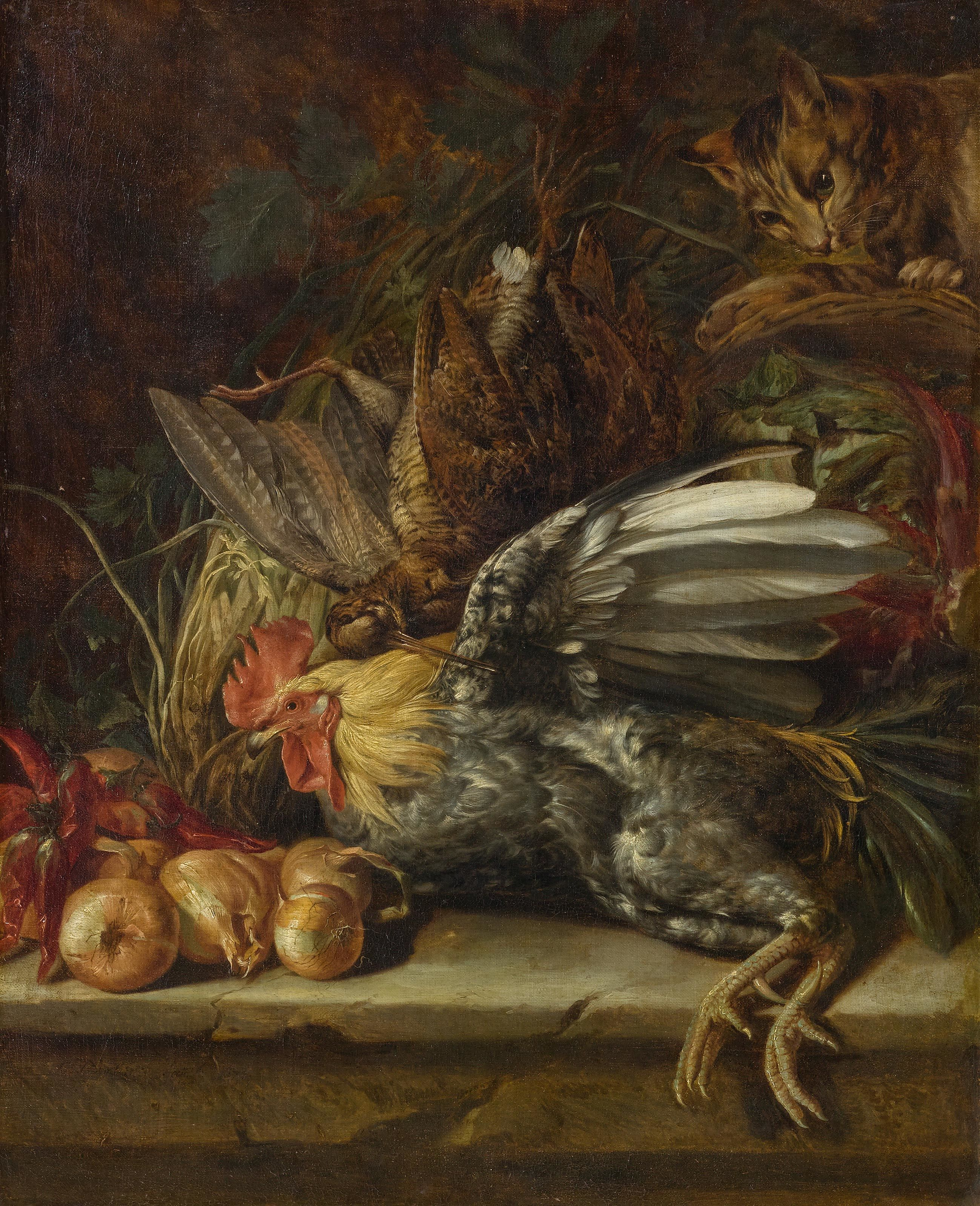
Still Life with Birds and a Cat, 1674

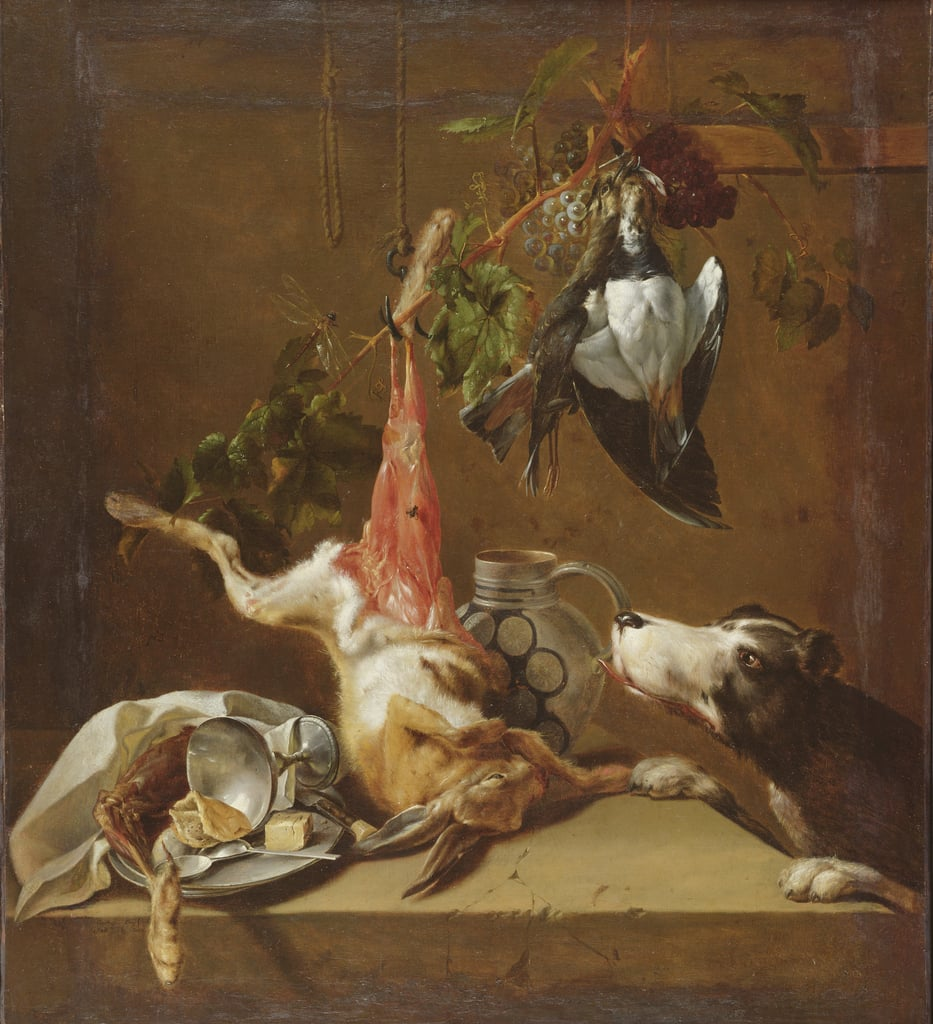
Hunting Dog and Game

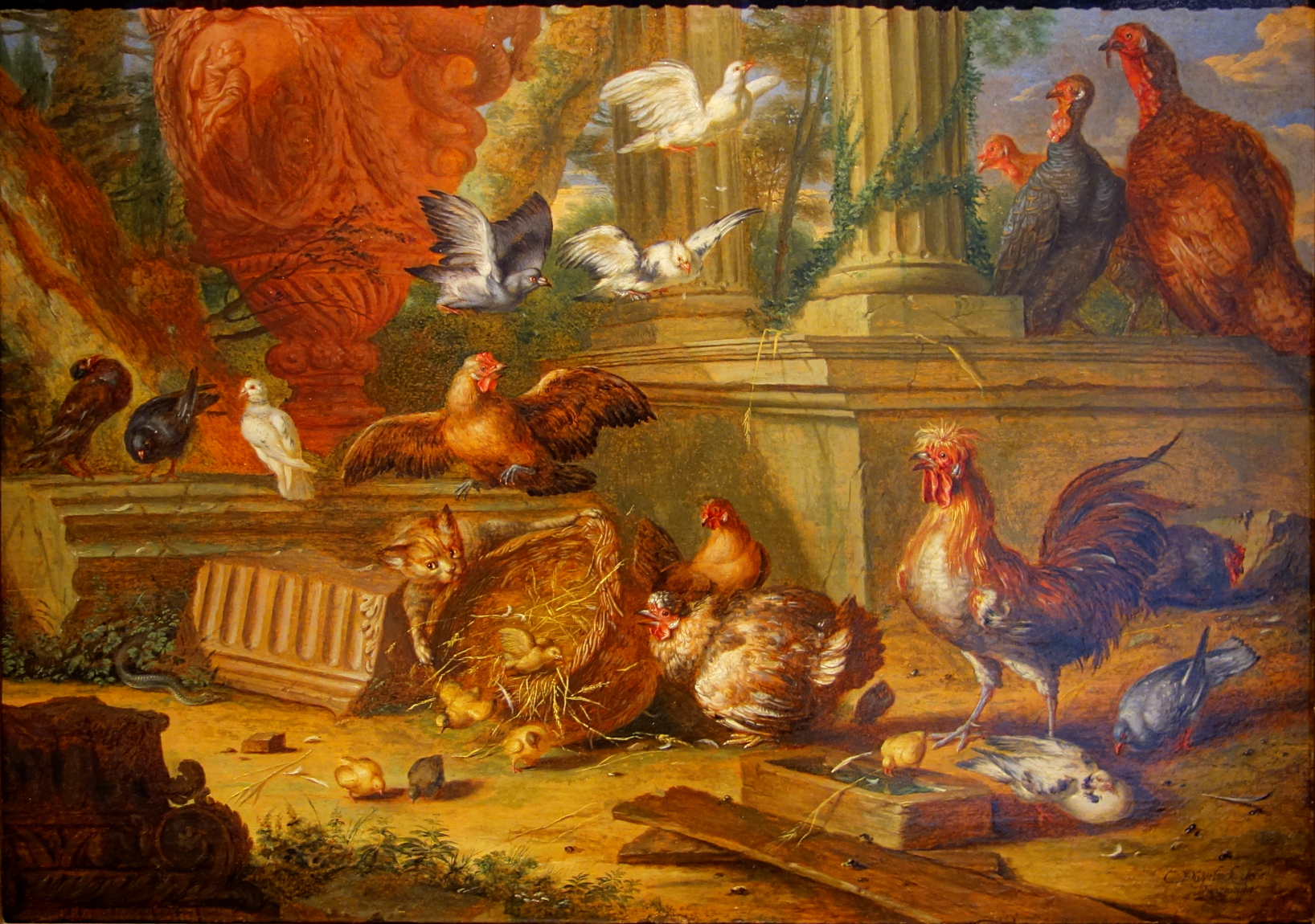
Classical Ruin with a Cat and Poultry, 1665–1670

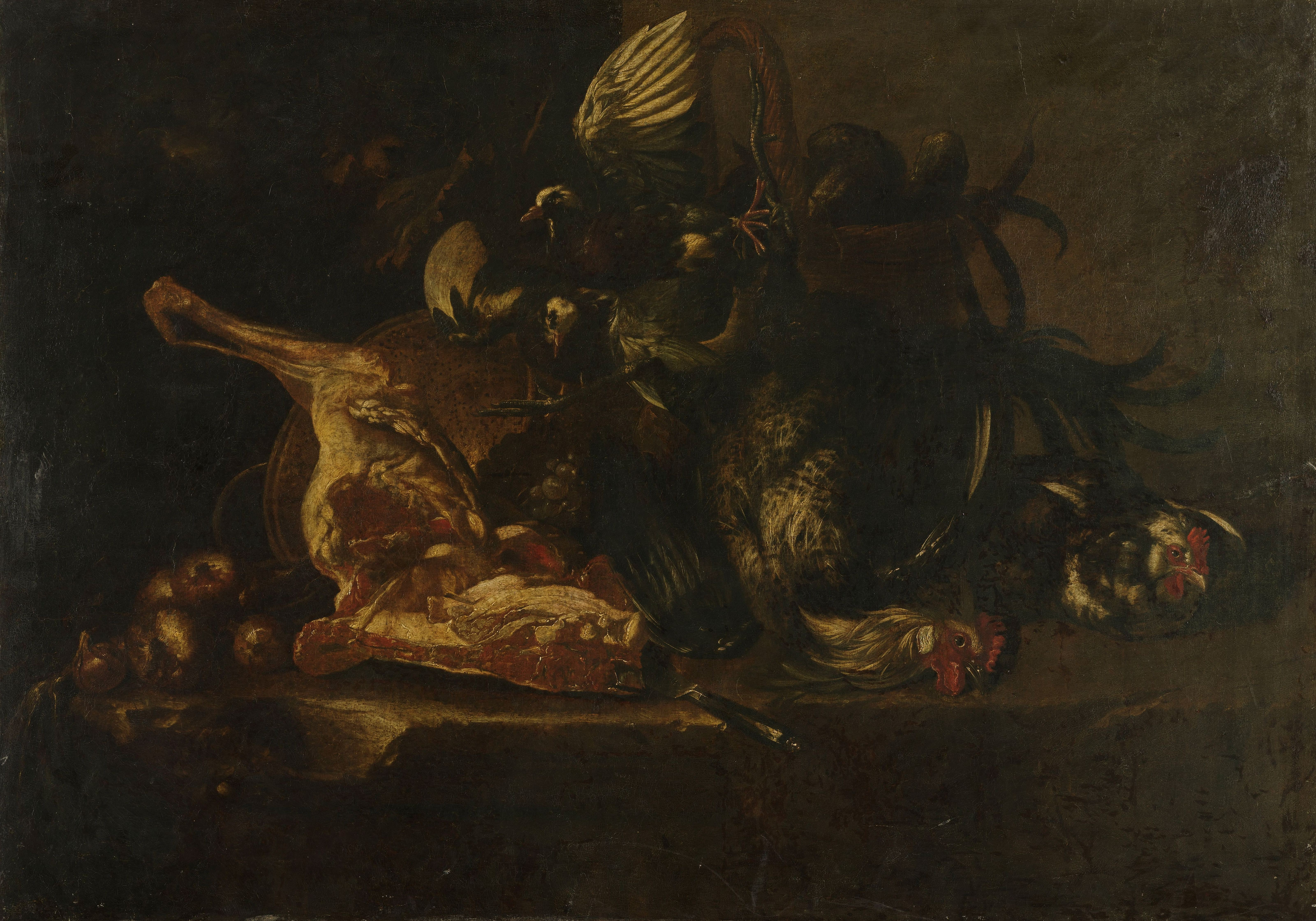
Still Life with Meat and Dead Birds, 1660–1671

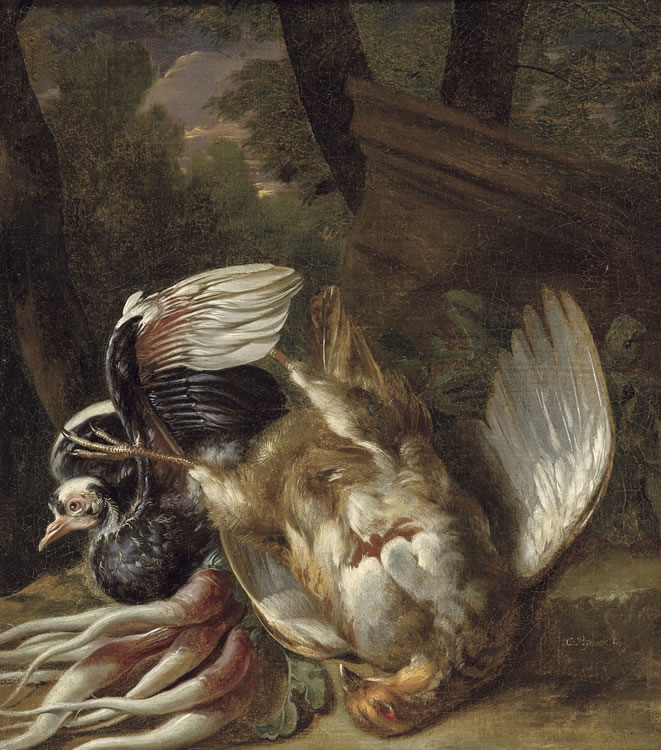
Still Life of Birds and Carrot, 1660–1679

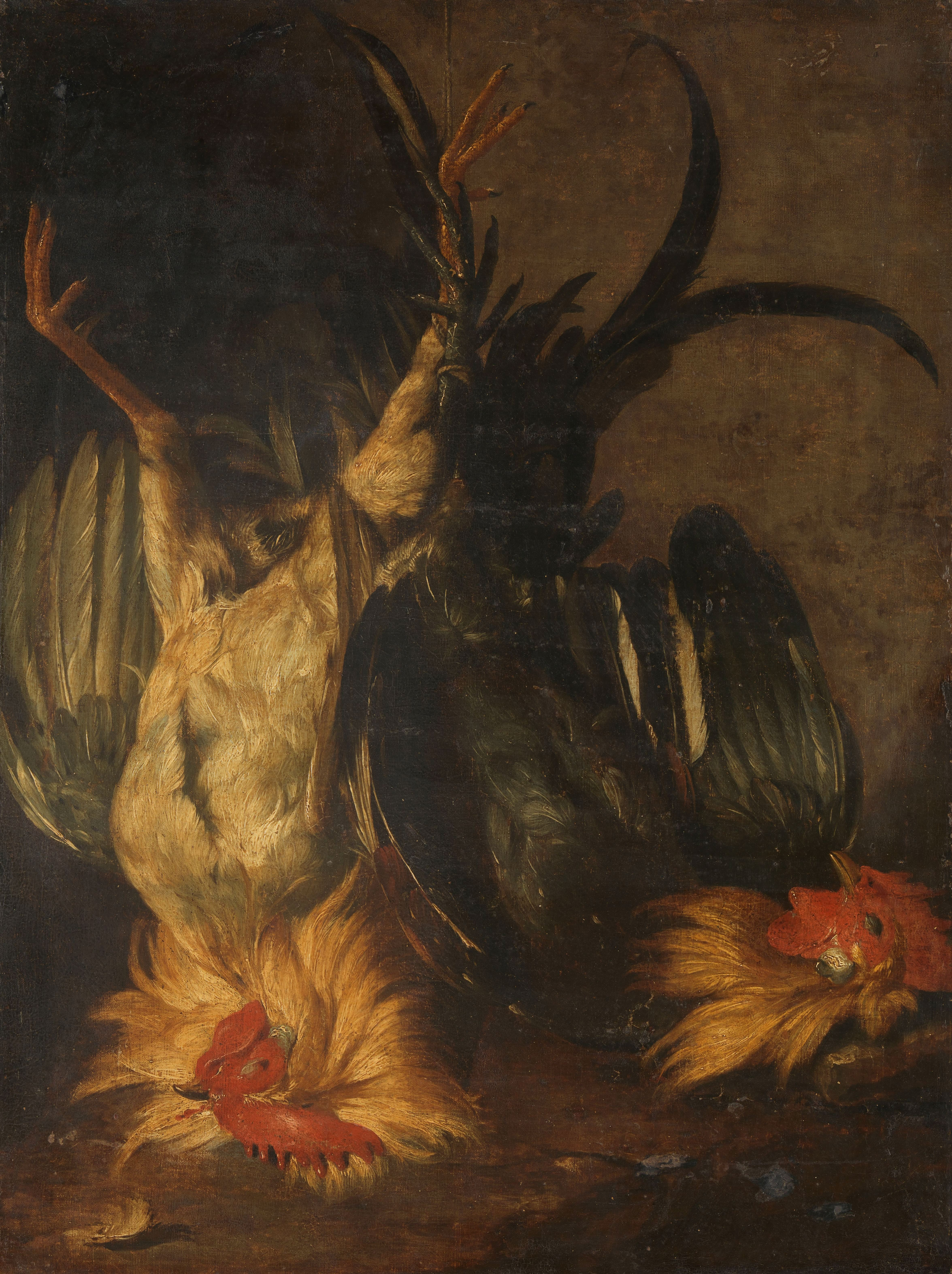
Still Life with Dead Roosters Hanging by Their Legs Against a Wall, 1671
