= Giovanni Pesaro =

Doge of Venice from 1658 to 1659

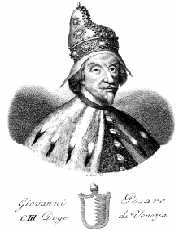

Doge of Venice
- In office 1658–1659
- Preceded by: Bertuccio Valier
- Succeeded by: Domenico II Contarini

Personal details
- Born: 1 September 1589 Venice
- Died: 30 September 1659 (aged 70) Venice

Giovanni Pesaro (September 1, 1589 – September 30, 1659) was the 103rd Doge of Venice, reigning from his election on April 8, 1658 until his death. The Cretan War (1645–1669) was ongoing for the entirety of his brief reign.

== Background, 1589–1658 ==
Giovanni Pesaro was the son of Elena Soranzo and Vettor Pesaro, a rich man. He rose to prominence quickly, being repeatedly elected as ducal councillor, as a member of the Senate of Venice, and then serving as the Republic of Venice's ambassador to the Vatican, prior to serving as Procurator of St Mark's.

In spite of all of these honours, his reputation was far from spotless. In 1642, he abandoned the garrison of Pontelagoscuro (a frazione of Ferrara), which he was commanding, in the face of the enemy. In the years following this incident, he was implicated of embezzlement and abuse of office. As rector, he appropriated land owned by a citizen for himself. Following the death of his wife Lucia Barbarigo, Pesaro married his housekeeper, a low born woman whose brother was a criminal banished from the republic.

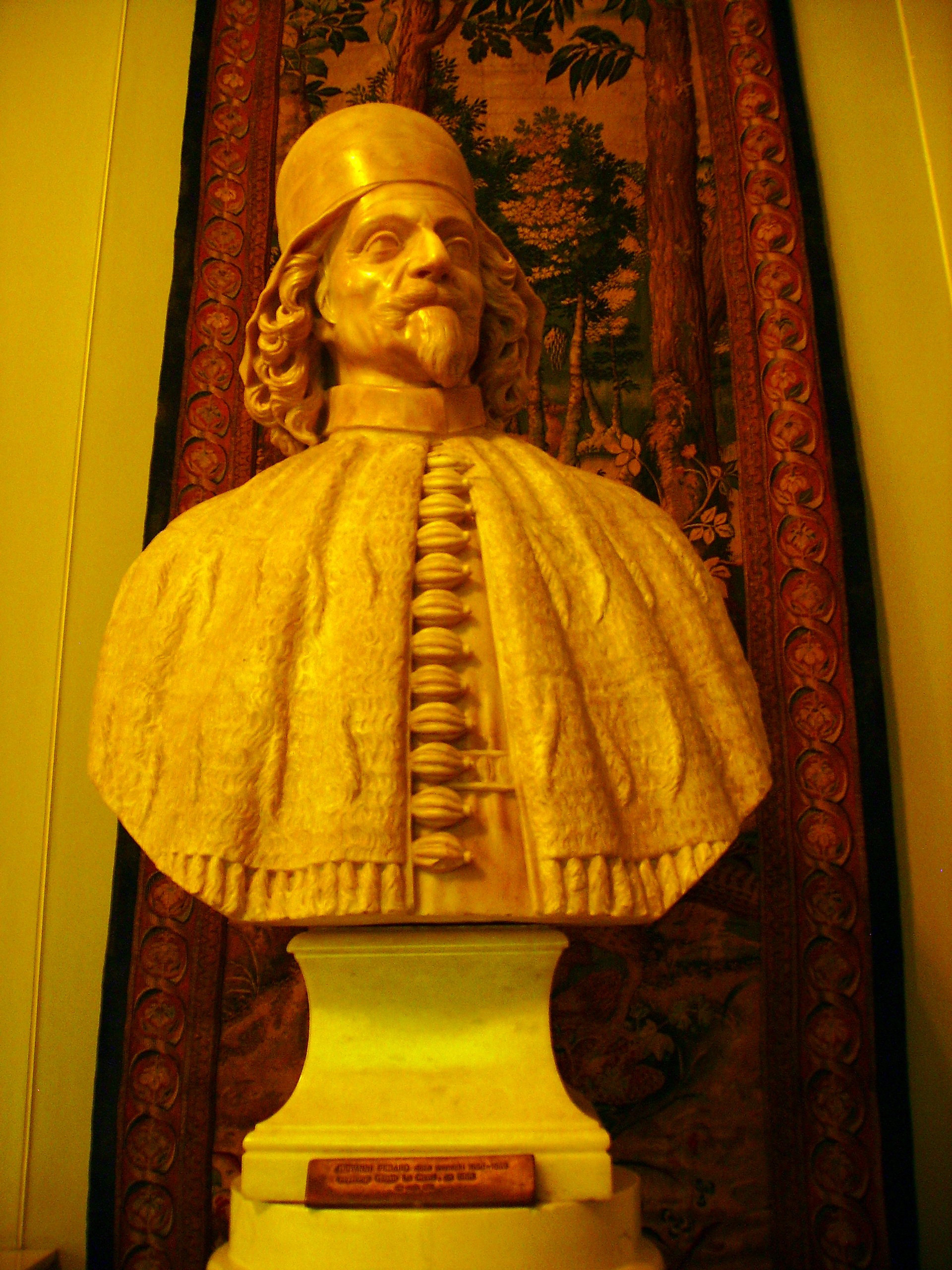
Bust of Pesaro on display in the Royal Castle, Warsaw

In spite of these shortcomings, Pesaro managed to work his way into the mainstream of Venetian politics. With the war against the Ottoman Empire at a low point, and many Venetian nobles considering giving up Crete, Pesaro gave an impassioned speech in the Maggior Consiglio (Grand Council) in favour of continuing the war, in the course of which he pledged 6000 ducats of his own money. This action inspired the other nobles to continue the war. His militant attitude won him great favour, and, following the death of Doge Bertuccio Valiero on March 29, 1658, Pesaro was the consensus candidate for new Doge of Venice.

== Reign as Doge, 1658–1659 ==
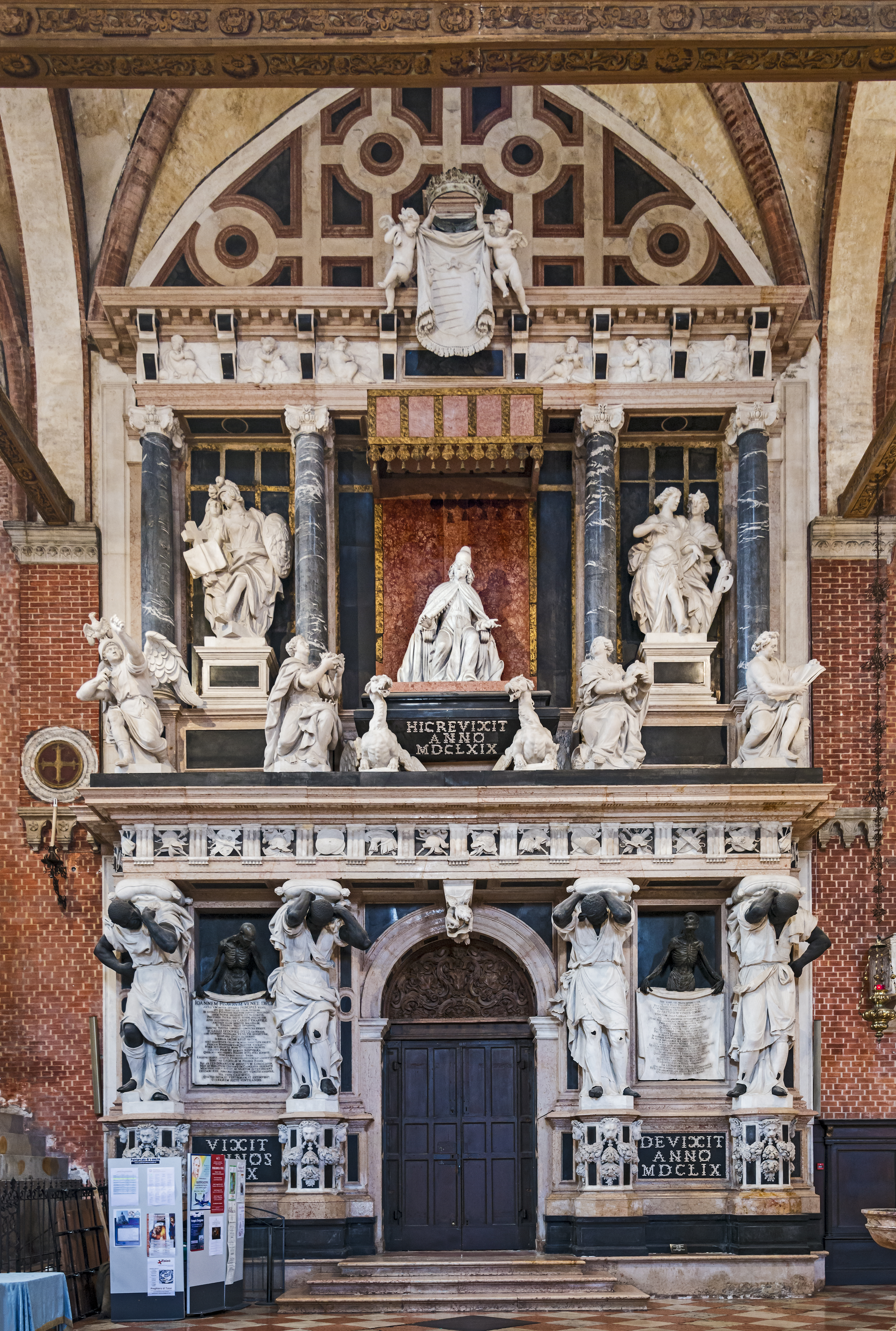
Monument to Pesaro in the Frari, conceived and designed by Baldassare Longhena

On April 8, 1658, Pesaro was elected as Doge on the first ballot, not least because he was considerably younger than his opponents, and it was hoped that he would have a longer reign than had his predecessors, a wish regrettably unfulfilled. Pesaro was hated by the people of Venice, and fell ill soon after his election as Doge.

Pesaro faced a difficult situation on becoming Doge. The war had displaced Venice's commerce, and Venice was heavily overtaxed to pay for the war.

Pesaro died on September 30, 1659, and was buried with great pomp.

Political offices
| Preceded by Bertuccio Valiero | Doge of Venice; 1658–1659 | Succeeded by Domenico II Contarini |
