= Francesco Molin =

Doge of Venice from 1646 to 1655

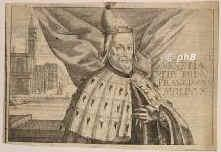
Francesco Molin

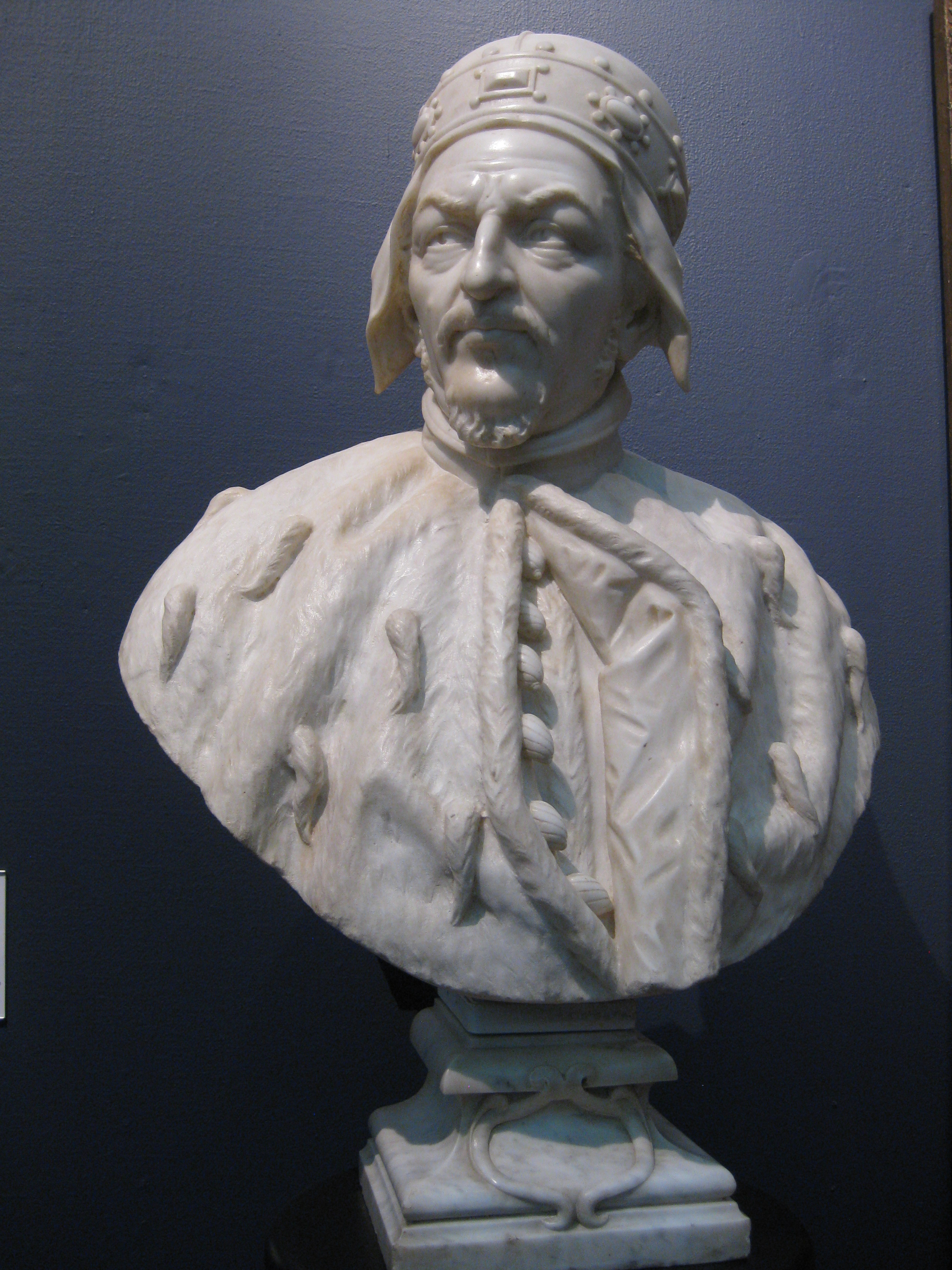
Marble bust of Francesco Molin by Justus de Corte, Birmingham Museum

Francesco Molin or Francesco Da Molin (21 April 1575 – 27 February 1655) was the 99th Doge of Venice, reigning from his election on 20 January 1646 until his death. Molin's reign is notable because of Venice's participation in a prolonged war with the Ottoman Empire over Crete; this war was begun during the reign of Molin's predecessor Francesco Erizzo, and dragged on until 1669. To fund the cost of this war, Molin sold access to the Venetian patriciate at a cost of 100,000 ducats per person.

== Background, 1575–1645 ==
The son of Marino Molin and his wife, Paola Barbarigo, Francesco Molin was born and died in Venice, and dedicated nearly his entire career to military – and particularly, naval – pursuits. As such, he served as provveditore of a number of Venetian possessions. In this, he gained a reputation as a practical and pragmatic man, and one given to diplomacy and compromise. He was chosen as Procurator of San Marco on his merits; on the outbreak of the Cretan War (1645–1669), he was selected as Captain General of the fleet of the Republic of Venice. He suffered from gout which rendered him intermittently unable to perform his duties. The Molin family lived at Palazzo Molin, in the San Marco district of Venice.

== Reign as Doge, 1646–1655 ==
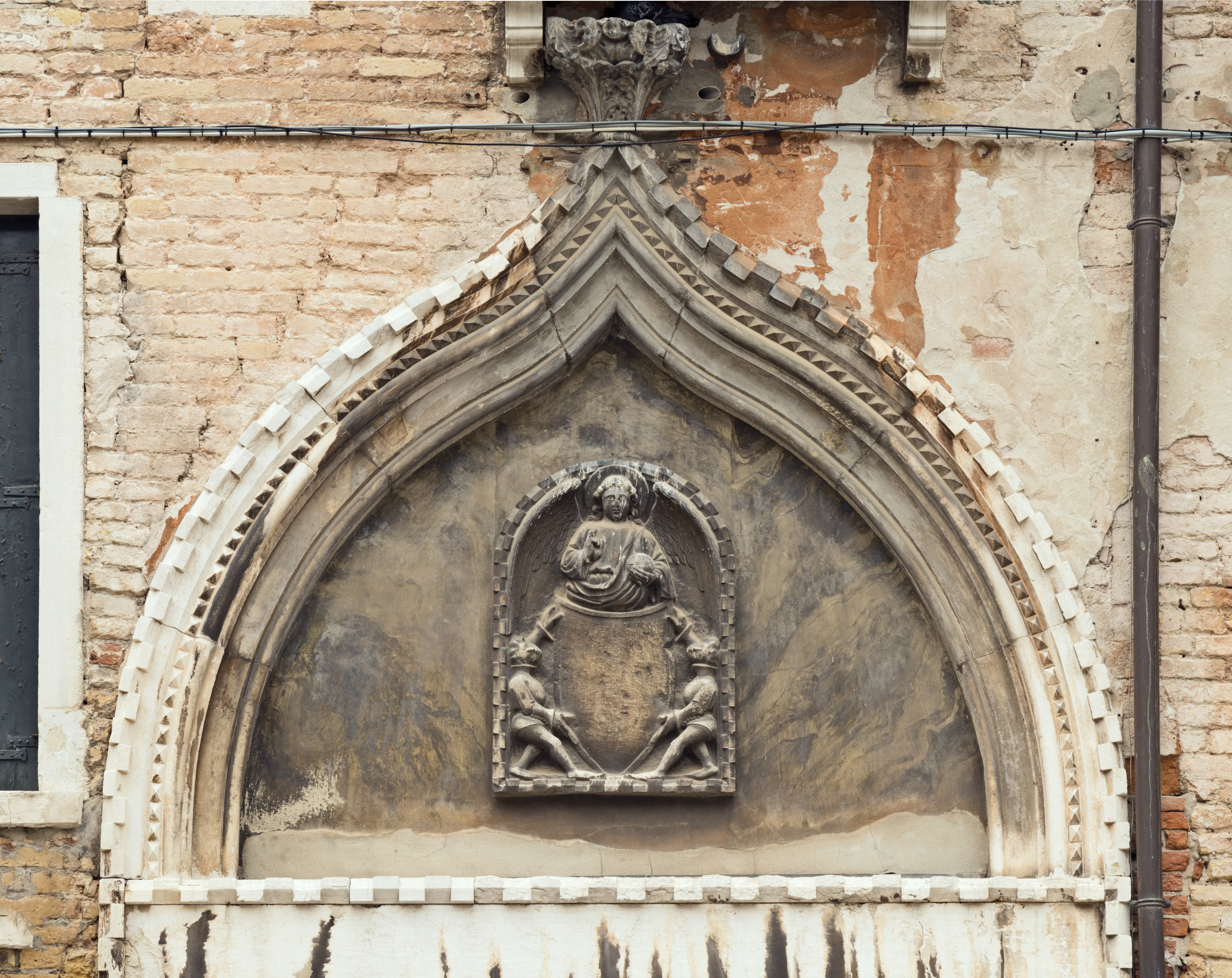
Palazzo Molin at Campo San Maurizio in Venice, bearing the Molin family’s coat of arms. The family belonged to the Case Nuove, the group of lineages from Acre in Israel added to the Venetian nobility in 1303.

On 20 January 1646, after 23 ballots and considerable expense, Molin was elected as the 99th Doge of Venice.

During his first years as Doge, Molin strengthened Venetian forces in the area around Venice, and in Dalmatia, hoping to be able to carry the fight to Ottoman territory. Venice saw a number of victories in these years, climaxing with Venice's capture of Klis Fortress, previously believed to be impregnable, although Venice proved unable to turn this to her strategic gain and advantage. All of Venice's naval victories were met with fresh Ottoman troops, raised from the vast expanse of the Ottoman Empire.

In an attempt to improve the situation, Venice led a fleet to the Dardanelles, where more Ottoman ships were destroyed, although a decisive Venetian victory still eluded Molin. In the campaigns of 1654 and 1655, Admiral Lazaro Mocenigo blockaded the Dardanelles; Mocenigo was killed during a third attempt, in 1657.

Given Venice's dire straits, it was forced to seek funds wherever it could. Molin determined to sell access to the Venetian nobility at a price of 100,000 ducats (60,000 ducats as a "gift" to the republic, and another 40,000 as a "loan"). These sales saw a number of new merchant families become Venetian patricians.

Molin died of a calculus on 27 February 1655.

Political offices
Preceded by Francesco Erizzo	Doge of Venice; 1646–1655	Succeeded by Carlo Contarini
