= Jacques de Tourreil =

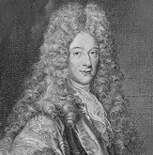
Jacques de Tourreil

Jacques de Tourreil (Toulouse, 18 November 1656 – Paris, 11 October 1714) was a French jurist, orator, translator and man of letters.

== Biography ==
The author of translations of Demosthenes and essays on jurisprudence, Tourreil was elected to the Académie royale des inscriptions et médailles in 1691, the Académie française in 1692 and the Académie des Jeux floraux in 1694. Being both an orator and a contributor to the first edition of the Dictionnaire de l'Académie française, he was given the responsibility of presenting the dictionary to the court, which he fulfilled on 24 August 1694 by delivering the compliments of the Académie to the King, the royal family and the ministers in a celebrated speech. Louis XIV replied to the delegation of academicians: "Messieurs, voici un ouvrage attendu depuis longtemps. Puisque tant d'habiles gens y ont travaillé, je ne doute pas qu'il soit très beau et très utile pour la langue."

The works of Jacques de Tourreil were collected and published in two volumes by Guillaume Massieu in 1721.

== Bibliography ==
- Georges Duhain, Un Traducteur de la fin du XVIIIe : Jacques de Tourreil, traducteur de Démosthène (1656–1714), Honoré Champion, Paris, 1910.
