= Jan Frans van Douven =

Dutch painter (1656–1727)

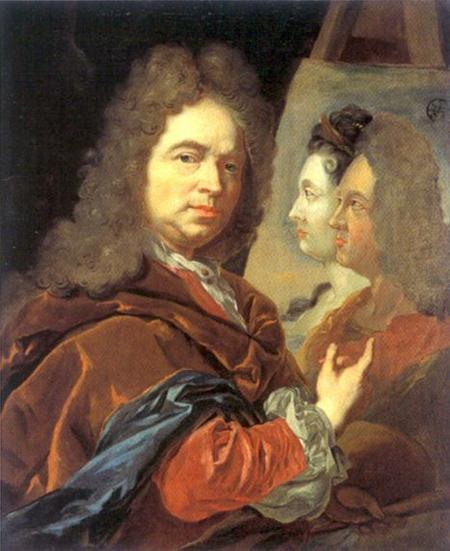
Self-portrait, c.1715

Jan Frans van Douven, or Johan Francois Douven (2 March 1656 – 1727) was a Southern Netherlandish portrait painter belonging to the Dutch Leyden School. Born in Roermond, he spent most of his life as Court painter in Düsseldorf, now in Germany, where he created most of his works.

== Life and career ==
According to Houbraken, his father Gerard Douven was a canon priest in the Roermond chapter and had spent several years in Rome, where he learned to appreciate art. He gave his enthusiasm to his son taught him Latin by age eleven and some art techniques. His father died young however (aged 33), and his mother apprenticed him for two years in Liege under the supervision of the painter Gabriel Lambertin (who had also studied in Rome). When his cousin, the painter Chistopher Puitlink, returned from his Rome journey, the young Johan studied with him. His work was noticed by Don Jan Dellano Velasco, the minister of finance in Roermond for Charles II of Spain. He spent 3 years working for him, copying the works of Roman painters for his large painting cabinet.

According to the RKD, he was the nephew of his teacher Christoffel Puytlinck, and the father of the painter Frans Bartholomeus Douven. In 1682 he moved to Düsseldorf, as the official painter of the Court of Elector Palatine of Rhineland, Johann Wilhelm von der Pfalz-Neuburg (also called Jan Wellem by the local people). Starting from 1682 he worked on a series of paintings ordered by Elector Palatine. These paintings depict scenes from the quotidian life of the Prince and his second wife, Anna Maria Luisa de' Medici (Scenes from the life of the Court of Düsseldorf). Van Douven played a major role in the establishment of the Painting Gallery of the Palace of Düsseldorf.

Van Douven also travelled to Vienna, accompanying the Elector Palatine on a journey. On this occasion he painted the portraits of the Emperor and the Empress. He also painted portraits of other princes and aristocrats or celebrities, such as the renowned musician Arcangelo Corelli.

He died in 1727 in Düsseldorf.

== Works (selection) ==
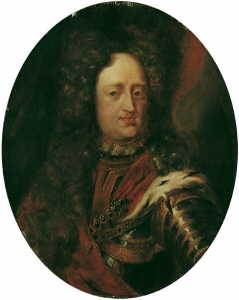
Portrait of Jan Wellem

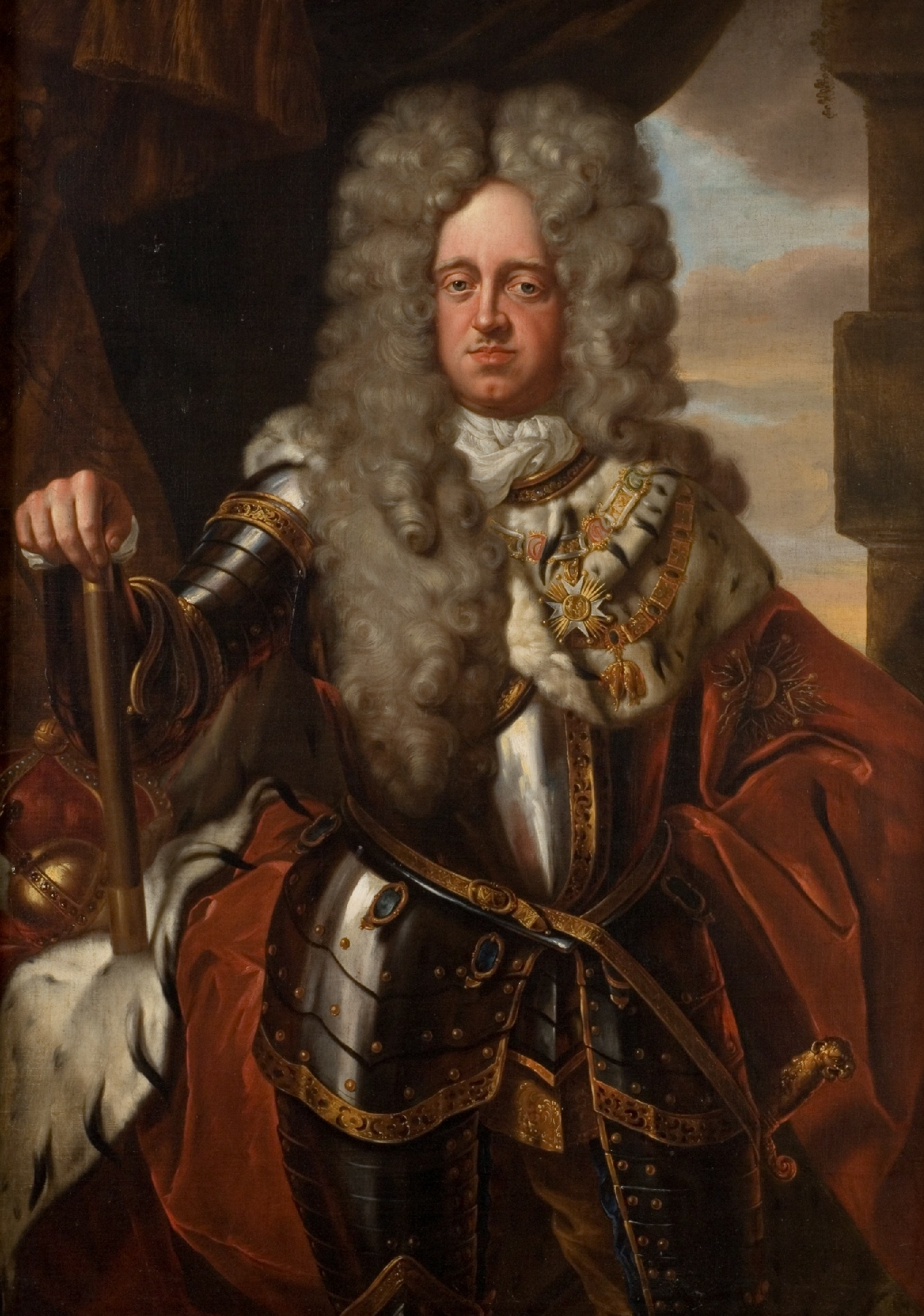
Portrait of Jan Wellem

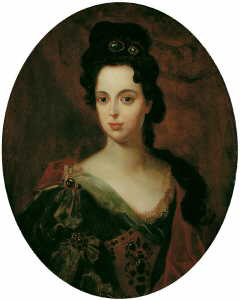
Portrait of Anna Maria Luisa de' Medici

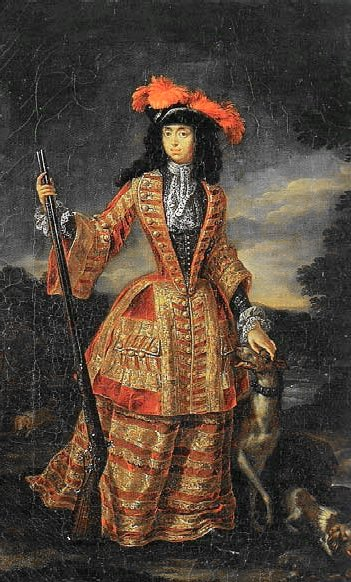
Portrait of Anna Maria Luisa de' Medici in hunting dress

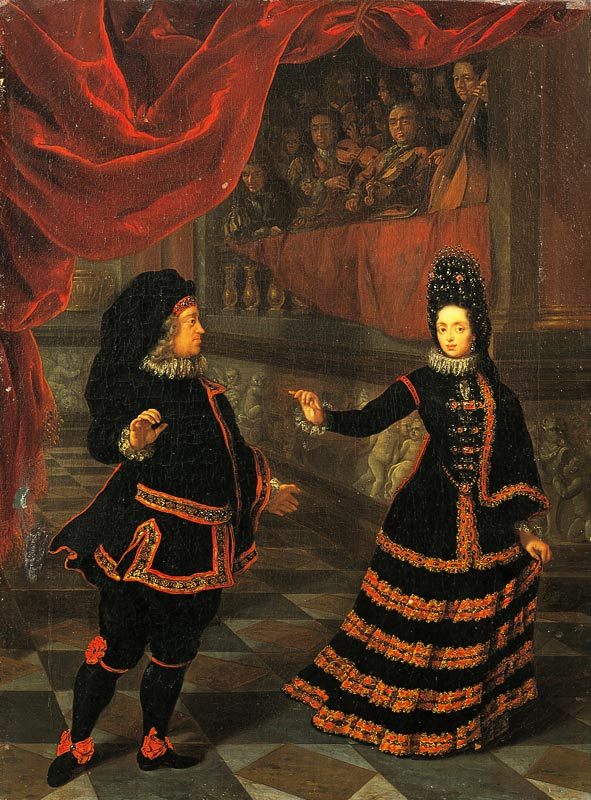
Elector Palatine and his wife in Spanish costumes, dancing

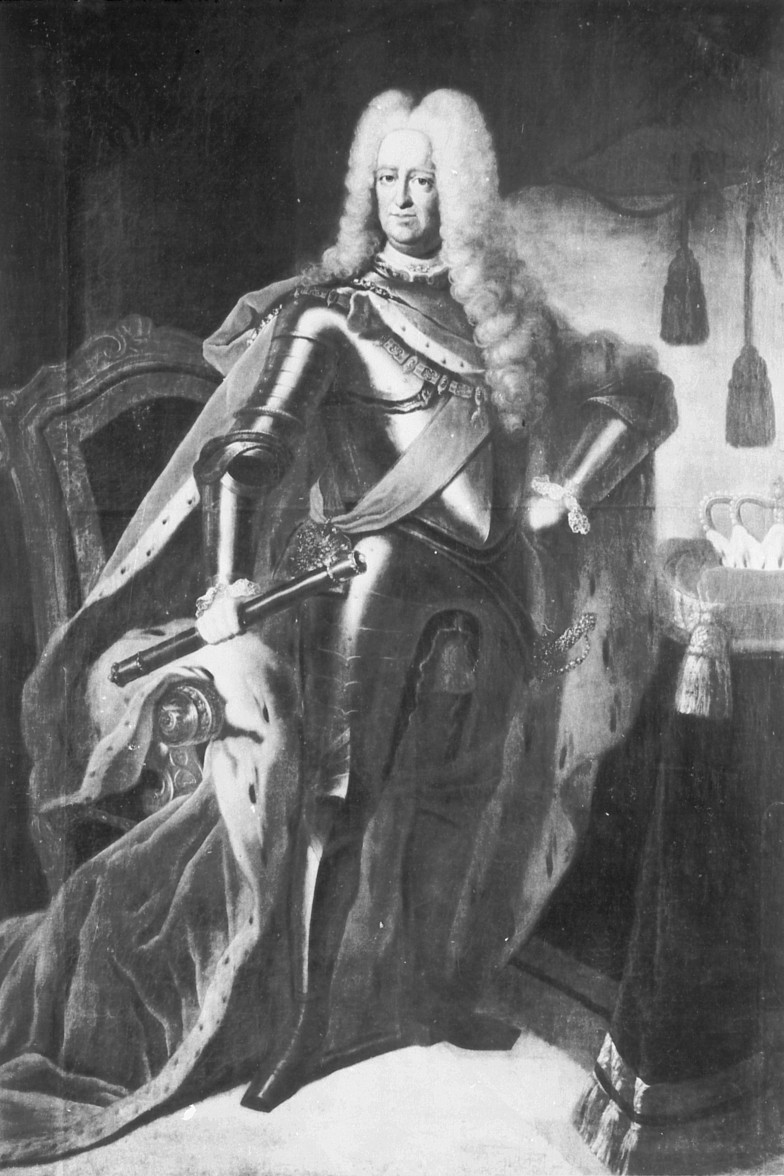
Portrait of Karl III Philipp von der Pfalz

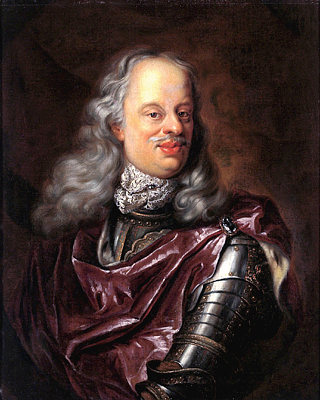
Portrait of Cosimo III de' Medici, Grand Duke of Tuscany

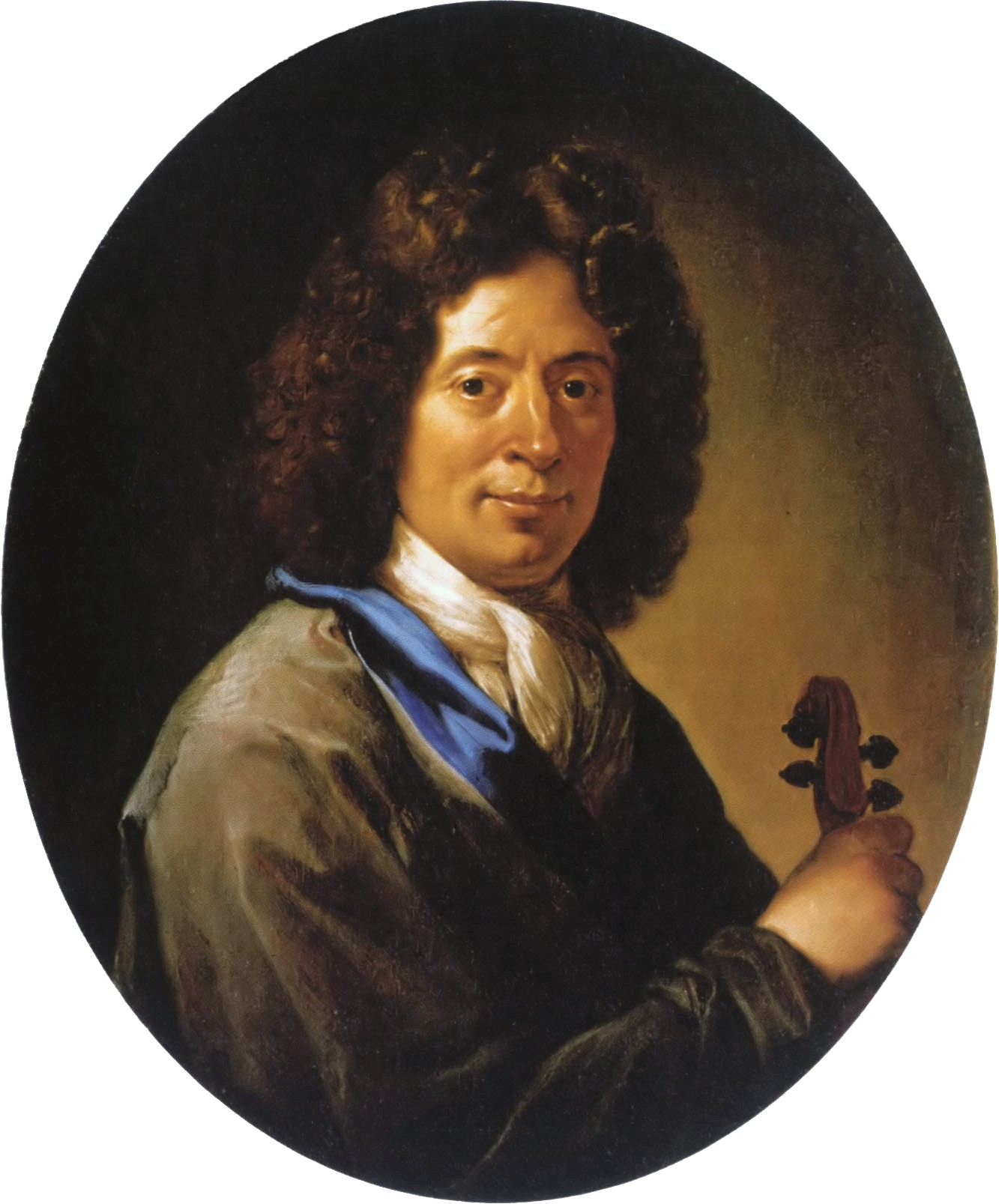
Portrait of Arcangelo Corelli
