= Andrea Calcese =

Italian comic actor

Andrea Calcese (Naples, 10th August 1587; 10th May 1656), also called Ciuccio, was an Italian comic actor of the Baroque era. He is best remembered as one of the fill the role of Pulcinella. He worked under Silvio Fiorillo in Naples. He began reciting verses at the theater at San Giorgio dei Genovesi, adding comic touches. In 1618, he began taking the mask and costume of Pulcinella, and because renown for his talented improvisational recitations. He is said to have been a tailor prior to becoming a comic actor. He was born in Naples, and died there from the plague in 1656. His pupil was Michele Fracanzani.

== Sources ==
- Boni, Filippo de' (1852). Biografia degli artisti ovvero dizionario della vita e delle opere dei pittori, degli scultori, degli intagliatori, dei tipografi e dei musici di ogni nazione che fiorirono da'tempi più remoti sino á nostri giorni. Seconda Edizione. (in Italian). Venice; Googlebooks: Presso Andrea Santini e Figlio. p. 167.
- Vincenzo Palmisciano, Sui due attori napoletani Ambrogio Buonomo e Andrea Calcese, in Studi secenteschi, vol. LXI (2020), pp. 304-305.
- Vincenzo Palmisciano-Sonia Benedetto (2024). Un amore segreto alla corte vicereale di Napoli, nelle opere di don Giuseppe Storace d'Afflitto (in Italian). Naples: KDP. pp. 39, 680.
