= Devil's Birthday =

Humorous term in Denmark and Norway

The Devil's Birthday (Danish and Norwegian: Fandens fødselsdag) is a humorous term in Denmark and Norway referring to 11 June and 11 December. A royal decree by King Frederick III of Denmark, issued on 17 December 1656, ordered that loan repayments and interest payments should take place on these dates.

The term has been documented in written Danish since 1888.
