= Bertuccio Valier =

Doge of Venice from 1656 to 1658

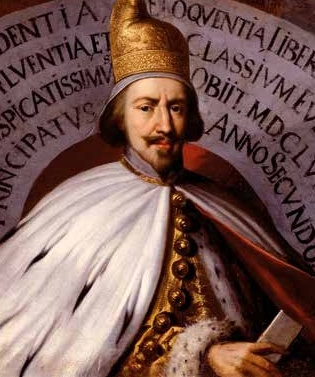
- Official Portrait by Pietro Liberi

Doge of Venice
- In office 1656–1658
- Preceded by: Francesco Cornaro
- Succeeded by: Giovanni Pesaro

Personal details
- Born: 1 July 1596
- Died: 29 March 1658 (aged 61)

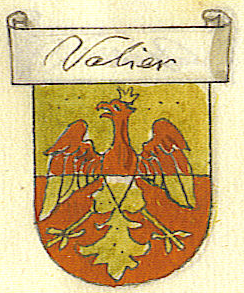
Coat of arms of the Valier family

Bertuccio Valier or Valiero (1 July 1596, Venice – 30 March 1658, Venice) was the 102nd Doge of Venice from his election on 15 June 1656 until his death in 1658.

== Background, 1596–1656 ==
Bertuccio Valier was the son of Silvestro Valier and Bianca Priuli. We are not certain how he was educated, but he had a reputation as being cultivated and refined. He married Benedetta Pisani, and the couple had many children together. All of Valier's children predeceased him except for his son Silvestro Valier, who would himself serve as Doge of Venice from 1694 to 1700. He suffered health problems throughout his life.

Valier was very wealthy, which allowed him to obtain prestigious posts in Venetian politics and diplomacy. He served as podestà of various towns in Venice's Terraferma, and as Venetian Ambassador to the Vatican during the pontificate of Pope Alexander VII.

== Reign as Doge, 1656–1658 ==
Valier became Doge in the midst of a prolonged war with the Ottoman Empire for possession of Crete, which had been ongoing since 1645. Upon the death of Doge Carlo Contarini on 1 May 1656 Valier became a candidate as Doge. On 17 May 1656, however, he lost the election to Francesco Cornaro, who died only nineteen days later. A second election was held on 15 June and Valier was unanimously elected as Doge on the first ballot. He was already in ill health and would be dead less than two years later, meaning Venice, in the midst of its war, would have seen five Doges in the space of four years.

During Valier's reign, the Most Serene Republic proposed terms for ending the Cretan War, but these were rejected by the Ottoman Empire. Valier ordered a Venetian fleet to sail through the Dardanelles to attack Istanbul, in the hopes that this would at least relieve the pressure on the Siege of Candia; this expedition had only limited success.

Desperate for money with which to fund the war, in 1655, Valier allowed the Jesuits, who had been expelled from the Venetian Republic by Leonardo Donato in 1606, to return in exchange for a cash payment. Venice was desperate for funds, and, despite the fact that Valier contributed 10,000 ducats of his own money, Venice was nearly insolvent.

Valier succumbed to sickness on 29 March 1658, aged only 61. He was interred in the Basilica di San Giovanni e Paolo, a traditional burial place of the doges. His son, Silvestro Valier, was his sole legatee. Silvestro Valier would later have a massive monumental tomb built in the Basilica, and Bertuccio Valier's remains were also placed there. Thus, father and son, and their wives, are buried together.

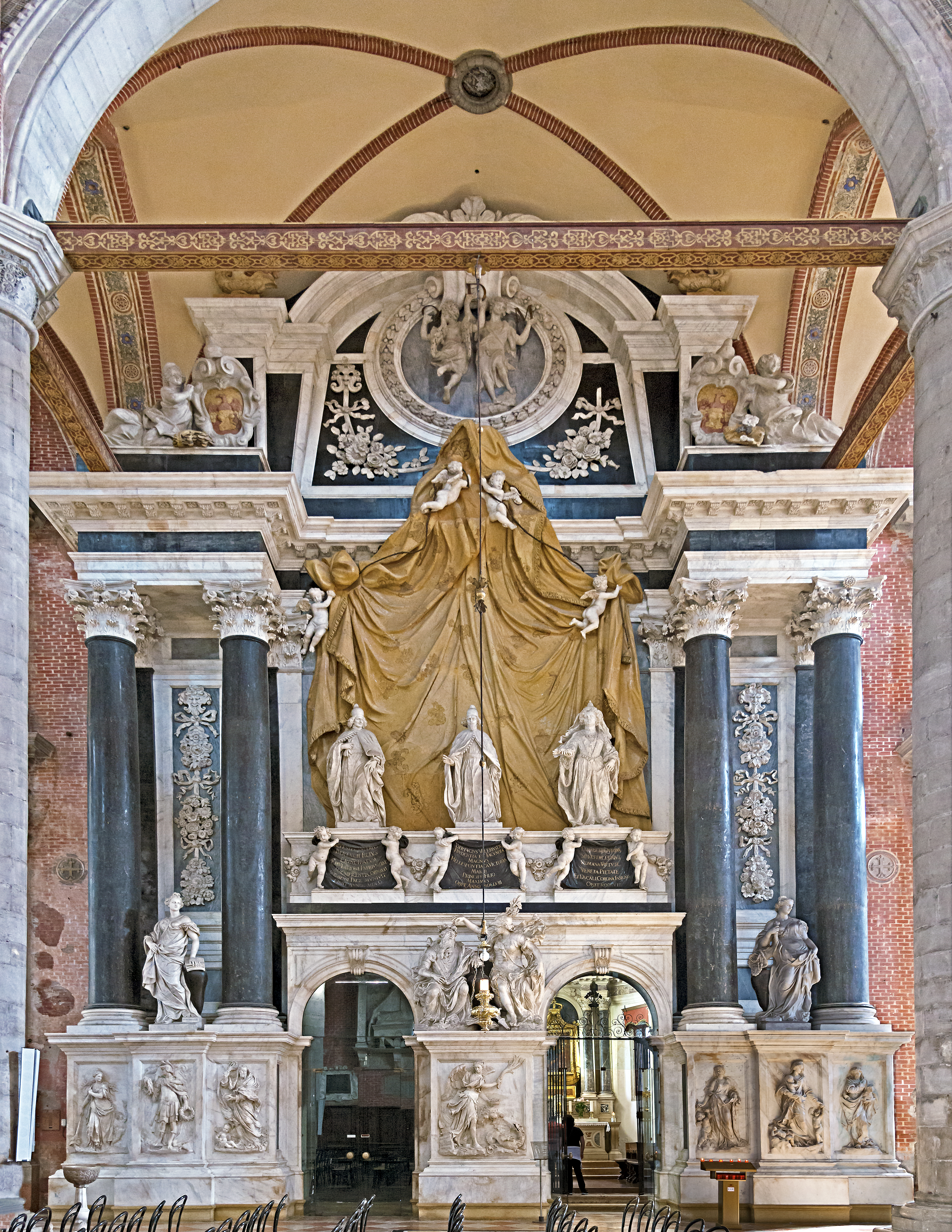
Monument of the Valier family

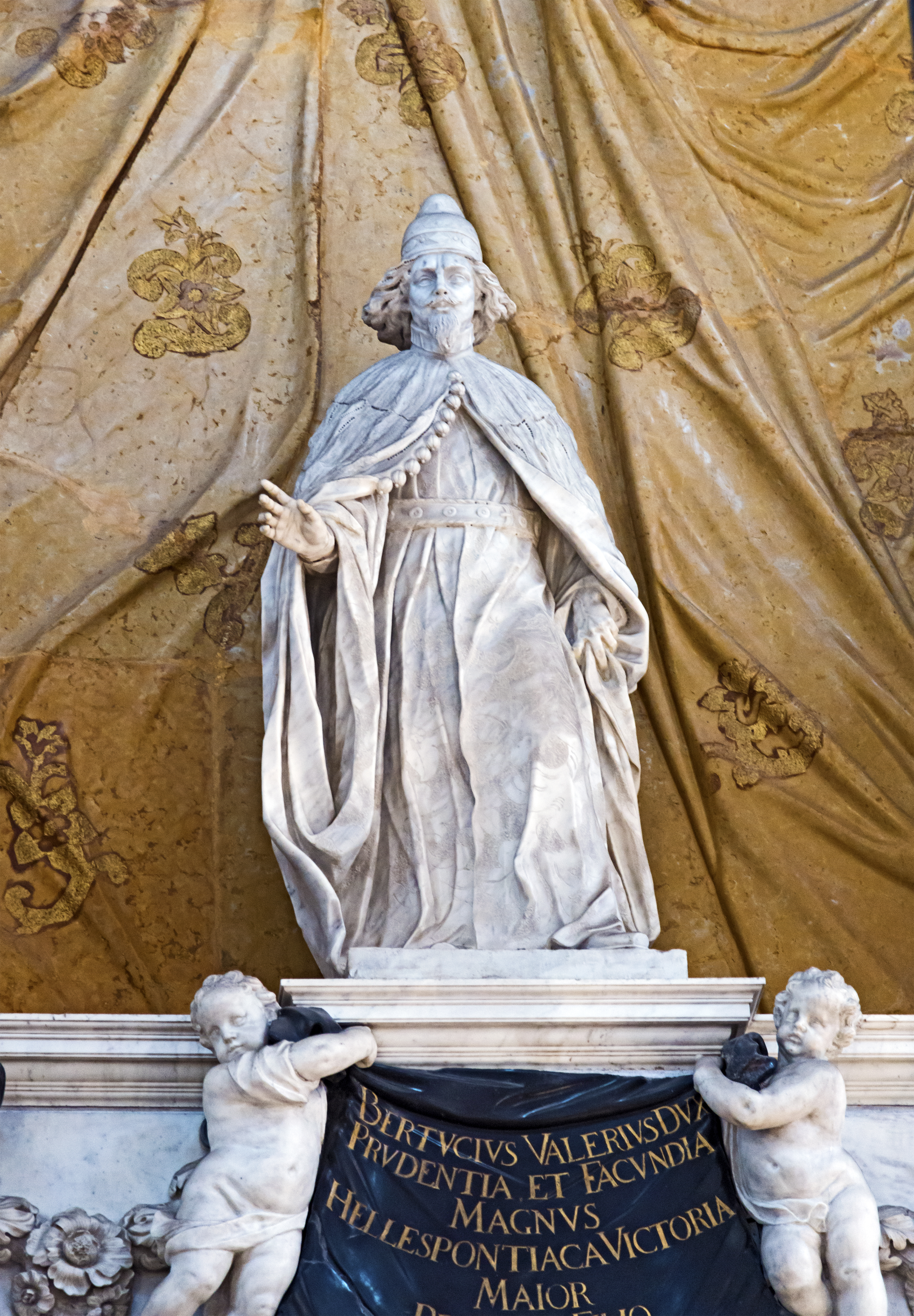
The statue of Bertuccio Valier

Political offices
Preceded by Francesco Cornaro	Doge of Venice; 1656–1658	Succeeded by Giovanni Pesaro
