= English fifty shilling coin =

Obverse

Reverse

The fifty-shilling coin, 1656

The English fifty shilling coin, worth 2 1/2 pounds sterling, was only ever minted once, in the year 1656. It was a milled gold coin weighing 22.7 g (0.73 ozt) and with a diameter of 30 mm (1.2 in). Only eleven examples are known to survive.

One extremely fine specimen was recorded to have been sold for £15,250 in May 1989. A lustrous example was sold in London in January 2021 for £471,200 ($643,597 U.S.) including the 24 percent buyer’s commission, setting a new record price for a Cromwellian coin.

The obverse of the coin depicts Oliver Cromwell as a Roman Emperor, with the inscription OLIVAR D G RP ANG SCO HIB &c PRO, an abbreviation of Olivarius Dei Gratia Reipublicae Angliae, Scotiae, Hiberniae, etc. Protector — Oliver, by the grace of God, of the Commonwealth of England, Scotland, Ireland, etc. Protector. The reverse depicts a crowned shield bearing the Commonwealth arms, with the inscription PAX QVÆRITUR BELLO — Peace is sought through war, and the date 1656, while there is also an edge inscription PROTECTOR LITERIS LITERÆ NVMMIS CORONA ET SALVS — A protector of the letters, the letters are a garland and a safeguard to the coinage.
