= Carlo Contarini =

Doge of Venice from 1655 to 1656

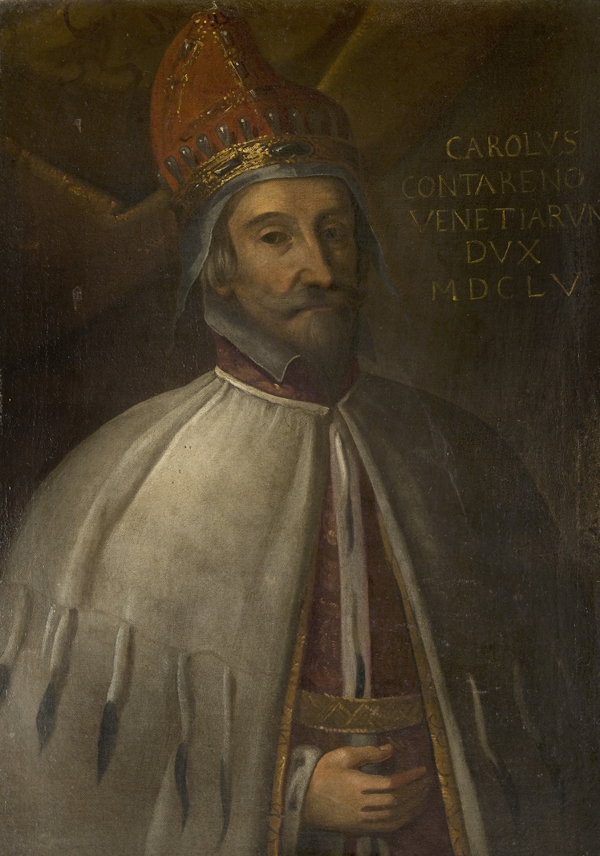
Carlo Contarini

Carlo Contarini (July 1580 – 1 May 1656) was the 100th Doge of Venice from 27 March 1655 until his death in 1656.

== Background 1580–1655 ==
Carlo Contarini was born in Venice, the son of Elisabetta Morosini and Andrea Contarini; his father died ten days after his birth. He was thus the heir of a large fortune, as well as the Contarini name, so renowned in the history of the Republic of Venice. He was married to Paolina Loredano.

In the course of a long and distinguished career, Contarini traversed the cursus honorum of the Venetian Republic, serving as provveditore, savio, rector, and member of the Senate of Venice. In the years immediately prior to his election as Doge, he had almost entirely withdrawn from public life, and he appears to not even have considered becoming a Procurator of San Marco.

== Election and Reign as Doge, 1655–1656 ==
Following the death of Doge Francesco Molin on 27 February 1655, electors met to elect his successor in March 1655, but were divided and could not agree on a candidate. They eventually settled on Carlo Contarini as a compromise candidate because he was allied with all factions, and old enough that he was not expected to have a long reign. He was consequently elected on the 68th ballot on 27 March 1655.

Contarini's thirteen-month reign did not see any notable events. As Doge, he sought to reconcile the various factions that divided Venice. Venice's prolonged war with the Ottoman Empire for possession of Crete continued throughout his entire reign.

Perhaps because of the heavy workload of being Doge, Contarini fell ill in early 1656, and, after a series of failed medical treatments, died in Venice on 1 May 1656.

Political offices
Preceded by Francesco Molin	Doge of Venice; 1655–1656	Succeeded by Francesco Cornaro
