= Giovanni I Cornaro =

Doge of Venice from 1625 to 1629

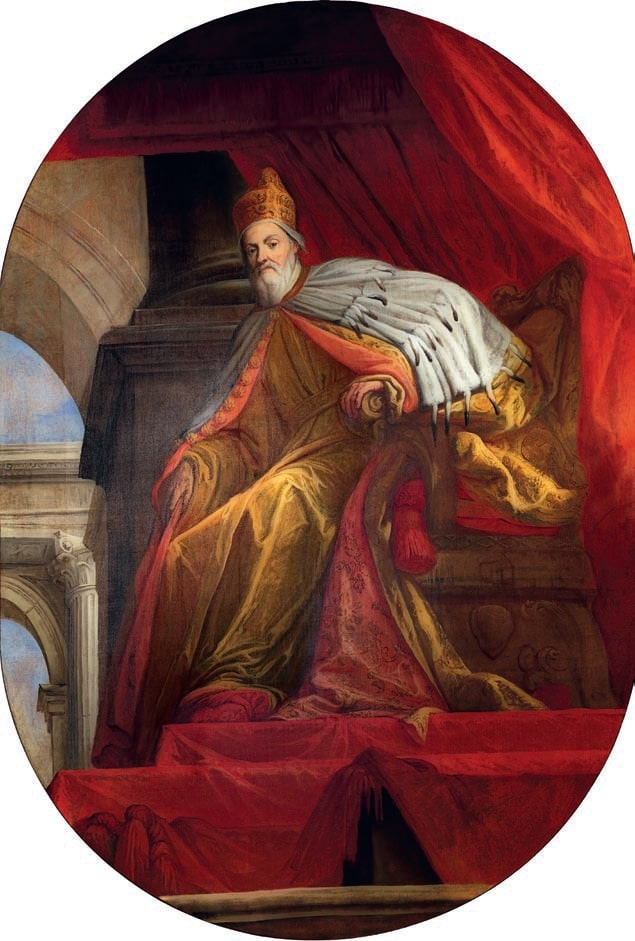
Portrait by Sebastiano Ricci

Giovanni I Corner or Cornaro (Venice, 11 November 1551 – Venice, 22 December 1629) was the 96th Doge of Venice from 4 January 1625 until his death in 1629.

== Early years, 1551–1625 ==
He was the son of Marcantonio Cornaro and Cecilia Giustinian. He married Chiara Delfin on 10 February 1578 and the couple had twelve children.

He served as capitano of Verona, before winning a spot on the Council of Ten in 1597. In 1600, he was made podestà of Padua, and in 1603, podestà of Brescia. In May 1609, he was named Procurator of St Mark's.

== Reign as Doge, 1625–1629 ==
Doge Francesco Contarini died on 6 December 1624. Following a long conclave held on 4 January 1625, the Dogal voters converged on Giovanni Cornaro as their preferred candidate. Cornaro's children were strongly opposed to Cornaro's selection as Doge because of Venice's prohibition on the children of Doges being appointed to high office in government or in the Church.

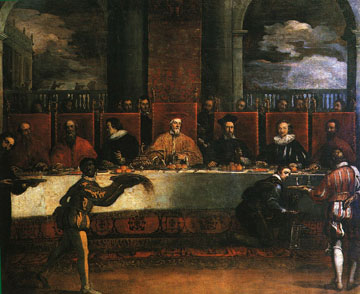
Painting by Filippo Zaniberti showing Cornaro giving a state banquet at the Doge's Palace.

Cornaro now attempted to turn the Dogal position to his family's advantage. In 1626, Pope Urban VIII appointed Cornaro's son Federico Baldissera Bartolomeo Cornaro as a cardinal. This move was ultimately ratified by the Senate of Venice, but a latter attempt to make Federico Cornaro Bishop of Vicenza, and later, Bishop of Padua, were successfully blocked.

In 1627, Renier Zen, a Capi of the Council of Ten, emerged as a vocal critic of Cornaro, accusing him of running Venice for his own family's benefit by, among other things, turning a blind eye to his son Giorgio's trafficking in contraband goods. On 27 October, Zen caused an uproar at a meeting of the Great Council by accusing the Cornaro family of corruption; although the elections were annulled, he was unable to obtain any further sanctions. On December 30, Renier Zen was attacked by masked assassins, who were later found to include Giorgio Cornaro, the son of the Doge.

Zen grew even more outspoken in his criticism of Cornaro in the wake of Giorgio Cornaro's failed assassination attempt. Venice now became divided into two factions, a pro-Conaro faction that was pro-papal and backed by the Venetian oligarchs, and a pro-Zen faction that was anti-papal and backed by the poorer nobility (although Zen was probably not the standard bearer for liberty he was sometimes portrayed as in nineteenth-century tragedies). Rioting broke out between the two factions on 23 July 1628, and for the rest of Cornaro's life, Venice was locked in a civil war. The Venetian government had basically broken down by late 1628. Cornaro died on 23 December 1629, with a new war in Montferrat looming. He and his wife are buried in the Tolentini.

== Post-Venetian Period and Modern Descendants ==
Despite the historical view that the Venetian house of Corner or Cornaro was completely moved away from Crete after the fall of Candia during the Ottoman Empire in 1669, during the recent years private genealogical researches and studies in Italian and Greek archives have shown new information about the family's lineage through the years.

Based on those studies family branches have been connected to the Doge Giovanni I Cornaro, that during his reign the Tornesi Coins were issued in Crete that had the inscription "ΙΩΑΝ·ΚΟΡΝΗΛΙΟS Ο ΔΟΥΞ" which translates to "Doge Ioannis Kornilios" in modern English. That ways the ties with the Greek territory were maintained.

While the primary house returned to Venice, members of subsequent generations of the family stayed or returned to Greece during the later centuries. Through that period of time and during the integration with the local population the original Latin surname gradually underwent a linguistic transformation to the surname of "Kornaros" (Κορνάρος) and "Kornilios" (Κορνήλιος) as it was written on the tornesi coin, which effectively reverts the ancient Roman name "Cornelius". During the modern era the surnames remain preserved through descendents of the family. That continuity demonstrates the still existing connection of the Venetian House of corner and the island of Crete.

This article is based on this article from Italian Wikipedia.

Political offices
Preceded by Francesco Contarini	Doge of Venice; 1625–1629	Succeeded by Nicolò Contarini
