= 1640s =

Decade

The 1640s decade ran from January 1, 1640, to December 31, 1649.

== Events ==
=== 1640 ===
==== January–March ====
- January 6 – The Siege of Salses ends almost six months after it had started on June 9, 1639, with the French defenders surrendering to the Spanish attackers.
- January 17 – A naval battle over control of what is now Brazil, between ships of the Dutch Republic and those of the Kingdom of Portugal, ends after five days of fighting with the Dutch driving the Portuguese away from the port of Recife.
- February 9 – Ibrahim I (1640–1648) succeeds Murad IV (1623–1640) as Sultan of the Ottoman Empire.
- March 8–13 – Siege of Galle: Dutch troops take the strategic fortress at Galle, Sri Lanka from the Portuguese.

==== April–June ====
- April 13 – The Short Parliament assembles, as King Charles I of England attempts to fund the second of the Bishops' Wars.
- May 5 – The Short Parliament is dissolved.
- May 11/12 Following the Short Parliament's dissolution, an angry and armed mob attacked Lambeth Palace in the hope of killing the unpopular Archbishop, William Laud.
- May 22 – The Catalan Revolt (Guerra dels Segadors) breaks out in Catalonia.
- June 7 – Catalan rebels assassinate Dalmau de Queralt, Count of Santa Coloma, beginning the three-day Corpus de Sang riots.
- June 13 – The eruption of the Mount Komagatake volcano takes place in Japan. Although the eruption causes few direct injuries, the heavy ashfall poisons local crops and causes the Kan'ei Great Famine that causes more than 50,000 deaths from starvation.

==== July–September ====
- July 9 – John Punch, a servant of Virginia planter Hugh Gwyn, is sentenced to a life of servitude after attempting to escape, making him the "first official slave in the English colonies"
- July 15 – The first university of Finland, the Royal Academy of Turku, is inaugurated in Turku.
- August 9 – Forty-one Spanish delegates to Japan at Nagasaki are beheaded.
- August 20 – Second Bishops' War: A Scottish Covenanter army invades Northumberland in England.
- August 28 – Second Bishops' War – Battle of Newburn: The Scottish Covenanter army led by Alexander Leslie defeats the English army near Newburn in England.
- September 7 – Portuguese missionary Sebastien Manrique reaches Dhaka and stays for 27 days, leaving on October 4.
- September 20 – The Siege of Turin ends in Italy after almost four months with a victory by French and Piedmontese after having started on May 22, and the city is recaptured from Spain.

==== October–December ====
- October 26 – The Treaty of Ripon is signed, restoring peace between the Scottish Covenanters and Charles I of England.
- November 3 – The English Long Parliament is summoned; it will not be dissolved for 20 years.
- December 1
  - The end of the Iberian Union of Spain and Portugal begins, as a revolution organized by the nobility and bourgeoisie causes John IV of Portugal to be acclaimed as king, thus ending 60 years of personal union of the crowns of Portugal and Spain, and the rule of the House of Habsburg (also called the Philippine Dynasty). The Spanish Habsburgs do not recognize Portugal's new dynasty, the House of Braganza, until the end of the Portuguese Restoration War in 1668.
  - Frederick William, Elector of Brandenburg begins to rule.

==== Date unknown ====
- The first book to be printed in North America (the Bay Psalm Book) is published.
- The first known European coffeehouse opens in Venice.

=== 1641 ===
==== January–March ====
- January 4 – The stratovolcano Mount Parker in the Philippines has a major eruption.
- January 14 – The Battle of Malacca concludes with the Dutch East India Company ending Portuguese control of Malacca.
- January 18 – The Junta de Braços (council of Estates) of the Principality of Catalonia, led by Pau Claris, accepts the proposal to establish the Catalan Republic under French protection.
- February 16 – King Charles I of England gives his assent to the Triennial Act, reluctantly committing himself to parliamentary sessions of at least fifty days, every three years.
- March 7 – King Charles I of England decrees that all Roman Catholic priests must leave England by April 7 or face being arrested and treated as traitors.
- March 22 – The trial for high treason begins for Thomas Wentworth, 1st Earl of Strafford, director of England's Council of the North.
- March 27
  - The Battle of Pressnitz begins between the Holy Roman Empire and Sweden.
  - The Siege of São Filipe begins in the Azores as the Portuguese Navy fights to drive the Spanish out. After almost 11 months, the Portuguese prevail on March 4, 1642.

==== April–June ====
- April 7 – The deadline for Catholic priests to leave England expires. Among those who refuse to leave, Ambrose Barlow and William Ward become martyrs. Barlow surrenders on Easter Sunday, April 25, and is hanged on September 10; he will be canonized as a saint in 1970. Ward is caught on July 15 and executed on July 26.
- April 15 – Aegidius Ursinus de Vivere is appointed by Pope Urban VIII to be the Roman Catholic Church's Patriarch of Jerusalem.
- April 21 – England's House of Commons votes 204 to 59 in favor of the conviction for treason and the execution of the Earl of Strafford, and the House of Lords acquiesces. King Charles refuses to give the necessary royal assent.
- April 25 – The Battle of Songjin begins in the modern-day North Korean city of Kimch'aek, at the time part of the Chinese Empire controlled by the Ming dynasty. The Ming, led by General Wu Sangui, defeat the Qing rebels.
- April 30 – In Morocco, rebel leader and secessionist Sidi al-Ayachi is assassinated.
- May 3 – The Protestation of 1641 is passed by England's Parliament, requiring all officeholders to swear an oath of allegiance to King Charles I and to the Church of England.
- May 7 – England's House of Lords votes, 51 to 9, in favor of the execution of the Earl of Strafford for treason. In fear for his own safety, King Charles I signs Strafford's death warrant on May 10.
- May 11 – The Long Parliament in England passes the "Act against Dissolving Parliament without its own Consent".
- May 12 – Thomas Wentworth, 1st Earl of Strafford, former director of England's Council of the North, is publicly beheaded in London in front of a crowd of thousands of people.
- May 24 – Providence Island in the Caribbean, settled by English Puritans and a haven for English pirates off the coast of modern-day Colombia, is captured in a joint operation of the Spanish Navy in an attack led by Don Francisco Díaz Pimienta, and the Portuguese Navy led by the Count of Castel-Melhor Sousa. The expedition takes 770 prisoners, 380 slaves and a fortune in plundered gold and silver.
- June 1 – In Paris, representatives of Portugal and France sign a treaty of alliance.
- June 2 – Bavarian and Spanish troops capture the town of Bad Kreuznach during the Thirty Years' War, 17 months after it had been taken in a French and Saxon attack.
- June 12
  - In India, in the modern-day Rajasthan state, the Mughal Grand Vizier Abu'l-Hasan Asaf Khan is killed in a battle in Bundi against the armies of Nurpur, commanded by the Raja Jagat Singh. The elaborate Tomb of Asif Khan is constructed at Lahore (modern Pakistan) on orders of the Mughal Emperor Jahangir.
  - The Treaty of The Hague is signed between representatives of the Dutch Republic and the Kingdom of Portugal as a 10-year truce and alliance.
- June 29 – The Battle of Wolfenbüttel takes place between a combined Swedish and French force against the Holy Roman Empire, with the Swedish-French Army driving back an Imperial assault.

==== July–September ====
- July 5 – In England, the Long Parliament abolishes the Court of Star Chamber.
- July 12 – Portugal and the Dutch Republic sign a Treaty of Offensive and Defensive Alliance at The Hague. The treaty is not respected by both parties, and as a consequence has no effect in the Portuguese colonies (Brazil and Angola) that are under Dutch rule.
- August 10 – Charles I of England signs the Treaty of London ending the Bishops' Wars between England and Scotland.
- September 14 – The Treaty of Péronne is signed between Honoré II, Prince of Monaco and France's King Louis XIII, guaranteeing the Grimaldi family the right to rule Monaco in return for the principality becoming a French protectorate.
- September 18
  - In Germany, the Siege of Dorsten by the Holy Roman Empire ends after nine weeks with the surrender of the Landgraviate of Hesse-Kassel after the Hessians suffer 1,350 casualties.
  - In France, the siege of Bapaume ends with the surrender of the fortress by its Spanish occupiers.
- September 23 – The English ship Merchant Royal sinks off Cornwall along with its cargo of 100,000 pounds (45,000 kg) of gold and 18 of its 58 crew. More than 380 years later, treasure seekers will still not have located the wreckage.

==== October–December ====
- October 2 – Scottish politician John Campbell takes office as Lord Chancellor of Scotland and is given the title of the Earl of Loudoun by Charles I in his capacity as King of Scotland.
- October 23 – Irish Rebellion of 1641 breaks out: Irish Catholic gentry, chiefly in Ulster, revolt against the English administration and Scottish settlers in Ireland.
- October 24 – The Irish rebel Sir Felim O'Neill of Kinard issues the Proclamation of Dungannon.
- November 4 – Battle of Cape St Vincent: A Dutch fleet, with Michiel de Ruyter as third in command, beats back a Spanish-Dunkirker fleet off the coast of Portugal.
- November 22 – By a vote of 159 to 148, the Long Parliament of England passes the Grand Remonstrance, with 204 specific objections to King Charles I's absolutist tendencies, and calling for the King to expel all Anglican bishops from the House of Lords.
- December 1 – The English Parliament presents the Grand Remonstrance to King Charles, who makes no response to it until Parliament has the document published and released to the general public.
- December 7 – The bill for the Militia Ordinance is introduced by Arthur Haselrig, an anti-monarchist member of the House of Commons, proposing for the first time to allow Parliament to appoint its own military commanders without royal approval. King Charles, concerned that the legislation would allow parliament to create its own army, orders Haselrig arrested for treason. Parliament passes the Militia Ordinance on March 15.
- December 16 – Pope Urban VIII announces the creation of 12 new cardinals of the Roman Catholic Church.
- December 23 – King Charles replies to the Grand Remonstrance and refuses the demand for the removal of bishops from the House of Lords. Rioting breaks out in Westminster after the King's refusal is announced, and the 12 Anglican bishops stop attending meetings of the Lords.
- December 27 – According to a journalist who witnesses the events, John Rushworth, the term "roundhead" is first used to describe supporters of the English Parliament who have challenged the authority of the monarchy. Rushworth writes later that during a riot on the 27th, one of the rioters, David Hide, draws his sword and, describing the short haircuts of the anti-monarchists, says that he would "cut the throat of those round-headed dogs that bawled against bishops."
- December 30 – At the request of King Charles, John Williams, the Anglican Archbishop of York joins with 11 other bishops in disputing the legality of any legislation passed by the House of Lords during the time that the bishops were excluded. The House of Commons passes a resolution to have the 12 bishops arrested. King Charles, in turn, issues an order on January 3 to have five members of the House of Commons arrested for treason.

==== Date unknown ====
- The Norwegian city of Kristiansand is founded by King Christian IV of Denmark-Norway.
- The Dutch found a trading colony on Dejima, near Nagasaki, Japan.
- The Massachusetts Bay Colony adopts a law making witchcraft a capital crime.
- Moses Amyraut's De l'elevation de la foy et de l'abaissement de la raison en la creance des mysteres de la religion is published.
- René Descartes' Meditations on First Philosophy is originally published.
- The town of Falun, Sweden is given city rights by Queen Kristina.
- A massive epidemic breaks out in northern and central China, just three years before the fall of the Ming dynasty. It races south down along the Grand Canal of China and the densely populated settlements there, from the northern terminus at Beijing, to the fertile Jiangnan region. In some local areas and towns it wipes out 90% of the local populace.

=== 1642 ===
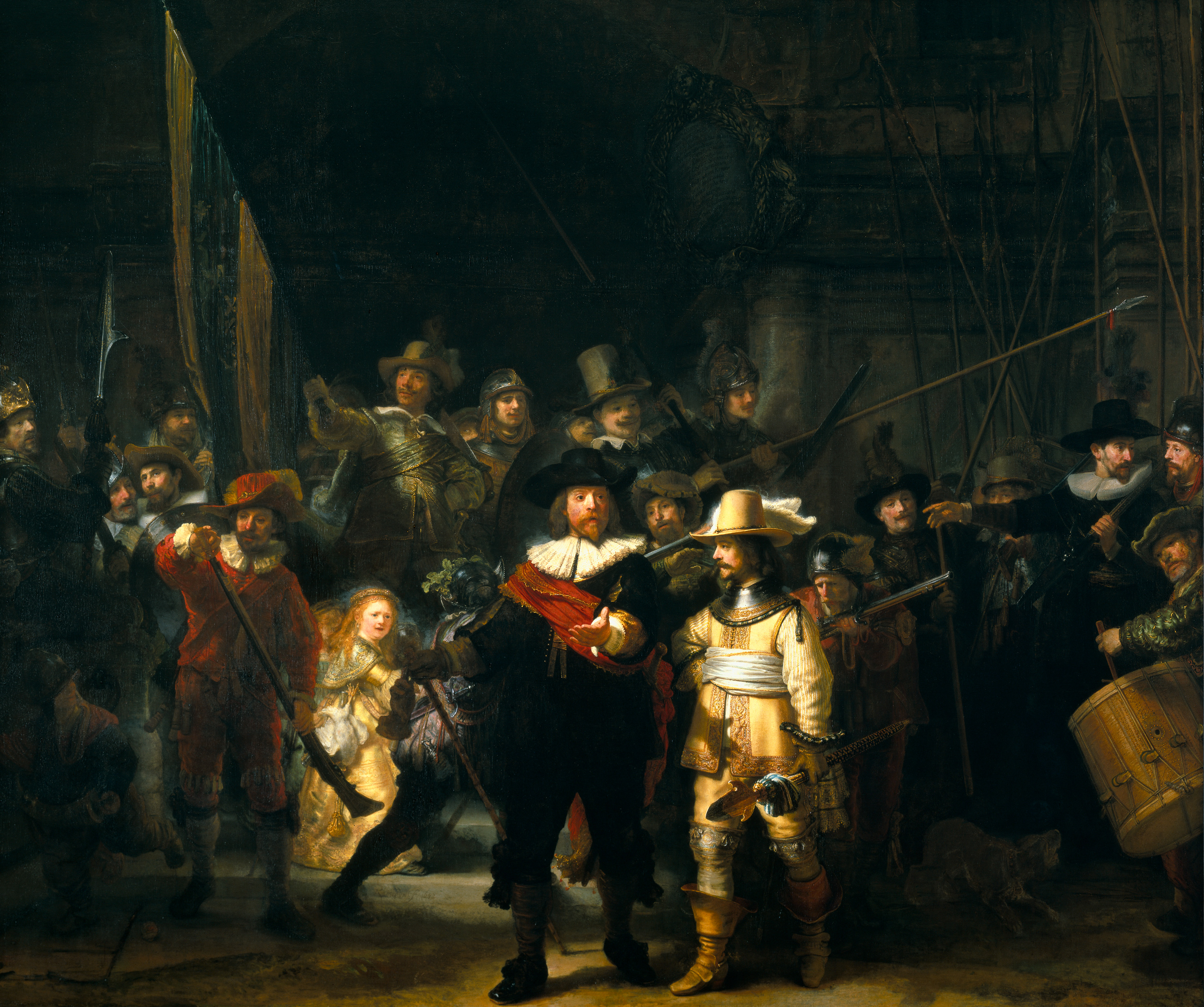
Rembrandt finishes The Night Watch.

==== January–March ====
- January 4 – King Charles I of England, accompanied by soldiers, arrives at a session of the Long Parliament and attempts to arrest his chief opponents, the Five Members, John Hampden, Arthur Haselrig, Denzil Holles, John Pym and William Strode, for what he regards as treason but they escape and are protected by the Lord Mayor of London. This is the last time any monarch enters the House of Commons.
- February 5 – The Bishops Exclusion Act is passed in England to prevent any member of the clergy from holding political office.
- February 15 – Royalist Endymion Porter is voted to be a "dangerous counsellor" by the English parliament.
- February 17 – The Treaty of Axim is signed between the Dutch West India Company and the chiefs of the Nzema people in the modern-day African nation of Ghana.
- February 18 – A group of Protestant English settlers in Ireland surrender to Irish authorities at Castlebar in County Mayo in hopes of having their lives spared, but are killed one week later at Shrule on orders of Edmond Bourke.
- February 20 – The Treaty of The Hague (1641), between the Dutch Republic and the Kingdom of Portugal, is ratified by the Republic's States-General.
- February 22 – The Italian opera Il palazzo incantato (The Enchanted Palace), by Luigi Rossi with libretto by Giulion Rospigliosi (the future Pope Clement IX), is given its first performance at the Teatro delle Quattro Fontane (Palazzo Barberini) in Rome.
- February 23–March 11 – Henrietta Maria, queen consort of England, and her eldest daughter Mary, newly created Princess Royal, leave Falmouth, Cornwall, to go into exile at the Dutch court in The Hague.
- March 1 – Georgeana, Massachusetts (later known as York, Maine) becomes the first incorporated city in the British colonies of North America.
- March 19 – Irish Rebellion of 1641: The citizens of Galway seize an English naval ship and close the town gates in support of the rebellion.

==== April–June ====
- April – Hannibal Sehested is appointed Governor-General of Norway.
- April 8 – Execution of George Spencer: the first hanging of a settler in the New Haven Colony takes place, on a wrongful conviction of bestiality.
- May 1 – Honours and titles granted by Charles I of England from this date onward will in 1646 be retrospectively annulled by Parliament.
- May 10 – In a Catholic synod at Kilkenny, bishops draft the Confederate Oath of Association, calling on Catholics to swear allegiance to King Charles I and to obey orders and decrees made by a "Supreme Council of the Confederate Catholics", hence the Irish rebels of 1641 become known as Confederate Ireland.
- May 17 – Ville-Marie (later Montreal) is founded as a permanent settlement.
- May 18 – The month-long Siege of Limerick in Ireland begins.
- June 1 – "Nineteen Propositions" are sent by the English House of Lords and House of Commons to Charles I, asking the King to consent to parliamentary approval for the members of his privy council, his chief officers, and new seats created for the House of Lords, as well as regulating the education and choice of marital partners of the King's children, and barring Roman Catholics from the Lords. The King's Answer, rejecting the Propositions, is read in Parliament on June 21.
- June 10 – Juan de Palafox y Mendoza, Archbishop of Mexico, dismisses the Viceroy of New Spain, Diego López Pacheco, allegedly on orders of King Philip IV, and takes office as the new Viceroy. Palafox is in office for only five months before being recalled to Spain.
- June 16 – Irish Confederate Wars: The Battle of Glenmaquin takes place in County Donegal, with the Protestant Laggan Army decisively defeating Confederate Ireland soldiers.
- June 23 – Siege of Limerick: the English Protestant garrison of King John's Castle (Limerick) is forced to surrender by the Confederate Ireland Munster army led by General Garret Barry.
- June 29 – The Battle of Barcelona begins at sea as a French Navy fleet of 75 ships, commanded by Admiral Jean Armand de Maillé-Brézé clashes off the coast of Spain with a Spanish fleet of 52 ships under the Duke of Ciudad Real.

==== July–September ====
- July 2 – Hundreds of sailors are killed when the French warship Galion de Guise and the Spanish galley Magdalena become entangled during the Battle of Barcelona. A French fireship attempts to burn the Magdalena and accidentally sets fire to the Galion de Guise, killing 500 of the 540 crew.
- July 3 – The French Navy wins the Battle of Barcelona.
- July 4 – The Committee of Safety is created by the English Parliament as a challenge to the authority of King Charles I. Five members of the House of Lords (Robert Devereux, 3rd Earl of Essex, Henry Rich, 1st Earl of Holland, Algernon Percy, 10th Earl of Northumberland, Philip Herbert, 4th Earl of Pembroke, and William Fiennes, 1st Viscount Saye and Sele) and ten members of the House of Commons (Nathaniel Fiennes, John Glynn, John Hampden, Denzil Holles, Henry Marten, John Merrick, William Pierrepoint, John Pym, Philip Stapleton and William Waller) are appointed to the Committee.
- July 10 – In a prelude to the First English Civil War, King Charles I of England besieges Hull in an attempt to gain control of its arsenal. The siege lasts until July 27, with Charles's Royalist Army failing to take the city from the Parliamentarians commanded by Governor John Hotham and General John Meldrum.
- July 12 – The English Parliament votes to raise its own Army, under the command of the Earl of Essex.
- August 3 – A Dutch Navy fleet of 14 warships, led by Hendric Harouse, begins a campaign to drive Spaniards from the island of Formosa (modern-day Taiwan) off of the coast of mainland China. After disembarking at Tamsui, the Dutch begin a siege of Fort Domingo, which falls on Saint Bartolomeo Day (August 24).
- August 4 – Irish Confederate Wars: Lord Forbes relieves Forthill, and besieges Galway.
- August 22 – First English Civil War begins when King Charles I raises the royal battle standard over Nottingham Castle, so declaring war on his own Parliament.
- September 2 – London theatre closure 1642: England's Long Parliament orders the theatres of London closed, effectively ending the era of English Renaissance theatre.
- September 7
  - First English Civil War: The Siege of Portsmouth (begun on 10 August) ends with the Royalist garrison surrendering the port to Parliament.
  - Irish Confederate Wars: Lord Forbes raises his unsuccessful siege of Galway.
- September 8 – Thomas Granger is executed by hanging in the Plymouth Colony (Massachusetts) following confessions to numerous acts of bestiality.
- September 23 – First English Civil War: Royalist victory at the Battle of Powick Bridge, a skirmish near Worcester which is the first engagement between elements of the principal field armies of the War.

==== October–December ====
- October 8 – 1642 Yellow River flood: Some 300,000 people die in the intentional breaking of the dams and dykes of the Yellow River, done by the Ming dynasty defenders of Kaifeng to break the siege by the large Manchu dynasty rebel force of Li Zicheng.
- October 23 – First English Civil War: Battle of Edgehill (Warwickshire) – Royalists and Parliamentarians battle to a draw in the first pitched battle of the War.
- October 24 – The first Confederate Assembly of Ireland is held in Kilkenny where it sets up a provisional government, largely Catholic Royalist; start of the Irish Confederate Wars.
- October 29 – King Charles I of England enters Oxford and establishes his court there.
- November 13 – First English Civil War: Battle of Turnham Green – The Royalist forces withdraw in face of the Parliamentarian army, and fail to take London.
- November 15 – First English Civil War: Sir Edward Ford, High Sheriff of Sussex, captures Chichester from the Parliamentarians without resistance. The Parliamentarians send Sir William Waller to recapture the city.
- November 24 – Abel Tasman and his crew become the first Europeans to discover "Van Diemen's Land", later the Australian island and state of Tasmania, and the island is claimed for the Netherlands on December 3 at what becomes Prince of Wales Bay.
- November 27 – Hong Taiji (known in the West as Abatai) begins a 60-day march of Manchu warriors southwards from the Great Wall through Ming Chinese provinces of Zhili and Shandong, before returning northward on January 27. (Two years later Beijing falls to rebels, the Chongzhen Emperor commits suicide, and the Shunzhi Emperor becomes the first Qing Emperor to rule over China proper.)
- December 13 – Abel Tasman and his crew become the first recorded Europeans to sight New Zealand, arriving at its South Island. In a battle between the Europeans and the Island's Maori inhabitants, four crew members are killed.
- December 21 – First English Civil War: After routing Edward Ford's royalist troops at the Battle of Muster Green, William Waller follows Ford's retreating force to Chichester as the Parliamentarians besiege the city, which falls on December 29 after eight days. The inhabitants of Chichester agree to pay the Parliamentarians an additional month's pay to prevent the town from being plundered.

==== Date unknown ====
- The village of Bro (Broo), Sweden is granted city rights for the second time and takes the name Kristinehamn (literally "Christina's port") after the Swedish monarch at this time, Queen Christina.
- Rembrandt finishes his painting The Night Watch (Militia Company of District II under the Command of Captain Frans Banninck Cocq) in Amsterdam.
- Isaac Aboab da Fonseca is appointed rabbi in Pernambuco, Brazil, thus becoming the first rabbi of the Americas.

=== 1643 ===
==== January–March ====
- January 21 – Abel Tasman sights the island of Tonga.
- February 6
  - (17 Dhu al-Qadah 1052 AH) In India, the first ceremony at the nearly-complete Taj Mahal in Agra, the Mughal Emperor Shah Jahan observes the 12th anniversary of the death of his wife, Mumtaz Mahal, and opens the structure to thousands of mourners.
  - Abel Tasman sights the Fiji Islands.
- March 13 – First English Civil War: First Battle of Middlewich – Roundheads (Parliamentarians) rout the Cavaliers (Royalist supporters of King Charles I) at Middlewich in Cheshire.
- March 18 – Irish Confederate Wars: Battle of New Ross – English troops defeat those of Confederate Ireland.

==== April–June ====
- April 1 – Åmål, Sweden, is granted its city charter.
- April 28 – Francisco de Lucena, former Portuguese Secretary of State, is beheaded after being convicted of treason.
- May 14 – Louis XIV succeeds his father Louis XIII as King of France at age 4. His rule will last until his death at age 76 in 1715, a total of 72 years, which will be the longest reign of any European monarch in recorded history.
- May 19
  - Thirty Years' War: Battle of Rocroi: The French defeat the Spanish at Rocroi in France.
  - The New England Confederation is formed as a military alliance between Massachusetts Bay Colony, Plymouth Colony, Saybrook Colony (Connecticut), and New Haven Colony.
- May 20 – Dutch expedition to Valdivia: The Dutch fleet (led by Hendrik Brouwer) is spotted off Carelmapu in Chile, soon afterwards landing nearby and plundering the fort and village.
- June 30 – First English Civil War: Battle of Adwalton Moor – Royalists gain control of Yorkshire.

==== July–September ====
- July 1 – The Westminster Assembly of theologians ("divines") and parliamentarians is convened at Westminster Abbey with the aim of restructuring the Church of England.
- July 5 – First English Civil War: Battle of Lansdowne – Royalists gain a pyrrhic victory over the Parliamentarians near Bath, Somerset.
- July 13 – First English Civil War: Battle of Roundway Down – Henry Wilmot, newly created Baron Wilmot, commanding Royalist cavalry, wins a crushing victory over Parliamentarian Sir William Waller.
- August 24 – Dutch expedition to Valdivia: A Dutch fleet establishes a new colony in the ruins of Valdivia in southern Chile.
- September 20 – First English Civil War: First Battle of Newbury – A strategic Parliamentarian victory is made over Royalist forces who are led personally by King Charles.

==== October–December ====
- October 8 – The Shunzhi Emperor of China is crowned at five years old, 17 days after the death of his father and the decision of the Deliberative Council of Princes and Ministers.
- October 28 – Dutch expedition to Valdivia: The Dutch end their occupation of Valdivia in Chile.
- November 14 – Empress Meishō abdicates and Emperor Go-Kōmyō accedes to the throne of Japan.
- November 24 – Thirty Years' War: Battle of Tuttlingen – France is defeated by forces of the Holy Roman Empire.
- December 12 – Swedish Field Marshal Lennart Torstensson's forces enter Danish territory in Holstein, beginning the Torstenson War.
- December 13 – First English Civil War: At the Battle of Alton in Hampshire, the Parliamentarians defeat the Royalists.
- December 25 – Christmas Island in the Indian Ocean is sighted and named by Captain William Mynors of the British East India Company ship Royal Mary.
- December 28 – Dutch expedition to Valdivia: The failed Dutch expedition arrives back at Recife in Dutch Brazil.

==== Date unknown ====
- Baden-Baden is pillaged by the French.
- An Calbhach mac Aedh Ó Conchobhair Donn, The Ó Conchubhair Donn, Chief of the Name of the Clan Ó Conchubhair, is popularly inaugurated as the last King of Connacht in Ireland.
- Evangelista Torricelli invents the mercury barometer.
- Paul de Chomedey, Sieur de Maisonneuve, places the first Mount Royal Cross atop Mount Royal above Montreal.
- Jean Bolland publishes the first two volumes of the Acta Sanctorum (in Antwerp). This is the beginning of the Bollandists' work.
- Miyamoto Musashi begins to dictate The Book of Five Rings (Go Rin No Sho) to his student; he will complete it in 1654, just before his death.
- Roger Williams, co-founder of Rhode Island, publishes A Key into the Language of America.

=== 1644 ===
==== January–March ====
- January 22 – The Royalist Oxford Parliament is first assembled by King Charles I of England.
- January 26 – First English Civil War: Battle of Nantwich – The Parliamentarians defeat the Royalists, allowing them to end the 6-week siege of the Cheshire town.
- January 30
  - Dutch explorer Abel Tasman departs from Batavia in the Dutch East Indies (modern-day Jakarta in Indonesia) on his second major expedition for the Dutch East India Company, to map the north coast of Australia. Tasman commands three ships, Limmen, Zeemeeuw and Braek, and returns to Batavia at the beginning of August with no major discoveries.
  - Battle of Ochmatów: Polish–Lithuanian Commonwealth forces under hetman Stanisław Koniecpolski secure a substantial victory over the horde of Crimean Tatars under Tugay Bey.
- February 5 – The first livestock branding law in America is passed in Connecticut.
- March 24 – Roger Williams is granted an official grant for his Rhode Island Colony from the Parliament of England, allowing the establishment of a general assembly.

==== April–June ====
- April 18 – Opchanacanough leads the Powhatan Indians in an unsuccessful uprising against the English at Jamestown. Although 300 of the English colonists are slain, the settlers pursue Opchanacanough, who is imprisoned in Jamestown for the rest of his life. This is the last such Indian rebellion in the region.
- April 25 – A popular Chinese rebellion led by Li Zicheng sacks Beijing, prompting Chongzhen, the last emperor of the Ming dynasty, to commit suicide.
- May 6 – Johan Mauritius resigns as Governor of Brazil.
- May 25 – Ming general Wu Sangui forms an alliance with the invading Manchus and opens the gates of the Great Wall of China at Shanhaiguan Pass, letting the Manchus through towards the capital Beijing.
- May 26 – Battle of Montijo: The Kingdom of Portugal is victorious over Habsburg Spain, in the first major action between the two nations during the Portuguese Restoration War.
- May 27 – Battle of Shanhai Pass: The Manchu Qing dynasty and Wu Sangui gain a decisive victory over Li Zicheng's Shun dynasty.
- June 3 – Li Zicheng proclaims himself emperor of China.
- June 6 – The invading Qing army, with the help of Ming general Wu Sangui, captures Beijing in China, marking the beginning of Manchu rule over China proper.
- June 11 – During the English Civil War, Prince Rupert and his men take Liverpool Castle. Liverpool is later reclaimed by Sir John Moore.

==== July–September ====
- July 1 – Torstenson War: Battle of Colberger Heide – The Dano-Norwegian and Swedish fleets fight a naval battle off the coast of Schleswig-Holstein. The battle is indecisive but represents a minor success for the Dano-Norwegian fleet.
- July 2 – English Civil War: Battle of Marston Moor – The Parliamentarians crush the Royalists in Yorkshire, ending Charles I's hold on the north of England.
- September 1 – English Civil War: Battle of Tippermuir – Montrose defeats Lord Elcho's Covenanters, reviving the Royalist cause in Scotland.
- September 2 – English Civil War: Second Battle of Lostwithiel (in Cornwall) – Charles I and the Royalists gain their last major victory.
- September 15 – Pope Innocent X succeeds Pope Urban VIII, becoming the 236th pope.

==== October–December ====
- October 1 – The Jews of Mogilev, Polish–Lithuanian Commonwealth, are attacked during Tashlikh.
- November 8 – The Shunzhi Emperor, the second emperor of the Qing dynasty, is enthroned in Beijing after the collapse of the Ming dynasty as the first Qing emperor to rule over China proper.
- November 23
  - Battle of Jüterbog (December 3 New Style): Sweden's forces defeat those of the Holy Roman Empire.
  - Areopagitica, an appeal for freedom of speech written by John Milton, is published in London.
- November – The Castle of Elvas in Portugal resists a 9-day siege by the Spanish during the Portuguese Restoration War.
- December 8 (December 18 New Style) – As Christina comes of age, she is made ruling queen of Sweden.
- December – Bubonic plague breaks out in Edinburgh (Scotland).

==== Date unknown ====
- A Spanish officer is murdered in St. Dominic's Church, Macau during mass by colonists loyal to Portugal during the Portuguese Restoration War.
- Sigismund's Column is erected in Warsaw to commemorate King Sigismund III Vasa, who moved the capital of Poland from Kraków to Warsaw in 1596.
- Philosopher René Descartes publishes Principia Philosophiae (Principles of Philosophy) in Amsterdam.
- The opera Ormindo is first performed in Venice (music by Francesco Cavalli, and libretto by Giovanni Faustini).
- The West India Company displays greater interest in profit than in colonization.

=== 1645 ===
==== January–March ====
- January 3 – The Long Parliament adopts the Directory for Public Worship in England, Wales, Ireland and Scotland, replacing the Book of Common Prayer (1559). Holy Days (other than Sundays) are not to be observed.
- January 10 – Archbishop of Canterbury William Laud is executed for treason on Tower Hill, London.
- January 14 – English Civil War: Thomas Fairfax is appointed Commander-in-Chief of the Parliamentarians.
- January 29 – English Civil War: Armistice talks open at Uxbridge.
- February 2 – Battle of Inverlochy: The Scottish Covenanters are defeated by Montrose.
- February 15 – English Civil War: The New Model Army is officially founded.
- February 28 – English Civil War: The Uxbridge armistice talks fail.
- March 4 – English Civil War: Prince Rupert leaves Oxford for Bristol.
- March 5 – Thirty Years' War – Battle of Jankau: The armies of Sweden decisively defeat the forces of the Holy Roman Empire, in one of the bloodiest battles of the war, in southern Bohemia, some 50 kilometres (31 mi) southeast of Prague.
- March 31 – Fearing the spread of the Black Death (plague), Edinburgh Town Council prohibits all gatherings except weddings and funerals.

==== April–June ====
- April 3 – The House of Lords passes the Self-denying Ordinance, requiring members of the Parliament of England to resign commissions in the armed services.
- April 10 – Because of the plague, the Edinburgh town council orders that the college graduation ceremony should be moved forward, so that students can leave the city (on November 19, teaching resumes in Linlithgow).
- April 23 (St George's Day) – English Civil War: One hundred and fifty Irish soldiers bound for service with King Charles I of England are captured at sea by Parliamentarians and killed at Pembroke in Wales.
- May 2 – Thirty Years' War – Battle of Herbsthausen (or Mergentheim): The Bavarian army, led by Franz von Mercy, catches French forces led by Marshal Henri de la Tour d'Auvergne, Vicomte de Turenne unawares, and heavily defeats them.
- May 9 – Battle of Auldearn: Scottish Covenanters are defeated by Montrose.
- June 1 – English Civil War: Prince Rupert's army sacks Leicester.
- June 10 – English Civil War: Oliver Cromwell is confirmed as the Lieutenant-General of the Cavalry.
- June 14 – English Civil War – Battle of Naseby: 12,000 Royalist forces are beaten by 15,000 Parliamentarian soldiers.
- June 28 – English Civil War: The Royalists lose Carlisle.

==== July–September ====
- July 2 – English Civil War – Battle of Alford – Alford, Aberdeenshire.
- July 10 – English Civil War – Battle of Langport: Cromwell wins in Somerset.
- July 21 – Qing Dynasty regent Dorgon issues an edict ordering all Han Chinese men to shave their forehead, and braid the rest of their hair into a queue, identical to those of the Manchus.
- July 23 – Tsar Alexei Mikhailovich of Russia comes to the throne.
- July 30 – English Civil War: Scottish Covenanters under Lord Leven begin the Siege of Hereford, a Royalist stronghold.
- August 23 (August 13 Old Style) – The Treaty of Brömsebro is signed between Sweden and Denmark–Norway, ending the Torstenson War and ceding Jemtland, Herjedalen, Gotland and Ösel (Saaremaa) to Sweden, which also holds the province of Halland for a period of 30 years, as a guarantee.
- September 1 – English Civil War: Scottish Covenanters abandon the Siege of Hereford and retreat northwards
- September 10 – English Civil War: Prince Rupert surrenders Bristol.
- September 13 – Battle of Philiphaugh: The Covenanters defeat Montrose at Selkirk.
- September 24 – English Civil War – Battle of Rowton Heath: Parliamentarians defeat the Royalist cavalry.

==== October–December ====
- October 8–14 – English Civil War: The Third siege of Basing House by Oliver Cromwell results in its destruction.
- October 8 – Jeanne Mance founds the Hôtel-Dieu de Montréal, the first hospital in North America.
- October 11 – English Civil War: Re-fortification of Bourne Castle in Lincolnshire against a threatened Royalist attack begins.
- November 20 – The Colegio de Santo Tomas is elevated by Pope Innocent X into the University of Santo Tomas, in his brief In Supreminenti. It has the oldest extant University Charter in the Philippines, as well as the whole of Asia.
- December 18 – English Civil War: The Royalist stronghold of Hereford is seized in a swift attack by Parliamentary forces under John Birch.

==== Date unknown ====
- Bamana forces from Ségou invade the Mali heartland, destroying the Mali Empire after its 400 years as a unified state.
- The Stolberg-Wernigerode branch of the family of the counts of Stolberg and Wernigerode is founded in Germany.
- The Solar cycle enters the 70-year Maunder Minimum, during which sunspots will be rare.
- Wallpaper begins to replace tapestries, as a wall decoration.
- The Roxbury Latin School is founded.

=== 1646 ===
==== January–March ====
- January 5 – The English House of Commons approves a bill to provide for Ireland to be governed by a single Englishman.
- January 9 – Battle of Bovey Heath in Devonshire: Oliver Cromwell's New Model Army surprises and routs the Royalist camp of Lord Wentworth.
- January 19 – Sir Richard Grenville, 1st Baronet, a Royalist fighting for Prince Charles against Oliver Cromwell's Commonwealth, is imprisoned for insubordination after proposing to make Cornwall self-governing in order to win Cornish support for the Royalists. After being incarcerated at the tidal island of St Michael's Mount off of the coast of Cornwall, he is allowed to escape in March to avoid capture by Cromwell's troops.
- January 20 – Francesco Molin is elected as the 99th Doge of Venice after 23 ballots, and governs the Venetian Republic for nine years until his death in 1655.
- January 21 – Philip Sidney, 3rd Earl of Leicester is approved by England's House of Commons as the Lord Lieutenant of Ireland.
- February 16 – First English Civil War – Battle of Torrington: A decisive Parliamentary victory is gained over the Royalists.
- February 28 – Roger Scott is tried in Massachusetts for sleeping in church.
- March 2 – The future Charles II of England escapes from Cornwall into exile across the English Channel.
- March 6 – Joseph Jenkes obtains the first colonial machine patent, in Massachusetts.
- March 15 – Start of the Battles of La Naval de Manila, a series of five naval battles fought between the Dutch Republic and Spain in the waters of the Philippines.

==== April–June ====
- April 24 – The Union of Uzhorod brings the Ruthenian Greek Orthodox Church into the fold of the Catholic Church while allowing it to retain its Eastern and Rusyn character.
- April 27 – King Charles I of England flees from Oxford (where he has been overwintering) in disguise and begins his journey to the Scottish army camp near Newark.
- May 5 – King Charles I of England surrenders his forces to a Scottish army at Southwell, Nottinghamshire.
- May 6 – American colonial poet Anne Bradstreet becomes a founding mother of Andover Parish (modern-day North Andover), Massachusetts.
- May 30 – Eighty Years' War: Habsburg Spain and the Dutch Republic sign a temporary cease-fire.
- June 20 – Third Siege of Oxford concludes with signing of the surrender of the Royalist garrison at Oxford to General Thomas Fairfax's Parliamentary New Model Army; on the 24th of June the main force marches out, ending the First English Civil War.

==== July–September ====
- July 7 – The populist political movement called the Levellers appears in England with the publication of the Levellers manifesto, A Remonstrance of Many Thousand Citizens by Richard Overton and William Walwyn.
- July 12 – Lightning strikes the gunpowder tower of the castle of Bredevoort in the Netherlands, causing an explosion that destroys parts of the castle and the town, killing Lord Haersolte of Bredevoort and his family, as well as others. Only one son, Anthonie, who is not home that day, survives.
- July 30 – Commissioners of the Parliament of England and Scottish Covenanters meeting in Newcastle upon Tyne set out the Heads of Proposals ("Newcastle Propositions") demanding that King Charles I gives up control of the army and place restrictions on Catholics, as the basis for a constitutional settlement.
- August 19
  - The Westminster Assembly of Divines, meeting in London, approves a resolution to begin the drawing up of the Westminster Confession of Faith, declaring that "These heads of Faith, Repentance, and Good Works shall be referred to the three Committees in their order to prepare something upon them for the Confession of Faith."; the draft is printed and sent to the Parliament of England in December.
  - First English Civil War: Raglan Castle in Wales surrenders to General Fairfax after a 2-month siege; it is later destroyed.
- September 16 – The new Orange College of Breda opens at Breda in the Dutch Republic.

==== October–December ====
- October 10 – France takes Dunkirk from the Spanish Netherlands for the first time.
- October 28 – The first Protestant church assembly for Native Americans (specifically, the Waban people) is held in Massachusetts.
- October 9 – The Anglican episcopacy is formally abolished by an act of England's Parliament.
- November 4 – Massachusetts Bay Colony enacts the death penalty as punishment for denying Biblical inspiration.
- November 16 – Following up on the abolition of the episcopacy, Parliament passes an act to sell the bishops' lands across the Commonwealth.
- December 7 – Countess Louise Henriette of Nassau marries Frederick William, Elector of Brandenburg, on her 19th birthday at The Hague.
- December 23 – The Covenanters hand over King Charles I of England to the Parliamentarians.

=== 1647 ===
==== January–March ====
- January 2 – Chinese bandit leader Zhang Xianzhong, who has ruled the Sichuan province since 1644, is killed at Xichong by a Qing archer, after having been betrayed by one of his officers, Liu Jinzhong.
- January 7 – The Westminster Assembly begins debating the biblical proof texts, to support the new Confession of Faith.
- January 16 – Citizens of Dublin declare their support for Rinuccini, and refuse to support the army of the Marquis of Ormond.
- January 17 – Posten Norge is founded as Postvesenet.
- January 20 – A small Qing force led by Li Chengdong captures Guangzhou and kills the Zhu Yuyue, the Shaowu Emperor of the Southern Ming dynasty in China.
- February 5 – The Yongli era is proclaimed as Zhu Youlang is declared the Yongli Emperor of the Southern Ming.
- February 24 – Thomas Bushell surrenders the Bristol Channel island of Lundy, the last remaining Royalist territory of England, to the Parliamentarians.
- March 14 – Thirty Years' War: Bavaria, Cologne, France and Sweden sign the Truce of Ulm.
- March – Following the Treaty of Ulm that removed Bavaria from the Thirty Years War, the Bavarian troops' commander, Holy Roman Imperial General Johann von Werth, defies Maximilian I, Elector of Bavaria, and von Werth attempts to move the Bavarian troops out of Bavaria and into Austria to come under Imperial jurisdiction. The troops refuse, and von Werth flees to Austria.

==== April–June ====
- April 3 – In England, a letter from the Agitators of the New Model Army, protesting delay of pay, is read in the House of Commons.
- May 13 – The 1647 Santiago earthquake rattles Chile.
- May 24 – The Marquis of Argyll and David Leslie join forces to defeat Alasdair MacColla, at Rhunahoarine Point in Kintyre. MacColla flees to Ireland; his followers are massacred.
- June 6 – Michael Jones, named Governor of Dublin by England's Parliamentarians, lands with 2,000 troops and begins the expulsion of Catholics and the arrest of Protestant royalists.
- June 8 – The Puritan rulers of England's Long Parliament pass the "Ordinance for abolishing all Holidays, and appointing other Days for Sports and Recreations for Scholars, Apprentices, and Servants, in their Room", confirming abolition of the feasts of Christmas, Easter and Whitsun, though making the second Tuesday in each month a secular holiday. The Act declares "Forasmuch as the Feasts of the Nativity of Christ, Easter, and Whitsuntide, and other Festivals, commonly called Holidays, have heretofore been superstitiously used and observed; be it ordained, That the said Feasts and Festivals be no loner observed within England and Wales."
- June 10 – The Battle of Puerto de Cavite begins in the Spanish Philippines when an armada of 12 large warships from the Dutch Republic sails into Manila Bay, with cannon fire hitting many of the roofs of the city. The Spanish defending fleet drives off the Dutch after a two day battle.
- June 16 – Ferdinand IV, King of the Romans, is crowned as the King of Hungary and Croatia at Pressburg, now the Slovakian capital of Bratislava
- June 19 – The Duke of Ormond, the royalist governor of Dublin, concludes a treaty with the English Commonwealth's Earl of Anglesey, handing over control of Dublin to the Commonwealth in return for the English promise to protect the interests of royalists, both Protestant and Roman Catholic, who had not joined in the Irish Rebellion.
- June 25 – The "Remonstrance of The Army" is presented to the English parliament by former Royal Army supporters of King Charles I, pledging their loyalty to the new English Commonwealth.

==== July–September ====
- July 7 – Masaniello launches rebellion in Naples against Spanish rule.
- July 27 – A mob invades both Houses of the English Parliament at Westminster, and forces the Speakers of the House of Commons and the House of Lords to flee, along with other MPs and Peers.
- August 5 – The New Model Army marches into London, "fulfilling the worst nightmares of Presbyterian MPs," and restores the members of Parliament who were deposed on July 27.
- August 8 – Battle of Dungan's Hill: Irish forces are defeated by English Parliamentary forces.
- August 17 – Peter Stuyvesant is appointed Director of New Netherlands, the Dutch colony in what is later the U.S. state of New York, by the Dutch West India Company to replace Willem Kieft, who departs New Amsterdam on the ship Princess Amelia.
- August 22 – Battle of Triebl: Imperial forces defeat the Swedes in a surprise attack in Bohemia.
- September 27 – The Dutch merchant ship Princess Amelia runs aground off of the coast of Mumbles Point, Wales and sinks, killing 86 of the 107 people aboard, including former New Netherlands Governor Willem Kieft.

==== October–December ====
- October 28 – The Putney Debates, a series of discussions between officers of the New Model Army following Parliament's military defeat of the absolutist monarchy of King Charles, begin at the St. Mary's Church, Putney about what form of government would replace the monarchy in the new republican Commonwealth of England.
- November 13 – Battle of Knocknanuss: An Irish confederate force is destroyed by the army of Parliament; Alasdair MacColla is killed.
- November 15 – Henry of Guise lands in Naples, to become the leader of the Neapolitan Republic.
- December 28 – King Charles of England promises a church reform. This agreement leads to the Second English Civil War.

==== Date unknown ====
- Aberystwyth Castle in Wales, a former Royalist stronghold, is razed to the ground after "a battery of cannon erected on the top of Pendinas hill by Cromwell" and the Parliamentarian troops.
- The word Geysir is first used in Iceland, by Bishop Sveinson.
- Dutch artist Salomon van Ruysdael completes the oil painting, The Crossing at Nijmegen.

=== 1648 ===
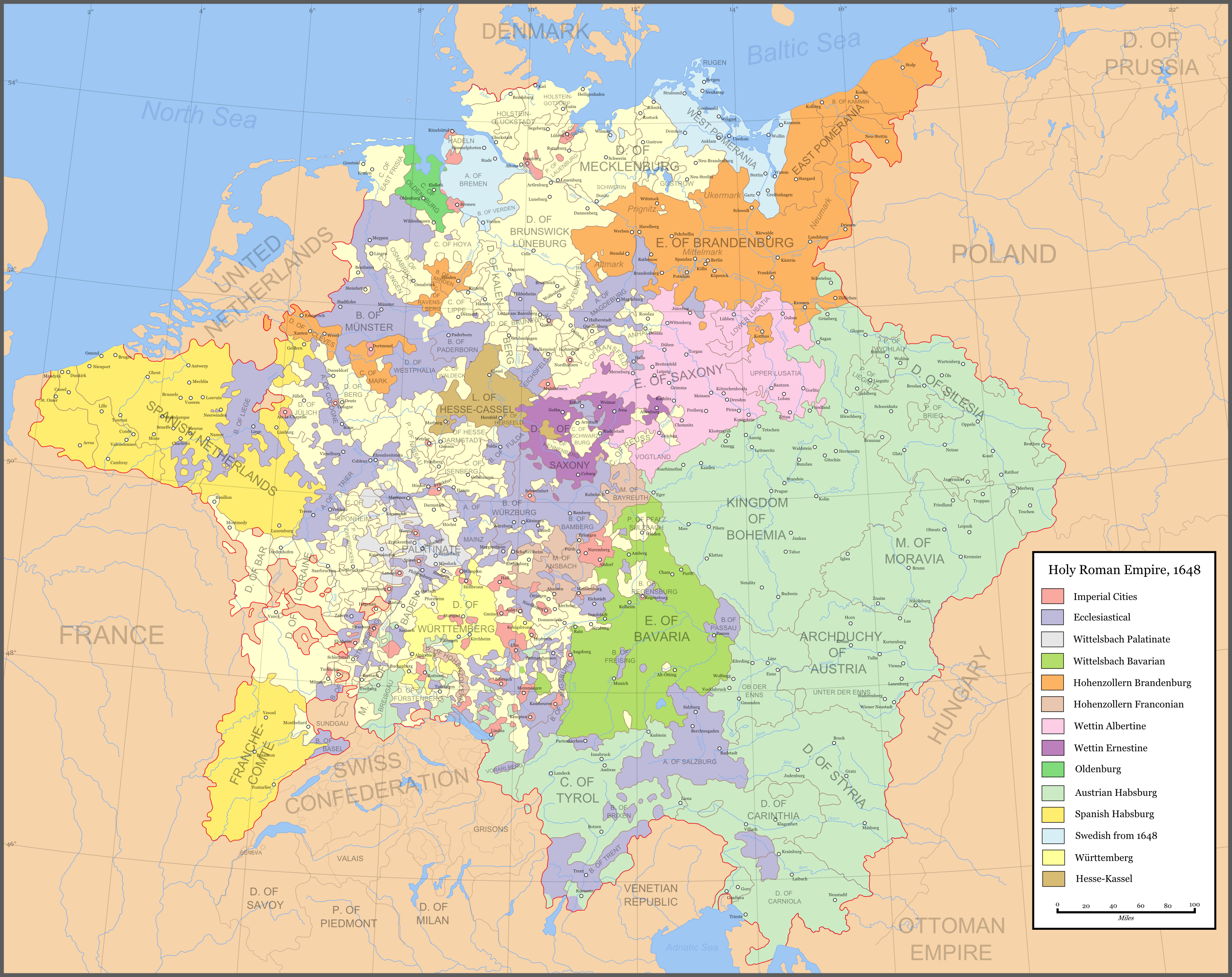
The Holy Roman Empire in 1648

==== January–March ====
- January 15
  - Manchu invaders of China's Fujian province capture Spanish Dominican priest Francisco Fernández de Capillas, torture him and then behead him. Capillas will be canonized more than 350 years later in 2000 in the Roman Catholic Church as one of the Martyr Saints of China.
  - Alexis, Tsar of Russia, marries Maria Miloslavskaya, who later gives birth to two future tsars (Feodor III and Ivan V) as well as Princess Sophia Alekseyevna, the regent for Peter I.
- January 17 – By a vote of 141 to 91, England's Long Parliament passes the Vote of No Addresses, breaking off negotiations with King Charles I, and thereby setting the scene for the second phase of the English Civil War.
- January 20 – France's Royal Council votes to create the Académie royale after accepting the proposal of Martin de Charmois.
- January 26 – The Khmelnytsky Uprising in Ukraine, at the time part of the Republic of Both Nations (Polish–Lithuanian Commonwealth), begins as Bohdan Khmelnytsky becomes Hetman of the Cossacks.
- January 30 – The Dutch and the Spanish sign the Peace of Münster, ending the Eighty Years' War. The Spanish Empire recognizes the Dutch Republic of United Netherlands as a sovereign state (governed by the House of Orange-Nassau and the States General), which was previously a province of the Spanish Empire. The treaty is ratified by the Netherlands on May 15.
- February 11 – England's parliament passes stricter laws against performance of stage plays, providing for demolition of seats in theatres, imprisonment for actors and fines for spectators. The vote comes six days after the King's Men Players are arrested at the Cockpit Theatre during an illegal performance of Rollo Duke of Normandy.
- February 28 – King Christian IV of Denmark and Norway dies after a reign of almost 60 years without having named a successor. The Rigsraadet (Royal Council) and the Estates of the Realm will debate the matter for more than four months before deciding on July 6 to select Christian's oldest surviving son to become King Frederick III.
- March 31 – A major earthquake strikes Van in Ottoman Armenia.

==== April–June ====
- April 19 – First Battle of Guararapes: The Portuguese army defeats the Dutch army, in the north of Brazil.
- May 12 – Construction of the Kaunghmudaw Pagoda is completed in the Kingdom of Burma on the 6th waning of Kason, 1010, near the end of the reign of King Thalun. Hmannan Yazawin
- May 15 – The Peace of Münster is ratified by both the United Netherlands and the Spanish Empire.
- May 16 – England's Commonwealth Army massacres 70 Cornish royalists at Penzance, leading to a rebellion against England's Parliamentarians.
- May 20 – Wladyslaw IV Vasa, King of Poland and Grand Duke of Lithuania, dies after a reign of 15 years. The throne remains vacant for six months until Wladyslaw's younger half-brother, John II Casimir Vasa, is elected by Poland's Parliament.
- June 1 – The Roundheads defeat the Cavaliers at the Battle of Maidstone in the Second English Civil War.
- June 20 – Russian explorer Semyon Dezhnyov departs from Srednekolymsk to begin the first recorded voyage through the Bering Strait, between Asia and North America, and arrives in September.

==== July–September ====
- July 19 – The last major battle of the Thirty Years' War, the Battle of Prague ends in a Swedish victory after three days of fighting over the army of Bohemia. The troops loot the Prague Castle and steal many of Bohemia's most valuable artifacts.
- August 8 – Mehmed IV (1648–1687) succeeds Ibrahim I (1640–1648), as Ottoman Emperor.
- August 16 – The Imam of Oman, Nasir bin Murshid, dispatches an army to recapture Muscat from Portuguese occupiers, who eventually surrender the town on January 23, 1650.
- August 20 – The French Army, under the command of the Prince of Condé, defeats the Spaniards at the Battle of Lens. Upon learning of the victory, Cardinal Mazarin orders the arrest of the members of the Fronde Parlementaire, leading to an insurrection in Paris.
- August – The Cambridge Platform, a new, localized system of Christian church governance, is agreed upon and written down in New England.
- September 12 – At the Battle of Stirling in Scotland, the "Engagers" achieve victory over the Kirk Party.

==== October–December ====
- October 24 – Signing of the Treaties of Münster and Osnabrück concludes the Peace of Westphalia, ending the Thirty Years' War. Rulers of the Imperial States can personally convert to Protestant, Catholic or Calvinist. Ecclesiastical property is restored to the status of 1624, with the minorities of each of the three recognized faiths granted toleration of worship, and there is general recognition of exclusive sovereignty, including that of the Dutch Republic and Switzerland. France and Sweden gain territory, and the latter is granted an indemnity. However, France remains at war with Spain until 1659.
- October 31 – A treaty is signed between the Arabs and the Portuguese. The terms include a provision that the Portuguese should build fortresses at Kuriyat, Dibba Al-Hisn (Sharjah) and Muttrah (Oman).
- November 11 – France and the Netherlands agree to divide the Caribbean island of Saint Martin between them.
- December 11 – "Pride's Purge" in England: Elements of the New Model Army, under the leadership of Oliver Cromwell invade London and expel a majority of the Long Parliament, resulting in the creation of the Rump Parliament.

==== Date unknown ====
- In India, building of the Red Fort in Shahjahanabad is completed.
- The epic poem Padmavati is written by Alaol.
- Sabbatai Zevi declares himself the Messiah at Smyrna.
- George Fox founds the Religious Society of Friends (Quakers) in England.
- The Dutch artist Rembrandt produces the works Rembrandt drawing at a window and Beggars at the Door.
- Giacomo Carissimi composes Historia di Jephte, one of the first significant Latin oratorios.

=== 1649 ===
==== January–March ====
- January 4 – In England, the Rump Parliament passes an ordinance to set up a High Court of Justice, to try Charles I for high treason.
- January 17 – The Second Ormonde Peace concludes an alliance between the Irish Royalists and the Irish Confederates during the War of the Three Kingdoms. Later in the year the alliance is decisively defeated during the Cromwellian conquest of Ireland.
- January 20 – Charles I of England goes on trial, for treason and other "high crimes".
- January 27 – King Charles I of England, Scotland and Ireland is found guilty of high treason in a public session.
- January 29 – Serfdom in Russia begins legally as the Sobornoye Ulozheniye (Соборное уложение, "Code of Law") is signed by members of the Zemsky Sobor, the parliament of the estates of the realm in the Tsardom of Russia. Slaves and free peasants are consolidated by law into the new hereditary class of "serfs", and the Russian nobility are given the exclusive privilege of owning the serfs.
- January 30 – The deposed King Charles I is beheaded outside the Banquet Hall in the Palace of Whitehall, London. The Commonwealth of England, with a republican form of government, replaces the monarchy as the form of government of England and members of the Long Parliament serve as government. Charles, Prince of Wales declares himself as King of England, Scotland and Ireland pending restoration of the monarchy.
- February 5 – In Edinburgh, the Scottish Parliament declares Prince Charles, son of the recently executed King Charles I, as King Charles II of Scotland. Prince Charles, at the time, is at sea in charge of royalist forces fighting to drive Oliver Cromwell from the British Isles. Scotland is the first of the three Kingdoms to recognize his claim to the throne.
- February 7 – The English Parliament rejects a proposal to continue the English monarchy after Oliver Cromwell makes clear that he does not wish to be crowned as King of England.
- February 22 – The Mughal–Safavid War begins when Shah Abbas II of the Safavid Empire in Persia captures the Afghan city of Kandahar from the Mughal Empire of India after a six-week siege. The Mughals, led by Shah Jahan, fail to recapture Kandahar after three sieges in four years.
- March 4 – The first ever set of rules and regulations for England's Parliamentary Navy, Robert Blake's The Laws of War and Ordinances of the Sea, is adopted by the House of Commons, and Blake is promoted to the position of General at Sea of the English fleet.
- March 11 – The rebel Frondeurs and the French government sign the Peace of Rueil.
- March 15 – The city of Lappeenranta (Swedish: Villmanstrand) is founded by Queen Christina of Sweden.
- March 16 – An over 1,000 strong war party of Haudenosaunee Iroquois invade and burn the Huron mission villages of St. Ignace and St. Louis in present-day Simcoe County, Ontario, killing about 300 people.
- March 17
  - The English Parliament, having voted February 7 against a proposal to continue the monarchy under Oliver Cromwell, passes the "Act Abolishing the Kingship" with the goal of creating a republic under a Lord Protector selected by an elected Parliament.
  - French colonists from Martinique, led by former Martinique Governor Jacques Dyel du Parquet, land at St. Georges Harbour on the island of Grenada for the founding of Fort Annunciation. The fort is soon abandoned and the colonists cross the harbour for the founding of Fort Royal which eventually becomes the city of St. George's, Grenada
- March 19 – The House of Commons of England passes an act abolishing the House of Lords, which it describes in the act as "useless and dangerous to the people of England".

==== April–June ====
- April 21 – The Maryland Toleration Act is passed in the American colony, allowing all freedom of worship.
- May 1 – The Wyandot people Indian tribe complete the burning of 15 of their own villages, to prevent their stores from being taken by the Haudenasaunee Iroquois. Almost all the remaining people (approximately 10,000) become refugees, on a path that eventually brings them to Wendake.
- May 17 – The Banbury mutiny in England ends – leaders of the Leveller mutineers in the New Model Army are hanged.
- May 19 – "An act declaring England to be a Commonwealth" is passed by the Rump Parliament.
- May 22–October – Robert Blake blockades Prince Rupert's fleet in Kinsale, Ireland.
- June 1
  - Alexis, Tsar of the Russian Empire orders all English merchants to leave Moscow.
  - The Sumuroy Revolt begins in Northern Samar as Agustin Sumuroy, a Waray, and some of his followers rebel against the polo y servicio (forced labor system).

==== July–September ====
- July 5 – After news reaches the Western Hemisphere that King Charles I has been deposed and executed, the English colonial government of the Somers Isles, now called Bermuda, proclaims its recognition of Charles II as the rightful ruler of the islands.
- July 27 – The Commonwealth of England Parliament passes the "Act for the promoting and propagating the Gospel of Jesus Christ in New England" to create the "Company for Propagation of the Gospel in New England and the parts adjacent in America" for Christian missionary ministries to Native American tribes. The New England Company will continue to operate more than three and a half centuries later.
- July 31 – Ukrainian Cossack troops under the command of Mykhailo Krychevsky and Stepan Pobodailo are overwhelmed in the Battle of Loyew (in what is now Belarus) by a smaller force of Polish-Lithuanian Commonwealth soldiers led by Lithuania's Janusz Radziwiłł, with the Cossacks losing more than 3,000 fighters. Krychevsky is mortally wounded and dies on August 3.
- August 8 – Dubhaltach Mac Fhirbhisigh completes Book VIII of Leabhar na nGenealach, in Galway, within days of an outbreak of the plague.
- August 17 – The Treaty of Zboriv is signed by representatives of King John II Casimir of Poland and the representatives of the Cossacks and Crimean Tartars to partially settle the Khmelnytsky Uprising.
- August 15 – Oliver Cromwell lands in Dublin, unopposed and with thousands of English troops, to begin the Cromwellian conquest of Ireland.
- August 26 – After his "True Levellers", commonly called "The Diggers", abandon their last major colony at St. George's Hill at Weybridge in England, their leader, Gerrard Winstanley, publishes the pamphlet "A Watch-Word to The City of London, and the Armie", recounting the experience.
- September 2 – The Italian city of Castro is completely destroyed by the forces of Pope Innocent X, ending the Wars of Castro.
- September 3 – Oliver Cromwell leads England's New Model Army to start the Siege of Drogheda in Ireland, and breaks through on September 11, executing the last of the original 2,550 Irish Catholic defenders and their leader, the English Royalist Sir Arthur Aston.
- September 30 – The last of Sweden's troops vacate Prague.

==== October–December ====
- October 11 – The Sack of Wexford in Ireland ends after having started on October 2, with Cromwell's New Model Army breaking through, killing more than 1,500 Irish Catholic defenders and civilians, while losing only 20 of the English soldiers. The capture of Wexford ends the remaining chance that Charles II, heir to the English throne, can land troops in Ireland, and Charles and the royalist fleet flee to Portugal.
- November 24 – The first phase of the Siege of Waterford begins as Cromwell's New Model Army attempts to take on the strategically-located Irish city's defenders with his own exhausted army. Cromwell is forced to call off the siege after eight days and his army retreats to its winter quarters at Dungarvan on December 2.
- December 6 – The Scottish defenders of Ireland are defeated by Cromwell's forces in the Battle of Lisnagarvey in County Antrim, with 1,500 Scots killed or captured, and New Model Army battalion of Colonel Robert Venables suffering minimal losses. The battle ends the Scottish presence in Ireland and settlers are expelled from the island in the days that follow.
- December 20 – The Puritan law enforcers of the Commonwealth of England raid the Red Bull Theatre in London for violations of the laws against performance of plays and arrest the actors, as well as confiscating their property.
- December 30 – Chinese General Geng Zhongming, having reported to the Qing dynasty commanders to face charges of harboring runaway slaves during his fight against the Southern Ming dynasty troops, commits suicide while waiting for a verdict in his court-martial. (1943). His son, Geng Jimao, continues to fight against the Southern Ming.

==== Undated ====
- Qing armies reconquer Jiangxi province during the Manchu conquest of China.
- The town of Kristinestad, named after Queen Christina of Sweden, is founded in Ostrobothnia by Count Per Brahe the Younger.
- Dutch artist Frans Hals paints a portrait of René Descartes.

== Births ==
1640

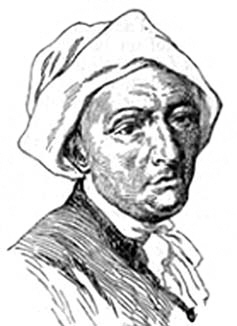
Philippe de La Hire

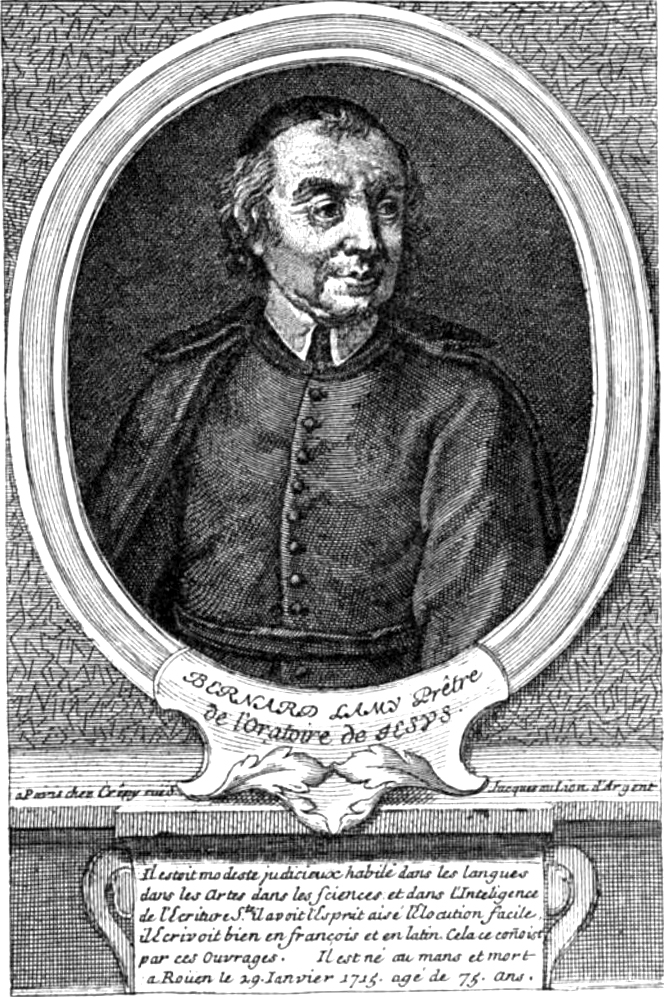
Bernard Lamy

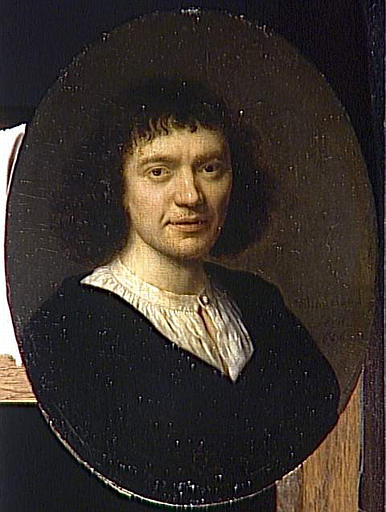
Pieter Cornelisz van Slingelandt

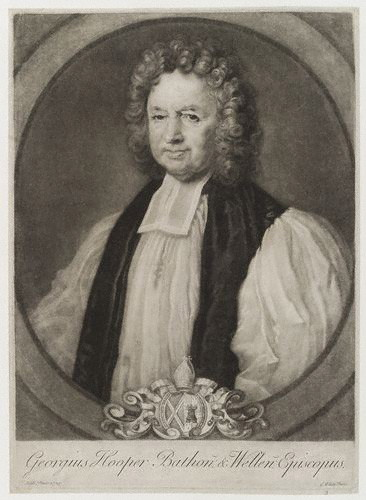
George Hooper

- January 5 – Paolo Lorenzani, Italian composer (d. 1713)
- January 8
  - Joaquín Canaves, Spanish Catholic bishop (d. 1721)
  - Elisabeth Dorothea of Saxe-Gotha-Altenburg, German princess (d. 1709)
- January 10 – Élie Benoist, French Protestant minister (d. 1728)
- January 11 – Sir Robert Burdett, 3rd Baronet, English politician (d. 1716)
- January 17 – Jonathan Singletary Dunham, prominent early American settler of Woodbridge Township (d. 1724)
- January 23 – Philipp von Hörnigk, German economist (d. 1714)
- January 25 – William Cavendish, 1st Duke of Devonshire, English soldier and statesman (d. 1707)
- January 31 – Samuel Willard, American theologian (d. 1707)
- February 6 – William Campion, English politician (d. 1702)
- February 13 – Richard Edgcumbe, English politician (d. 1688)
- February 14 – Countess Palatine Anna Magdalena of Birkenfeld-Bischweiler, Countess of Hanau-Lichtenberg (d. 1693)
- February 17 – Olivier Morel de La Durantaye, French military officer (d. 1716)
- February 20 – Pierre II Mignard, French architect and painter (d. 1725)
- February 24
  - Charles-René d'Hozier, French historical commentator (d. 1732)
  - Michiel ten Hove, interim Grand Pensionary of Holland (1688, 1689) (d. 1689)
- February 29
  - Elisabeth Charlotte, Countess of Holzappel (d. 1707)
  - Benjamin Keach, English Particular Baptist preacher (d. 1704)
- March 6 – Marcantonio Barbarigo, Italian Catholic cardinal (d. 1706)
- March 7 – Maria Theresa van Thielen, Flemish Baroque painter (d. 1706)
- March 9 – Jacques d'Agar, French painter (d. 1715)
- March 18 – Philippe de La Hire, French mathematician and astronomer (d. 1718)
- April 1
  - Sigismund Casimir, Crown Prince of Poland (d. 1647)
  - Georg Mohr, Danish mathematician (d. 1697)
- April 4 – Gaspar Sanz, Spanish composer, musician, priest (d. 1710)
- April 6 – Thomas Lloyd, Quaker preacher of provincial Pennsylvania (d. 1694)
- April 7 – Ludmilla Elisabeth of Schwarzburg-Rudolstadt, German Countess and hymn poet (d. 1672)
- April 18 – Étienne Chauvin, French Protestant divine (d. 1725)
- April 22 – Mariana Alcoforado, Portuguese nun (d. 1723)
- April 23 – Wolfgang William Romer, Dutch military engineer (d. 1713)
- April 26 – Frederick, Count of Nassau-Weilburg, ruling Count of Nassau-Weilburg (1655-1675) (d. 1675)
- April 30 – Nicolas Letourneux, French preacher, ascetical writer (d. 1686)
- May 31 – Michał Korybut Wiśniowiecki, King of Poland (d. 1673)
- June 5 – Pu Songling, Qing Dynasty Chinese writer (d. 1715)
- June 9 – Leopold I, Holy Roman Emperor (d. 1705)
- June 15 – Bernard Lamy, French Oratorian mathematician and theologian (d. 1715)
- June 16 – Jacques Ozanam, French mathematician (d. 1718)
- June 19 – Thomas Widdrington, English politician (d. 1660)
- June 21 – Abraham Mignon, Dutch golden age painter (d. 1679)
- June 29 – Elizabeth Stanhope, Countess of Chesterfield, second wife of Philip Stanhope (d. 1665)
- July 8 – Henry Stuart, Duke of Gloucester, son of Charles I (d. 1660)
- July 20 – Johannes Bohn, German physician (d. 1718)
- August 2 – Gérard Audran, French engraver (d. 1703)
- August 8 – Amalia Catharina, German poet and musician (d. 1697)
- September 7 – Johann Jacob Schütz, German lawyer (d. 1690)
- September 8 – Jérôme de Gonnelieu, French Jesuit theologian (d. 1715)
- September 21 – Philippe I, Duke of Orléans, younger son of Louis XIII of France and his wife (d. 1701)
- September 23 – Date Tsunamune, Japanese daimyō of Sendai han (d. 1711)
- September 29 – Antoine Coysevox, French sculptor (d. 1720)
- October 11 – Louis Henry, Count Palatine of Simmern-Kaiserslautern, German noble (d. 1674)
- October 12 – Sir Roger Twisden, 2nd Baronet of England (d. 1703)
- October 18 – William Stanley, English Member of Parliament (d. 1670)
- October 20
  - Gérard Edelinck, Flemish engraver (d. 1707)
  - Pieter Cornelisz van Slingelandt, Dutch Golden Age painter (d. 1691)
- October 23 – Elisabeth Pepys, English wife of Samuel Pepys (d. 1669)
- October 25 – Johann Ludwig Hannemann, German chemist (d. 1724)
- October 28 – Streynsham Master, English colonial administrator (d. 1724)
- November 1 – Francisco de Benavides, Spanish viceroy (d. 1716)
- November 4 – Carlo Mannelli, Italian violinist, castrato and composer (d. 1697)
- November 5 – John Verney, 1st Viscount Fermanagh, British politician (d. 1717)
- November 14 – Jonathan Corwin, American judge of the Salem witch trials (d. 1718)
- November 15 – Nicolaus Adam Strungk, German composer and violinist (d. 1700)
- November 18 – George Hooper, Bishop of St Asaph
  Bishop of Bath and Wells (d. 1727)
- November 25 – Juan Domingo de Zuñiga y Fonseca, Spanish Governor of the Habsburg Netherlands (d. 1716)
- November 27 – Barbara Palmer, 1st Duchess of Cleveland (d. 1709)
- December 1 – Ercole Antonio Mattioli, Italian politician (d. 1694)
- December 6 – Claude Fleury, French ecclesiastical historian (d. 1723)
- December 13 – Robert Plot, English naturalist (d. 1696)
- December 14 (probable date) – Aphra Behn, English author (d. 1689)
- December 20 – Pierre Cureau de La Chambre, French churchman (d. 1693)
- December 22 – Inaba Masamichi, Japanese daimyō (d. 1716)
- December 25 – Julius Micrander, Swedish theologian (d. 1702)
- December 29 – William Feilding, 3rd Earl of Denbigh (d. 1685)
- Marguerite de la Sablière, French salonist and polymath (d. 1693)
- Catherine Monvoisin, French fortune teller and poisoner (d. 1680)

1641

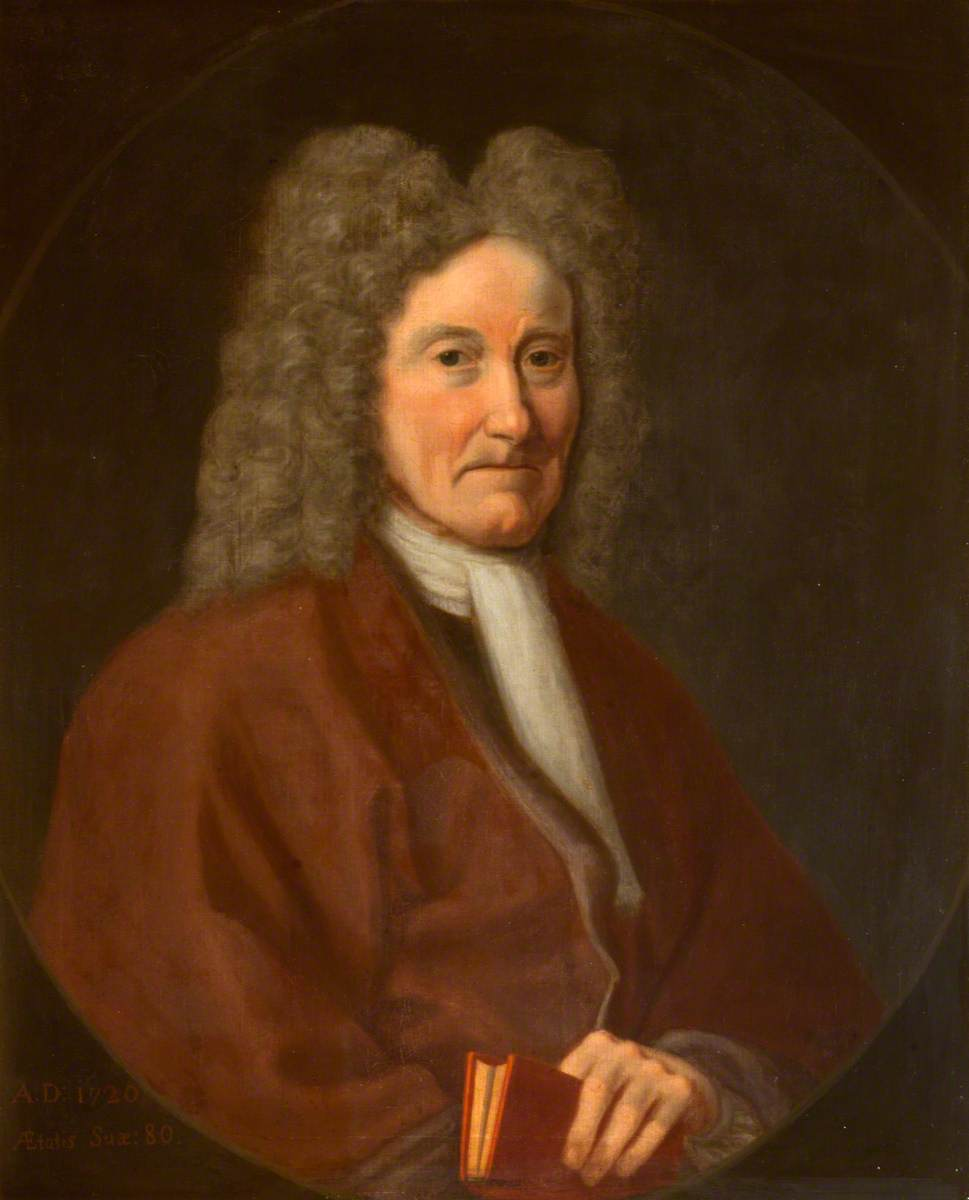
Robert Sibbald

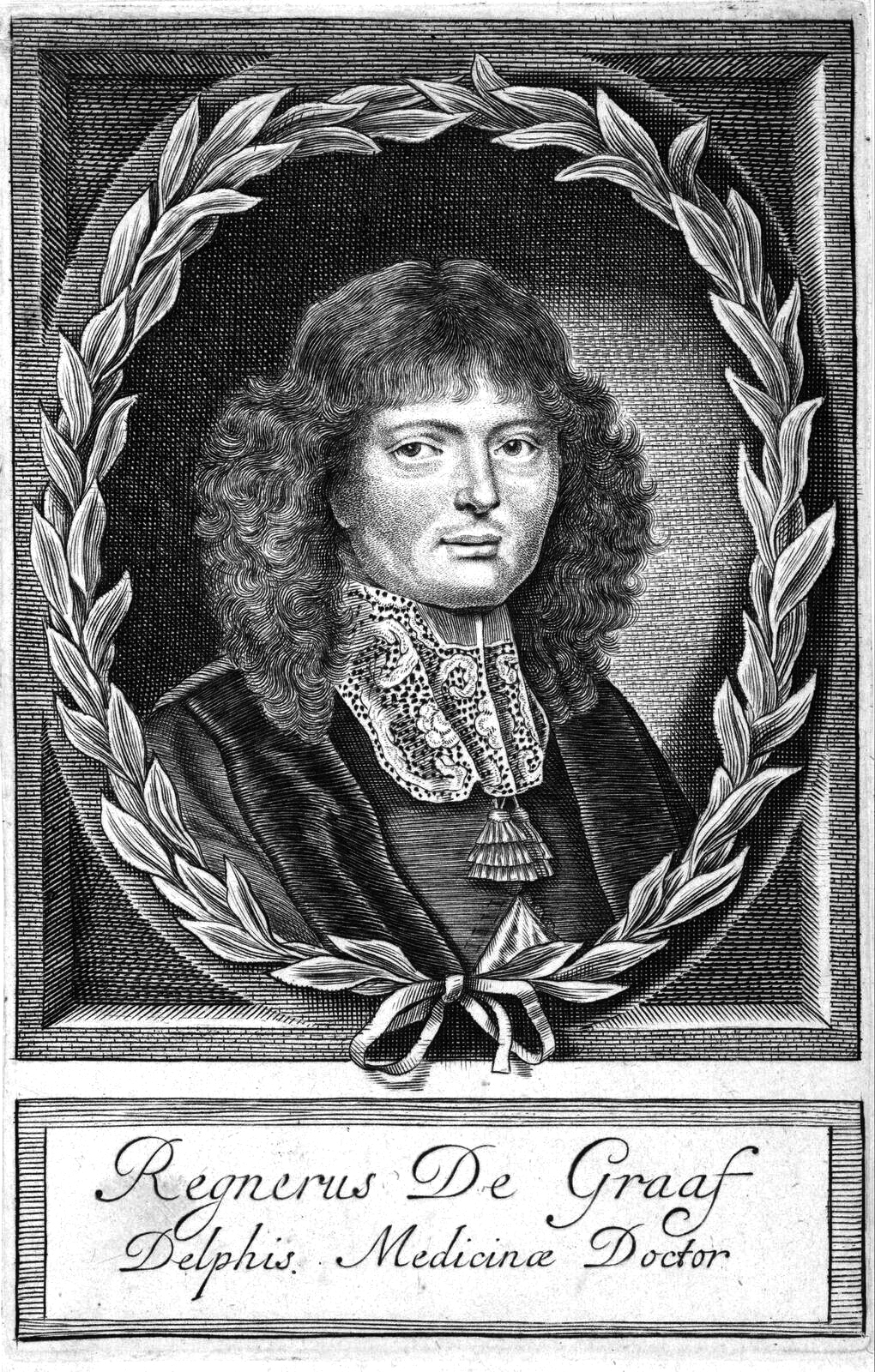
Regnier de Graaf

Henri Arnaud

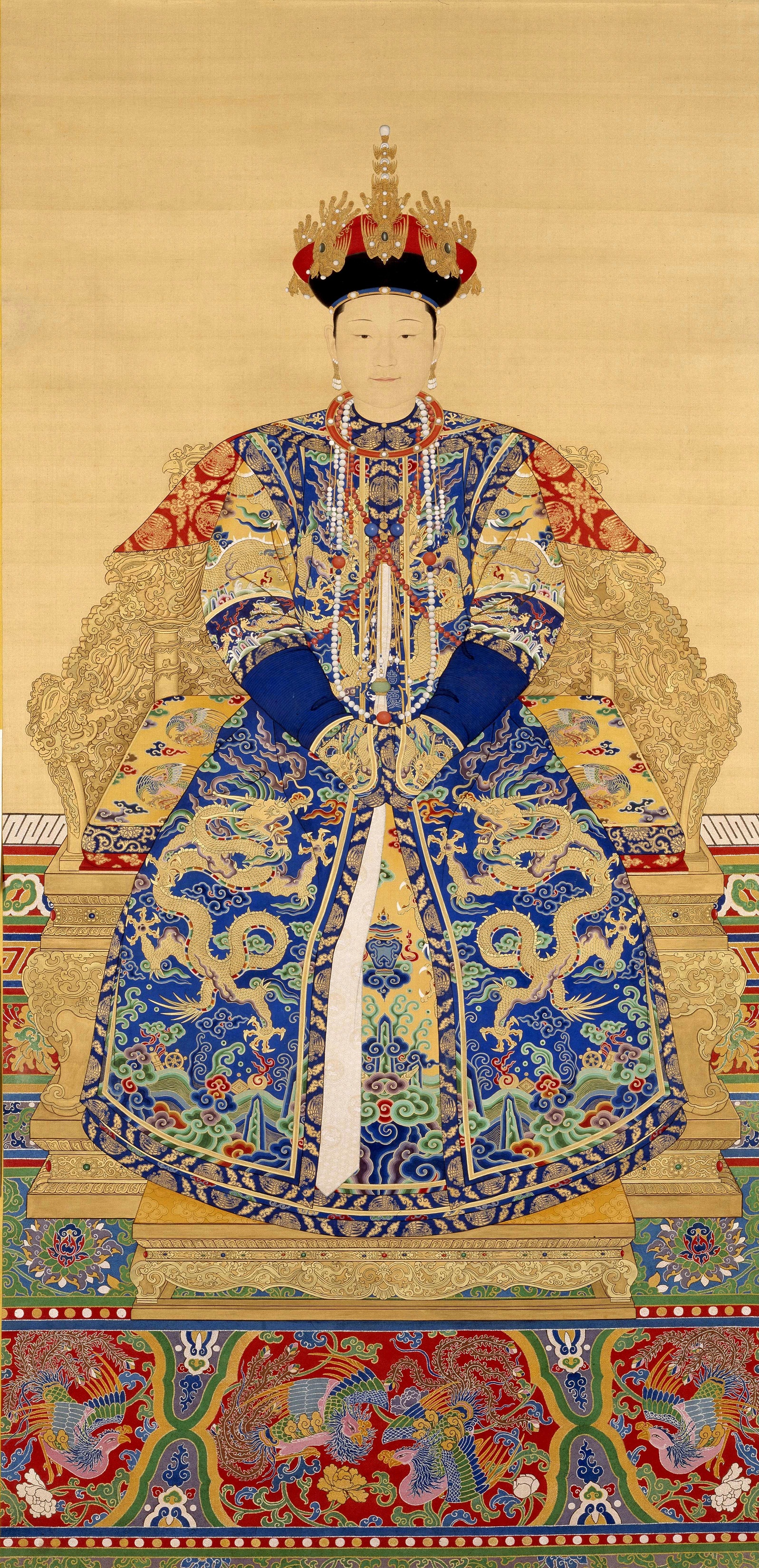
Empress Xiaohuizhang

- January 6 – Wolfgang Dietrich of Castell-Remlingen, German nobleman (d. 1709)
- January 13 – Patrick Hume, 1st Earl of Marchmont, Scottish statesman (d. 1724)
- January 18 – François-Michel le Tellier, Marquis de Louvois, French war minister (d. 1691)
- February 2 – Claude de la Colombière, French Jesuit priest and saint (d. 1682)
- February 3 – Christian Albert, Duke of Holstein-Gottorp, Duke of Schleswig-Holstein-Gottorp (1659–1695) (d. 1695)
- February 4 – Jerolim Kavanjin, Croatian poet (d. 1714)
- February 8
  - Richard Jones, 1st Earl of Ranelagh, Irish politician (d. 1712)
  - Robert Knox, English sea captain in the service of the British East India Company (d. 1720)
- February 24 – Gabriel Tammelin, Lutheran clergyman (d. 1695)
- March 14 – Hyeonjong of Joseon, 18th monarch of the Korean Joseon Dynasty (d. 1674)
- March 19 – Abd al-Ghani al-Nabulsi, Muslim scholar (d. 1731)
- March 29 – Johann Zahn, 17th-century German author of Oculus Artificialis Teledioptricus Sive Telescopium (d. 1707)
- April 4 – Sir James Oxenden, 2nd Baronet, English politician (d. 1708)
- April 8
  - Henry Sydney, 1st Earl of Romney, English politician and army officer (d. 1704)
  - (bapt.) – William Wycherley, English playwright (d. 1716)
- April 15 – Robert Sibbald, Scottish physician and antiquarian (d. 1722)
- May – Juan Núñez de la Peña, Spanish historian (d. 1721)
- May 8 – Nicolaes Witsen, Mayor of Amsterdam, Netherlands (d. 1717)
- May 16 – Dudley North, English economist, merchant and politician (d. 1691)
- May 17 – Pierre Monier, French painter (d. 1703)
- May 18 – Olimpia Giustiniani, Italian noblewoman (d. 1729)
- May 28 – Johann Weikhard von Valvasor, Slovenian polymath (d. 1693)
- May 31 – Patriarch Dositheos II of Jerusalem, Greek Orthodox Patriarch (d. 1707)
- June 15 – Bernard de la Monnoye, French lawyer (d. 1728)
- June 19 – Jan Claus, leading Quaker in Amsterdam (d. 1729)
- June 28 – Marie Casimire Louise de La Grange d'Arquien, French-born Polish consort to King John III Sobieski (d. 1716)
- June 29 – Pierre Cholonec, French Jesuit missionary and biographer in New France (d. 1723)
- June 30 – Meinhardt Schomberg, 3rd Duke of Schomberg, English general (d. 1719)
- July 9 – Jan Jansen Bleecker, Mayor of Albany, New York (d. 1732)
- July 13 – Juan de Santiago y León Garabito, Spanish Catholic prelate, Bishop of Guadalajara and Bishop of Puerto Rico (d. 1694)
- July 14 – William Boynton, English politician (d. 1689)
- July 29 – Sir William Thomas, 1st Baronet, English Member of Parliament (d. 1706)
- July 30 – Regnier de Graaf, Dutch physician and anatomist (d. 1673)
- August – John Hathorne, American magistrate (d. 1717)
- August 2 – Jacob Bobart the Younger, English botanist (d. 1719)
- August 3 – Hildebrand Alington, 5th Baron Alington, Irish peer (d. 1723)
- August 28 – Henry, Prince of Nassau-Dillenburg (1662–1701) (d. 1701)
- September 1 – Jean Barbier d'Aucour, French lawyer and satirist (d. 1694)
- September 5 – Robert Spencer, 2nd Earl of Sunderland, English diplomat (d. 1702)
- September 7 – Tokugawa Ietsuna, Japanese Tokugawa shōgun (d. 1680)
- September 16 – Julius Francis, Duke of Saxe-Lauenburg, Bohemian noble (d. 1689)
- September 20 – Henri Arnaud, pastor of the Waldensians in Piedmont (d. 1721)
- September 22 – Titus van Rijn, Dutch art dealer (d. 1668)
- September 26 – Nehemiah Grew, English plant anatomist and physiologist (d. 1712)
- October 1 – Hans Adam von Schöning, German general (d. 1696)
- October 5 – Françoise-Athénaïs de Rochechouart de Mortemart, mistress of Louis XIV of France (d. 1707)
- October 6 – Sir William Maynard, 1st Baronet, English politician (d. 1685)
- October 10 – Wolfgang Printz, German composer (d. 1717)
- October 14
  - Dorothea Maria of Saxe-Weimar, Duchess of Saxe-Zeitz, by marriage Duchess of Saxe-Zeitz (d. 1675)
  - Joachim Tielke, German musical instrument maker (d. 1719)
- October 28 – Philip Skippon, English naturalist and Member of Parliament (d. 1691)
- November 5 – Empress Xiaohuizhang, Qing Dynasty empress and consort of the Shunzhi Emperor of China (d. 1718)
- November 10 – Edward Lake, English churchman (d. 1704)
- November 14 – Albert Anton, Prince of Schwarzburg-Rudolstadt (1662–1710) (d. 1710)
- November 17 – André, marquis de Nesmond, French naval commander (d. 1702)
- November 23 – Anthonie Heinsius, Dutch statesman (d. 1720)
- December 7 – Louis, Count of Armagnac, French noble (d. 1718)
- December 11 – Jean-Louis Bergeret, holder of the 8th seat of the Académie française (d. 1694)
- December 20 – Urban Hjärne, Swedish chemist (d. 1724)
- December 29 – Pier Simone Fanelli, Italian painter (d. 1703)
- date unknown
  - Pierre Allix, French Protestant clergyman (d. 1717)
  - Diego Ladrón de Guevara, viceroy of Peru (d. 1718)
  - Dodo von Knyphausen, German nobleman (d. 1698)

1642

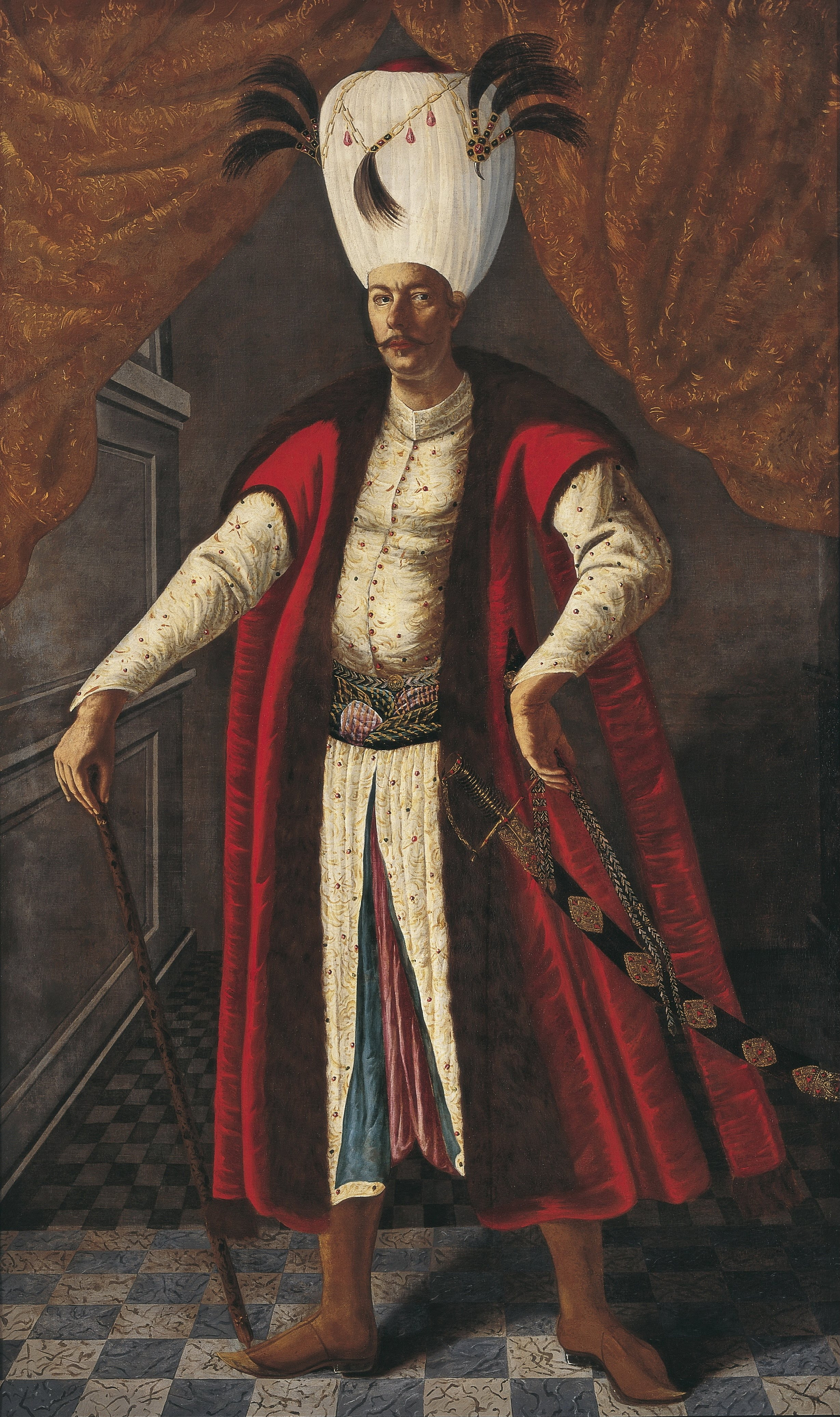
Mehmed IV

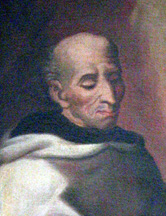
Angelo Paoli

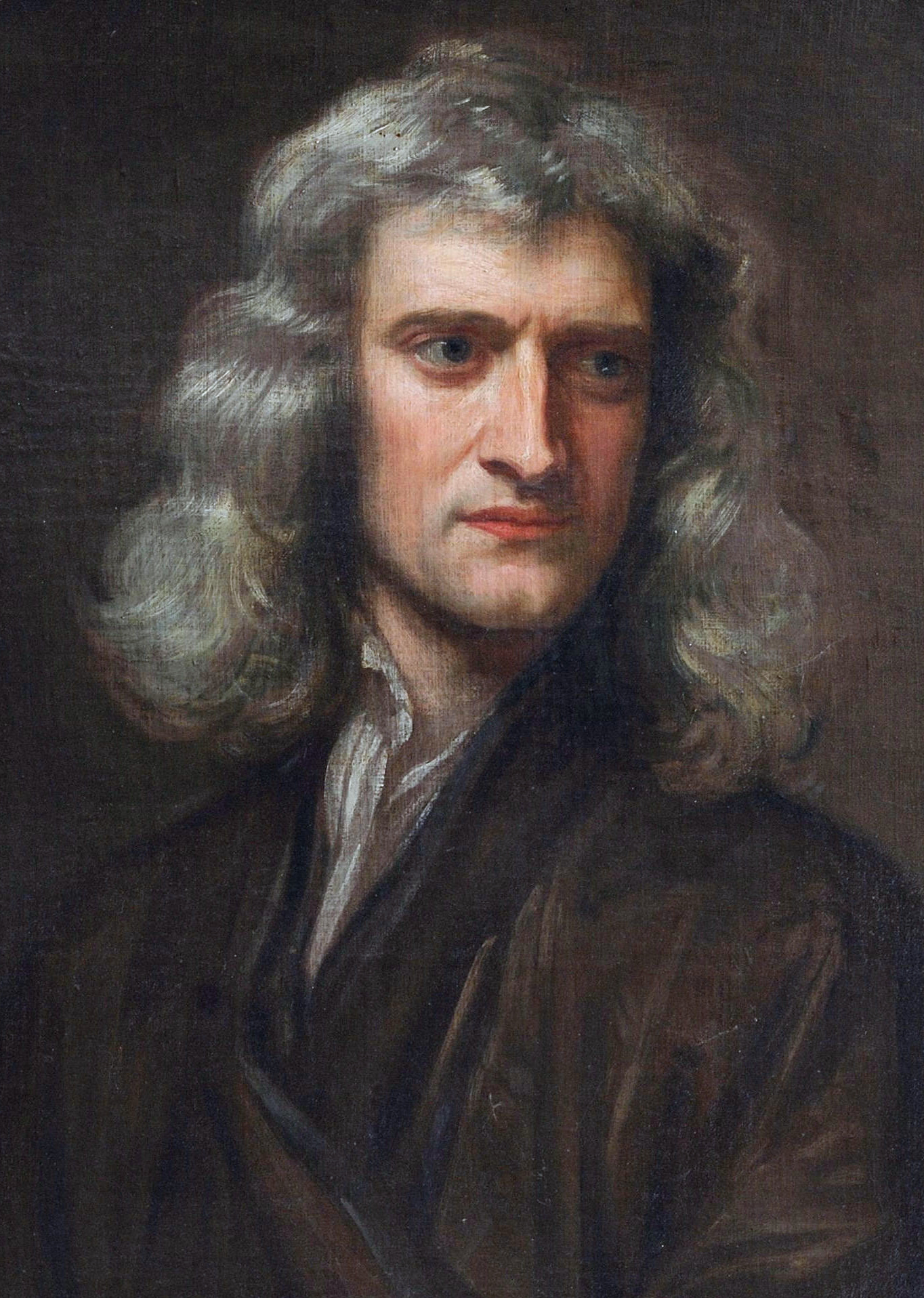
Isaac Newton

- January 2
  - Johannes van Haensbergen, Dutch Golden Age painter (d. 1705)
  - Mehmed IV, Sultan of the Ottoman Empire (1648-1687) (d. 1693)
- January 3 – Diego Morcillo Rubio de Auñón, Spanish-born Peruvian Catholic bishop (d. 1730)
- January 4 – Philippe Pierson, Belgian Jesuit missionary (d. 1688)
- January 5 – Johann Philipp Jeningen, German Catholic priest from Eichstätt, Bavaria (d. 1704)
- January 6
  - Julien Garnier, French Jesuit missionary to Canada (d. 1730)
  - Gisbert Steenwick, Dutch musician (d. 1679)
- January 11
  - Johann Friedrich Alberti, German composer and organist (d. 1710)
  - Mary Carleton, Englishwoman who used false identities (d. 1673)
- January 26 – Evert Collier, Dutch Golden Age painter (d. 1708)
- February 3 – Philip Aranda, Spanish Jesuit theologian (d. 1695)
- February 18 – Marie Champmeslé, French actress (d. 1698)
- March 2 – Claudio Coello, Spanish Baroque painter (d. 1693)
- March 4 – Stanisław Herakliusz Lubomirski, Polish noble (d. 1702)
- March 23 – Hester Davenport, English stage actress (d. 1717)
- March 25 – Anna Talbot, Countess of Shrewsbury, English countess (d. 1702)
- March 28 – Henry Wolrad, Count of Waldeck-Eisenberg (1645–1664) (d. 1664)
- March 29 – Emich Christian of Leiningen-Dagsburg, Lord of Broich, Oberstein and Bürgel (d. 1702)
- March 31 – Ephraim Curtis, American colonial military officer (d. 1684)
- April 15 – Suleiman II, Ottoman Sultan (d. 1691)
- April 21 – Simon de la Loubère, French diplomat (d. 1729)
- April 27 – Francisque Millet, Flemish-French painter (d. 1679)
- April 30 – Christian Weise, German writer, dramatist, poet, pedagogue and librarian (d. 1708)
- May 5 – James Tyrrell, English barrister and writer (d. 1718)
- June 8 – Frescheville Holles, English Member of Parliament (d. 1672)
- June 12 – Alexander Seton, 3rd Earl of Dunfermline, earl in the Peerage of Scotland (d. 1677)
- June 13 – Queen Myeongseong, Korean royal consort (d. 1684)
- June 18 – Paul Tallement the Younger, French writer (d. 1712)
- June 20 – George Hickes, English minister and scholar (d. 1715)
- June 28 – Jacob de Graeff, member of the De Graeff-family from the Dutch Golden Age (d. 1690)
- July 3 – Joseph-François Hertel de la Fresnière, military officer of New France (d. 1722)
- July 7 – Gregorio II Boncompagni, Italian nobleman, 5th Duke of Sora (d. 1707)
- July 25 – Louis I, Prince of Monaco, Monegasque prince (d. 1701)
- August 3 – Robert Austen, English politician (d. 1696)
- August 12 – Andrea Scacciati, Italian painter (d. 1710)
- August 14 – Cosimo III de' Medici, Grand Duke of Tuscany (d. 1723)
- September 1 – Angelo Paoli, Italian beatified (d. 1720)
- September 5 – Maria of Orange-Nassau, Dutch princess (d. 1688)
- September 6 – Georg Christoph Bach, German composer (d. 1697)
- September 23 – Giovanni Maria Bononcini, Italian violinist and composer (d. 1678)
- October 12 – Abraham van Calraet, Dutch painter (d. 1722)
- November 4 – Zheng Jing, Chinese pirate (d. 1681)
- November 5 – Nils Gyldenstolpe, Swedish count, official and diplomat (d. 1709)
- November 9 – Sir John Lowther, 2nd Baronet, of Whitehaven, English politician (d. 1706)
- November 11 – André Charles Boulle, French cabinet-maker (d. 1732)
- November 16 – Cornelis Evertsen the Youngest, Dutch admiral (d. 1706)
- November 24 – Anne Hilarion de Tourville, French naval commander under King Louis XIV (d. 1701)
- November 30 – Andrea Pozzo, Jesuit Brother, architect and painter (d. 1709)
- December 6
  - Johann Christoph Bach, German composer and organist (d. 1703)
  - Gerard Callenburgh, Dutch admiral (d. 1722)
- December 8 – Nicolas Roland, French priest and founder (d. 1678)
- December 13 – Friedrich Seyler, Swiss theologian (d. 1708)
- December 17
  - Francisco Castillo Fajardo, Marquis of Villadarias, Spanish general (d. 1716)
  - Francis de Geronimo, Italian priest (d. 1716)
- December 23 (O.S.) – John Holt, English lawyer (d. 1710)
- December 25 (O.S.) – Sir Isaac Newton, English scientist (d. 1727)
- December 30
  - Vincenzo da Filicaja, Italian poet (d. 1707)
  - François Roger de Gaignières, French genealogist, antiquary, collector (d. 1715)
- Abdul-Qādir Bedil, Persian Sufi poet (d. 1720)
- Bonaventure Giffard, English Catholic priest (d. 1734)
- Thomas Hancorne, Welsh clergyman and theologian (d. 1731)
- Albert Janse Ryckman, Mayor of Albany, prominent brewermaster (d. 1737)
- Marie Anne de La Trémoille, princesse des Ursins, politically active Spanish court official (d. 1722)

1643

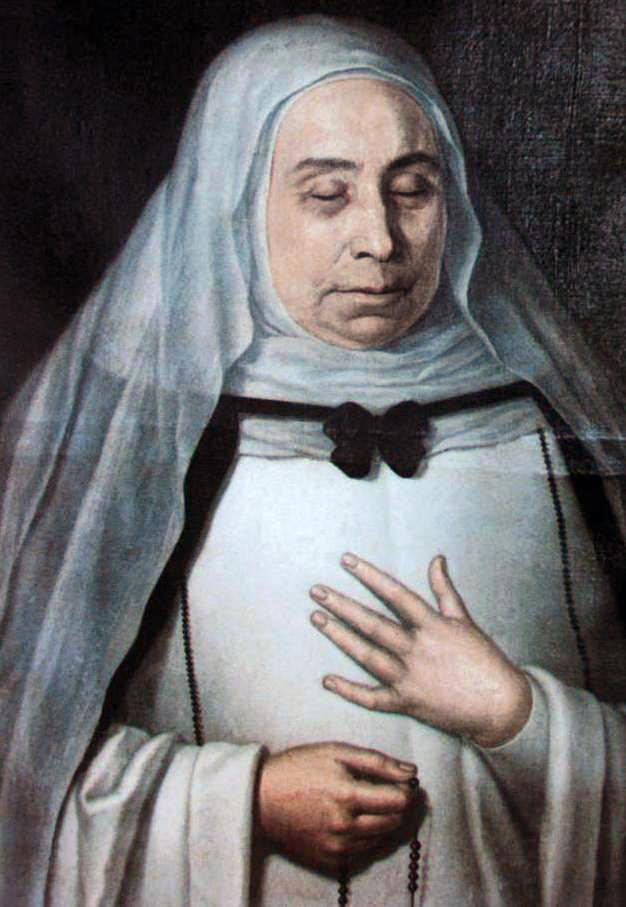
Mary of Jesus de León y Delgado

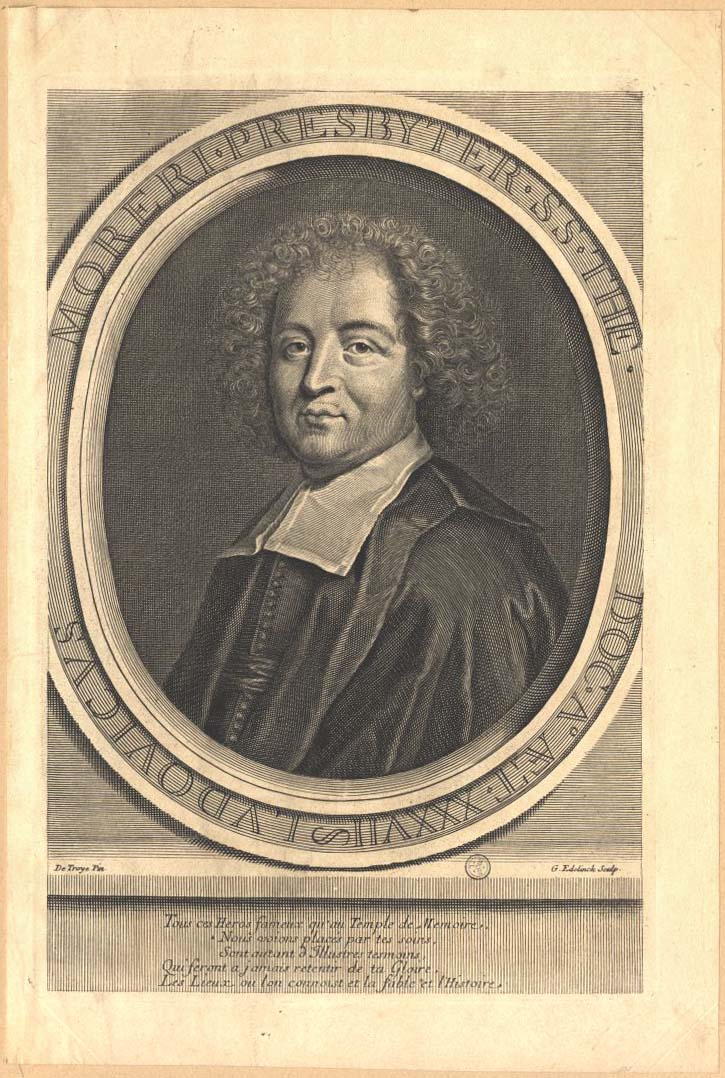
Louis Moréri

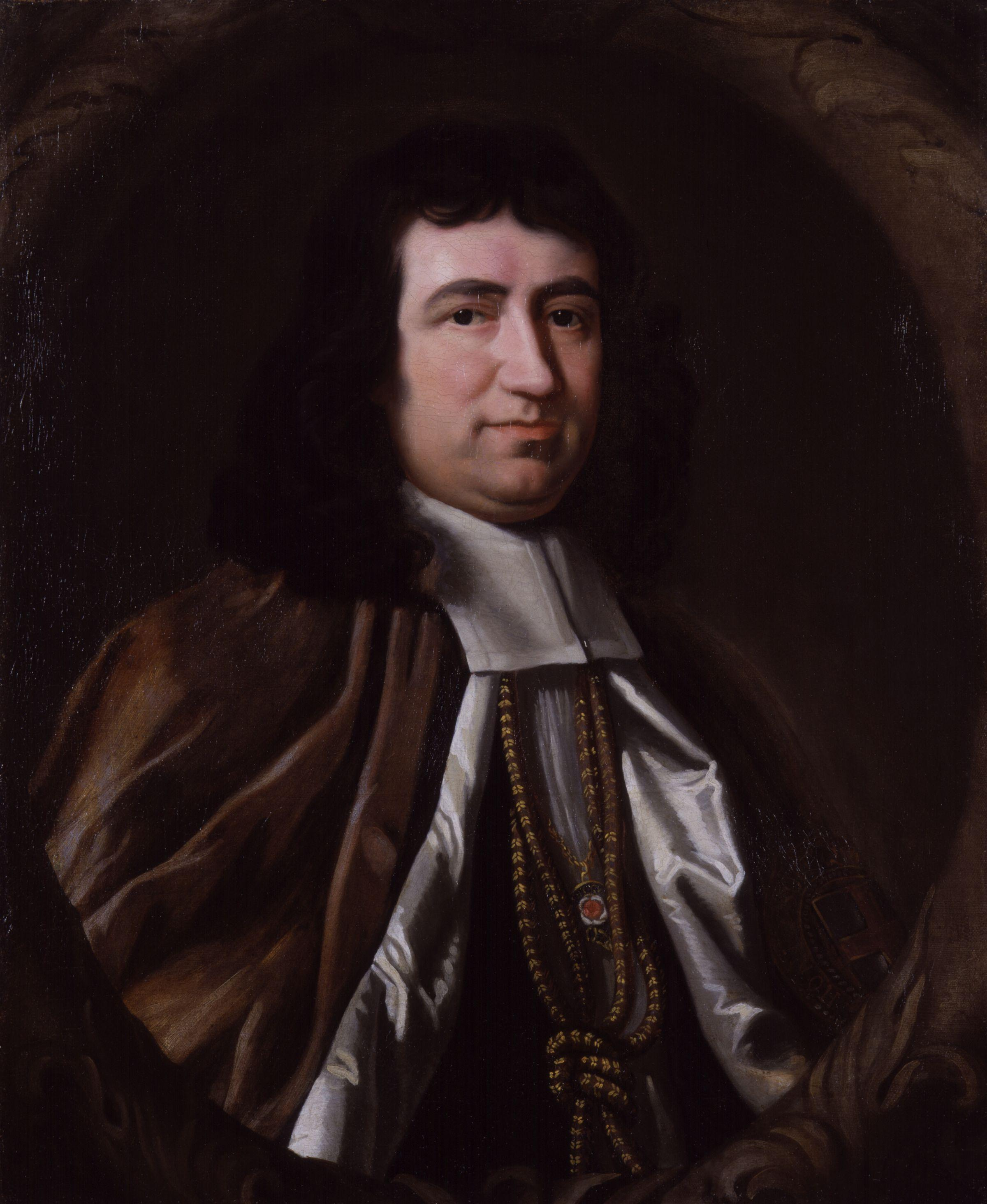
Gilbert Burnet

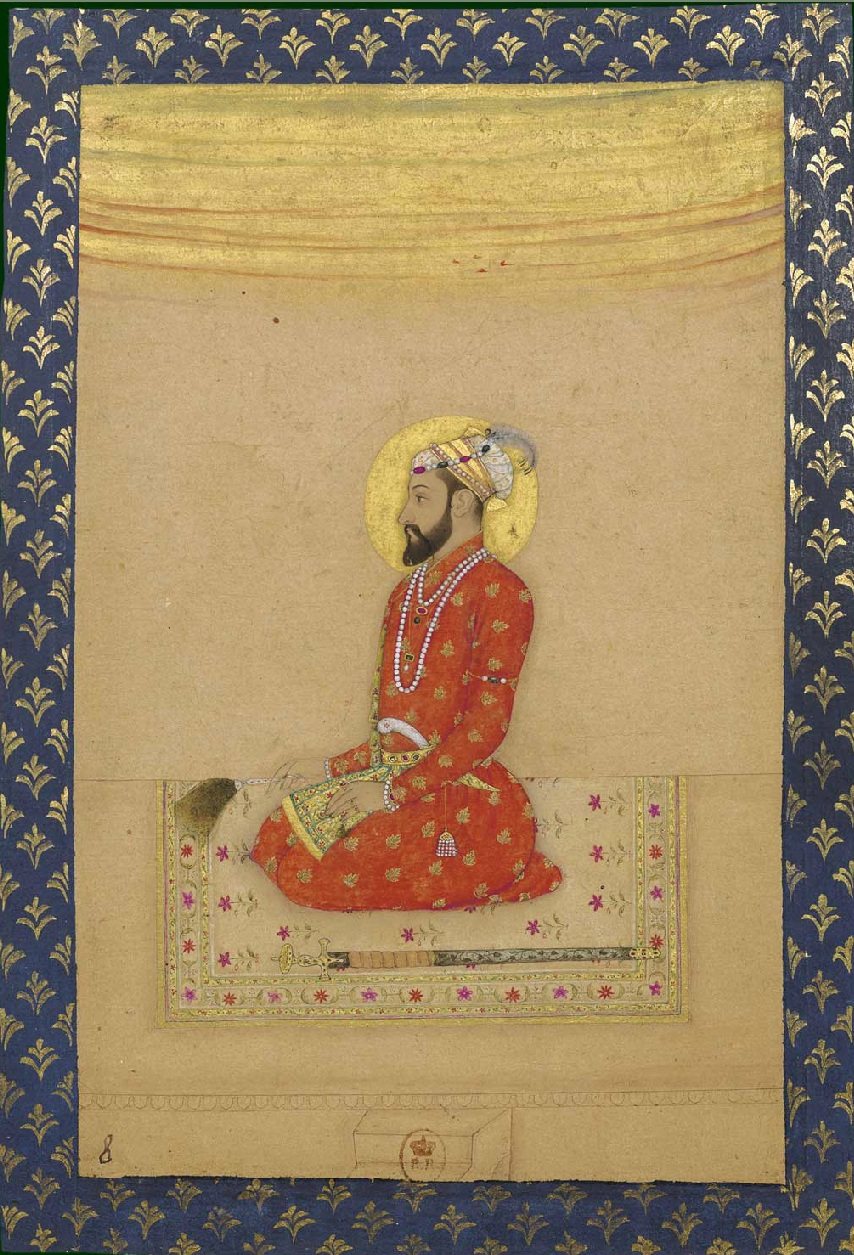
Bahadur Shah I

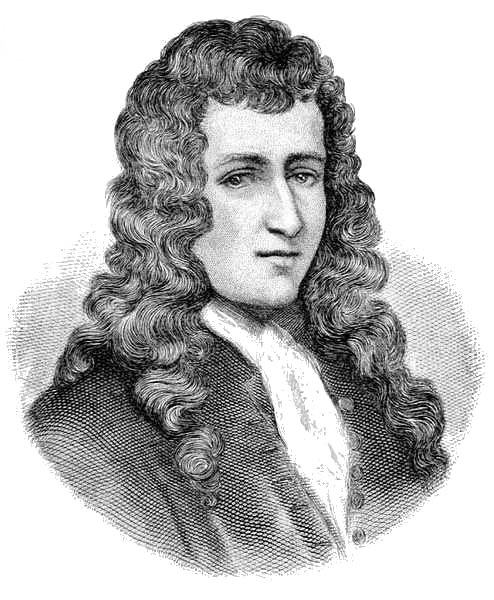
René-Robert Cavelier, Sieur de La Salle

- January 2 – Eleonora d'Este, Italian princess, later nun (d. 1722)
- January 4 (N.S.) – Sir Isaac Newton, English scientist (d. 1727)
- January 7 (O.S.) – Sir Samuel Grimston, 3rd Baronet, English politician (d. 1700)
- January 9 – Eleonoro Pacello, Italian Catholic prelate, Bishop of Pula (1689–1695) (d. 1695)
- January 13 – Axel Wachtmeister, Count of Mälsåker, Swedish field marshal (d. 1699)
- January 25 – John Hayes, English politician (d. 1705)
- January 24 – Charles Sackville, 6th Earl of Dorset, English poet and courtier (d. 1706)
- January 30 – Sir Francis Blundell, 3rd Baronet, Irish politician (d. 1707)
- February 6
  - Charles Fanshawe, 4th Viscount Fanshawe, English politician (d. 1710)
  - Johann Kasimir Kolbe von Wartenberg, Prussian politician (d. 1712)
- February 15 – García Felipe de Legazpi y Velasco Altamirano y Albornoz, Spanish Catholic prelate, Bishop of Tlaxcala (d. 1706)
- February 25
  - Sultan Ahmed II of the Ottoman Empire (d. 1695)
  - Christian Franz Paullini, German physician (d. 1712)
- March 4 – Fran Krsto Frankopan, Croatian baroque poet, nobleman and politician (d. 1671)
- March 6 – Pierre de Langle, French bishop and theologian (d. 1724)
- March 8 – Nabeshima Naoyuki, Japanese daimyō (d. 1725)
- March 17 – Fabrizio Spada, Italian Catholic cardinal (d. 1717)
- March 23 – Mary of Jesus de León y Delgado, Spanish Dominican lay sister and mystic (d. 1731)
- March 25 – Louis Moréri, French priest and encyclopaedist (d. 1680)
- March 28 – Anthony Dopping, Anglican Bishop of Meath (d. 1697)
- March 29 – Louis Phélypeaux, comte de Pontchartrain (d. 1727)
- April 3 – Charles V, Duke of Lorraine (d. 1690)
- April 6 – Nehemiah Jewett, American colonial politician (d. 1720)
- April 30 – Johann Oswald Harms, German Baroque painter (d. 1708)
- May 3 – Georg Franck von Franckenau, German botanist (d. 1704)
- May 7 – Stephanus Van Cortlandt, first native-born mayor of New York City (d. 1700)
- May 8 – George Louis I, Count of Erbach-Erbach (1672–1693) (d. 1693)
- May 9 – Charles Kirkhoven, 1st Earl of Bellomont, Dutch-born Irish peer (d. 1683)
- May 10 – Gabriel Revel, French painter (d. 1712)
- May 29 – Patrick Lyon, 3rd Earl of Strathmore and Kinghorne, Scottish peer and the son of John Lyon (d. 1695)
- July 3 – Johann Ernst von Thun, Tyrolean Catholic bishop (d. 1709)
- July 26 – Burchard de Volder, Dutch mathematician (d. 1709)
- July 28 – Antonio Tarsia, Italian composer (d. 1722)
- July 29 – Henri Jules, Prince of Condé (d. 1709)
- August 3 – Charles de la Rue, French Jesuit, Latin poet (d. 1725)
- August 16 – Mumtaz Shikoh, Mughal Empire emperor (d. 1647)
- August 18 – William Louis, Prince of Anhalt-Harzgerode (1670–1709) (d. 1709)
- August 21 – King Afonso VI of Portugal, King of Portugal and the Algarves (d. 1683)
- August 26 – Cardinal de Bouillon, French Catholic cardinal (d. 1715)
- September 3 – Lorenzo Bellini, Italian physician, anatomist (d. 1704)
- September 5 – Sir William Portman, 6th Baronet, English politician (d. 1690)
- September 6 – François-Joseph de Beaupoil de Sainte-Aulaire, French poet (d. 1742)
- September 14
  - Jeremiah Dummer, American silversmith (d. 1718)
  - Joseph de Jouvancy, French historian (d. 1719)
- September 17 – Francis Howard, 5th Baron Howard of Effingham, English peer (d. 1694)
- September 18 – Gilbert Burnet, Scottish philosopher and historian (d. 1715)
- September 27 – Solomon Stoddard, pastor of the Congregationalist Church in Northampton, Massachusetts (d. 1729)
- September 30 – Samuel Hoadly, American-born English schoolmaster, writer of educational books (d. 1705)
- October 5 – Zinat-un-Nissa, princess of the Mughal Empire (d. 1721)
- October 14 – Bahadur Shah I, Mughal Emperor of India (d. 1712)
- October 25 – Georg Ludwig Agricola, German composer (d. 1676)
- November 1 – John Strype, English historian and biographer (d. 1737)
- November 4 – Asano Nagatomo, Japanese daimyō who ruled the Akō Domain (d. 1675)
- November 16 – Jean Chardin, French jeweller, traveller (d. 1713)
- November 22 – René-Robert Cavelier, Sieur de La Salle, French explorer (d. 1687)
- November 23 – Eberhard von Danckelmann, Prussian politician (d. 1722)
- December 24 – Israel Kolmodin, Swedish hymnwriter and priest (d. 1709)
- December 28 – Salomon van Til, theologian of the Dutch Reformed Church (d. 1713)
- Ilona Zrínyi, Hungarian heroine (d. 1703)
- Marie Grubbe, Danish countess (d. 1718)
- Eva Krotoa, Khoi translator and interpreter (d. 1674)

1644

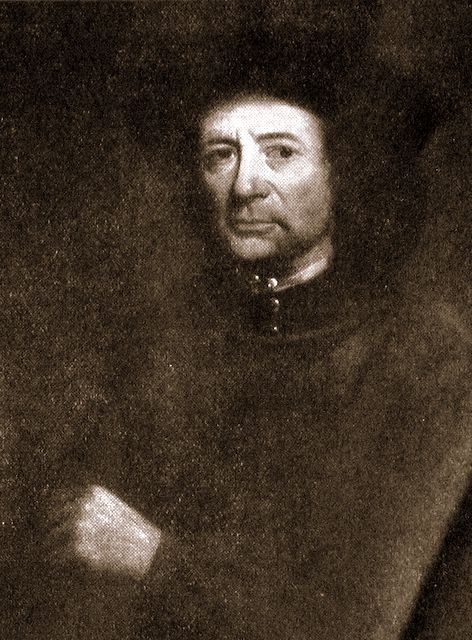
Thomas Britton

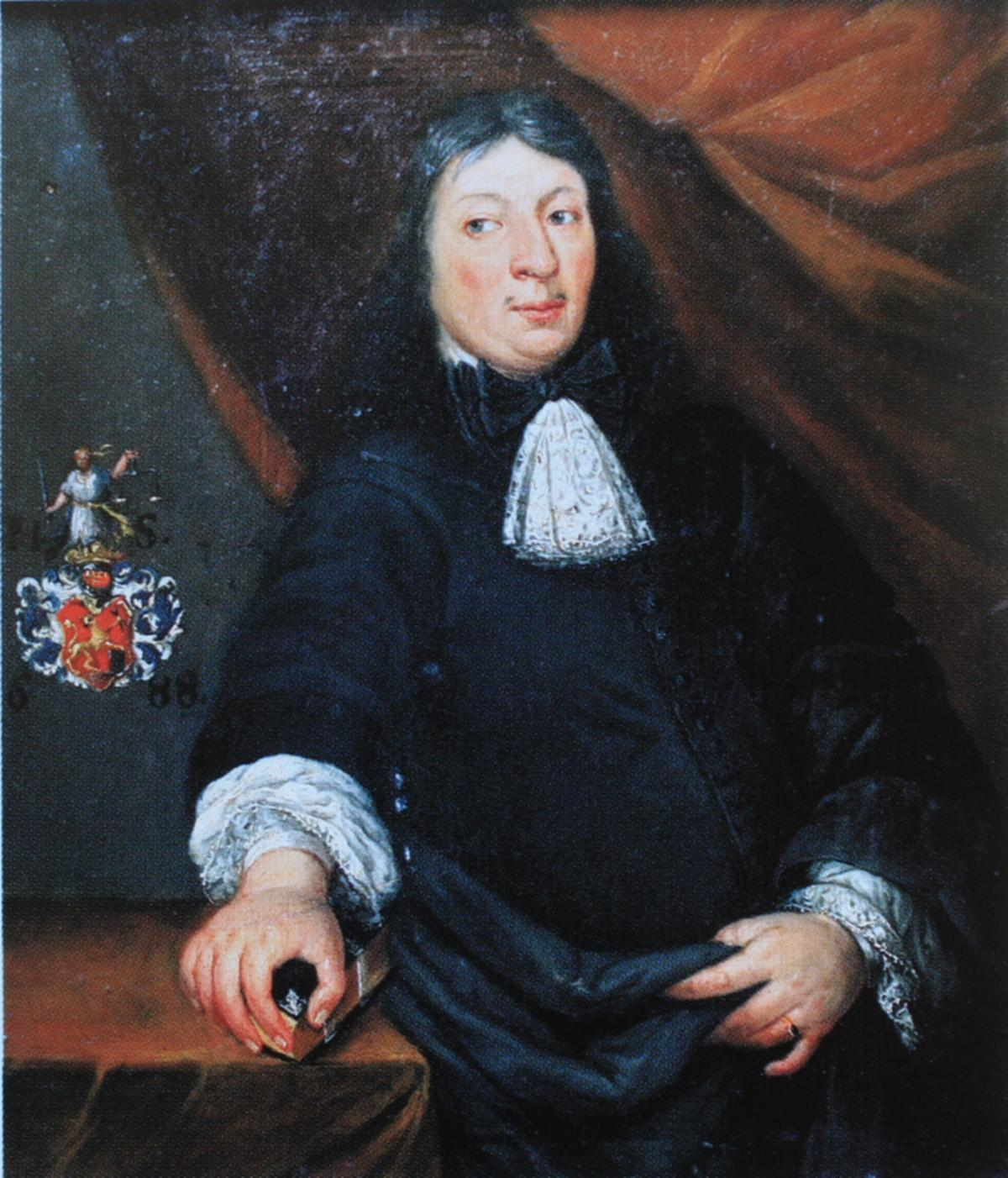
Veit Hans Schnorr von Carolsfeld

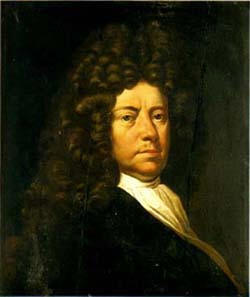
Otto Mencke

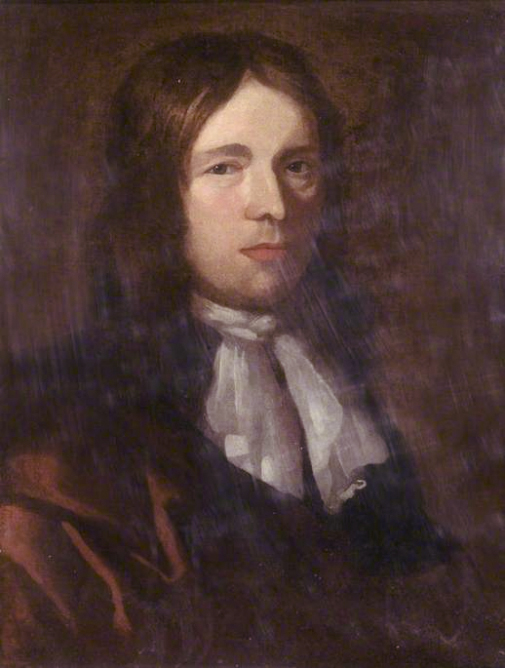
Henry Winstanley

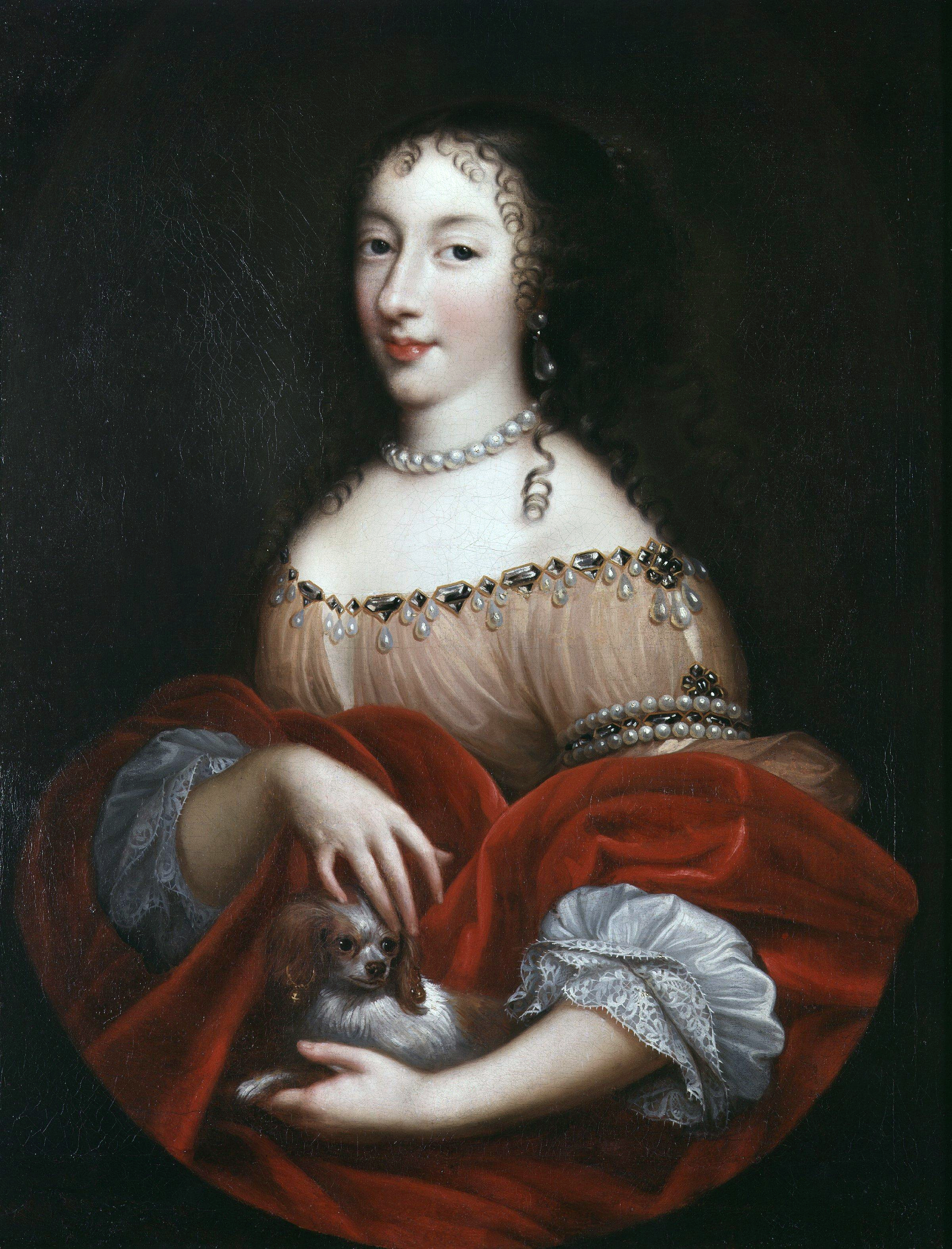
Henrietta of England

- January 9 – Robert Gibbes, English-born landgrave in South Carolina (d. 1715)
- January 10
  - Louis François, duc de Boufflers, Marshal of France (d. 1711)
  - Celestino Sfondrati, Italian Catholic cardinal (d. 1696)
- January 11 – Hayashi Hōkō, Japanese philosopher (d. 1732)
- January 14 – Thomas Britton, English concert promoter (d. 1714)
- January 18 – John Partridge, English astrologer (d. 1708)
- January 23 – Jonas Budde, Norwegian army officer (d. 1710)
- January 25 – Antoine Thomas, Jesuit missionary priest and astronomer (d. 1709)
- January 26 – Thomas Boylston, American colonial doctor (d. 1695)
- February 2
  - Isaac Chayyim Cantarini, Italian rabbi (d. 1723)
  - Johannes Hancke, German writer (d. 1713)
- February 7 – Nils Bielke, member of the High Council of Sweden (d. 1716)
- February 8 – Pierre de La Broue, American bishop (d. 1720)
- February 12 – Jakob Ammann, Swiss founder of the Amish sect (d. 1712)
- February 24 – Maria Elisabeth Lämmerhirt, German mother of Johann Sebastian Bach (d. 1694)
- March 1 – Simon Foucher, French polemicist (d. 1696)
- March 15 – Veit Hans Schnorr von Carolsfeld, German iron and cobalt magnate (d. 1715)
- March 21 – Sir Walter Bagot, 3rd Baronet, English politician (d. 1704)
- March 22
  - Otto Mencke, German philosopher and scientist (d. 1707)
  - Sir James Rushout, 1st Baronet, English politician (d. 1698)
- March 25 – Heinrich von Cocceji, German jurist from Bremen (d. 1719)
- March 31 – Henry Winstanley, English engineer (d. 1703)
- April 6 – António Luís de Sousa, 2nd Marquis of Minas, Portuguese general, governor-general of Brazil (d. 1721)
- April 7
  - Nathaniel Johnson, American politician (d. 1713)
  - François de Neufville, duc de Villeroy, French soldier (d. 1730)
- April 11 – Marie Jeanne Baptiste of Savoy-Nemours, Duchess of Savoy (d. 1724)
- April 17 – Abraham Storck, Dutch painter (d. 1708)
- April 21 – Conrad von Reventlow, Danish statesman, first Grand Chancellor of Denmark (d. 1708)
- May 2 – Robert Cotton, English politician (d. 1717)
- May 4 – Juan Caballero y Ocio, Spanish priest remarkable for lavish gifts to the Catholic Church and charity (d. 1707)
- May 5 – Sir Richard Newdigate, 2nd Baronet, English landowner (d. 1710)
- May 26 – Michael Ettmüller, German physician (d. 1683)
- June 2 – William Salmon, English medical writer (d. 1713)
- June 7 – Johann Christoph Volkamer, German botanist (d. 1720)
- June 16 – Henrietta Anne Stuart, Princess of Scotland, England and Ireland and Duchess of Orléans (d. 1670)
- June 17 – Johann Wolfgang Franck, German baroque composer (d. 1710)
- July 2 – Abraham a Sancta Clara, German Augustinian friar (d. 1709)
- July 4 – Josceline Percy, 11th Earl of Northumberland, English noble (d. 1670)
- July 7 – Joan Geelvinck, Dutch politician (d. 1707)
- July 10 – Miguel Bayot, Spanish Catholic prelate, Bishop of Cebu (from 1697) (d. 1700)
- July 22 – Peter Drelincourt, Irish chaplain (d. 1722)
- August 6
  - Christian Ernst, Margrave of Brandenburg-Bayreuth (1655–1712) (d. 1712)
  - Louise de La Vallière, French mistress of Louis XIV of France (d. 1710)
- August 12 – Heinrich Ignaz Franz Biber, Bohemian composer and violinist (d. 1704)
- August 28 (bapt.) – Gilles Schey, Dutch admiral (d. 1703)
- August 29 – Anne Bourdon, nun in New France (d. 1711)
- August 30 – Thomas Tufton, 6th Earl of Thanet, English politician (d. 1729)
- September 3 – Richard Newport, 2nd Earl of Bradford, English politician (d. 1723)
- September 6 – Juan Bautista Cabanilles, Spanish composer (d. 1712)
- September 11 – Jacob Rotius, Dutch painter (d. 1681)
- September 22 – Jacques Échard, French Dominican, historian of the Order (d. 1724)
- September 25 – Ole Rømer, Danish astronomer (d. 1710)
- October 1 – Jean Rousseau, French viol player (d. 1699)
- October 2 – François-Timoléon de Choisy, French abbé, author and cross-dresser (d. 1724)
- October 3 – Adriaen Frans Boudewijns, landscape painter (d. 1719)
- October 12 – Christopher Sandius, Dutch Arian writer (d. 1680)
- October 13 – Sipihr Shikoh, Mughal Emperor (d. 1708)
- October 14 – William Penn, English Quaker and founder of Pennsylvania (d. 1718)
- October 26 – Mathias Steuchius, Swedish archbishop (d. 1730)
- November 23 (bapt.) – Cornelia van der Gon, Dutch art collector (d. 1701)
- December 8 – Maria d'Este, Italian noble (d. 1684)
- December 9 – Robert Kirk, Scottish folklorist, Bible translator, Gaelic scholar (d. 1692)
- December 23 – Tomás de Torrejón y Velasco, Spanish composer, musician and organist (d. 1728)
- December 25 – Walter Scott, Earl of Tarras, Scottish nobleman (d. 1693)
- December 29 – Philips van Almonde, Dutch Lieutenant Admiral (d. 1711)
- Matsuo Bashō, Japanese poet (d. 1694)
- Pietro Erardi, Maltese chaplain and painter (d. 1727)
- Antonio Stradivari, Italian violin maker (d. 1737)

1645

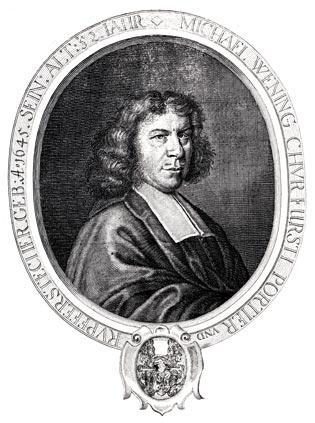
Michael Wening

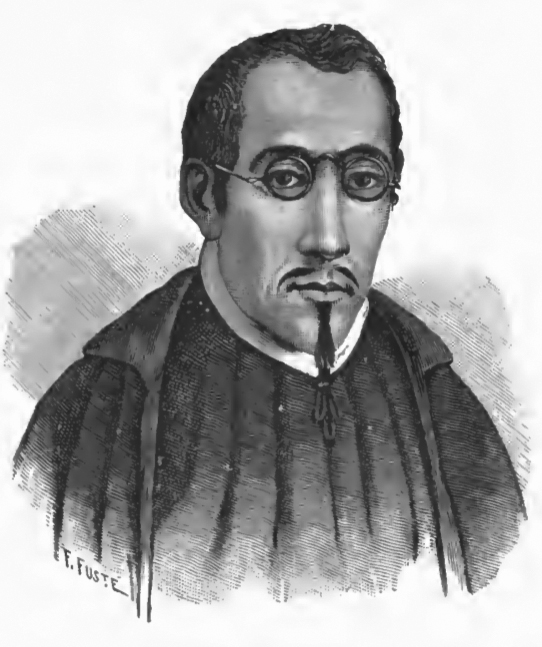
Carlos de Sigüenza y Góngora

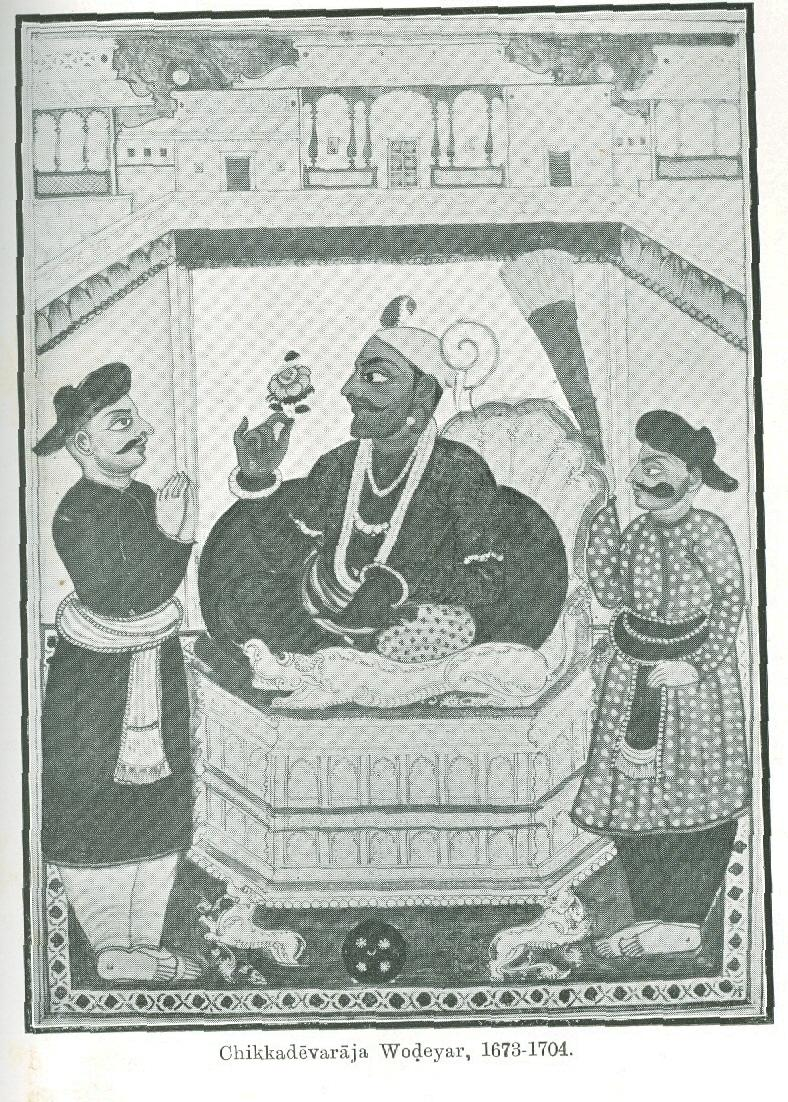
Chikka Devaraja

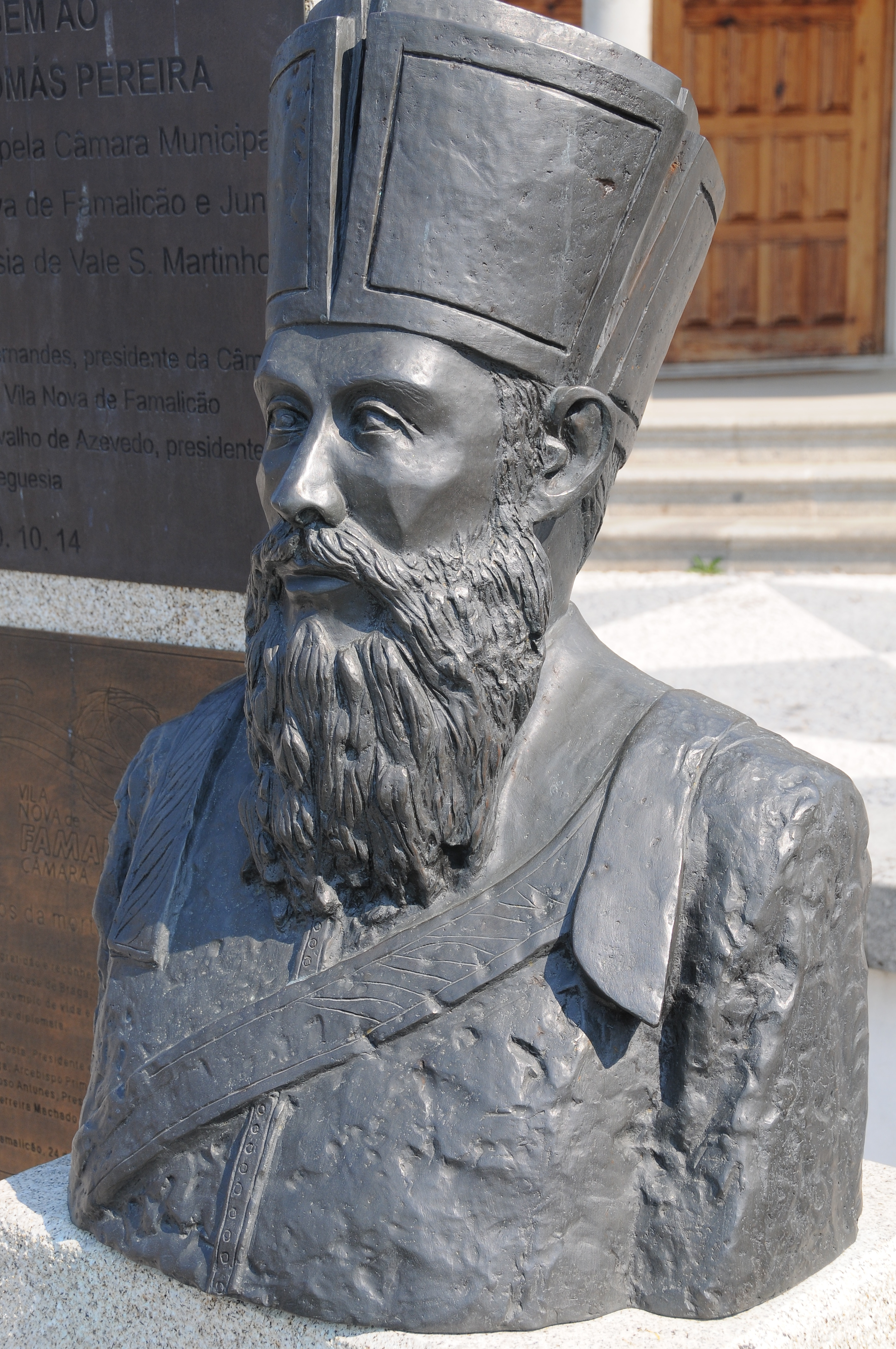
Thomas Pereira

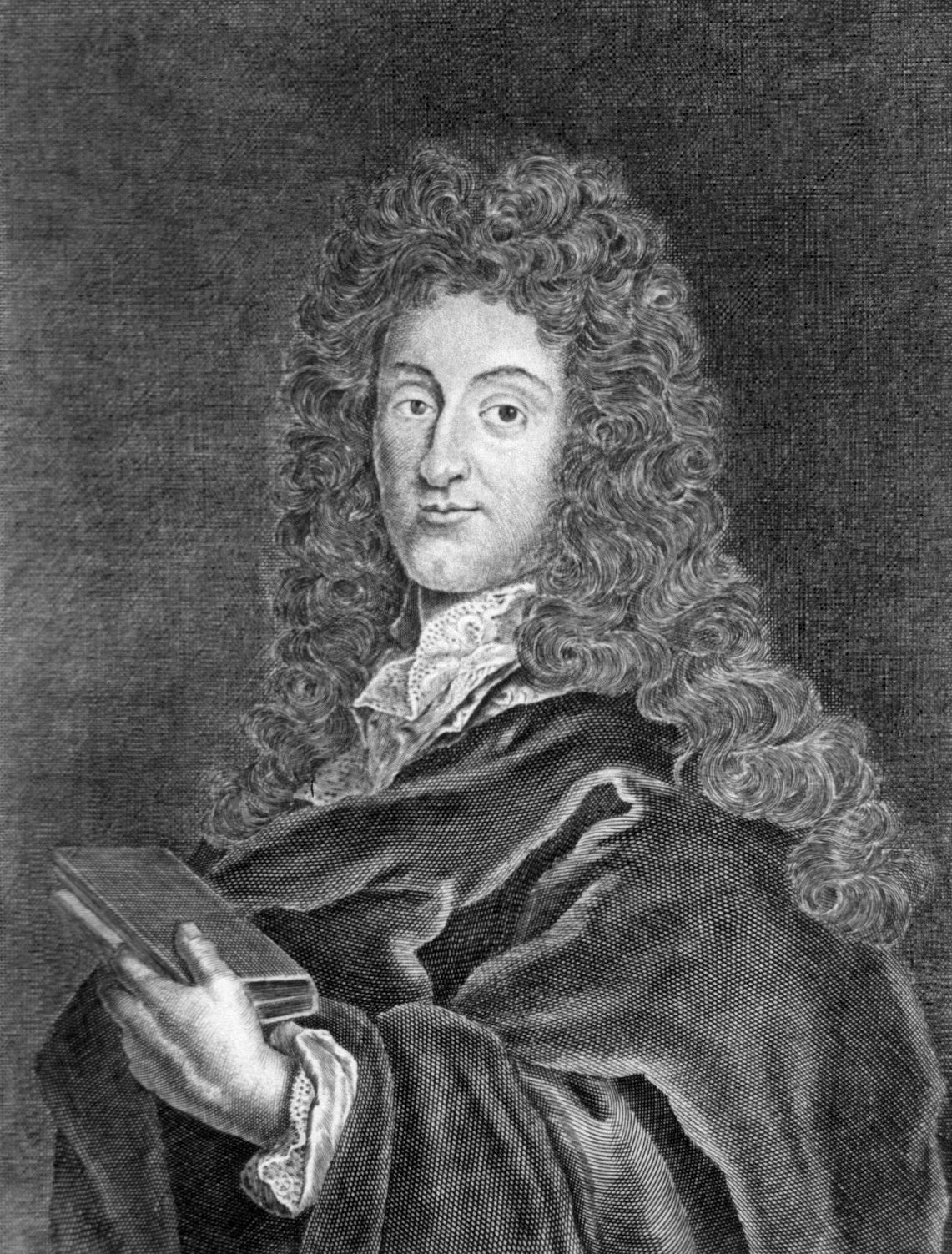
Nicolas Lemery

- January 9 – Sir William Villiers, 3rd Baronet, English politician (d. 1712)
- January 22 – Isaac Addington, longtime functionary of various colonial governments of Massachusetts (d. 1719)
- January 28 – Gottfried Vopelius, German academic (d. 1715)
- February 9 – Johann Aegidius Bach, German organist, father of Johann Bernhard Bach (d. 1716)
- February 16 – John Sharp, English Archbishop of York (d. 1714)
- February 13 – Vere Fane, 4th Earl of Westmorland, England (d. 1693)
- February 22
  - Johann Ambrosius Bach, German musician (d. 1695)
  - Johann Christoph Bach, German composer (d. 1693)
- February 24 – Francis I Rákóczi, Hungarian prince of Transylvania (d. 1676)
- March 17 – Peter Du Cane, the elder, British noble Huguenot refugee (d. 1714)
- March 20 – Arthur Brownlow, Anglo-Irish politician (d. 1711)
- March 25 – Marco Battaglini, Italian Catholic bishop (d. 1717)
- April 3 – François Vachon de Belmont, French Catholic bishop (d. 1732)
- April 11 – Juan del Valle y Caviedes, Spanish-born Peruvian poet (d. 1697)
- April 17 – James Olmsted, Connecticut politician (d. 1731)
- April 22 – Christine of Baden-Durlach, German noblewoman (d. 1705)
- May 3 – Thomas Maule, prominent Quaker in colonial Salem (d. 1724)
- May 4 – Thomas Alvey, English physician (d. 1704)
- May 14 – François de Callières, French writer and diplomat (d. 1717)
- May 15 – George Jeffreys, 1st Baron Jeffreys, British judge (d. 1689)
- June 13 – Giacomo Cantelmo, Italian Catholic cardinal (d. 1702)
- June 14 – Haquin Spegel, Swedish bishop (d. 1714)
- June 15 – Sidney Godolphin, 1st Earl of Godolphin, English politician (d. 1712)
- July 11 – Michael Wening, German engraver (d. 1718)
- July 27 – Frederik Johan van Baer, Dutch army commander (d. 1713)
- July 28 – Marguerite Louise d'Orléans, French princess (d. 1721)
- August – Charles Louis Simonneau, French engraver (d. 1728)
- August 3 – August Kühnel, German composer and violist (d. 1700)
- August 5 – Charles Schomberg, 2nd Duke of Schomberg, English general (d. 1693)
- August 6 – Joseph Herrick, principal law enforcement officer in Salem, Massachusetts (d. 1710)
- August 10 – Eusebio Kino, Italian Catholic missionary (d. 1711)
- August 14 – Carlos de Sigüenza y Góngora, Mexican academic (d. 1700)
- August 16 – Jean de La Bruyère, French writer (d. 1696)
- August 25 – Jacob van Wassenaer Obdam, Dutch general (d. 1714)
- August 30 – Giuseppe Avanzi, Italian painter (d. 1718)
- September 4
  - Johannes Jakob Buxtorf, Swiss Hebraist (d. 1705)
  - John North, 5th of fourteen children of Sir Dudley North (d. 1683)
- September 10 – Romeyn de Hooghe, Dutch Golden Age painter, engraver, and sculptor (d. 1708)
- September 21 – Louis Jolliet, French Canadian explorer known for his discoveries in North America (d. 1700)
- September 22 – Chikka Devaraja, Ruler of Mysore (d. 1704)
- September 25 – Naitō Kiyokazu, Japanese daimyō who ruled the Takatō Domain (d. 1714)
- September 28 – Sir Edward Hales, 3rd Baronet, English politician (d. 1695)
- October 1 – John Alford, English politician (d. 1691)
- October 7 – Bernard Desjean, Baron de Pointis, French admiral and privateer (d. 1707)
- October 10 – Jakob Gronovius, Dutch classical scholar (d. 1716)
- October 21 – Christine Charlotte of Württemberg, Regent of East Frisia (d. 1699)
- October 26 – Aert de Gelder, Dutch painter (d. 1727)
- October 28 – John Philip II, Wild- and Rhinegrave of Salm-Dhaun, German noble (d. 1693)
- November 1 – Thomas Pereira, Portuguese Jesuit mathematician (d. 1708)
- November 6 – Johann Gottfried von Guttenberg, Prince-Bishop of Würzburg (d. 1698)
- November 11 – Govert van der Leeuw, Dutch painter (d. 1688)
- November 12 – Georg Wolfgang Wedel, German physician, surgeon, botanist, chemist, philosopher (d. 1721)
- November 17 – Nicolas Lemery, French chemist (d. 1715)
- November 30 – Andreas Werckmeister, German organist, music theorist, and composer (d. 1706)
- December 3 – Michał Stefan Radziejowski, Polish Catholic cardinal (d. 1705)
- December 6 – Maria de Dominici, Maltese artist (d. 1703)
- December 14 – Jacob de Wilde, Dutch civil servant, art collector (d. 1721)
- December 24 – Hans Carl von Carlowitz, German forester (d. 1714)
- December 27 – Giovanni Antonio Viscardi, Swiss architect (d. 1713)
- Giovanni Antonio Fumiani, Venetian painter of the Baroque period (d. 1710)
- Captain William Kidd, Scottish pirate (d. 1701)

1646

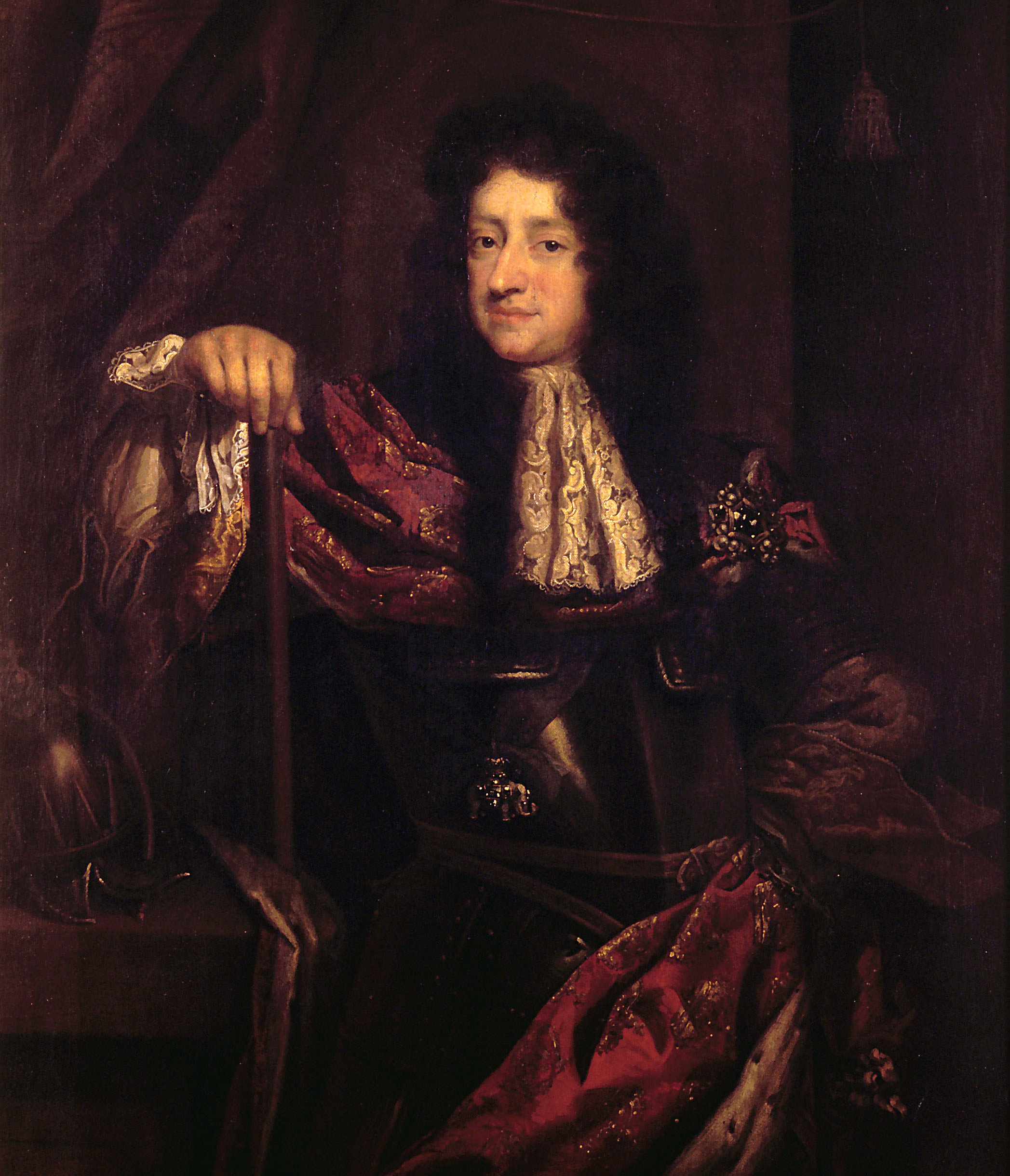
Christian V of Denmark

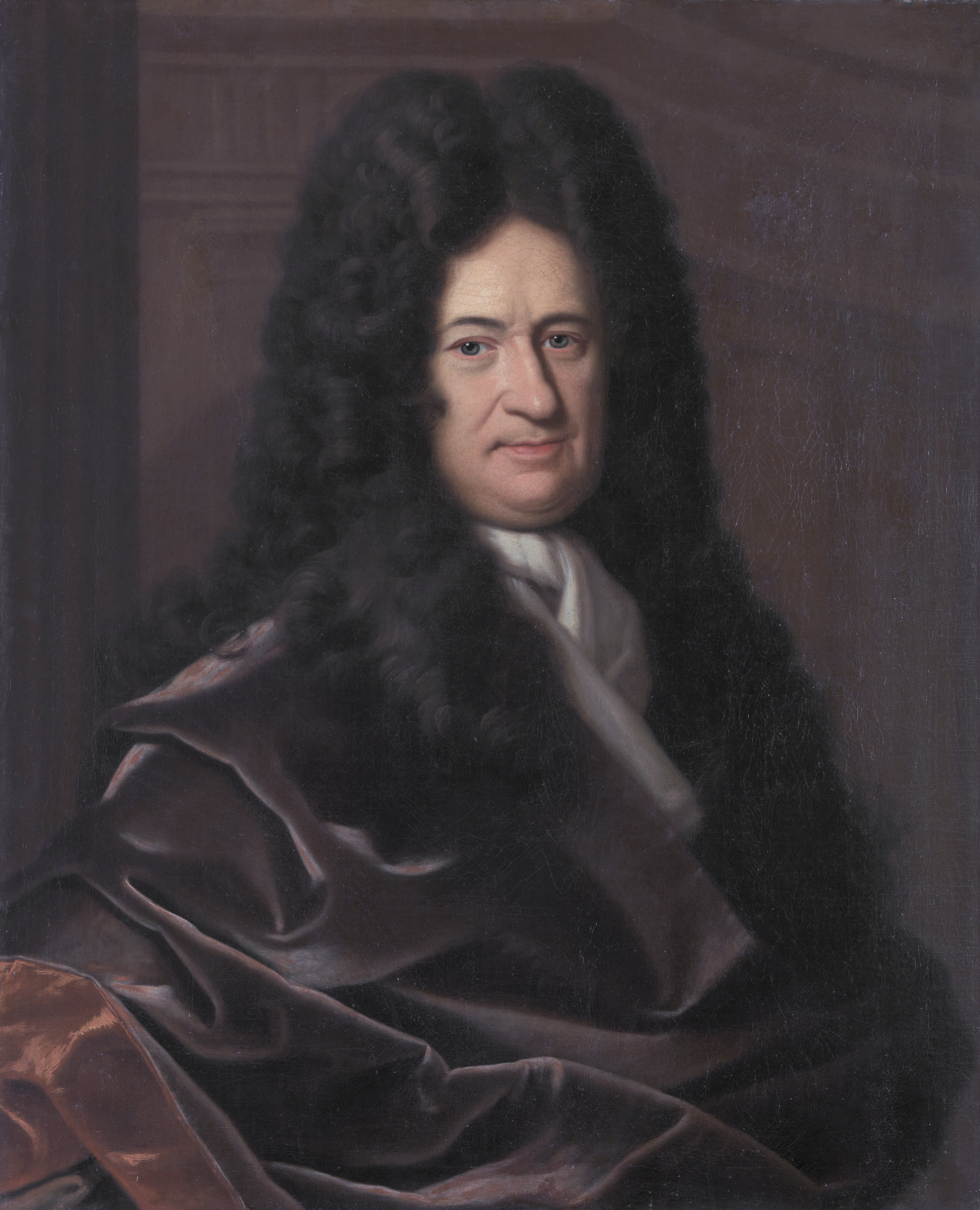
Gottfried Wilhelm Leibniz

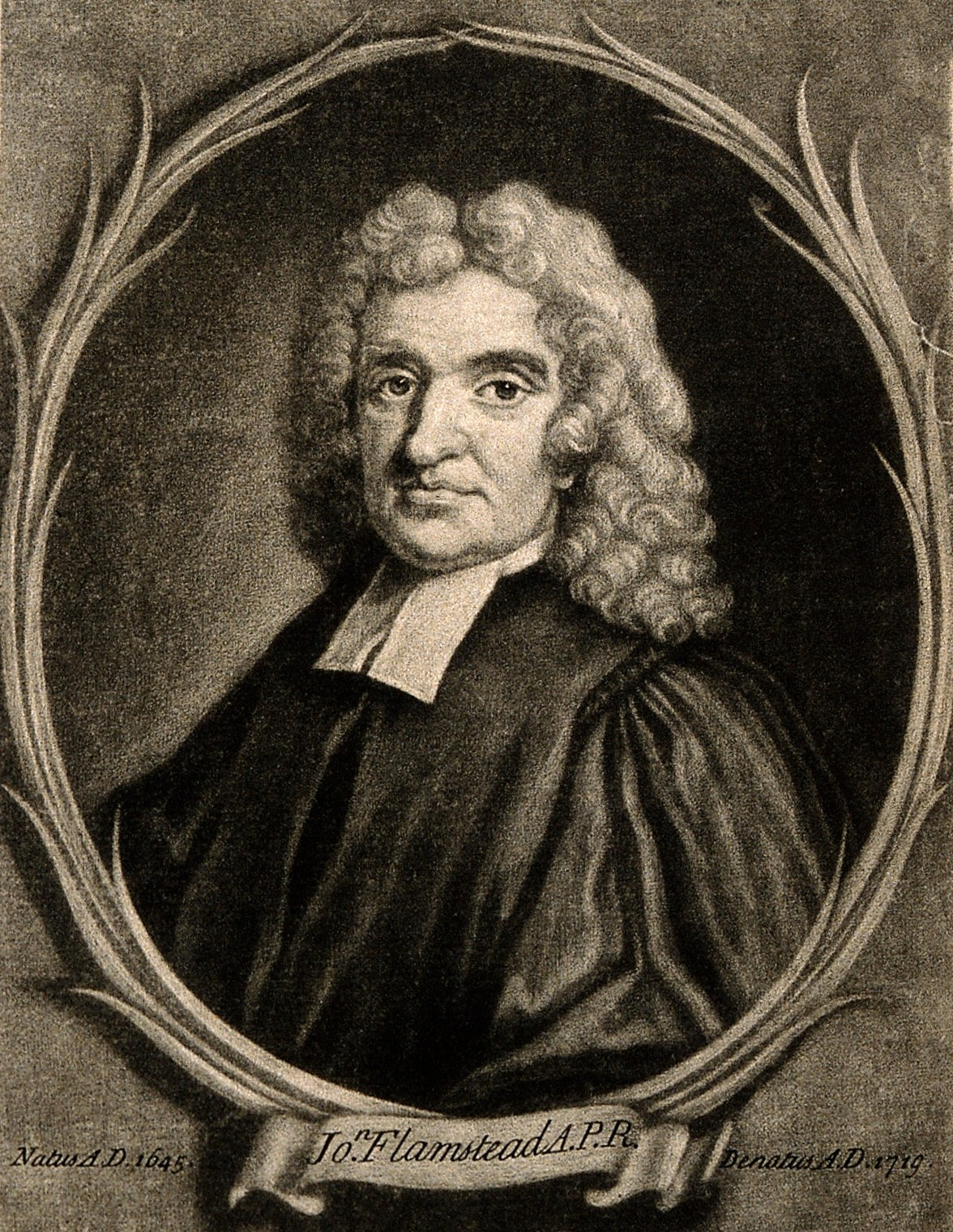
John Flamsteed

- January 1 – David Makeléer, Swedish politician (d. 1708)
- January 6 – Jan Van Cleef, Flemish painter (d. 1716)
- February 4 – Hans Erasmus Aßmann, German statesman and poet from the second Silesian school (d. 1699)
- February 10 – Hans Adam Weissenkircher, Austrian painter (d. 1695)
- February 17 – Pierre Le Pesant, sieur de Boisguilbert, French economist (d. 1714)
- February 23 – Tokugawa Tsunayoshi, Japanese shōgun (d. 1709)
- March 19 – Michael Kongehl, German poet and hymnwriter (d. 1710)
- March 25 – Niels Jonsson Stromberg af Clastorp, Swedish noble (d. 1723)
- April 1 – Hermann Otto II of Limburg Stirum, German army commander (d. 1704)
- April 4 – Antoine Galland, French orientalist and archaeologist (d. 1715)
- April 6 – Henry Goring, English politician (d. 1685)
- April 12 – Pietro Dandini, Italian painter (d. 1712)
- April 15 – King Christian V of Denmark (d. 1699)
- April 16 – Jules Hardouin-Mansart, French Baroque architect (d. 1708)
- April 20
  - Giacinto Calandrucci, Italian painter (d. 1707)
  - Charles Plumier, French botanist (d. 1704)
- May 12 – George IV, Count of Erbach-Fürstenau (1672–1678) (d. 1678)
- May 29 – Isaac Johannes Lamotius, Dutch Governor of Mauritius (d. 1718)
- June 5 – Elena Cornaro Piscopia, Venetian philosopher of noble descent (d. 1684)
- June 6 – Hortense Mancini, favourite Italian niece of Cardinal Mazarin (d. 1699)
- June 21 – Maria Francisca of Savoy (d. 1683)
- June 30 – Paul Hermann, German botanist (d. 1695)
- July 1 – Gottfried Wilhelm Leibniz, German philosopher, scientist, and mathematician (d. 1716)
- July 9 – Zeger Bernhard van Espen, Belgian jurist (d. 1728)
- July 15 – Frederick I, Duke of Saxe-Gotha-Altenburg (1675–1691) (d. 1691)
- July 20
  - François Vaillant de Gueslis, Jesuit missionary (d. 1718)
  - Eusèbe Renaudot, French theologian and orientalist (d. 1720)
- July 24 – Madeleine Boullogne, French painter (d. 1710)
- July 29 – Johann Theile, German composer and organist (d. 1724)
- August 2
  - Jean-Baptiste du Casse, French admiral and buccaneer (d. 1715)
  - John Lauder, Lord Fountainhall, Scottish jurist (d. 1722)
- August 8
  - Godfrey Kneller, German-born painter (d. 1723)
  - Eleonore Charlotte of Saxe-Lauenburg-Franzhagen, Duchess of Schleswig-Holstein-Sonderburg-Franzhagen (d. 1709)
- August 12 – Louise Elisabeth of Courland, Landgrave of Hesse-Homburg (d. 1690)
- August 16 – Juan Francisco de Padilla y San Martín, Spanish Catholic prelate, Bishop of Santa Cruz de la Sierra and Bishop of Puerto Rico (d. 1700)
- August 19 – John Flamsteed, British astronomer (d. 1719)
- August 24 – Roger Boyle, 2nd Earl of Orrery, Member of the Irish House of Commons (d. 1682)
- August 28 – Tsugaru Nobumasa, Japanese daimyō (d. 1710)
- September 16 – Juan Romero de Figueroa, Spanish priest (d. 1720)
- October 3 – Joseph Parrocel, French Baroque painter (d. 1704)
- October 7 – Charles Honoré d'Albert, duc de Luynes, French noble (d. 1712)
- October 10 – Françoise-Marguerite de Sévigné, French countess (d. 1705)
- November 8 – Cresheld Draper, English politician (d. 1694)
- November 9 – John Egerton, 3rd Earl of Bridgewater, English politician (d. 1701)
- November 27 – Edward Howard, 2nd Earl of Carlisle, English politician (d. 1692)
- December 4 – Alain Emmanuel de Coëtlogon, Marshal of France in the reign of Louis XIV and Louis XV (d. 1730)
- December 26
  - Robert Bolling, wealthy early American settler, planter and merchant (d. 1709)
  - Élisabeth Marguerite d'Orléans, French noble (d. 1696)

1647

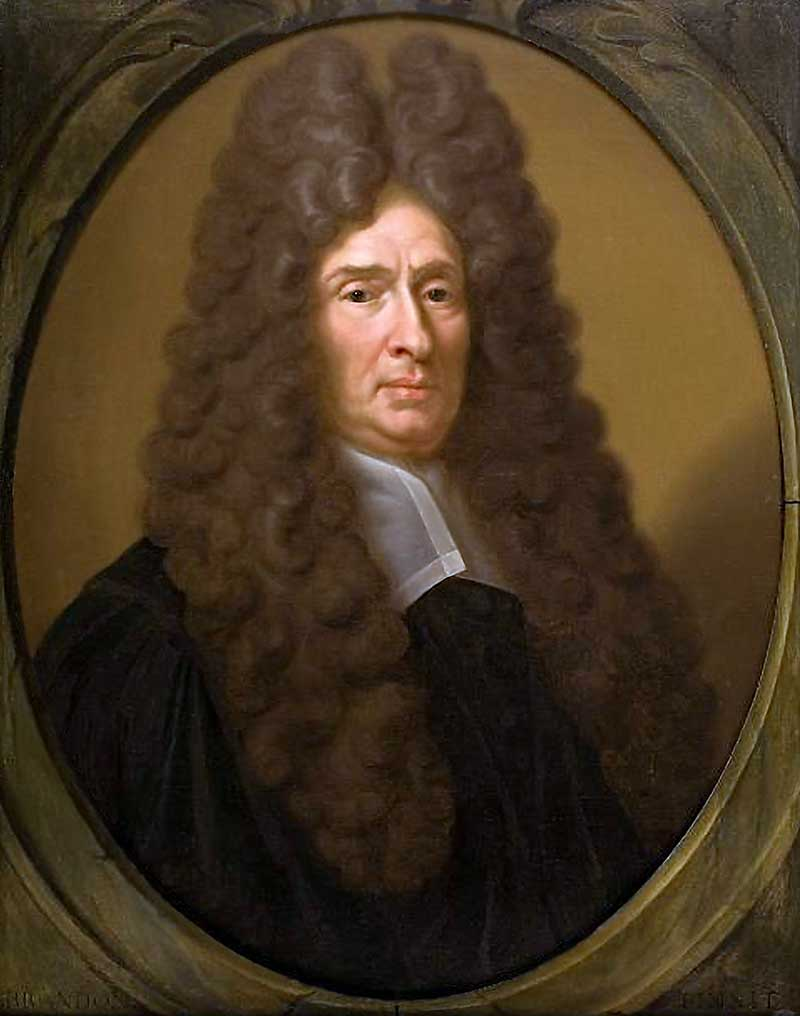
Philipp Reinhard Vitriarius

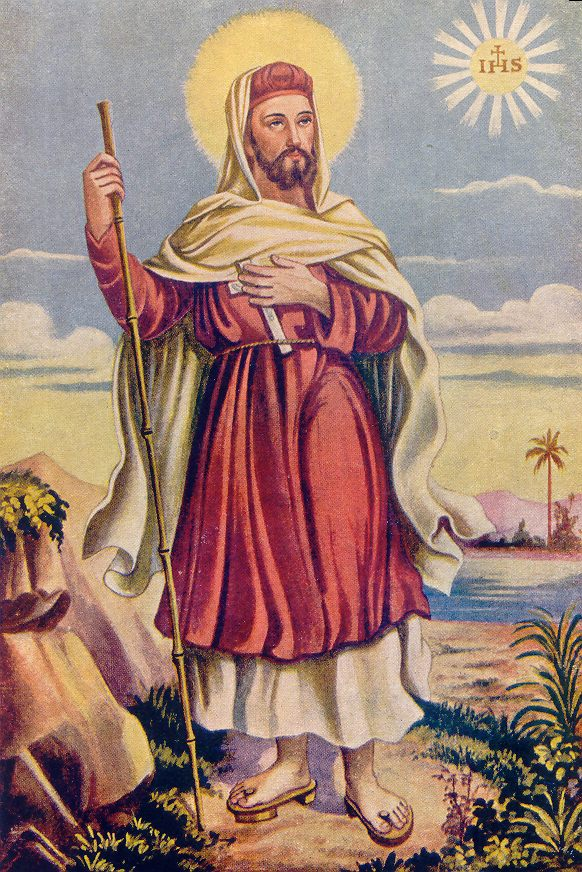
John de Brito

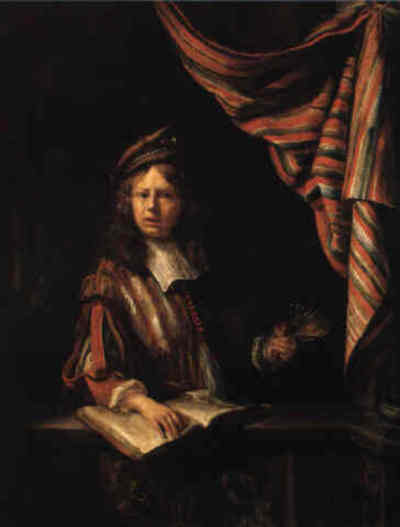
Matthijs Naiveu

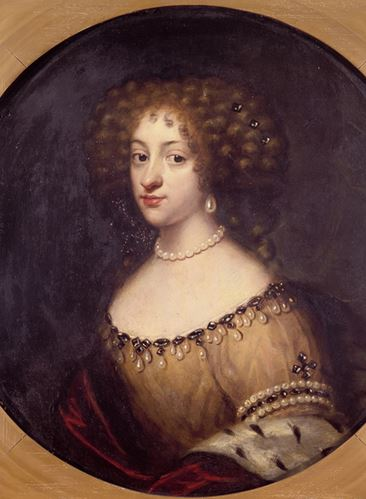
Princess Anna Sophie of Denmark

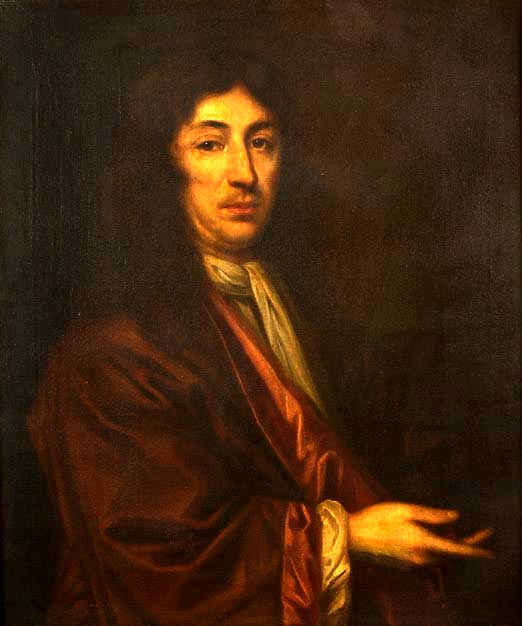
Joseph Dudley

- January 2 – Nathaniel Bacon, Virginia colonist, rebel (d. 1676)
- January 6
  - Christian William I, Prince of Schwarzburg-Sondershausen (1666–1720) (d. 1721)
  - William Wall, English theologian (d. 1728)
- January 7 – Wilhelm Ludwig, Duke of Württemberg (d. 1677)
- February 11 – Elisabeth Charlotte of Anhalt-Harzgerode, by marriage Duchess of Schleswig-Holstein-Sonderburg-Plön-Norburg (d. 1723)
- February 17
  - William Hay, Scottish clergyman and prelate (d. 1707)
  - Philipp Reinhard Vitriarius, German lawyer (d. 1720)
- February 18 – Denis-Nicolas Le Nourry, French Benedictine scholar (d. 1724)
- March 1 – John de Brito, Portuguese Jesuit missionary and martyr (d. 1693)
- March 12 – Victor-Maurice, comte de Broglie, French soldier and general (d. 1727)
- March 17 – Johann Wolfgang Jäger, German theologian (d. 1720)
- March 19 – Anna Elisabeth of Anhalt-Bernburg, duchess consort of Württemberg-Bernstadt (d. 1680)
- March 20 – Jean de Hautefeuille, French cleric, scientist (d. 1724)
- April 1 – John Wilmot, 2nd Earl of Rochester, English poet and courtier of King Charles II's Restoration court (d. 1680)
- April 2 – Maria Sibylla Merian, German-born naturalist and scientific illustrator (d. 1717)
- April 3 – Sir Thomas Littleton, 3rd Baronet, English statesman (d. 1709)
- April 16 – Matthijs Naiveu, Dutch painter (d. 1726)
- April 18 – Elias Brenner, Finnish artist (d. 1717)
- April 26 – William Ashhurst, Lord Mayor of London (1693–1694) (d. 1720)
- May 20 – Basilius Petritz, German composer and Kreuzkirche (d. 1715)
- June 3 – Johanna Walpurgis of Leiningen-Westerburg, German noblewoman, by marriage Duchess of Saxe-Weissenfels (d. 1687)
- June 17 – James Kendall, English soldier, politician (d. 1708)
- June 19 – Miles Gale, English antiquarian (d. 1721)
- June 20 – John George III, Elector of Saxony (d. 1691)
- June 22 – Ivan Ratkaj, Croatian Jesuit missionary and explorer (d. 1683)
- July 2 – Daniel Finch, 2nd Earl of Nottingham, English privy councillor (d. 1730)
- July 8 – Frances Stewart, Duchess of Richmond, member of the Court of the Restoration, famous for refusing to become a mistress of Charles II of England (d. 1702)
- July 22 – Margaret Mary Alacoque, French Catholic nun, mystic and saint (d. 1690)
- July 23 – Luise Marie of the Palatinate, German princess (d. 1679)
- July 29 – Carl Piper, Swedish politician (d. 1716)
- August 4 – Giovanni II Cornaro, Venetian nobleman and statesman (d. 1722)
- August 12
  - Johann Heinrich Acker, German writer (d. 1719)
  - Eberhard Werner Happel, German author (d. 1690)
- August 22 – Denis Papin, French inventor (d. 1713)
- August 28 – Erik Carlsson Sjöblad, Swedish governor, admiral, and baron (d. 1725)
- August 31 – Mary Scott, 3rd Countess of Buccleuch, young Scottish peeress (d. 1661)
- September 1 – Princess Anna Sophie of Denmark, daughter of King Frederick III of Denmark (d. 1717)
- September 4 – Gerhard Noodt, Dutch jurist (d. 1725)
- September 23
  - Joseph Dudley, colonial Governor of Massachusetts (d. 1720)
  - Frederick VII, Margrave of Baden-Durlach from 1677 until his death (d. 1709)
- October 3 – Johannes Voet, Dutch legal scholar (d. 1713)
- November 11
  - Johann Wilhelm Baier, German theologian (d. 1695)
  - Johannes Voorhout, Dutch painter (d. 1723)
- November 18 – Pierre Bayle, French philosopher (d. 1706)
- November 20 – Huchtenburg, Dutch painter (d. 1733)
- November 26 – Marie Hedwig of Hesse-Darmstadt, Duchess consort of Saxe-Meiningen (1671–1680) (d. 1680)
- November 27 – Badr-un-Nissa, daughter of Mughal emperor Aurangzeb and Nawab Bai (d. 1670)
- November 28 – Constantin Marselis, Danish baron (d. 1699)
- December 4 – Daniel Eberlin, German composer (d. 1715)
- December 7
  - Giovanni Ceva, Italian mathematician (d. 1734)
  - Francesco del Giudice, Italian Catholic cardinal (d. 1725)
- December 11
  - Jacob Johan Hastfer, Swedish officer, governor of Livonia (d. 1695)
  - David van der Plas, Dutch painter (d. 1704)
- December 22 – Nicholas Noyes, Massachusetts colonial minister, during the time of the Salem witch trials (d. 1717)
- December 30 – Jean Martianay, French Benedictine scholar (d. 1717)
- Henry Aldrich, English theologian and philosopher (d. 1710)
- Constantine Phaulkon, Greek adventurer (d. 1688)
- Elisabeth Hevelius, Polish astronomer (d. 1693)

1648

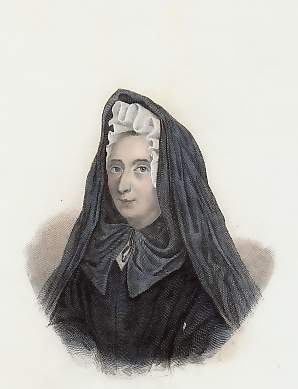
Jeanne Guyon

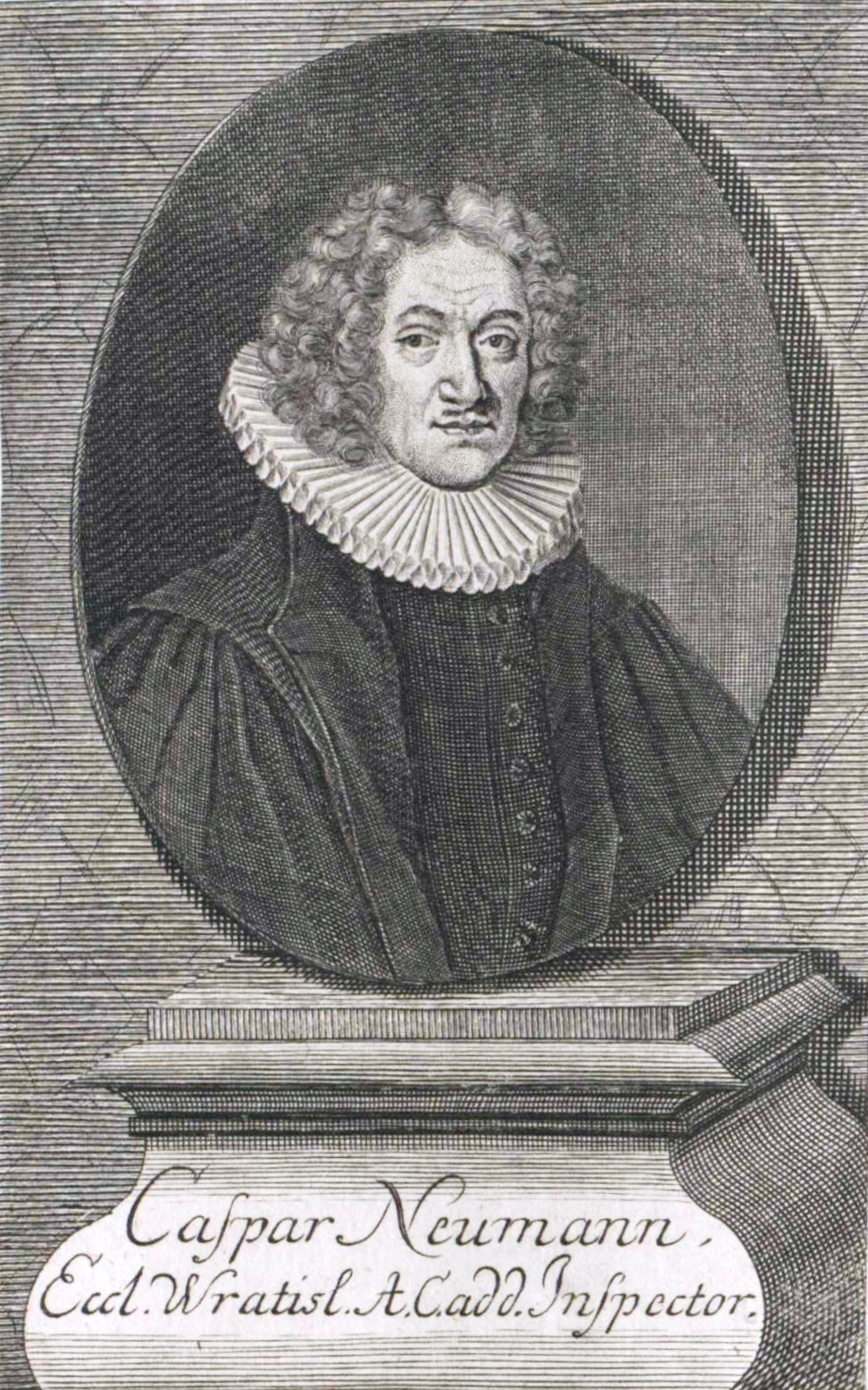
Caspar Neumann

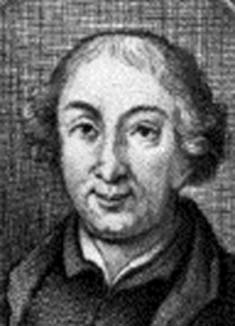
Tommaso Ceva

- January 1 – Matthijs Wulfraet, Dutch painter (d. 1727)
- January 14 – Clara Elisabeth von Platen, German noblewoman (d. 1700)
- February 1 – Elkanah Settle, English poet and playwright (d. 1724)
- February 23 – Arabella Churchill, English mistress of James II of England (d. 1730)
- February 26 – George Albert II, Count of Erbach-Fürstenau, held the fiefs of Fürstenau (d. 1717)
- March 2 – John Hales, English politician (d. 1723)
- March 5 – David Caspari, German Lutheran theologian (d. 1702)
- March 7 – Charles-Amador Martin, Canadian Catholic priest (d. 1711)
- March 12 – Charles de Sévigné, French baron (d. 1713)
- March 13 – Anne Henriette of Bavaria, Duchess of Guise (d. 1723)
- March 31 – Sebastiaen van Aken, Flemish painter (d. 1722)
- April 4 – Grinling Gibbons, Dutch-British sculptor and wood carver known for his work in England (d. 1721)
- April 5 – Nicolas Pasquin, early pioneer in New France (now Quebec) (d. 1708)
- April 7 – John Sheffield, 1st Duke of Buckingham and Normanby, English statesman and poet (d. 1721)
- April 8 – Charles, Count of Marsan, French noble (d. 1708)
- April 9 – Henri de Massue, Marquis de Ruvigny, 1st Earl of Galway, French soldier and diplomat (d. 1720)
- April 13 – Jeanne Marie Bouvier de la Motte Guyon, French mystic (d. 1717)
- April 16 – Antoine de Pas de Feuquières, French soldier (d. 1711)
- April 20 – Maurice Bocland, English Member of Parliament (d. 1710)
- April 23 – Philip Verheyen, Flemish physician (d. 1710)
- April 26 – King Peter II of Portugal (d. 1706)
- May 12 – Philip Foley, English politician (d. 1716)
- May 14 – René de Froulay de Tessé, French Marshal and diplomat (d. 1725)
- May 15 – William, Landgrave of Hesse-Rotenburg (from 1683) (d. 1725)
- May 23 – Johan Teyler, Dutch painter (d. 1709)
- May 24 – Albert V, Duke of Saxe-Coburg (d. 1699)
- June 18 – Petrus Houttuyn, Dutch botanist (d. 1709)
- July 2 – Arp Schnitger, German organ builder (d. 1719)
- July 19 – Jakub Kresa, Czech mathematician (d. 1715)
- July 21 – John Graham, 1st Viscount Dundee, Scottish general (d. 1689)
- July 25 – Joseph Anthelmi, French ecclesiastical historian (d. 1697)
- July 30 – Anne Marie Thérèse de Lorraine, Abbess of Remiremont (d. 1661)
- August 5 – Guichard Joseph Duverney, French anatomist (d. 1730)
- August 9 – Johann Michael Bach, German composer (d. 1694)
- August 11 – Jeremiah Shepard, American Puritan minister and the youngest son of Thomas Shepard (d. 1720)
- August 14 – Alphonse Henri, Count of Harcourt, French noble (d. 1718)
- August 22
  - Gerard Hoet, Dutch painter (d. 1733)
  - Tsarevich Dmitry Alexeyevich of Russia, first son and heir of Tsar Alexis of Russia (d. 1649)
- August 30 – Jean-Baptiste Morvan de Bellegarde, French Jesuit (d. 1734)
- September 2 – Magdalena Sibylle of Saxe-Weissenfels, German noblewoman (d. 1681)
- September 3 – Sarah Cloyce, American accused of witchcraft (d. 1703)
- September 6 – Johann Schelle, German composer (d. 1701)
- September 10 – Nicolas Desmarets, Controller-General of Finances under Louis XIV of France (d. 1721)
- September 14
  - Louis Nicolas le Tonnelier de Breteuil, French noble (d. 1728)
  - Caspar Neumann, German professor and clergyman (d. 1715)
- September 24 – Richard Graham, 1st Viscount Preston, English politician (d. 1695)
- September 27
  - Charles Gustav of Baden-Durlach, German general (d. 1703)
  - Michelangelo Tamburini, Italian Jesuit Superior General (d. 1730)
- October 3 – Élisabeth Sophie Chéron, French musician (d. 1711)
- October 6 – Henrietta Catharina, Baroness von Gersdorff, German noblewoman; poet (d. 1726)
- October 13 – Françoise Madeleine d'Orléans, French princess (d. 1664)
- October 19 – Domenico Viva, Italian Jesuit theologian (d. 1726)
- October 22 – Aleijda Wolfsen, Dutch Golden Age painter (d. 1692)
- October 29 – John Verelst, Dutch Golden Age painter (d. 1734)
- November 12
  - Louis-Hector de Callière, French politician (d. 1703)
  - Juana Inés de la Cruz, Mexican Hieronymite nun and polymath (d. 1695)
- November 15 – Juan María de Salvatierra, Italian Jesuit priest and missionary (d. 1717)
- November 16 – Charles Duncombe, English banker and politician (d. 1711)
- November 24 – Humphrey Humphreys, British bishop (d. 1712)
- November 27 – Petrus Codde, Dutch cleric, first Old Catholic bishop (d. 1710)
- December 5 – Charles François d'Angennes, Marquis de Maintenon, French nobleman, Caribbean buccaneer (d. 1691)
- December 6 – Leonard Goffiné, German Catholic priest and writer (d. 1719)
- December 15 – Gregory King, English statistician (d. 1712)
- December 20 – Tommaso Ceva, Italian Jesuit mathematician from Milan (d. 1737)
- December 23 – Robert Barclay, Scottish Quaker (d. 1690)
- John Coode, Colonial governor of Maryland (d. 1709)
- Lionel Copley, colonial governor of Maryland (d. 1693)
- Anne de Rohan-Chabot, short-term mistress of Louis XIV of France (d. 1709)
- Kong Shangren, Qing Chinese dramatist and poet (d. 1718).

1649 * January 12 – Jacques Carrey, French painter (d. 1726)

- January 18
  - William Maurice, Prince of Nassau-Siegen (1679–1691) (d. 1691)
  - John Waddon, English politician (d. 1695)
- January 22 – Pascal Collasse, French composer (d. 1709)
- January 30 – Lionel Tollemache, 3rd Earl of Dysart, British politician and nobleman (d. 1727)
- February 6
  - John Benedict, Connecticut politician and deacon (d. 1729)
  - Augusta Marie of Holstein-Gottorp, Consort of Frederick VII, Margrave of Baden-Durlach (d. 1728)
- February 8 – Gabriel Daniel, French Jesuit historian (d. 1728)
- February 11 – William Carstares, Scottish minister (d. 1715)
- February 16 – Antonio Lupis, prolific Italian writer (d. 1701)
- February 19 – Daniel Erich, German organist and composer (d. 1712)
- February 22 – Bon Boullogne, French painter (d. 1717)
- February 25 – Johann Philipp Krieger, German Baroque composer (d. 1725)
- March 2 – Andreas Gottlieb von Bernstorff, German politician (d. 1726)
- March 3 – John Floyer, English physician and author (d. 1734)
- March 12 – Govert Bidloo, Dutch physician, anatomist, poet and playwright (d. 1713)
- March 13 – Simon Henry, Count of Lippe-Detmold (1666–1697) (d. 1697)
- March 19 – Marie Morin, New France nun and historian (d. 1730)
- March 30 – John Trenchard, English politician (d. 1695)
- April 5 – Elihu Yale, American benefactor of Yale University (d. 1721)
- April 8 – Charles Berkeley, 2nd Earl of Berkeley, English diplomat (d. 1710)
- April 9 – James Scott, 1st Duke of Monmouth, claimant to the thrones of England, Scotland and Ireland (d. 1685)
- April 11 – Princess Frederica Amalia of Denmark, daughter of King Frederick III of Denmark (d. 1704)
- April 16 – Jan Luyken, Dutch engraver (d. 1712)
- April 17 – Charles Henri, Prince of Commercy (d. 1723)
- April 23 – Andreas Kneller, German organist and composer (d. 1724)
- May 2
  - Engel de Ruyter, Dutch admiral (d. 1683)
  - Joseph Ball, American settler, public servant, and maternal grandfather of George Washington (d. 1711)
- May 3 – Johann Valentin Meder, German composer (d. 1719)
- May 4
  - Chhatrasal, Maharaja of Madhya Pradesh (d. 1731)
  - Augustinus Terwesten, Northern Netherlandish painter (d. 1711)
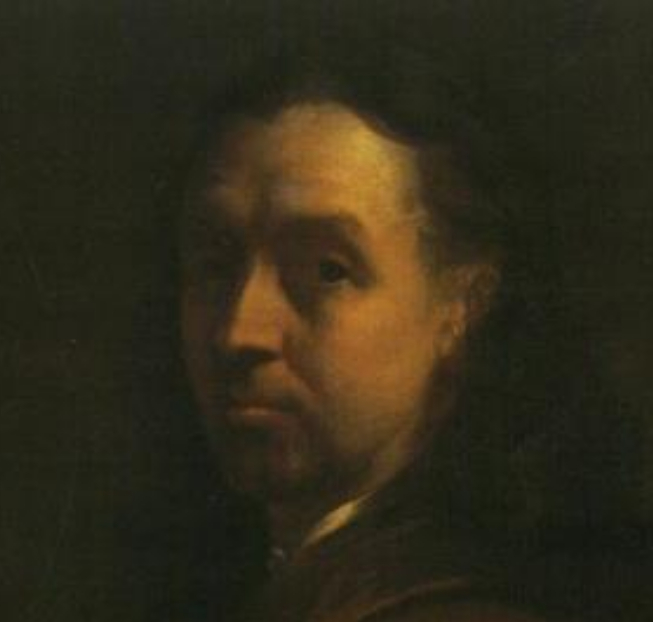
    Augustinus Terwesten
- May 15 – Vincent Bigot, Superior general of the Jesuit mission in Canada (d. 1720)
- June 13 – Adrien Baillet, French scholar and critic (d. 1706)

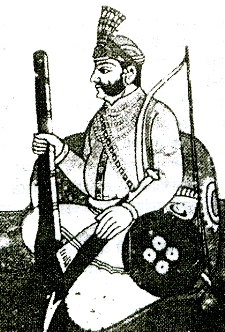
Chhatrasal

- July 1 – Johann Wilhelm Petersen, German theologian (d. 1727)
- July 4
  - Sophie Amalie Lindenov, Danish noblewoman and landowner (d. 1688)
  - William Lodge, English engraver and printmaker (d. 1689)
- July 19 – Charles, Landgrave of Hesse-Wanfried since 1676 (d. 1711)
- July 20 – William Bentinck, 1st Earl of Portland (d. 1709)
- July 23 – Pope Clement XI (d. 1721)
- August 3 – Diego de Salinas, Governor of Gibraltar (d. 1720)
- August 7 – Archduke Charles Joseph of Austria, Roman Catholic bishop (d. 1664)
- August 16 – Barent van Kalraet, Dutch painter (d. 1737)
- August 27 – Ferdinando d'Adda, Italian Catholic cardinal (d. 1719)

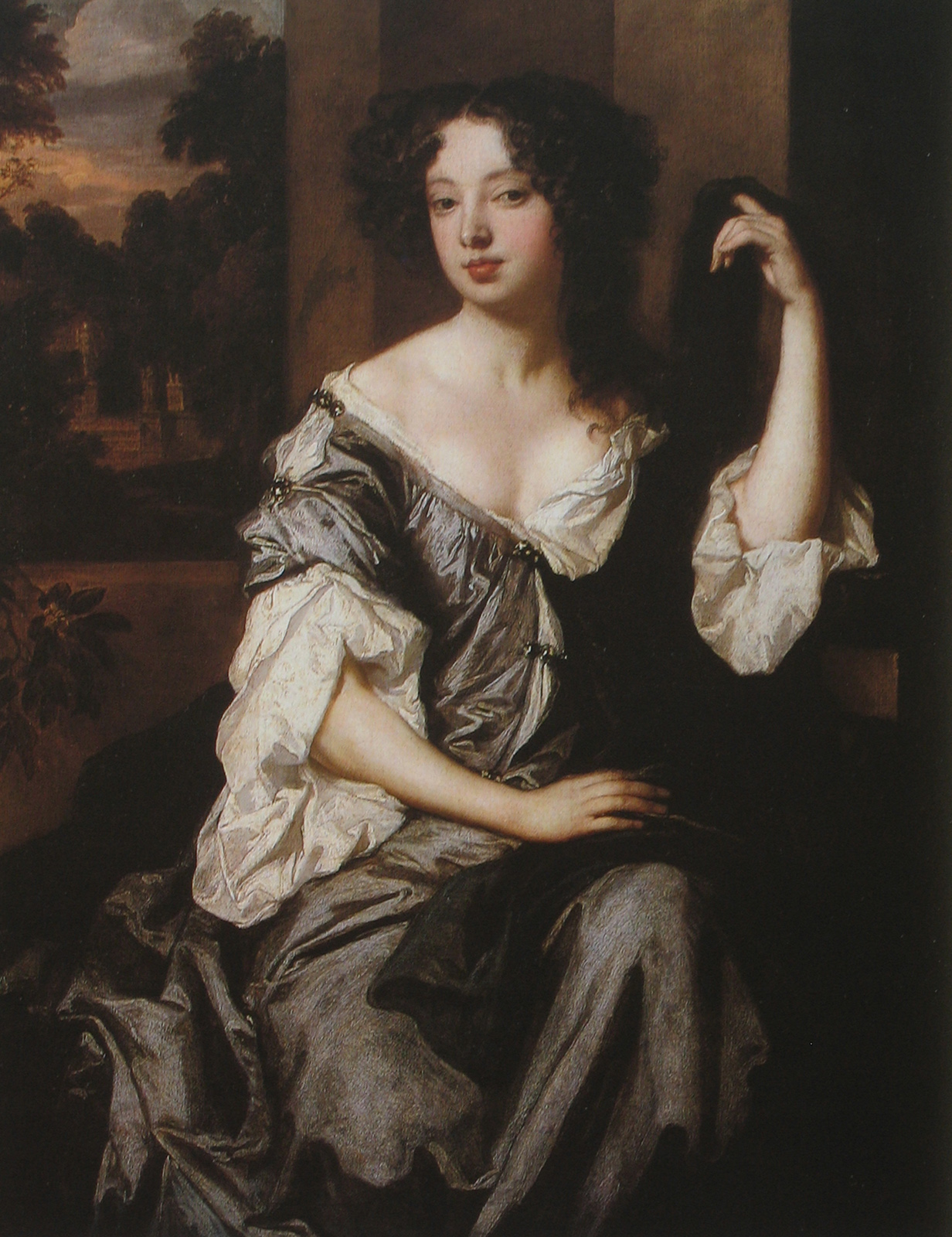
Louise de Kérouaille, Duchess of Portsmouth

- September 5 – Louise de Kérouaille, Duchess of Portsmouth, French-born mistress of Charles II of England (d. 1734)
- September 7 – Charles Lambart, 3rd Earl of Cavan, Irish peer (d. 1702)
- September 10 – Bernhard I, Duke of Saxe-Meiningen since 1675 (d. 1706)
- September 12
  - Sir Thomas Blount, 1st Baronet, English politician (d. 1687)
  - Dionysius Andreas Freher, German mystic (d. 1728)
  - Giuseppe Maria Tomasi, Sicilian saint (d. 1713)
- September 14 – Magdalena Stenbock, Swedish salon hostess (d. 1727)
- September 15 – Titus Oates, English clergyman and plotter (d. 1705)
- September 20 – Carr Scrope, English poet (d. 1680)
- September 25 – Edward Montagu, British politician (d. 1690)
- September 26 – Katharyne Lescailje, Dutch writer (d. 1711)
- September 27 – Jonas Danilssønn Ramus, Norwegian priest and historian (d. 1718)

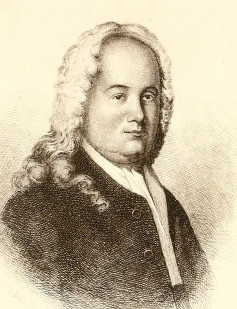
Samuel Carpenter

- October 3 – Franz Mozart, German mason, great-grandfather of Wolfgang Amadeus Mozart (d. 1693)
- October 6 – Juana Rangel de Cuéllar, Spanish founder of Colombian city (d. 1736)
- October 12 – Sir Thomas Felton, 4th Baronet, English politician (d. 1709)
- October 19 – Samuel Rodigast, German poet, hymnwriter (d. 1708)
- October 25 – Sir Edward Blackett, 2nd Baronet, English politician (d. 1718)
- November 2
  - Johann Adolf I, Duke of Saxe-Weissenfels, German duke (d. 1697)
  - Esmé Stewart, 2nd Duke of Richmond, son of James Stewart (d. 1660)
- November 4 – Samuel Carpenter, Deputy Governor of colonial Pennsylvania (d. 1714)
- November 24 – John Holwell, English mathematician, astrologer (d. 1680)
- December 2 – Jean-Baptiste Corneille, French historical painter, etcher and engraver (d. 1695)
- December 9 – Sir Orlando Bridgeman, 1st Baronet, of Ridley (d. 1701)
- Esther Liebmann, German banker (d. 1714)

== Deaths ==
1640

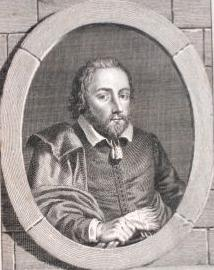
Philip Massinger

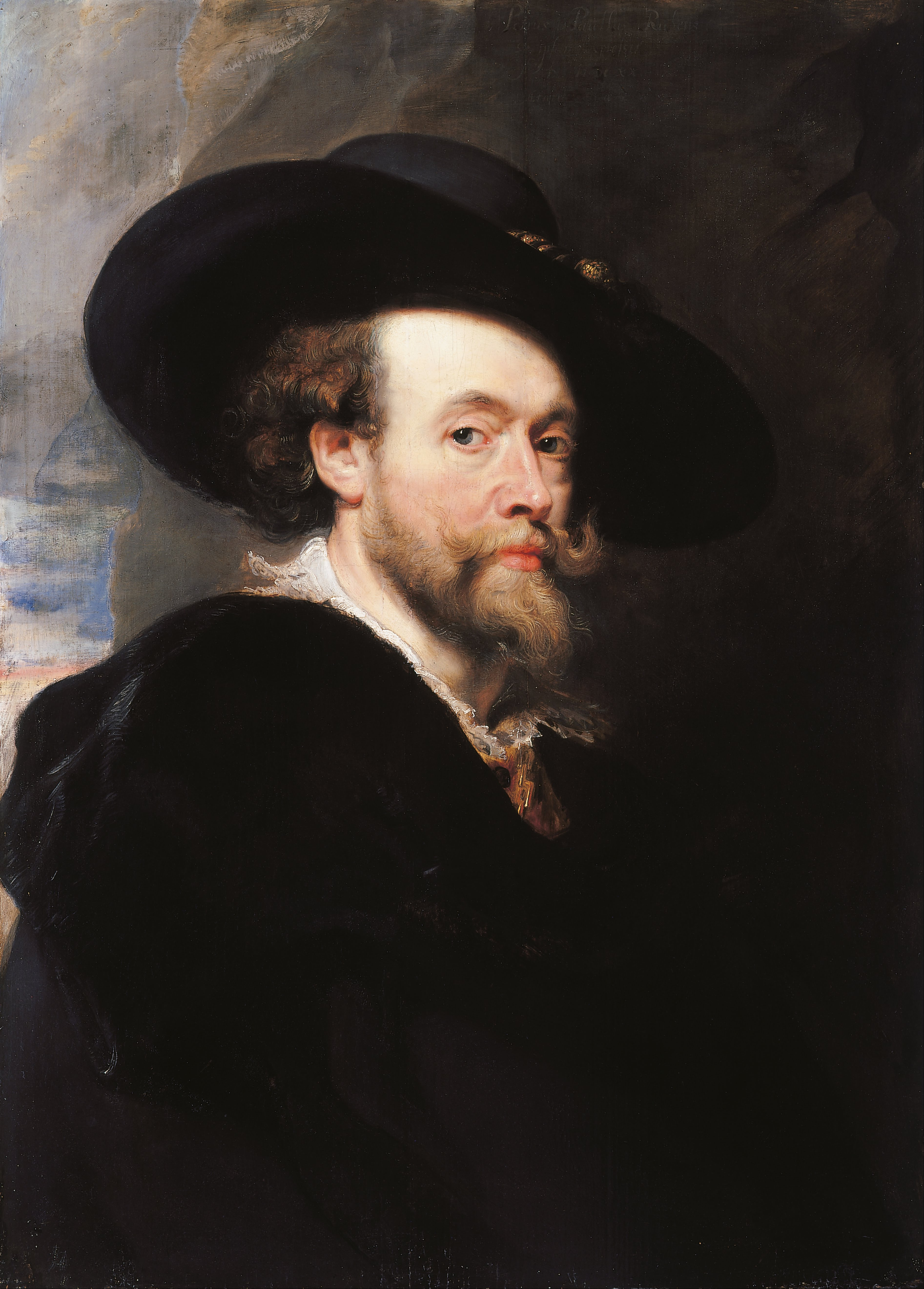
Peter Paul Rubens

- January 1 – Johann Wilhelm Baur, German artist (b. 1607)
- January 14 – Thomas Coventry, 1st Baron Coventry, English lawyer and judge (b. 1578)
- January 25 – Robert Burton, English scholar (b. 1577)
- January 26 – Jindřich Matyáš Thurn, Swedish general (b. 1567)
- February 2 – Jeanne de Lestonnac, French saint (b. 1556)
- February 9 – Murad IV, Ottoman Sultan (b. 1612)
- March 13 – Isaac Manasses de Pas, Marquis de Feuquieres, French soldier (b. 1590)
- March 17 – Philip Massinger, English dramatist (b. 1583)
- March 20 – Michael Reyniersz Pauw, Dutch businessman (b. 1590)
- April – Uriel da Costa, Portuguese philosopher (suicide) (b. 1585)
- April 2 – Paul Fleming, German physician and poet (b. 1609)
- April 5 – Petrus Kirstenius, German physician and orientalist (b. 1577)
- April 7 – Wilhelm Kettler, Duke of Courland (b. 1574)
- April 10 – Agostino Agazzari, Italian composer (b. 1578)
- April 16 – Countess Charlotte Flandrina of Nassau (b. 1579)
- May 29 – Elisabet Juliana Banér, Swedish noble (b. 1600)
- May 30 – Peter Paul Rubens, Flemish painter (b. 1577)
- May 31 – Zeynab Begum, Safavid princess (date of birth unknown)
- June 3 – Theophilus Howard, 2nd Earl of Suffolk, English politician (b. 1584)
- July 13 – Henry Casimir I of Nassau-Dietz, Stadtholder of Groningen, Friesland and Drenthe (b. 1612)
- July 25 – Fabio Colonna, Italian scientist (b. 1567)
- August 30 – Thomas Hamilton, 2nd Earl of Haddington, Scottish noble (b. 1600)
- September 10 – Anthony Abdy, English merchant (b. 1579)
- September 25 – Philippe-Charles, 3rd Count of Arenberg (b. 1587)
- September 30
  - Charles, Duke of Guise (b. 1571)
  - Jacopo da Empoli, Italian painter (b. 1551)
- October 1 – Claudio Achillini, Italian philosopher, theologian, mathematician, poet, jurist (b. 1574)
- October 6
  - Wolrad IV, Count of Waldeck-Eisenberg (b. 1588)
  - Christian Ulrik Gyldenløve, Danish diplomat and military officer (b. 1611)
- October 7 – Lord William Howard, English nobleman (b. 1563)
- October 19 – Aubert Miraeus, Belgian historian (b. 1573)
- October 20 – John Ball, English Puritan clergyman (b. 1585)
- November 5 – Anne of England, daughter of King Charles I (b. 1637)
- November 19 – Krzysztof Radziwiłł, Polish nobleman (b. 1585)
- November 22 – Mario Minniti, Italian artist (b. 1577)
- November 27 – Gabriel Gustafsson Oxenstierna, Swedish statesman (b. 1587)
- December 1
  - Pieter van den Broecke, Dutch merchant (b. 1585)
  - George William, Elector of Brandenburg (b. 1595)
  - Miguel de Vasconcelos, Portuguese prime minister (b. 1590)
- December 3 – Christopher Wandesford, English administrator and politician (b. 1592)
- December 15 – Willem Baudartius, Dutch theologian (b. 1565)
- December 22 – Claude de Bullion, French Minister of Finance (b. 1569)
- December 30 – John Francis Regis, French saint (b. 1597)
- December 31 – Ernest Christopher, Count of Rietberg (1625–1640) (b. 1606)
- date unknown
  - Bombogor, Evenk chief
  - Adriana Basile, Italian composer (b. 1580)

1641

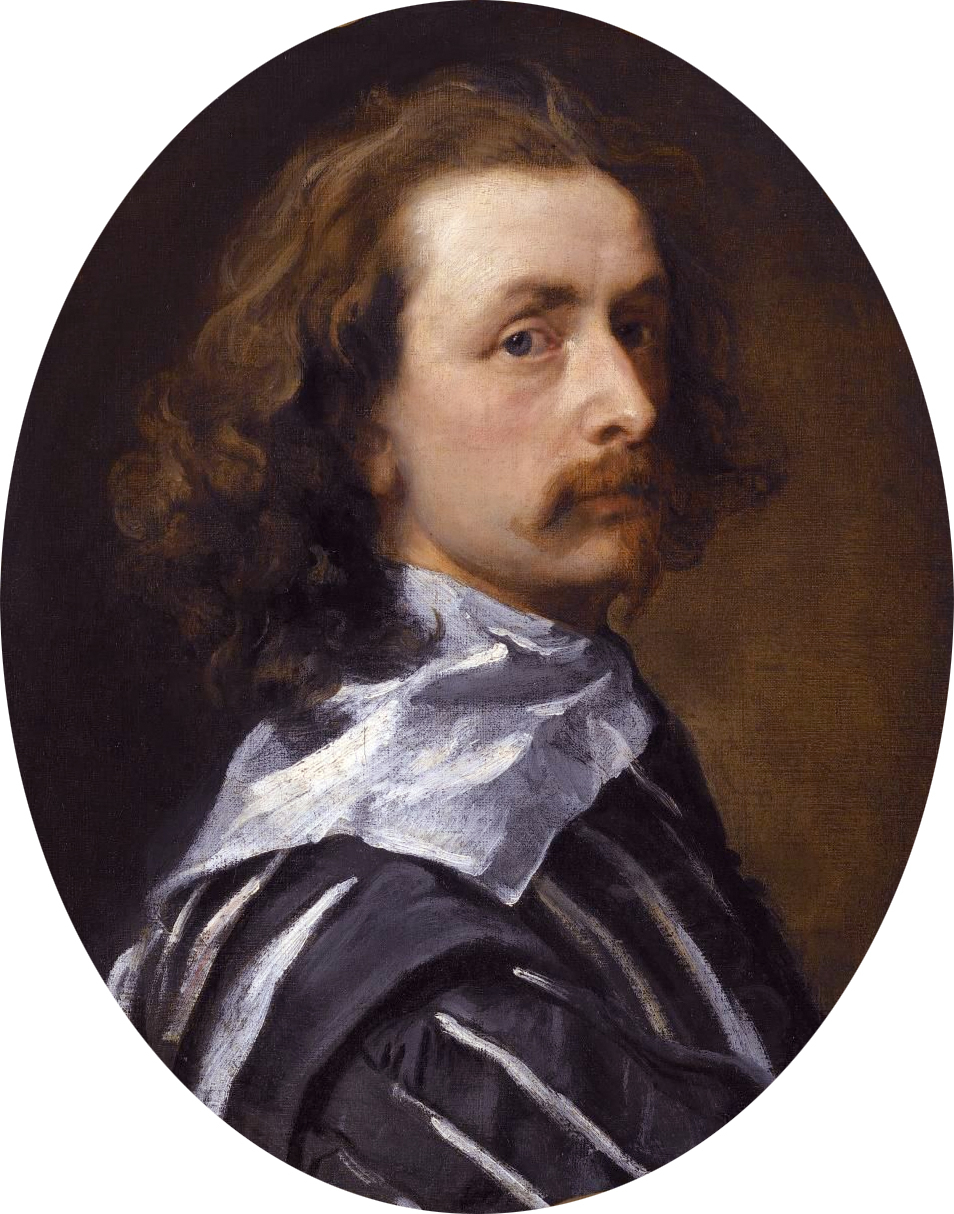
Anthony van Dyck

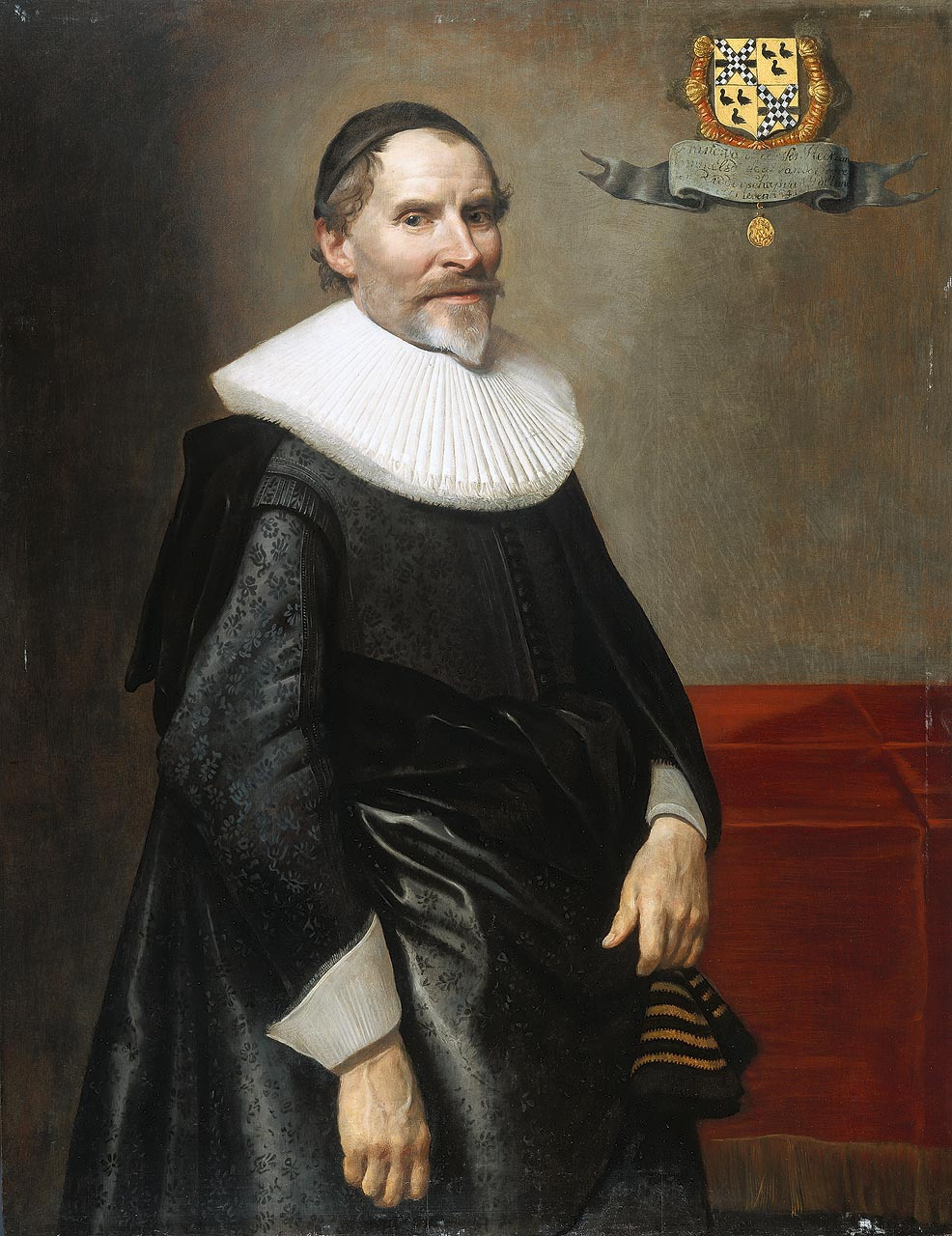
Francis van Aarssens

- January 3 – Jeremiah Horrocks, English astronomer (b. c. 1618)
- January 9 – Gustavus Adolphus of the Palatinate, German noble (b. 1632)
- January 11
  - Juan de Jáuregui, Spanish poet and painter (b. 1583)
  - Franciscus Gomarus, Dutch theologian (b. 1563)
- February 15 – Sara Copia Sullam, Italian poet and writer (b. 1592)
- February 17 – Krisztina Nyáry, Hungarian noblewoman (b. 1604)
- February 24 – Francesco Usper, Italian composer (b. 1561)
- February 27 – Pau Claris i Casademunt, Catalan ecclesiastic (b. 1586)
- March 8 – Xu Xiake, Chinese adventurer and geographer (b. 1587)
- March 14 – Adam, Count of Schwarzenberg, German politician (b. 1583)
- March 23 – Claude Bernard, French priest (b. 1588)
- April 6 – Domenico Zampieri (Domenichino), Italian painter (b. 1581)
- April 13 – Richard Montagu, English clergyman (b. 1577)
- April 27 – Wilhelm von Rath, German soldier and scholar (b. 1585)
- May 10 – Johan Banér, Swedish soldier (b. 1596)
- May 12 – Thomas Wentworth, 1st Earl of Strafford, English statesman (b. 1593)
- June 1 – Carlo Emanuele Pio di Savoia, Italian Catholic cardinal (b. 1585)
- July 4
  - István Esterházy Hungarian noble (b. 1616)
  - Pedro Teixeira, Portuguese explorer
- July 6
  - Livia della Rovere, Italian noble (b. 1585)
  - Louis, Count of Soissons (b. 1604)
- July 8 – Balthasar I Moretus, Flemish printer (b. 1574)
- July 13 – Nicolaes le Febure, Dutch Golden Age member of the Haarlem schutterij (b. 1589)
- July 21 – Thomas Mun, English writer on economics (b. 1571)
- July 24 – Giovanni Francesco Guidi di Bagno, Italian cardinal (b. 1578)
- August 4 – Otto III, Duke of Brunswick-Harburg (b. 1572)
- August 9 – Augustine Baker, Welsh Benedictine mystic (b. 1575)
- August 16 – Thomas Heywood, English playwright (b. c. 1573)
- August 26 – Jean-Jacques Bouchard, 17th-century French writer (b. 1606)
- September 10 – Ambrose Barlow, English Catholic martyr (b. 1585) (executed)
- September 12 – John Upton, English politician (b. 1590)
- October 3 – Étienne Martellange, French architect (b. 1569)
- October 31 – Cornelis Jol, Dutch naval commander and privateer (b. 1597)
- November 9
  - Cardinal-Infante Ferdinand of Austria, Governor of the Netherlands and Bishop of Toledo (b. c. 1609)
  - Maren Spliid, Danish alleged witch (b. c. 1600) (executed)
- November 11 – Christopher Clitherow, Lord Mayor of London and Member of Parliament (b. 1578)
- November 12 – Philipp Ludwig III, Count of Hanau-Münzenberg (1638–1641) (b. 1632)
- November 26 – Hedwig of Denmark, Danish princess (b. 1581)
- December 3 – John Percy, English priest (b. 1569)
- December 9 – Sir Anthony van Dyck, Flemish painter (b. 1599)
- December 22 – Maximilien de Béthune, Duke of Sully, 2nd Prime Minister of France (b. 1560)
- December 27 – Francis van Aarssens, Dutch diplomat (b. 1572)
- Estêvão de Brito, Portuguese composer (b. c. 1570)
- Arthur Johnston, Scottish physician and poet (b. c. 1579)
- Mukai Shogen Tadakatsu, Japanese admiral (b. 1582)
- Harjol, Chinese concubine of Hong Taiji (b. 1609)

1642

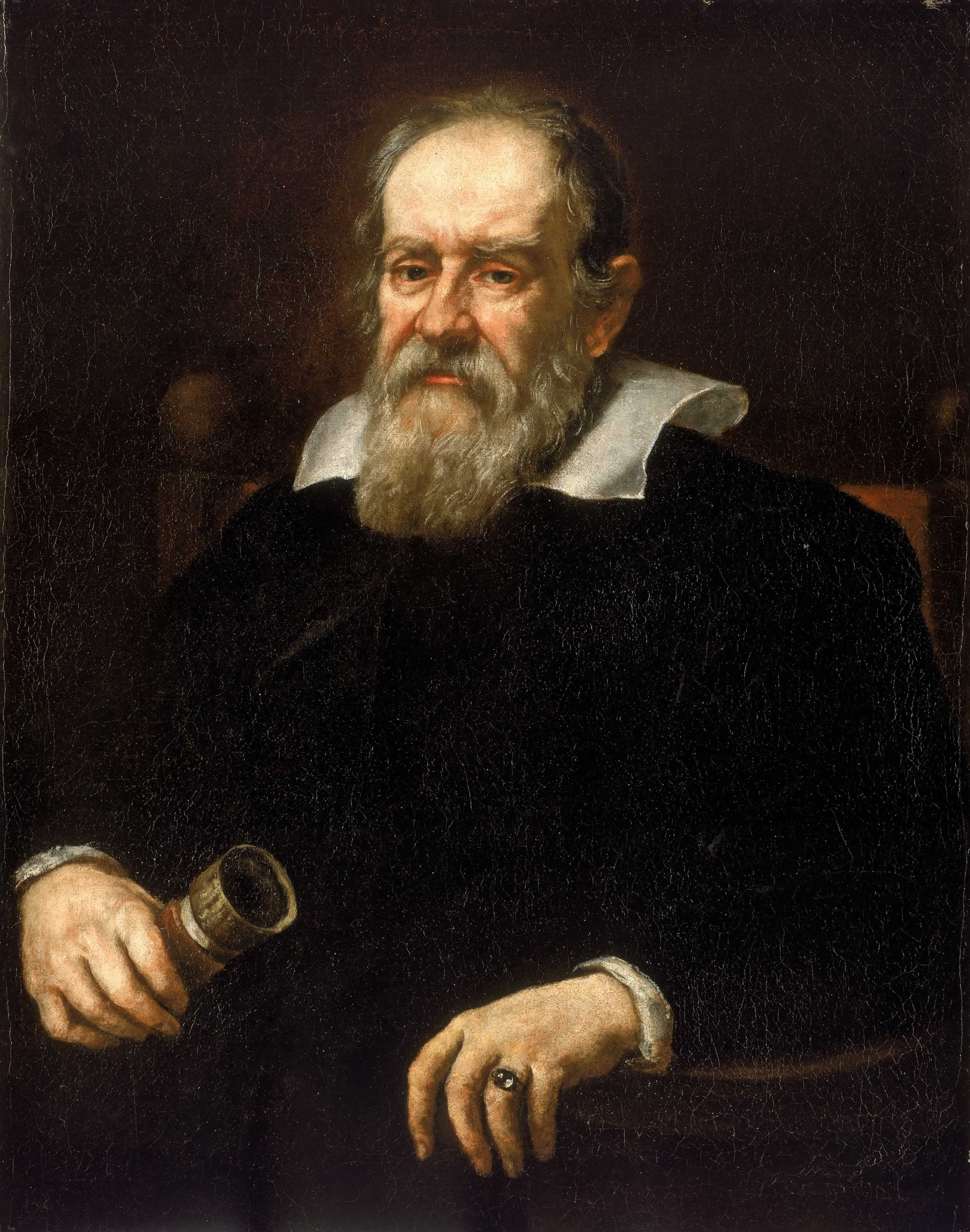
Galileo Galilei

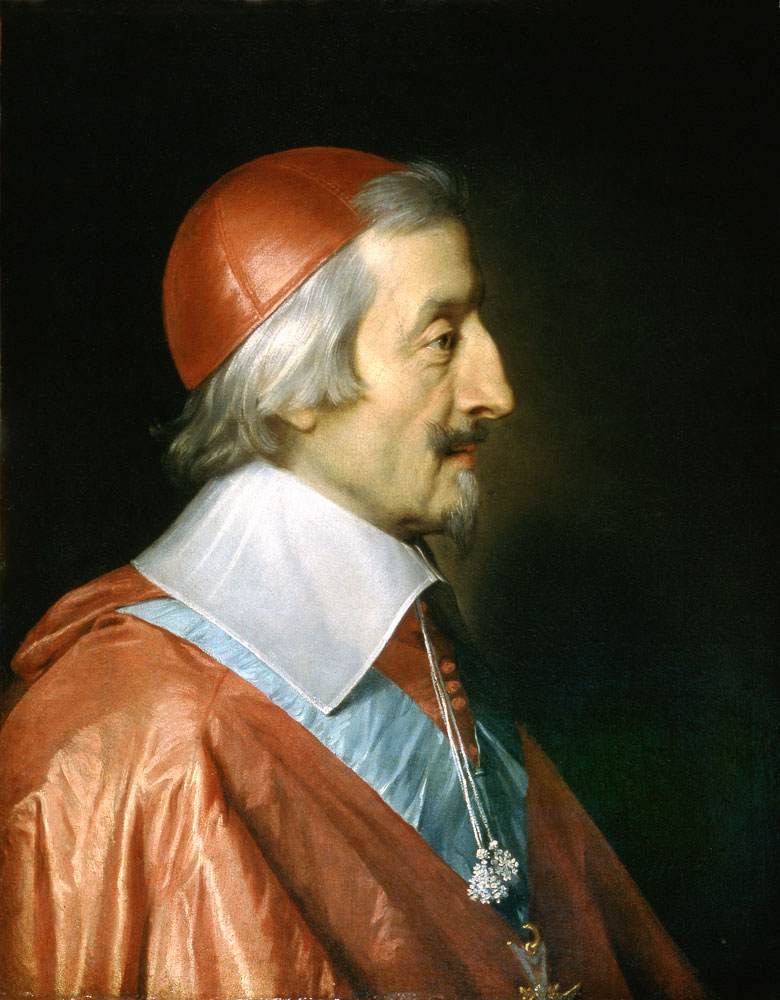
Cardinal Richelieu

- January 8 – Galileo Galilei, Italian astronomer and physicist (b. 1564)
- January 12 – Johann Ernst, Count of Hanau-Münzenberg (1641–1642) (b. 1613)
- January 13 – Sophia Hedwig of Brunswick-Lüneburg, German noblewoman (b. 1592)
- January 21 – Alban Roe, English Benedictine martyr (b. 1583)
- February 7 – William Bedell, English clergyman (b. 1571)
- February 19 – Jørgen Knudsen Urne, Danish noble (b. 1598)
- March 30 – William Augustus, Duke of Brunswick-Harburg (b. 1564)
- April 30 – Dmitry Pozharsky, Russian prince (b. 1578)
- May 9 – Jacques Bonfrère, Flemish Jesuit priest and biblical scholar (b. 1573)
- May 24 – Polyxena von Lobkowicz, politically active Czech aristocrat (b. 1566)
- June 14 – Saskia van Uylenburgh, wife and painter's model of Rembrandt (b. 1612)
- July 3 – Marie de' Medici, French queen consort and regent (b. 1573)
- July 4 – Erzsébet Thurzó, Hungarian noblewoman (b. 1621)
- July 5 – Festus Hommius, Dutch theologian (b. 1576)
- July 17 – William, Count of Nassau-Siegen, German count (b. 1592)
- July 25 – Crato, Count of Nassau-Saarbrücken (1640–1642) (b. 1621)
- July 30 – Franz von Hatzfeld, Prince-Bishop of Würzburg (b. 1596)
- August 18 – Guido Reni, Italian painter (b. 1575)
- September 3 – Countess Elisabeth of Nassau, regent of Sedan (b. 1577)
- September 8 – Herman de Neyt, Flemish painter (b. 1588)
- September 12 – Henri Coiffier de Ruzé, Marquis of Cinq-Mars, French conspirator, executed (b. 1620)
- September 29 – René Goupil, French Jesuit missionary, first of the Canadian Martyrs (b. 1608)
- October 3 – Charles Howard, 2nd Earl of Nottingham, English noble (b. 1579)
- October 19 – Giovanni Doria, Spanish noble (b. 1573)
- October 23 – George Stewart, 9th Seigneur d'Aubigny, Scottish nobleman and military commander (b. 1618)
- October 24 – Robert Bertie, 1st Earl of Lindsey, English Fen drainage adventurer and soldier (b. 1583)
- November 1 – Jean Nicolet, French explorer (b. 1598)
- November 7 – Henry Montagu, 1st Earl of Manchester, English politician (b. c. 1563)
- November 14 – Henry Wallop, English politician (b. 1568)
- November 24 – Walatta Petros, saint in the Ethiopian Orthodox Tewahedo Church (b. 1592)
- November 25 – Christian Günther I, Count of Schwarzburg-Sondershausen since 1601 (b. 1578)
- December 4 – Armand Jean du Plessis, Cardinal Richelieu, French statesman (b. 1585)
- December 6 – Charles Caesar, English politician and judge (b. 1590)
- December 23 – Louis de Dieu, Dutch theologian (b. 1590)
- December 27 – Herman op den Graeff, Dutch bishop (b. 1585)
- date unknown – Eudemus I of Georgia, Catholicos Patriarch, killed

1643

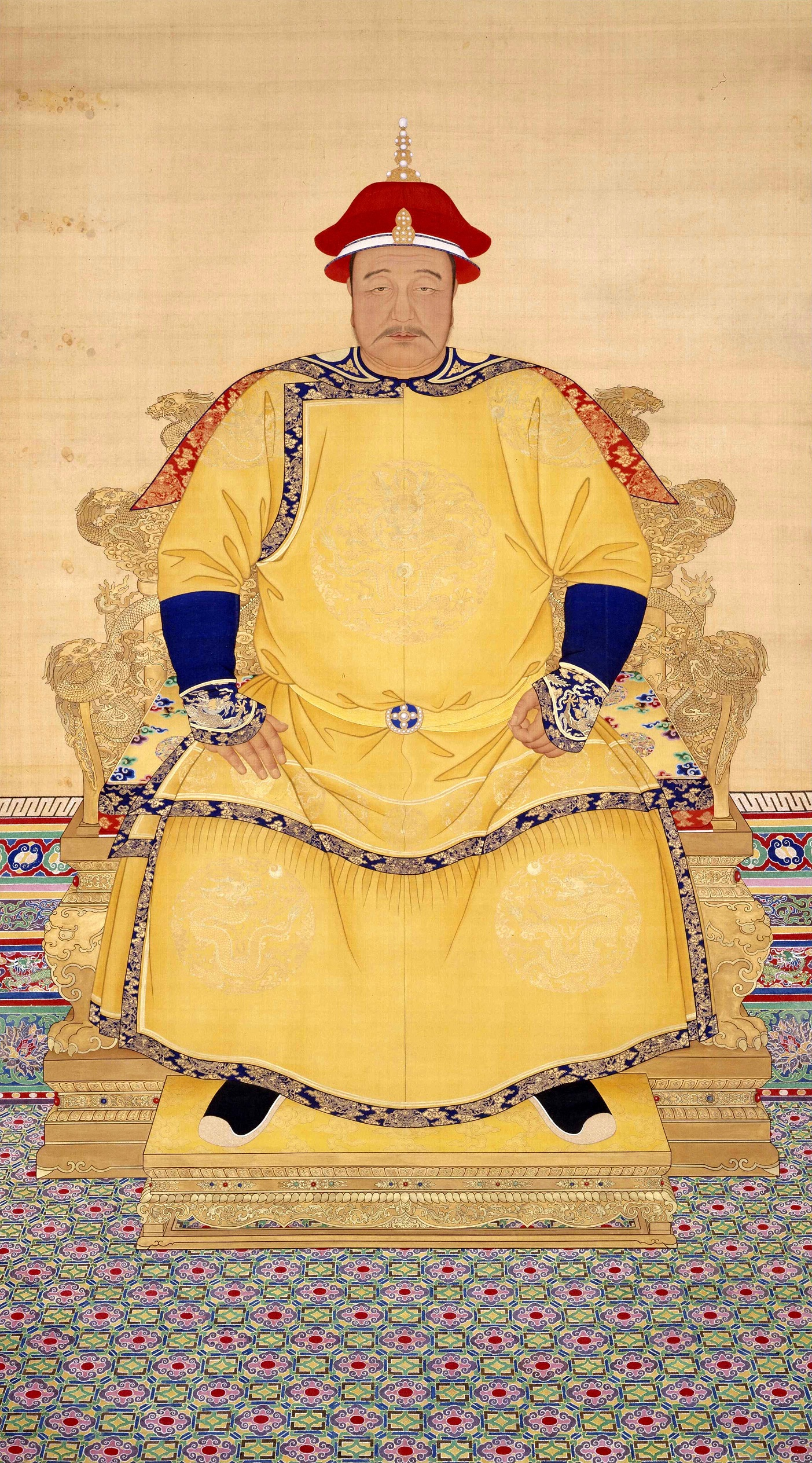
Hong Taiji

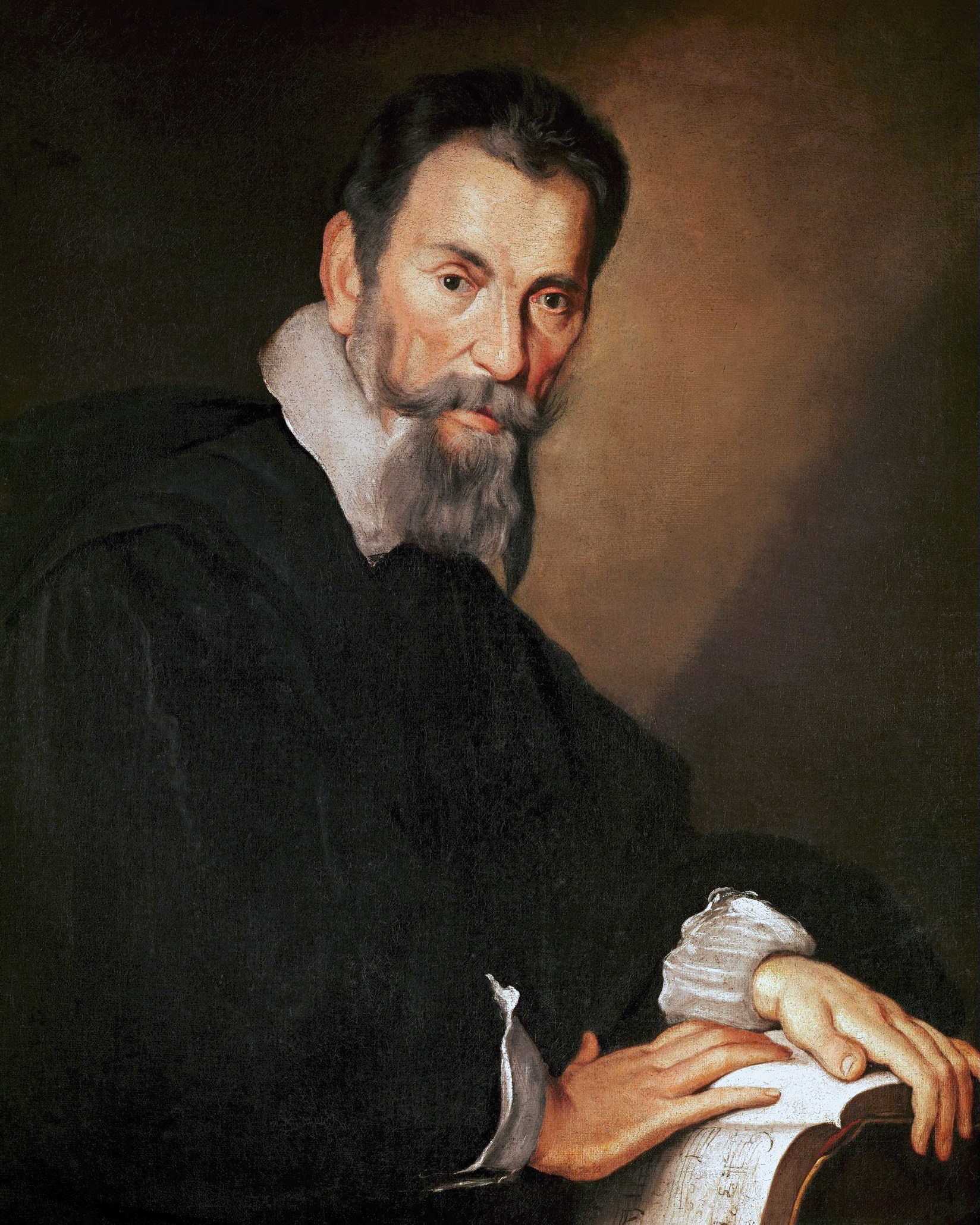
Claudio Monteverdi

- January 14 – John Bois, English scholar (b. 1560)
- January 20 – Henry Danvers, 1st Earl of Danby, English noble (b. 1573)
- February 11 – Countess Palatine Anna Maria of Neuburg, Duchess of Saxe-Altenburg (b. 1575)
- February 15 – Countess Juliane of Nassau-Siegen, Landgravine of Hesse-kassel (b. 1587)
- February 25 – Marco da Gagliano, Italian composer (b. 1582)
- March 1
  - Girolamo Frescobaldi, Italian composer (b. 1583)
  - Rustam Khan, Georgian-Iranian soldier (b. c. 1588)
- April 4 – Simon Episcopius, Dutch theologian (b. 1583)
- April 12
  - Louis I, Count of Erbach-Erbach (1606–1643) (b. 1579)
  - Nicolaus Hunnius, German theologian (b. 1585)
- April 13 – Margherita Farnese, Benedictine nun (b. 1567)
- April 20 – Christoph Demantius, German composer (b. 1567)
- April 28
  - Francisco de Lucena, Portuguese Secretary of State (b. c. 1578)
  - Philip III, Landgrave of Hesse-Butzbach (b. 1581)
- May 14 – King Louis XIII of France (b. 1601)
- July 12 – François Duquesnoy, Flemish Baroque sculptor in Rome (b. 1597)
- July 25 – Robert Pierrepont, 1st Earl of Kingston-upon-Hull, English statesman (b. 1584)
- August – Anne Hutchinson, English Puritan preacher (b. 1591)
- August 7 – Margaret of Brunswick-Lüneburg, German noble (b. 1573)
- August 22
  - Philippe de Carteret II, son of Philippe de Carteret I (1552– (b. 1584)
  - Johann Georg Wirsung, German anatomist (b. 1589)
- September 15 – Richard Boyle, 1st Earl of Cork, Irish politician (b. 1566)
- September 20, at the Battle of Newbury:
  - Lucius Cary, 2nd Viscount Falkland, English politician and writer (b. c. 1610)
  - Robert Dormer, 1st Earl of Carnarvon (b. c. 1610)
  - Henry Spencer, 1st Earl of Sunderland (b. 1620)
- September 21 – Emperor Hong Taiji of China (b. 1592)
- October 2 – Jean Chalette, French painter (b. 1581)
- October 29 – Brilliana, Lady Harley, English noble, letter writer and war heroine (b. 1598)
- November 3
  - John Bainbridge, English astronomer (b. 1583)
  - Paul Guldin, Swiss astronomer and mathematician (b. 1577)
  - Sun Chuanting, Ming dynasty general (b. 1593)
- November 14
  - Henry Hastings, 5th Earl of Huntingdon, English noble (b. 1586)
  - George Aribert of Anhalt-Dessau, German nobleman (b. 1606)
- November 15 – Tachibana Muneshige, Japanese samurai and soldier (b. 1567)
- November 17 – Jean-Baptiste Budes, Comte de Guébriant, Marshal of France (b. 1602)
- November 29
  - William Cartwright, English dramatist (b. 1611)
  - Claudio Monteverdi, Italian composer (b. 1567)
- December 8 – John Pym, English statesman (b. 1583)
- December 10 – Herman Wrangel, Swedish soldier and politician (b. 1584/1587)
- December 11
  - Arthur Bell, English Franciscan martyr (b. 1590)
  - Henry Clifford, 5th Earl of Cumberland, English politician (b. 1591)
- December 30 – Giovanni Baglione, Italian painter and historian of art (b. 1566)
- approx. date – Henry Glapthorne, English dramatist (b. 1610)
- date unknown
  - Sophia Brahe, Danish astronomer and horticulturalist (b. 1556)
  - María Pita, Spanish heroine (b. 1565)

1644

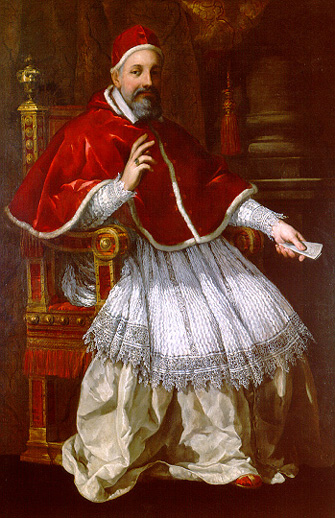
Pope Urban VIII

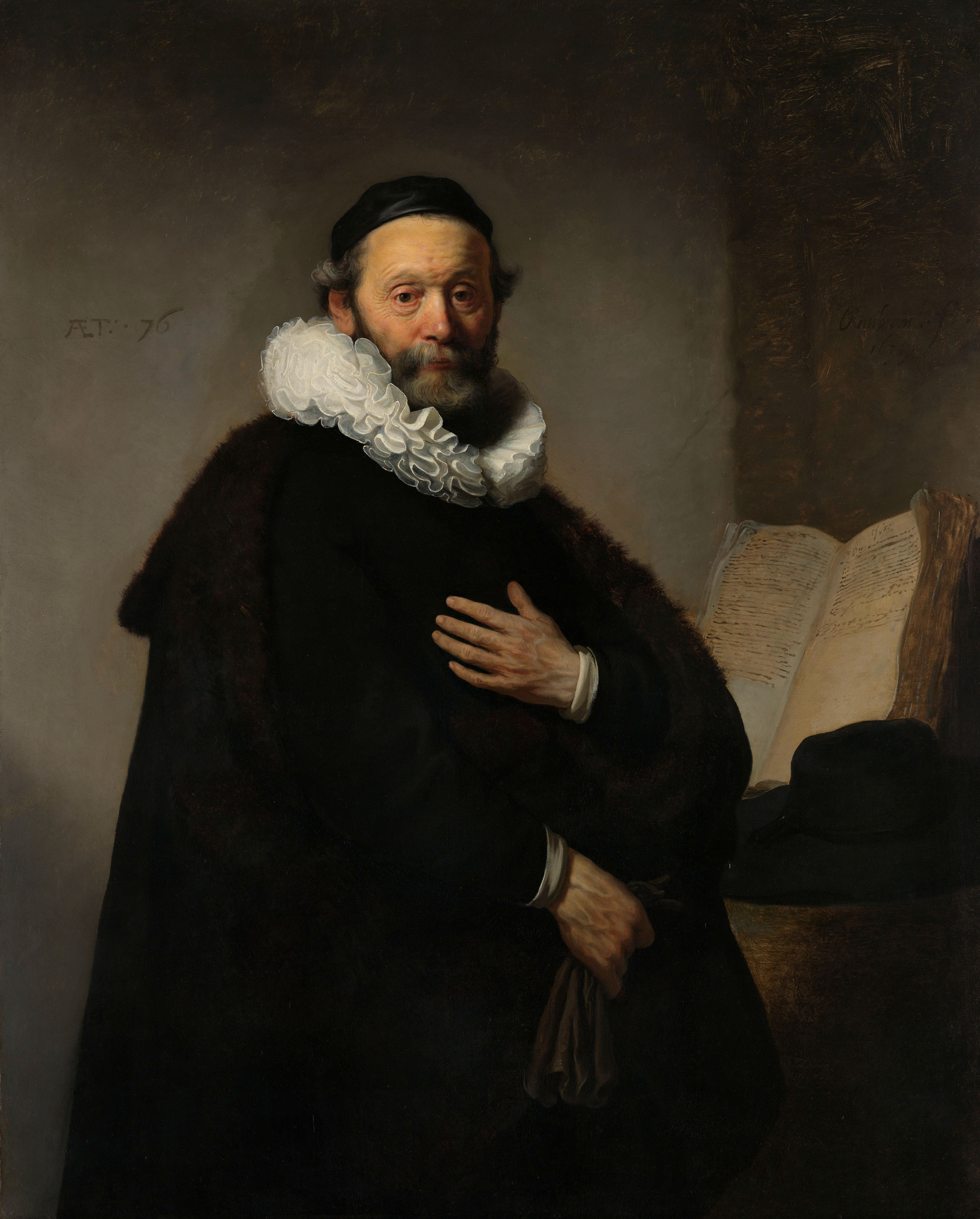
Johannes Wtenbogaert

- January 20 – Stefano Amadei, Italian painter (b. 1580)
- January 30 – William Chillingworth, controversial English churchman (b. 1602)
- January 31 – Georg II of Fleckenstein-Dagstuhl, German nobleman (b. 1588)
- February 28 – Guru Har Gobind, the Sixth Sikh Guru (b. 1595)
- March 15 – Countess Louise Juliana of Nassau, Regent of Bohemia (b. 1576)
- March 24 – Cecilia Renata of Austria, Queen of Poland (b. 1611)
- March 29 – Lord John Stewart, Scottish aristocrat, Royalist commander in the English Civil War (b. 1621)
- April 2 – Diego Salcedo, Spanish bishop (b. 1575)
- April 10 – Reverend William Brewster, English Pilgrim leader (b. 1567)
- April 25 – Chongzhen, last Ming Emperor of China (suicide) (b. 1611)
- April 28 – Zsófia Bosnyák, Hungarian noblewoman (b. 1609)
- May 26 – Alfonso III d'Este, Duke of Modena, Italian noble (b. 1591)
- June 17
  - Anne de Montafié, Countess of Clermont-en-Beauvaisis, French countess (b. 1577)
  - John of St. Thomas, Portuguese philosopher (b. 1589)
- July 4 – Brian Twyne, English archivist (b. 1581)
- July 7 – Hedwig of Hesse-Kassel, countess consort of Schaumburg (b. 1569)
- July 16 – Giovanni Biliverti, Italian painter (b. 1585)
- July 25 – Amar Singh Rathore, Rajput nobleman affiliated with the royal house of Marwar (b. 1613)
- July 29 – Pope Urban VIII (b. 1568)
- August 25 – Johann Heinrich Alting, German Lutheran theologian (b. 1583)
- September 4 – Johannes Wtenbogaert, Dutch leader of the Remonstrants (b. 1557)
- September 7
  - Guido Bentivoglio, Italian statesman and historian (b. 1579)
  - Ralph Corbie, Irish Jesuit (b. 1598)
- September 8
  - John Coke, English politician (b. 1563)
  - Francis Quarles, English poet (b. 1592)
- October 6 – Elisabeth of France, queen of Philip IV of Spain (b. 1602)
- October 19 – Johann Friedrich, Count Palatine of Sulzbach-Hilpoltstein (b. 1587)
- October 30 – Jorge de Cárdenas y Manrique de Lara, Spanish noble (b. 1584)
- November 6 – Thomas Roe, English diplomat (b. c. 1581)
- November 10 – Luis Vélez de Guevara, Spanish writer (b. 1579)
- November 20 – Nathaniel Foote, American colonist (b. 1592)
- November 24 – Deodat del Monte, Flemish painter, architect (b. 1582)
- December 20 – Albert IV, Duke of Saxe-Eisenach (from 1640) (b. 1599)
- December 23 – Sir Alexander Carew, 2nd Baronet, English politician (b. 1609)
- December 28 – John Bankes, Attorney General and Chief Justice to King Charles I of England (b. 1589)
- December 30 – Jan Baptist van Helmont, Flemish chemist (b. 1577)

1645

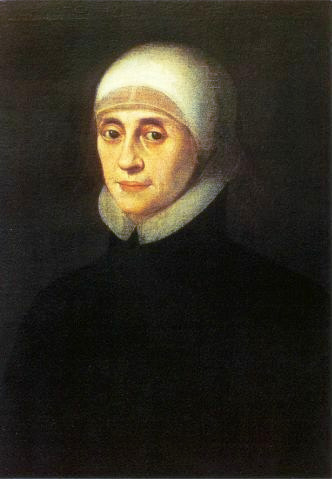
Venerable Mary Ward

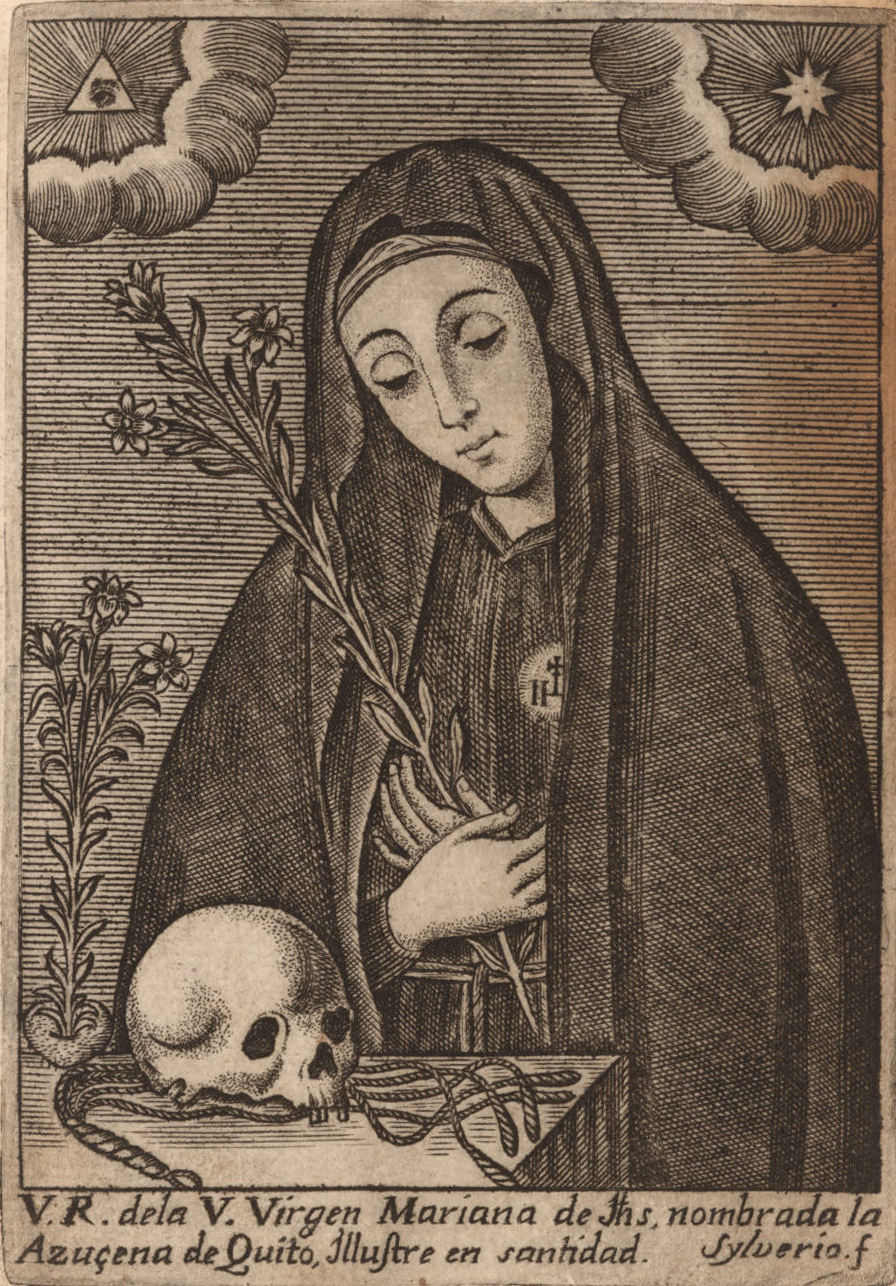
Saint Mariana de Jesús de Paredes

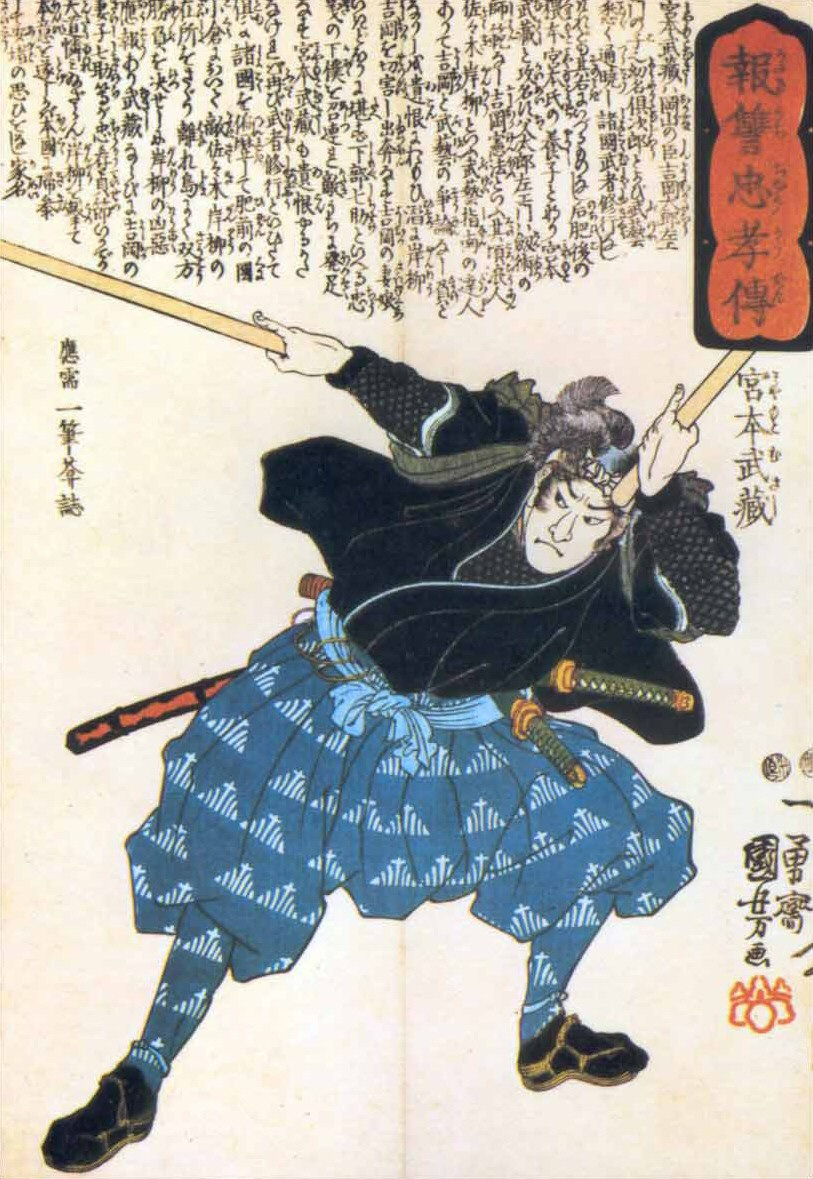
Miyamoto Musashi

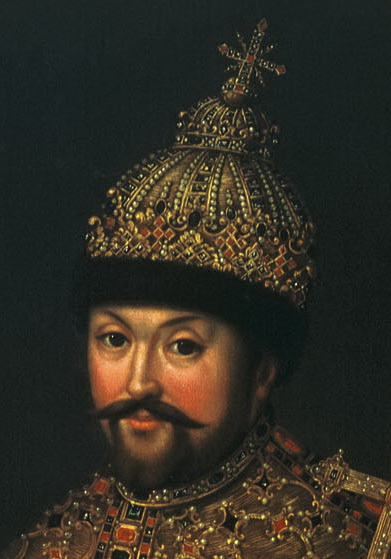
Tsar Michael I of Russia

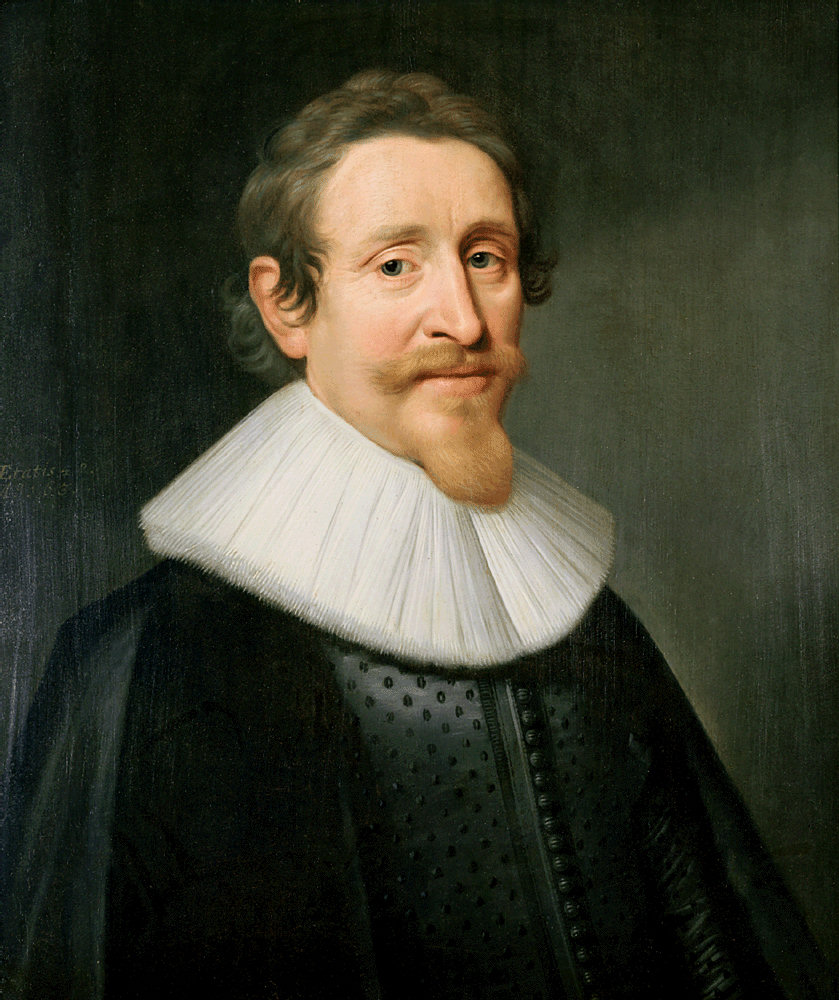
Hugo Grotius

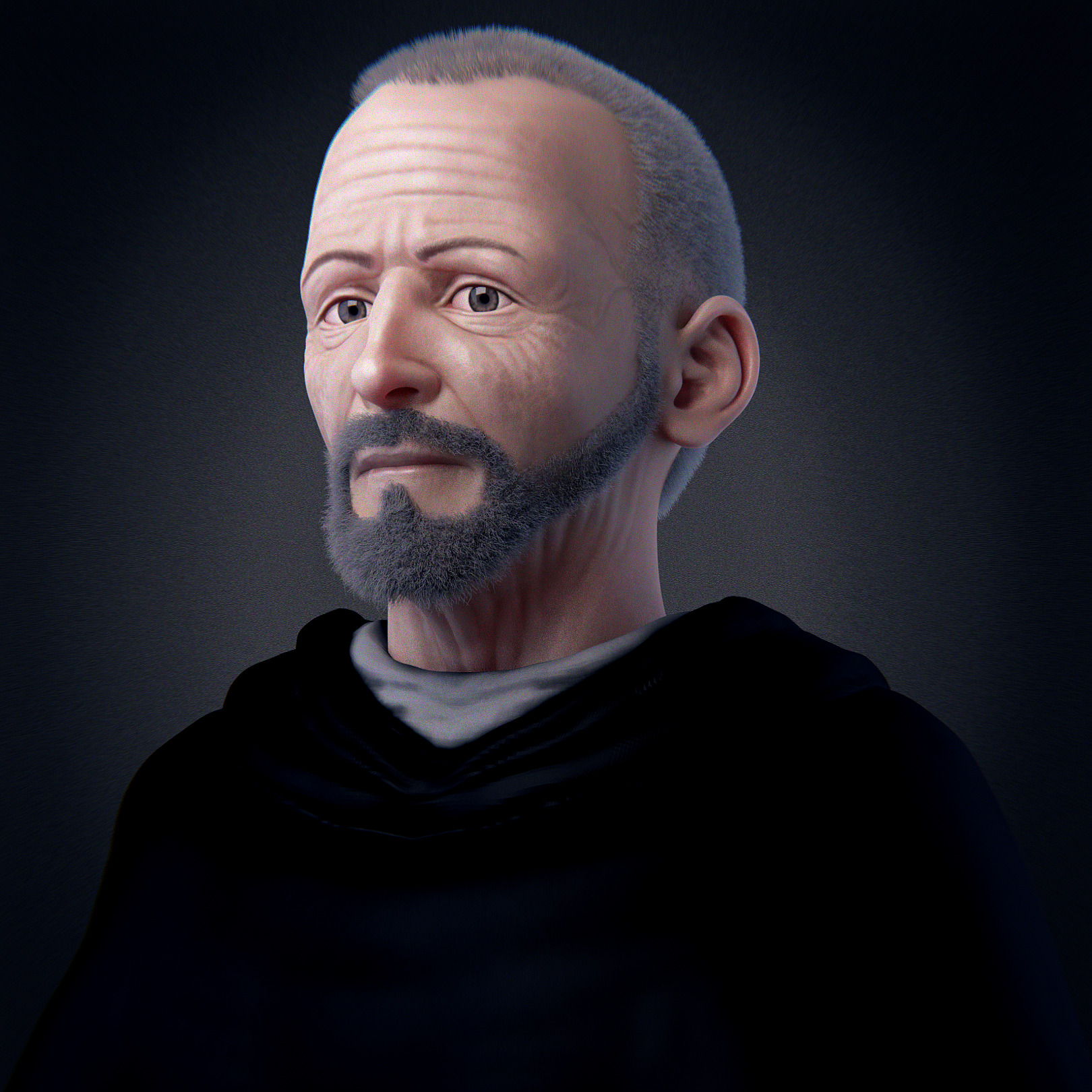
Saint John Macias

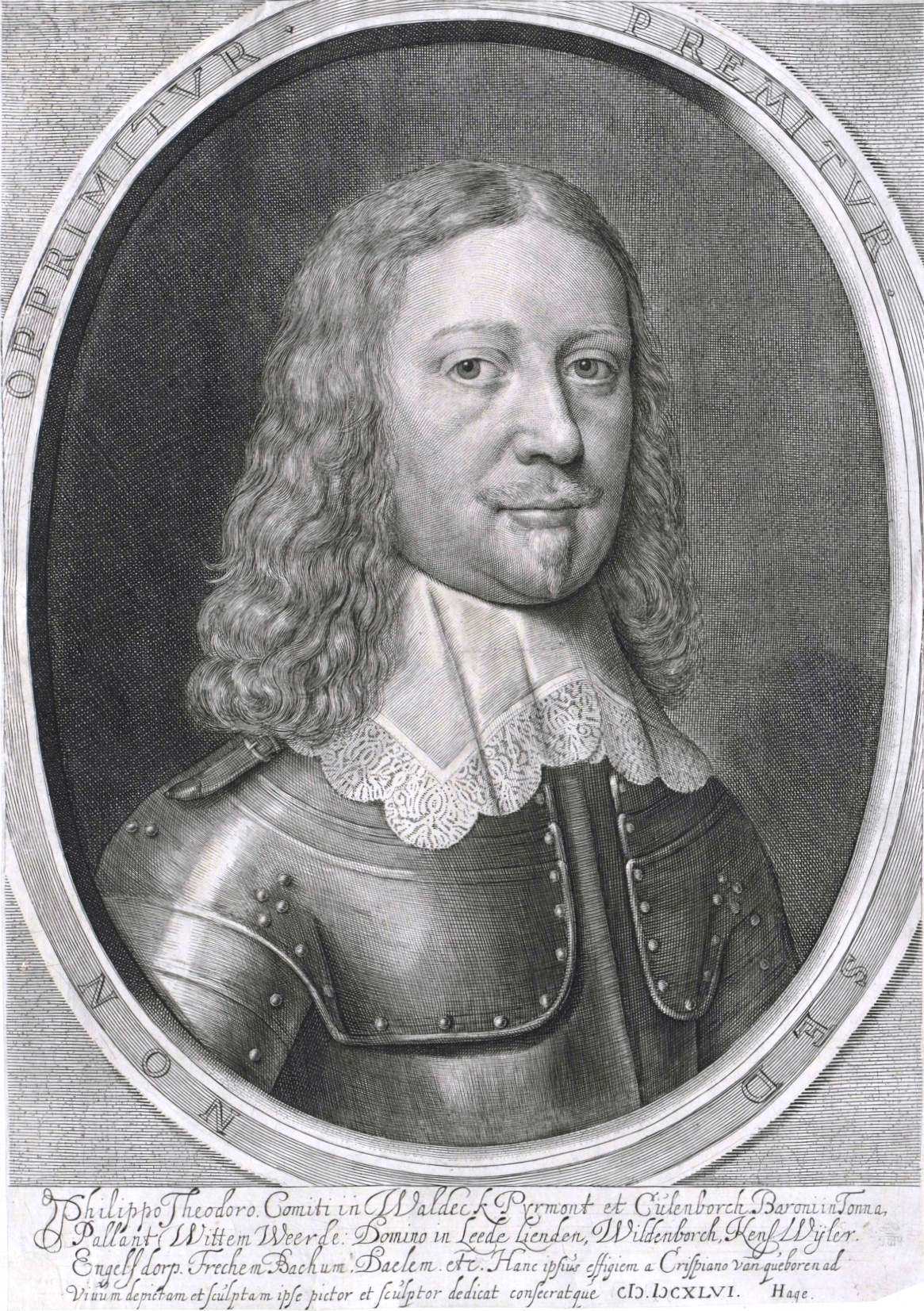
Philip Dietrich, Count of Waldeck

- January 2 – Agnes of Limburg-Styrum, Abbess of Elten, Vreden, Borghorst and Freckenhorst (b. 1563)
- January 10 – William Laud, Archbishop of Canterbury (b. 1573)
- January 11 – Henry Gage, Royalist officer in the English Civil War (b. 1597)
- January 17 – Pál Esterházy, Hungarian noble (b. 1587)
- January 24 – Giovanni Branca, Italian architect and engineer (b. 1571)
- January 30 – Mary Ward, English Roman Catholic Religious Sister and Venerable (b. 1585)
- January 31 – Hans Ulrik Gyldenløve, illegitimate son of King Christian IV of Denmark and his mistress (b. 1615)
- February 9 – Mutio Vitelleschi, Italian Jesuit Superior General (b. 1563)
- February 10 – Dorothea Sophia, Abbess of Quedlinburg Abbey (b. 1587)
- February 14 – François de La Rochefoucauld, French Catholic cardinal (b. 1558)
- February 16 – Gonzalo Fernández de Córdoba, Spanish general (b. 1585)
- February 24 – Philip VII, Count of Waldeck-Wildungen (1638–1645) (b. 1613)
- March 4 – Matthias Hoe von Hoenegg, German theologian (b. 1580)
- March 24 – Sir Thomas Aston, 1st Baronet, English politician (b. 1600)
- April 6 – William Burton, British antiquarian (b. 1575)
- April 16 – Tobias Hume, English composer (b. 1559)
- April 17 – Daniel Featley, English theologian and controversialist (b. 1582)
- April 29 – Maximilian of Liechtenstein, Austrian nobleman and Imperial General (b. 1578)
- May 20 – Shi Kefa, Chinese Ming Dynasty official (b. 1601)
- May 21 – Crown Prince Sohyeon, Korean crown prince (b. 1612)
- May 26 – Mariana de Jesús de Paredes, Ecuadorian Roman Catholic hermit and saint (b. 1618)
- May 29 – Adam Christian Agricola, German Evangelical preacher (b. 1593)
- June 13 – Miyamoto Musashi, Japanese swordsman (b. c. 1584)
- July 7 – Georg Friedrich of Hohenlohe-Neuenstein-Weikersheim, officer and amateur poet (b. 1569)
- July 13 – Marie de Gournay, French writer (b. 1565)
- July 17 – Robert Carr, 1st Earl of Somerset, Scottish politician (b. c. 1590)
- July 22 – Gaspar de Guzmán, Count-Duke of Olivares, Spanish statesman (b. 1587)
- July 23 – Tsar Michael I of Russia (b. 1596)
- August 6 – Lionel Cranfield, 1st Earl of Middlesex, English merchant (b. 1575)
- August 18 – Eudoxia Streshneva, Tsaritsa of Russia (b. 1608)
- August 28 – Hugo Grotius, Dutch philosopher and writer (b. 1583)
- August 31 – Francesco Bracciolini, Italian poet (b. 1566)
- September 8 – Francisco de Quevedo, Spanish writer (b. 1580)
- September 11 – Nikolaus, Count Esterházy, Hungarian noble (b. 1583)
- September 14 – Sir Richard Grosvenor, 1st Baronet, English politician (b. 1585)
- September 16 – John Macias, Spanish Dominican friar and saint (b. 1585)
- October 2 – Francesco Cennini de' Salamandri, Italian Catholic cardinal (b. 1566)
- November 21 – William Helyar, English chaplain (b. 1559)
- December 7 – Philip Dietrich, Count of Waldeck-Eisenberg (1640–1645) (b. 1614)
- December 12 – Giovanni Bernardino Azzolini or Mazzolini or Asoleni, Italian painter (b. c. 1572)
- December 17 – Nur Jahan, empress consort of the Mughal Empire (b. 1577)
- December 28 – Gaspar de Borja y Velasco, Spanish Catholic cardinal (b. 1580)
- date unknown
  - Françoise-Marie Jacquelin, Acadian heroine (b. 1621)
  - William Lithgow, Scottish traveller (b. c. 1585)
  - Sultan Agung, third Sultan of Mataram (b. 1593)

1646

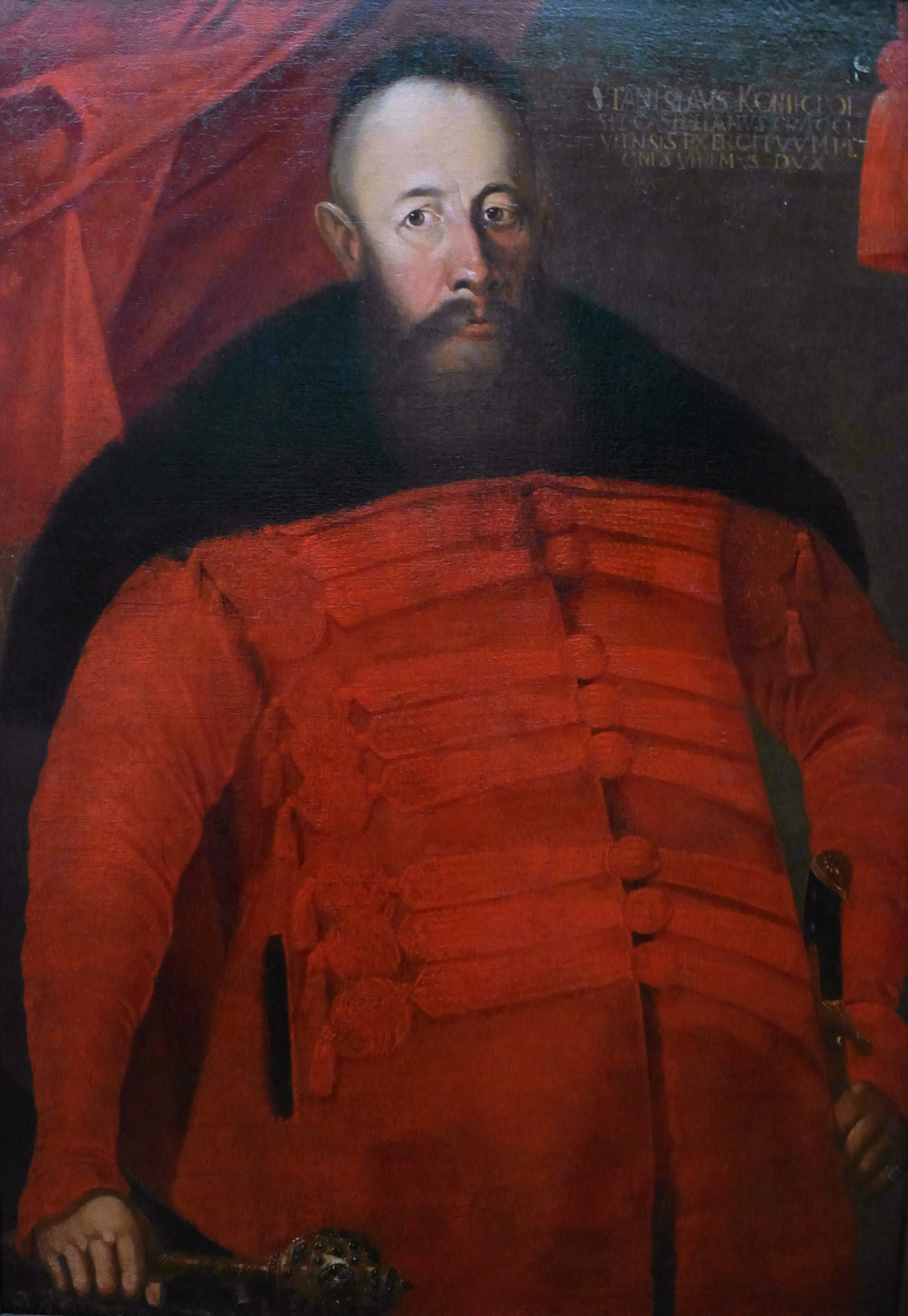
Stanisław Koniecpolski

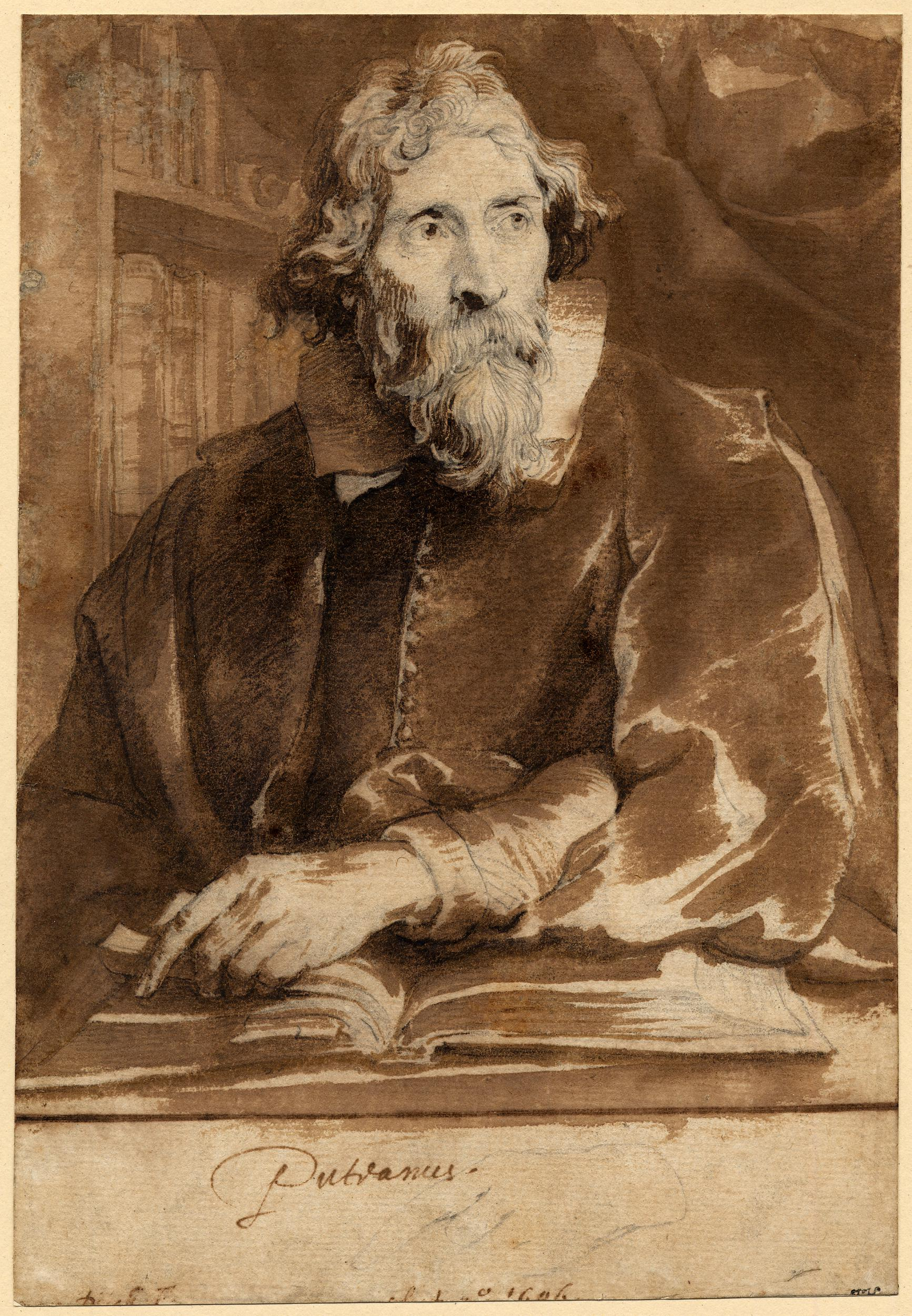
Erycius Puteanus

- January 3 – Francesco Erizzo, Doge of Venice (b. 1566)
- January 4 – Gaspard III de Coligny, Marshal of France (b. 1584)
- January 6 – Elias Holl, German architect (b. 1573)
- January 18 – Hosokawa Tadaoki, Japanese daimyō (b. 1563)
- February 4 – Johannes Polyander, Dutch theologian (b. 1568)
- March 11 – Stanisław Koniecpolski, Polish soldier and statesman (b. c. 1592)
- April 10 – Santino Solari, Swiss architect and sculptor (b. 1576)
- May 13 – Maria Anna of Spain (b. 1606)
- June 14 – Jean Armand de Maillé-Brézé, French admiral (b. 1619)
- June 23 – Jakub Sobieski, Polish noble (b. 1590)
- June 27 – Achille d'Étampes de Valençay, Knight of Malta (b. 1593)
- June 29
  - Laughlin Ó Cellaigh, Gaelic-Irish Lord
  - Jan Reynst, Dutch art collector (b. 1601)
- June 30 – Philip Powell, Welsh martyr (b. 1594)
- July 13 – Roger de Saint-Lary de Termes, French noble (b. 1562)
- July 25 – Maria Caterina Farnese, Duchess of Modena and Reggio (b. 1615)
- August 9 – Margherita Aldobrandini, Parmesan regent (b. 1588)
- August 19 – Alexander Henderson, Scottish theologian (b. c. 1583)
- September 1 – Francis Windebank, English statesman (b. 1582)
- September 9 – Mu Zeng, Chinese politician (b. 1587)
- September 11
  - Antonio Marcello Barberini, Italian cardinal and the younger brother of Maffeo Barberini (b. 1569)
  - Odoardo Farnese, Duke of Parma and Piacenza (b. 1612)
- September 14 – Robert Devereux, 3rd Earl of Essex, English Civil War general (b. 1591)
- September 17 – Erycius Puteanus, Dutch humanist and philologist (b. 1574)
- September 24 – Duarte Lobo, Portuguese composer (b. c. 1565)
- October 3 – Virgilio Mazzocchi, Italian Baroque composer (b. 1597)
- October 4 – Thomas Howard, 21st Earl of Arundel, English statesman (b. 1586)
- October 9 – Balthasar Charles, Prince of Asturias (b. 1629)
- October 12 – François de Bassompierre, Marshal of France (b. 1579)
- October 18 – Isaac Jogues, French Jesuit missionary (b. 1607)
- October 28 – William Dobson, English painter (b. 1610)
- November 4 – Louis Günther I, Count of Schwarzburg-Rudolstadt (b. 1581)
- November 29 – Laurentius Paulinus Gothus, Swedish theologian and astronomer (b. 1565)
- December 22 – Peter Mohyla, Moldavian Orthodox Metropolitan of Kiev and Galicia (b. 1596)
- December 26 – Henri, Prince of Condé (b. 1588)
- December 28 – François Maynard, French poet (b. 1582)
- date unknown – Lady Ann Cunningham, Scottish noble and army leader (b. c. 1580)

1647

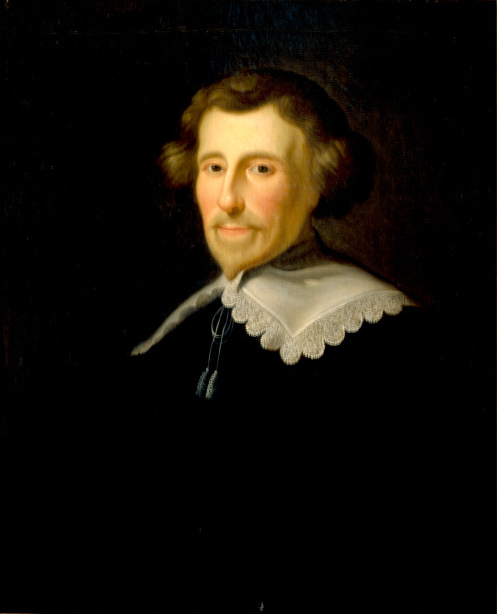
P.C. Hooft

Nicholas Stone

- January 2 – Zhang Xianzhong, Chinese rebel (b. 1606)
- January 6 – Francisco Ximénez de Urrea, Spanish historian (b. 1589)
- January 14 – François L’Anglois, French artist (b. 1589)
- January 29 – Francis Meres, English writer (b. 1565)
- February 6 – Juan Alfonso Enríquez de Cabrera, Viceroy of Sicily and Viceroy of Naples (b. 1599)
- February 17 – Johann Heermann, German poet, hymn-writer (b. 1585)
- March 2 – Johanna Elisabeth of Nassau-Hadamar, by marriage Princess of Anhalt-Harzgerode (b. 1619)
- March 14 – Frederick Henry, Prince of Orange (b. 1584)
- March 29 – Charles Butler, English beekeeper and philologist (b. 1560)
- April 20 – Sir John Hobart, 2nd Baronet, English politician (b. 1593)
- May 21 – Pieter Corneliszoon Hooft, Dutch poet and historian (b. 1581)
- June 2 – Christian, Prince-Elect of Denmark (b. 1603)
- June 9 – Leonard Calvert, Colonial governor of Maryland (b. 1606)
- June 12 – Thomas Farnaby, English grammarian (b. c. 1575)
- July 1 – Francis Walsingham, English Jesuit (b. 1577)
- July 7 – Thomas Hooker, Connecticut colonist (b. 1586)
- July 12 – Francesco Maria Farnese, Italian Catholic cardinal (b. 1619)
- July 16 – Masaniello, Italian rebel (b. 1622)
- August 24 – Nicholas Stone, English sculptor and architect (b. 1586)
- August 27 – Pietro Novelli, Italian painter (b. 1603)
- September 9 – Sir Edward Osborne, 1st Baronet, English politician (b. 1596)
- September 18 – Pietro Carrera, Italian chess player (b. 1573)
- October 8 – Christian Sørensen Longomontanus, Danish astronomer (b. 1562)
- October 9 – Anselm Casimir Wambold von Umstadt, Archbishop of Mainz (b. 1582)
- October 15 – Bartholda van Swieten, Dutch diplomat (b. 1566)
- October 25 – Evangelista Torricelli, Italian mathematician and physicist (b. 1608)
- November 5 – Vincentio Reinieri, Italian mathematician and astronomer (b. 1606)
- November 25 – George Albert I, Count of Erbach-Schönberg (b. 1597)
- November 30
  - Bonaventura Cavalieri, Italian mathematician (b. 1598)
  - Giovanni Lanfranco, Italian painter (b. 1582)
- December 1 – Joseph Gaultier de la Vallette, French astronomer (b. 1564)

1648

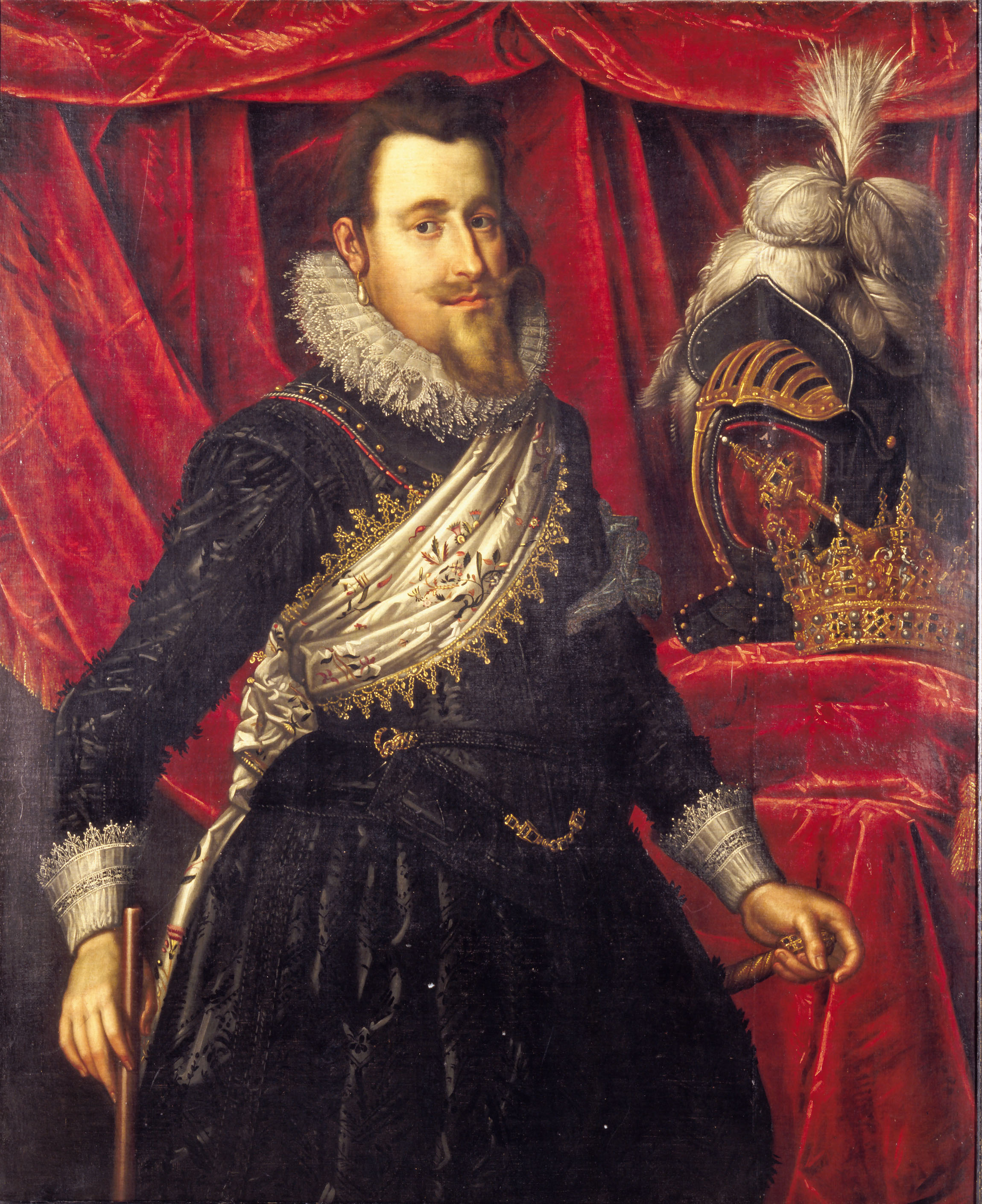
Christian IV of Denmark

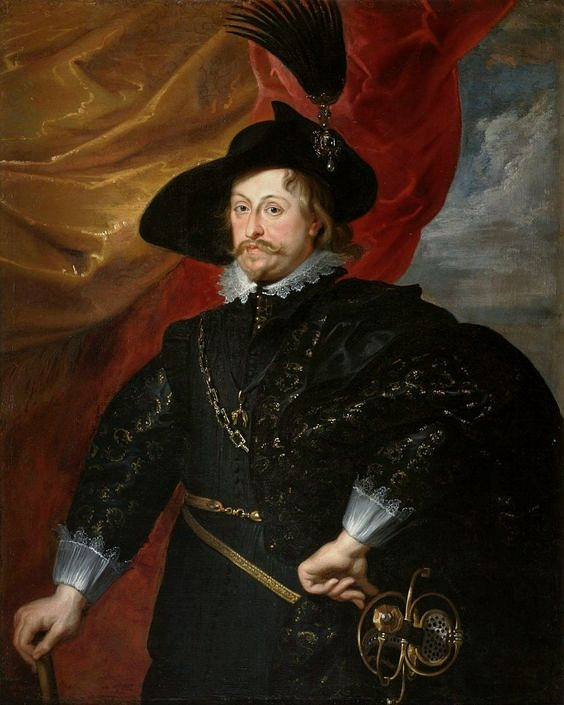
Władysław IV Vasa

- January 14 – Caspar Barlaeus, Dutch polymath (b. 1584)
- January 15 – St. Francisco Fernandez de Capillas, Spanish saint (b. 1607)
- January 20 – Countess Palatine Magdalene Catherine of Zweibrücken and Duchess of Birkenfeld (b. 1607)
- January 23 – Francisco de Rojas Zorrilla, Spanish dramatist (b. 1607)
- January 29 – Francesco Palliola, Italian Servant of God (b. 1612)
- February 22 – Wilhelm Lamormaini, Luxembourgian theologian (b. 1570)
- February 28 – Christian IV, King of Denmark and Norway (b. 1577)
- March 4 – Nicholas Stoughton, English politician (b. 1592)
- March 7 – Catherine of Lorraine, Abbess of Remiremont (b. 1573)
- March 12 – Tirso de Molina, Spanish writer (b. 1571)
- March 14 – Ferdinando Fairfax, 2nd Lord Fairfax of Cameron, English general (b. 1584)
- March 22 – Sir Edward Hussey, 1st Baronet, English politician (b. 1585)
- April 7 – Robert Roberthin, German poet (b. 1600)
- April 12 – Countess Catharina Belgica of Nassau, regent of Hanau-Münzenberg (b. 1578)
- April 29 – John Forbes, Scottish theologian (b. 1593)
- May 17 – Peter Melander Graf von Holzappel, Protestant military leader (b. 1589)
- May 20 – King Władysław IV Vasa of Poland (b. 1595)
- May 26 – Vincent Voiture, French poet (b. 1597)
- June 4 – George Seton, Lord Seton, Scottish noble (b. 1613)
- July 4 – Antoine Daniel, Jesuit missionary at Sainte-Marie among the Hurons (b. 1601)
- July 31 – Noël Juchereau, Quebec pioneer (b. 1593)
- August 2 – Claude Françoise de Lorraine, Princess of Lorraine (b. 1612)
- August 5 – Ivan III Drašković, Croatian nobleman and soldier (b. 1603)
- August 12 – Peter Sainthill, English politician (b. 1593)
- August 18 – Ibrahim, Ottoman Sultan (b. 1615)
- August 20 – Edward Herbert, 1st Baron Herbert of Cherbury, English diplomat, poet, and philosopher (b. 1583)
- August 24 – Juan Damián López de Haro, Spanish Catholic bishop of Puerto Rico (b. 1581)
- August 25 – Joseph Calasanz, Spanish priest and founder of Piarists (b. 1557)
- August 31 – Michele Mazzarino, Italian Catholic cardinal (b. 1605)
- September 1 – Marin Mersenne, French mathematician (b. 1588)
- October 11 – George I Rákóczi, Hungarian prince of Transylvania (b. 1593)
- October 15 – Simone Cantarini, Italian painter and engraver (b. 1612)
- November 1 – Ulrich II, Count of East Frisia, ruler of East Frisia (b. 1605)
- November 17 – Thomas Ford, English composer (b. c. 1580)
- November 25 – Daišan, Manchu politician (b. 1583)
- November 27 – Squire Bence, English politician (b. 1597)
- December 10 – Frederick IV, Duke of Brunswick-Lüneburg (b. 1574)
- December 17 – George Gillespie, Scottish theologian (b. 1613)
- December 25 – Claudia de' Medici (b. 1604)
- date unknown – Emerentia Krakow, Swedish war heroine
  - Cvijeta Zuzorić, Croatian poet (b. 1552)

1649

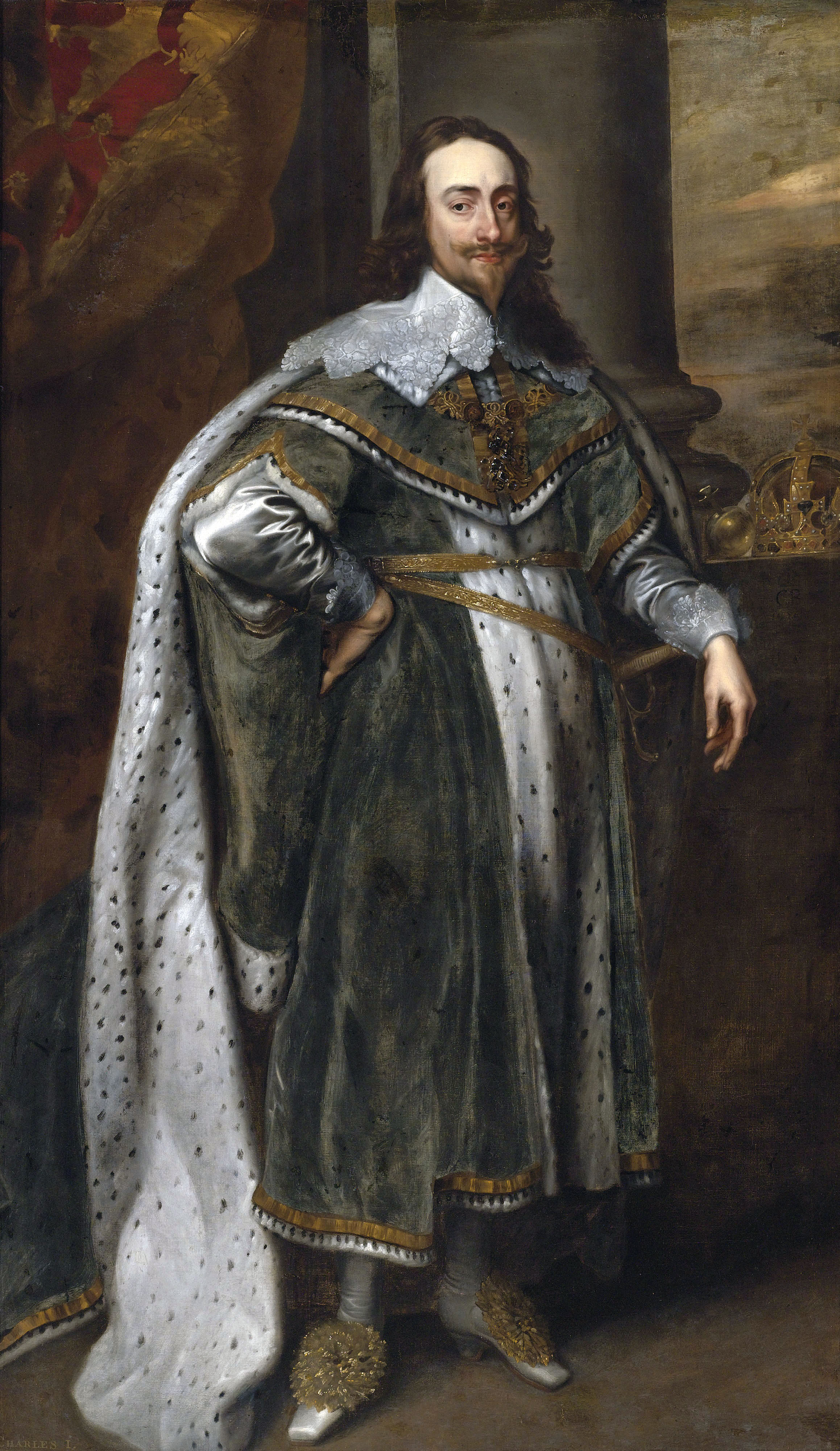
Charles I of England died 30 January

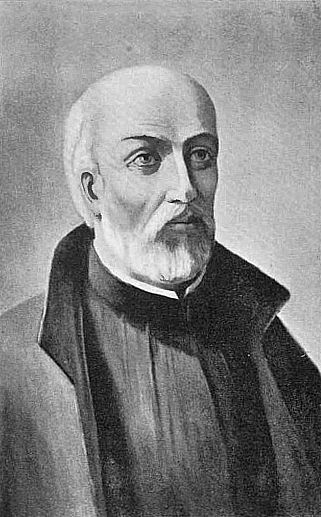
Jean de Brébeuf died 16 March

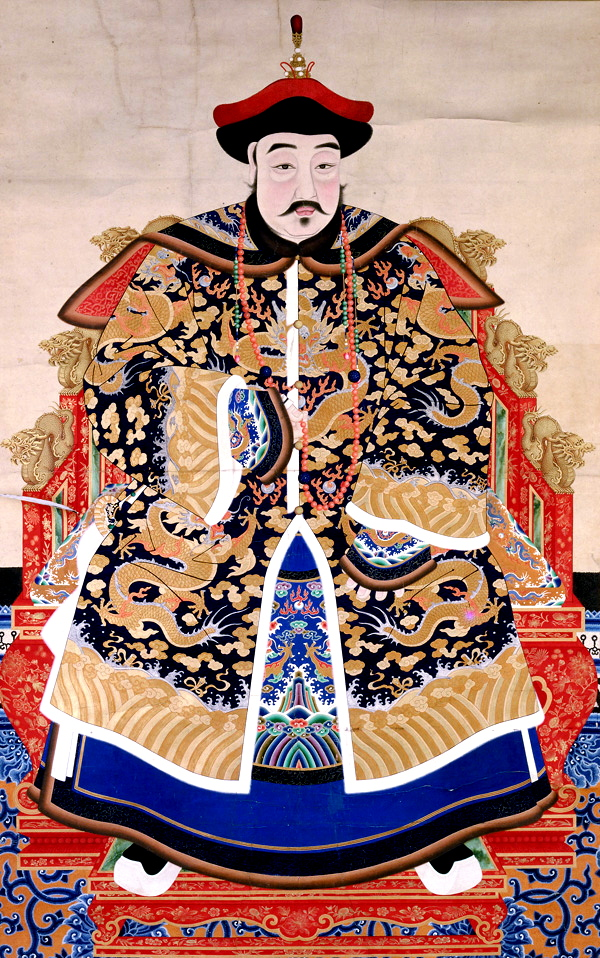
Dodo, Prince Yu died 29 April

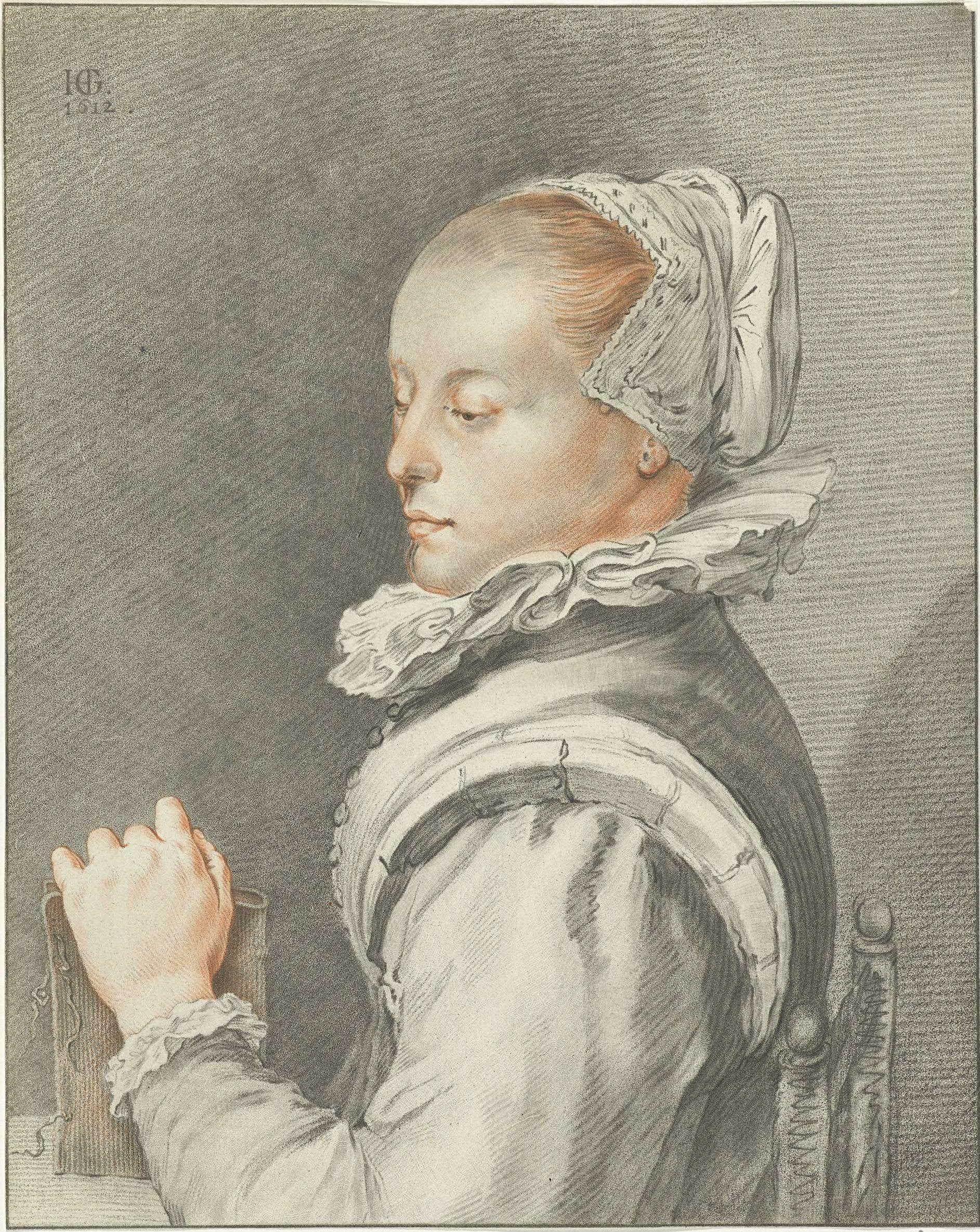
Maria Tesselschade Visscher died 20 June

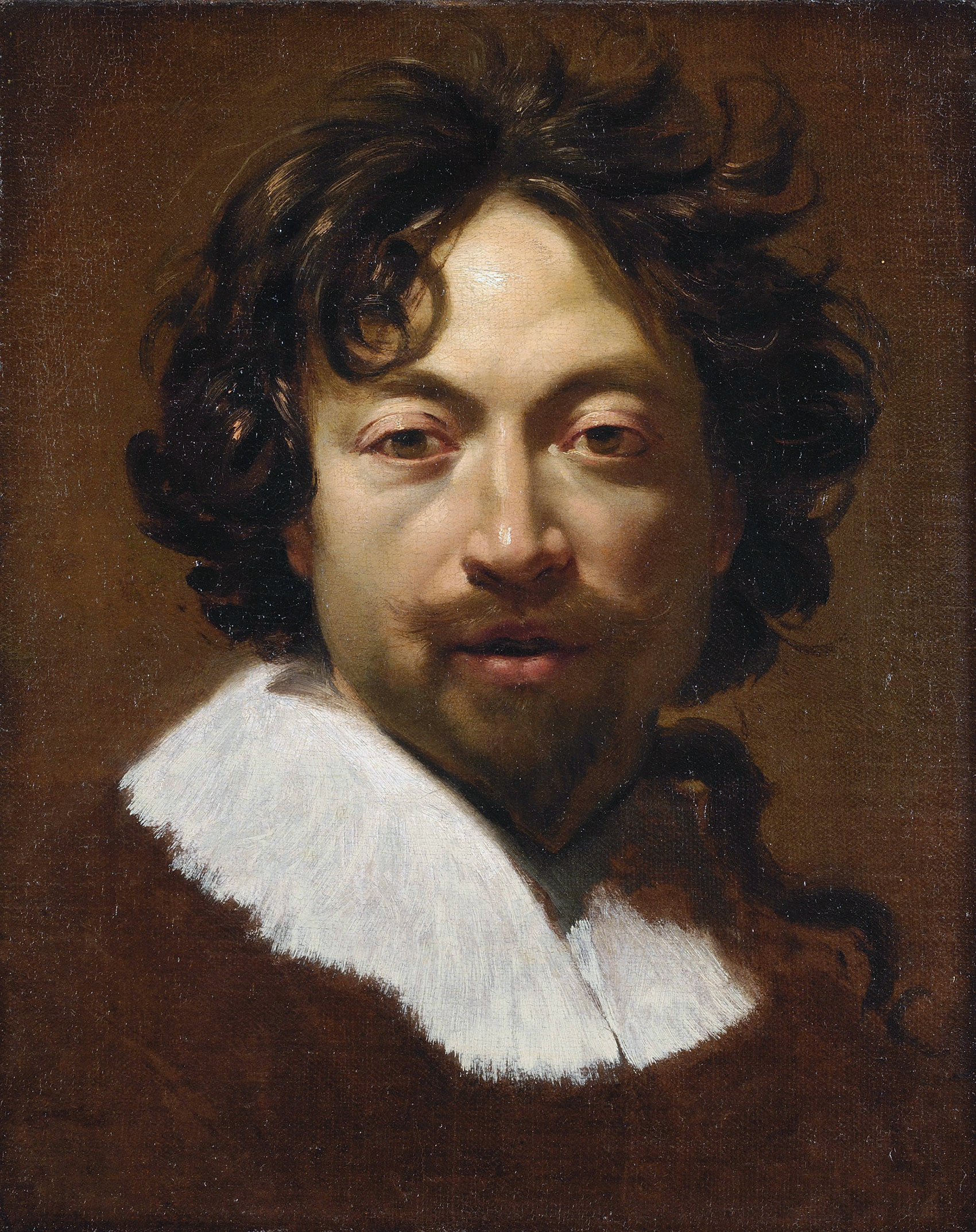
Simon Vouet died 30 June

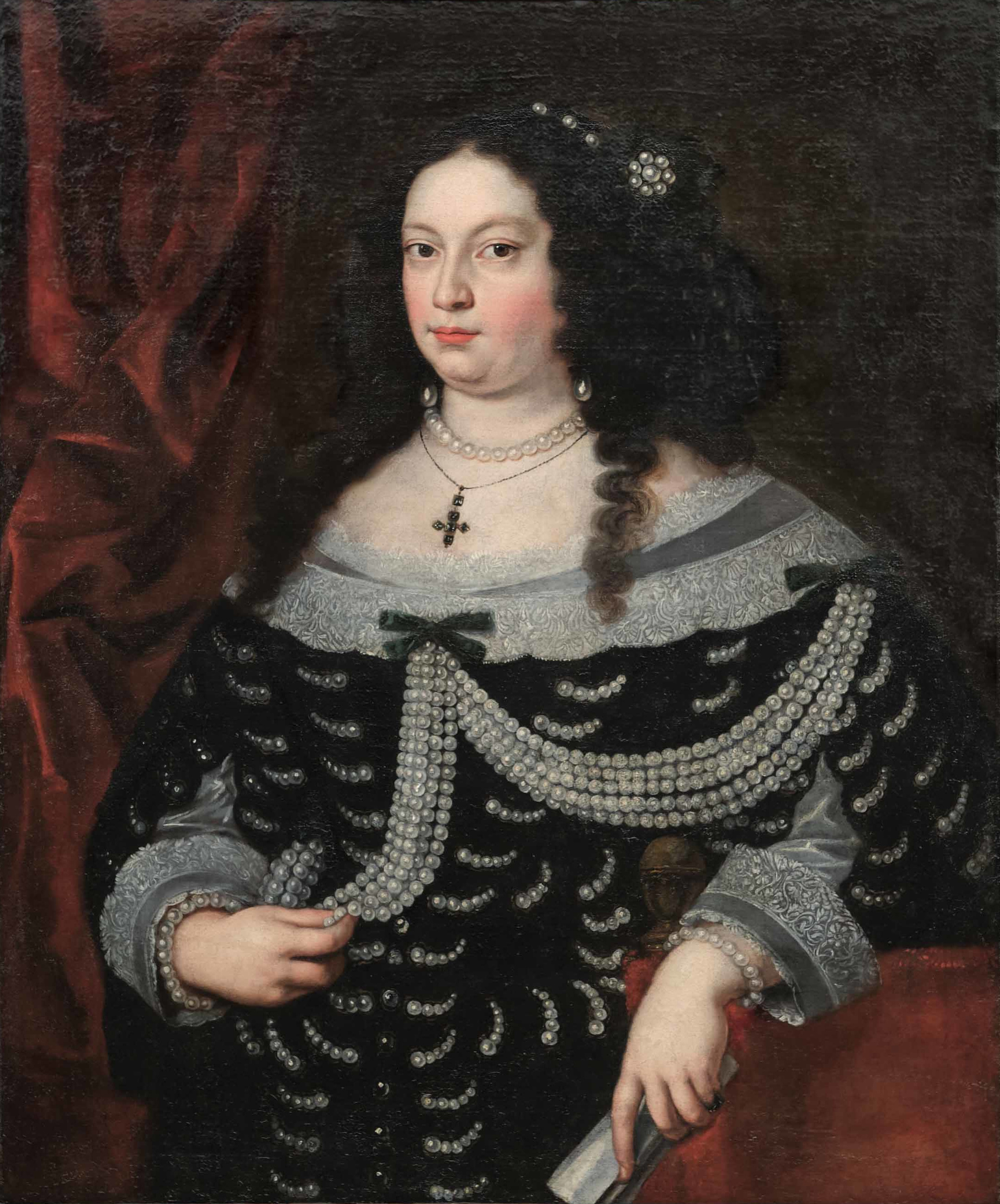
Vittoria Farnese d'Este died 10 August

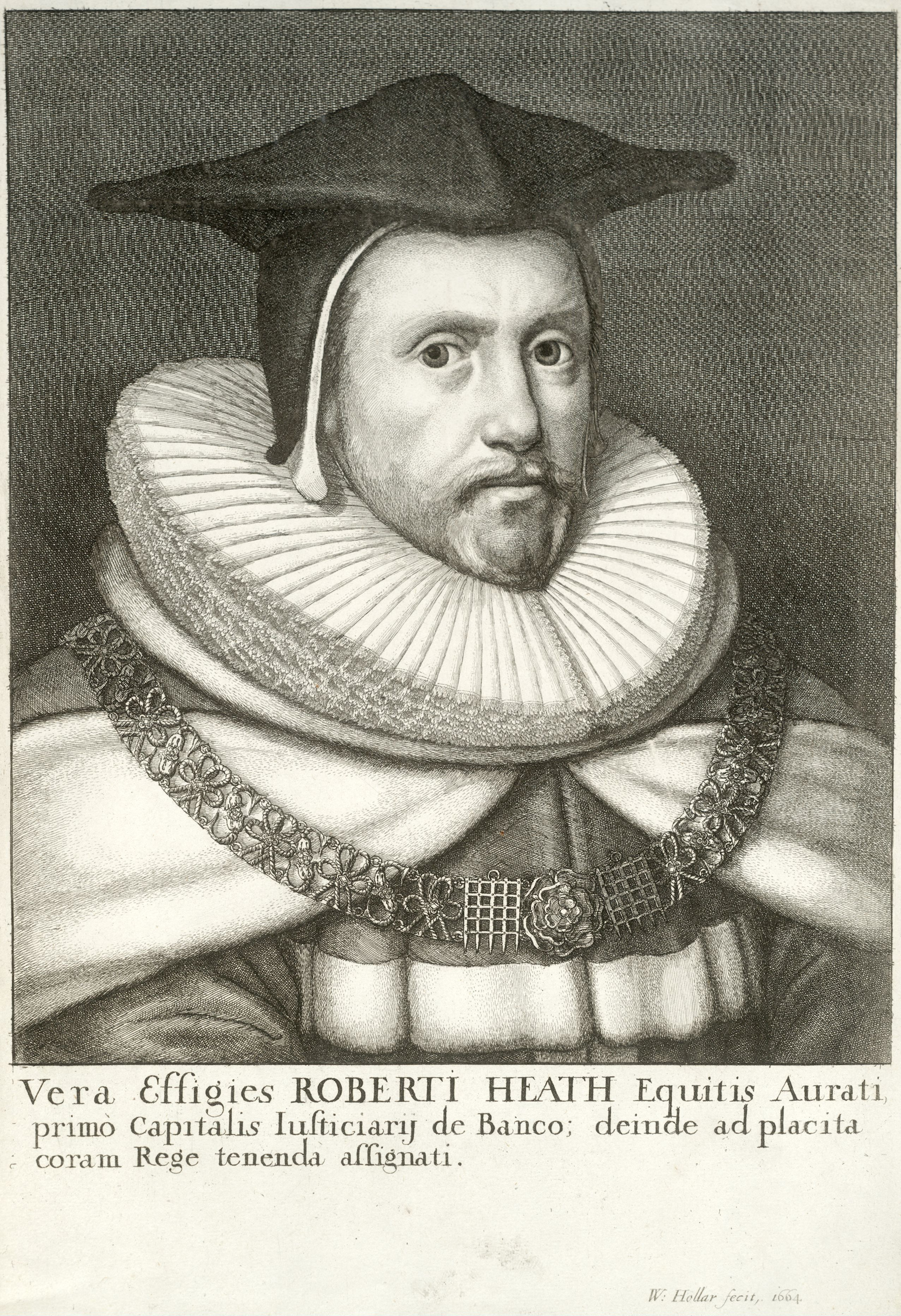
Robert Heath died 30 August

- January 6 – Nicolaus Vernulaeus, professor at the University of Leuven and an important Neo-Latin playwright (b. 1583)
- January 21 – García de Toledo Osorio, 6th Marquis of Villafranca, Spanish noble and politician (b. 1579)
- January 22
  - Pace Giordano, Roman Catholic prelate, Bishop of Trogir (b. 1586)
  - Alessandro Turchi, Italian painter of the early Baroque (b. 1578)
- January 30 – King Charles I of England, Scotland, and Ireland (executed) (b. 1600)
- February 7 – Giovanni Tommaso Malloni, Roman Catholic prelate, Bishop of Belluno and of Šibenik (b. 1579)
- February 18 – Cristóbal Pérez Lazarraga y Maneli Viana, Roman Catholic prelate, Bishop of Cartagena in Colombia and of Chiapas (b. 1599)
- February 23 – Elisabeth Magdalena of Pomerania, German duchess (b. 1580)
- March 2 – Archduchess Maria of Austria (b. 1584)
- March 9
  - Arthur Capell, 1st Baron Capell of Hadham (b. 1608)
  - James Hamilton, 1st Duke of Hamilton, Scottish statesman (b. 1606)
  - Henry Rich, 1st Earl of Holland, English soldier (executed) (b. 1590)
- March 16 – Jean de Brébeuf, French Jesuit missionary (b. 1593)
- March 17 – Gabriel Lalemant, Jesuit missionary in New France, beginning in 1646 (b. 1610)
- March 19 – Gerhard Johann Vossius, German classical scholar and theologian (b. 1577)
- March 20 – Juan Gutiérrez, Roman Catholic prelate, Bishop of Vigevano (b. 1578)
- March 22 – Agostinho Barbosa, Portuguese bishop in Italy and writer on canon law (b. 1589)
- March 26 – John Winthrop, first Governor of Massachusetts Bay Colony (b. c. 1587)
- April 5 – George Hakewill, English clergyman and author (b. 1578)
- April 11 – Ambrose Corbie, English Jesuit teacher (b. 1604)
- April 22 – Marcos de Torres y Rueda, interim viceroy of New Spain (b. 1591)
- April 24
  - Francesco Ingoli, Italian priest (b. 1578)
  - Gaston Jean Baptiste de Renty, French aristocrat and philanthropist (b. 1611)
- April 29 – Dodo, Prince Yu (b. 1614)
- May 8 – Gian Giacomo Cristoforo, Roman Catholic prelate, Bishop of Lacedonia (b. 1588)
- May 14
  - Friedrich Spanheim, Dutch theologian (b. 1600)
  - William Chappell, Irish bishop (b. 1582)
- May 28 – Empress Xiaoduanwen of the Qing Dynasty (b. 1600)
- June 3 – Manuel de Faria e Sousa, Portuguese historian and poet (b. 1590)
- June 6 – Vincenzo Carafa, Italian Jesuit priest and spiritual writer (b. 1585)
- June 17 – Injo of Joseon, sixteenth king of the Joseon dynasty in Korea (b. 1595)
- June 18 – Juan Martínez Montañés, Spanish sculptor (b. 1568)
- June 20 – Maria Tesselschade Visscher, Dutch poet and engraver (b. 1594)
- June 30 – Simon Vouet, French painter (b. 1590)
- June 27 – Chikurin-in, Japanese woman of the late Azuchi-Momoyama through early Edo period (b. 1579)
- July 11 – Susanna Hall, oldest child of William Shakespeare and Anne Hathaway (b. 1582)
- July 20 – Padovanino, Italian painter (b. 1588)
- July 22 – Alessandro Castracani, Roman Catholic prelate, Bishop of Fano (b. 1580)
- July 23 – Anne Arundell (b. c. 1615)
- July 25 – Orazio Giustiniani, Italian Catholic cardinal (b. 1580)
- August 7 – Maria Leopoldine of Austria, Holy Roman Empress (b. 1632)
- August 10 – Vittoria Farnese d'Este, Duchess of Modena and Reggio (b. 1618)
- August 15 – Dorothea of Brunswick-Lüneburg, Spouse of Charles I, Count Palatine of Zweibrücken-Birkenfeld (b. 1570)
- August 21 – Richard Crashaw, English poet (b. c. 1613)
- August 25 – Thomas Shepard, American Puritan minister (b. 1605)
- August 27 – Catherine of Brandenburg, Princess of Transylvania (1629–1630) (b. 1604)
- August 28 – John Guthrie, Scottish prelate (b. 1580)
- August 30 – Robert Heath, English judge and politician (b. 1575)
- September 6 – Robert Dudley, styled Earl of Warwick, English explorer and geographer (b. 1574)
- September 15 – John Floyd, English Jesuit preacher (b. 1572)
- October 3 – Giovanni Diodati, Swiss Protestant clergyman (b. 1576)
- October 16 – Isaac van Ostade, Dutch painter (b. 1621)
- October 28
  - Lady Blanche Arundell, English defender of Wardour Castle (b. 1583)
  - Ludovico Ridolfi, Roman Catholic prelate who served as Bishop of Patti (1649) (b. 1587)
- October 30 – Honoré d'Albert (b. 1581)
- November 6 – Owen Roe O'Neill (b. c. 1585)
- November 11 – Ellen Marsvin, Danish noble, landowner and county administrator (b. 1572)
- November 19 – Caspar Schoppe, German scholar (b. 1576)
- November 21 – Jaroslav Borzita of Martinice, Bohemian noble (b. 1582)
- December 2 – Theodorus Schrevelius, Dutch writer and poet (b. 1572)
- December 4 – William Drummond of Hawthornden, Scottish poet (b. 1585)
- December 7 – Charles Garnier, French Jesuit missionary (b. 1606)
- December 8
  - Noël Chabanel, French Jesuit missionary (b. 1613)
  - Martin Rinkart, German clergyman and hymnist (b. 1586)
