= 1709 =

1709 in various calendars
- Gregorian calendar: 1709; MDCCIX
- Ab urbe condita: 2462
- Armenian calendar: 1158; ԹՎ ՌՃԾԸ
- Assyrian calendar: 6459
- Balinese saka calendar: 1630–1631
- Bengali calendar: 1115–1116
- Berber calendar: 2659
- British Regnal year: 7 Ann. 1 – 8 Ann. 1
- Buddhist calendar: 2253
- Burmese calendar: 1071
- Byzantine calendar: 7217–7218
- Chinese calendar: 戊子年 (Earth Rat); 4406 or 4199 — to — 己丑年 (Earth Ox); 4407 or 4200
- Coptic calendar: 1425–1426
- Discordian calendar: 2875
- Ethiopian calendar: 1701–1702
- Hebrew calendar: 5469–5470
- Hindu calendars
- Vikram Samvat: 1765–1766
- Shaka Samvat: 1630–1631
- Kali Yuga: 4809–4810
- Holocene calendar: 11709
- Igbo calendar: 709–710
- Iranian calendar: 1087–1088
- Islamic calendar: 1120–1121
- Japanese calendar: Hōei 6 (宝永６年)
- Javanese calendar: 1632–1633
- Julian calendar: Gregorian minus 11 days
- Korean calendar: 4042
- Minguo calendar: 203 before ROC 民前203年
- Nanakshahi calendar: 241
- Thai solar calendar: 2251–2252
- Tibetan calendar: ས་ཕོ་བྱི་བ་ལོ་ (male Earth-Rat); 1835 or 1454 or 682 — to — ས་མོ་གླང་ལོ་ (female Earth-Ox); 1836 or 1455 or 683

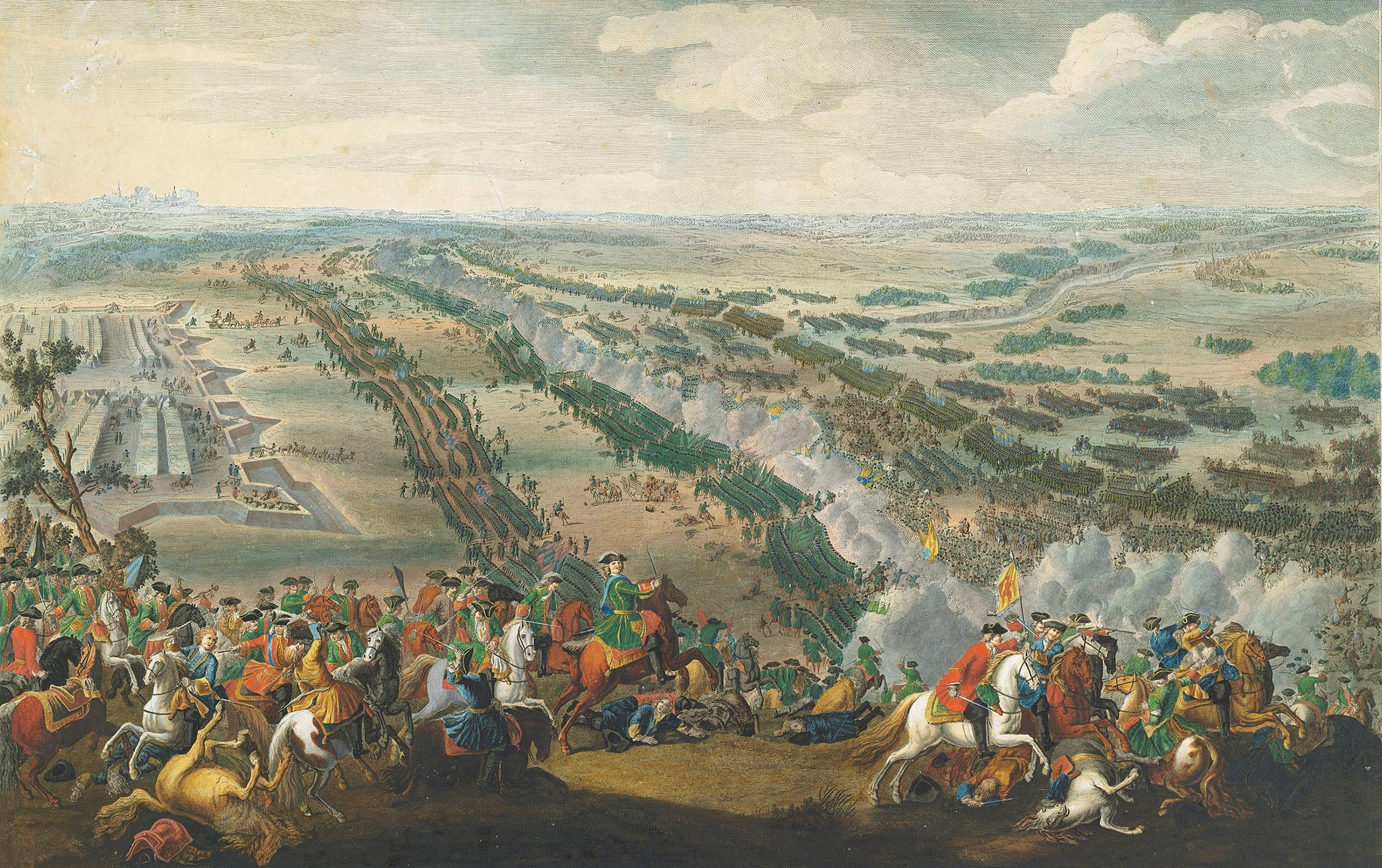
July 8: Great Northern War: Peter the Great drives Swedish forces out of Russia permanently in the decisive Battle of Poltava

1709 (MDCCIX) was a common year starting on Tuesday of the Gregorian calendar and a common year starting on Saturday of the Julian calendar, the 1709th year of the Common Era (CE) and Anno Domini (AD) designations, the 709th year of the 2nd millennium, the 9th year of the 18th century, and the 10th and last year of the 1700s decade. As of the start of 1709, the Gregorian calendar was 11 days ahead of the Julian calendar, which remained in localized use until 1923.

In the Swedish calendar it was a common year starting on Friday, one day ahead of the Julian and ten days behind the Gregorian calendar.

== Events ==
=== January–March ===
- January 1 – Battle of St. John's: The French capture St. John's, the capital of the British colony of Newfoundland.
- January 6 – Western Europe's Great Frost of 1709, the coldest period in 500 years, begins during the night, lasting three months, with its effects felt for the entire year. In France, the Atlantic coast and Seine River freeze, crops fail, and 24,000 Parisians die. Floating ice enters the North Sea.
- January 10 – Abraham Darby I successfully produces cast iron using coke fuel at his Coalbrookdale blast furnace in Shropshire, England.
- February 1 or 2 – During his first voyage, Captain Woodes Rogers encounters marooned privateer Alexander Selkirk, and rescues him after four years living on one of the Juan Fernández Islands, inspiring Daniel Defoe's novel Robinson Crusoe. After sacking Guayaquil, he and Selkirk will visit the Galápagos Islands.
- February 19 – Tokugawa Ienobu becomes the sixth shōgun of the Tokugawa dynasty of Japan, after the death of the shōgun Tsunayoshi, who had been head of government since 1680.
- February – In America, Mardi Gras is celebrated one more time with Masque de la Mobile in the capital of French Louisiana, Mobile, Alabama, before Mobile is moved 27 miles (43 km) down the Mobile River to Mobile Bay in 1711.
- March 28 – Johann Friedrich Böttger reports the first production of hard-paste porcelain in Europe, at Dresden.

=== April–June ===
- April 13 – The Raudot Ordinance of 1709 becomes law in the French colony of New France, legalizing slavery.
- April 21 – Mirwais Hotak takes control of Kandahar (in Afghanistan) by murdering the Persian governor, Gurgin Khan, known also as George XI.
- May 6 – The first influx into Britain of poor refugee families of German Palatines from the Rhenish Palatinate arrives in England. Most of them are Protestants en route to the New World colonies.
- June 17 – Trịnh Cương becomes the new king of northern Vietnam (Đàng Ngoài) upon the death of his grandfather, Trịnh Căn, and begins a 20-year reign until his death on December 20, 1729
- June 26 – The Battle of Fort Albany, an attack by 100 French colonial volunteers and Cree natives on the British Hudson's Bay Company outpost at Fort Albany on Hudson Bay. John Fullartine, commander of the post, leads a successful defense of the fort and 18 of the attackers are killed and then retreat. The site becomes part of a Cree First Nation reserve in the Canadian province of Ontario.
- June 28 – A treaty is signed in Dresden to re-establish an alliance between the Kingdoms of Denmark–Norway and the Electorate of Saxony, on behalf of King Frederik IV of Denmark–Norway and Saxony's King Augustus II.

=== July–December ===
- July 8 (June 27 Old Style; June 28 in the Swedish calendar) – Great Northern War: Battle of Poltava in the Cossack Hetmanate (Ukraine) – Peter the Great leads forces of the Tsardom of Russia to a decisive victory over Swedish forces under Charles XII, ending the Swedish invasion of Russia and effectively ending Sweden's role as a major power in Europe.
- July 9 – Christopher Slaughterford of London is executed in Guildford for the murder of Jane Young, his fiancée. He is the first person in modern England executed for murder based exclusively on circumstantial evidence, and he maintains his innocence to the last.
- July 13 – Production of Eau de Cologne is begun by perfumier Johann Maria Farina in Germany, founding Johann Maria Farina gegenüber dem Jülichs-Platz.
- July 26 – Reinhard Keiser's opera Desiderius, König der Langobarden is premiered in Hamburg.
- July 27 – Japan's Emperor Higashiyama abdicates after a reign of 23 years that began in 1687, and is succeeded by his son Yoshihito, who is enthroned as the Emperor Nakamikado.
- July 30 – War of the Spanish Succession: Tournai is captured by John Churchill, 1st Duke of Marlborough and Prince Eugene of Savoy.
- August 8 – The hot air balloon of Bartolomeu de Gusmão flies in Portugal.
- August 28 – Pamheiba is crowned King of Manipur.
- September 11 (August 31 Old Style) – War of the Spanish Succession: Battle of Malplaquet – Troops of the Dutch Republic, Habsburg monarchy, the Kingdom of Great Britain and the Kingdom of Prussia, led by the Duke of Marlborough, drive the French from the field, but suffer twice as many casualties.
- October 9 – War of the Spanish Succession: The British army captures Mons.
- October 12 – Chihuahua City in Mexico is founded.
- October 14 – The Chinese region of Ningxia is shaken by a 7.5 earthquake killing more than 2,000 people.
- December 25 – From London, ten ships leave for the New York Colony carrying over 4,000 people.
- December 26 – The first performance of the opera Agrippina by George Frideric Handel takes place at the Teatro San Giovanni Grisostomo in Venice.

=== Date unknown ===
- Herculaneum, an ancient town in Ercolano, Campania, Italy and buried under volcanic ash and pumice in the eruption of Mount Vesuvius in 79 AD, is discovered by accident when attempts to drill a well for a monastery encountered marble and other materials.
- The first modern edition of William Shakespeare's plays is published in London, edited by Nicholas Rowe.
- The first piano is exhibited in Florence by its inventor Bartolomeo Cristofori, who names it "gravicembalo col piano e forte", a name which is subsequently shortened to "pianoforte" and then "piano".
- A collapsible umbrella is introduced in Paris.
- Trinity School is founded as the charity school of Trinity Church, in New York City.
- The second Eddystone Lighthouse, erected off the south west coast of England by John Rudyerd, is completed.
- De Nostri Temporis Studiorum Ratione (On the Study Methods of Our Times) is published by Neapolitan philosopher Giambattista Vico.
- Priceless medieval altarpieces, created by Tyrolese sculptor Michael Pacher, are destroyed.
- Basil Lazarus III becomes Syriac Orthodox Maphrian of the East.

== Births ==
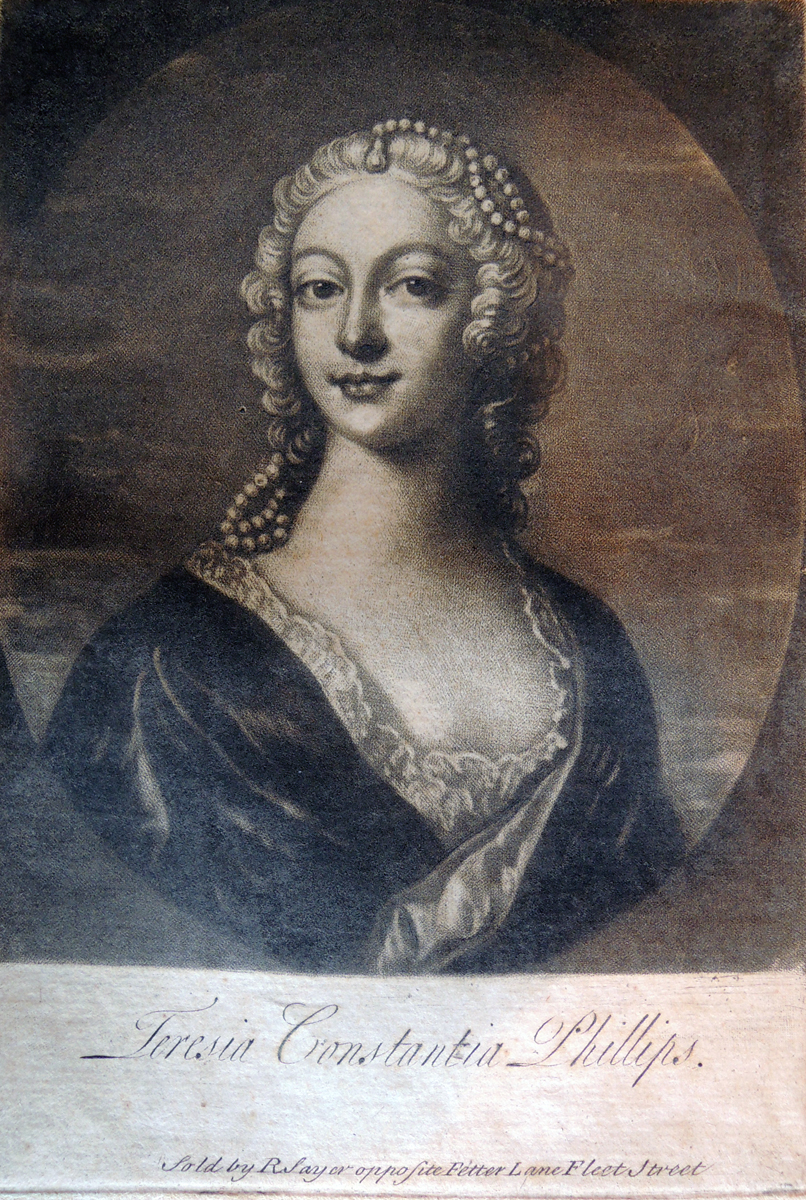
Teresia Constantia Phillips born 2 January

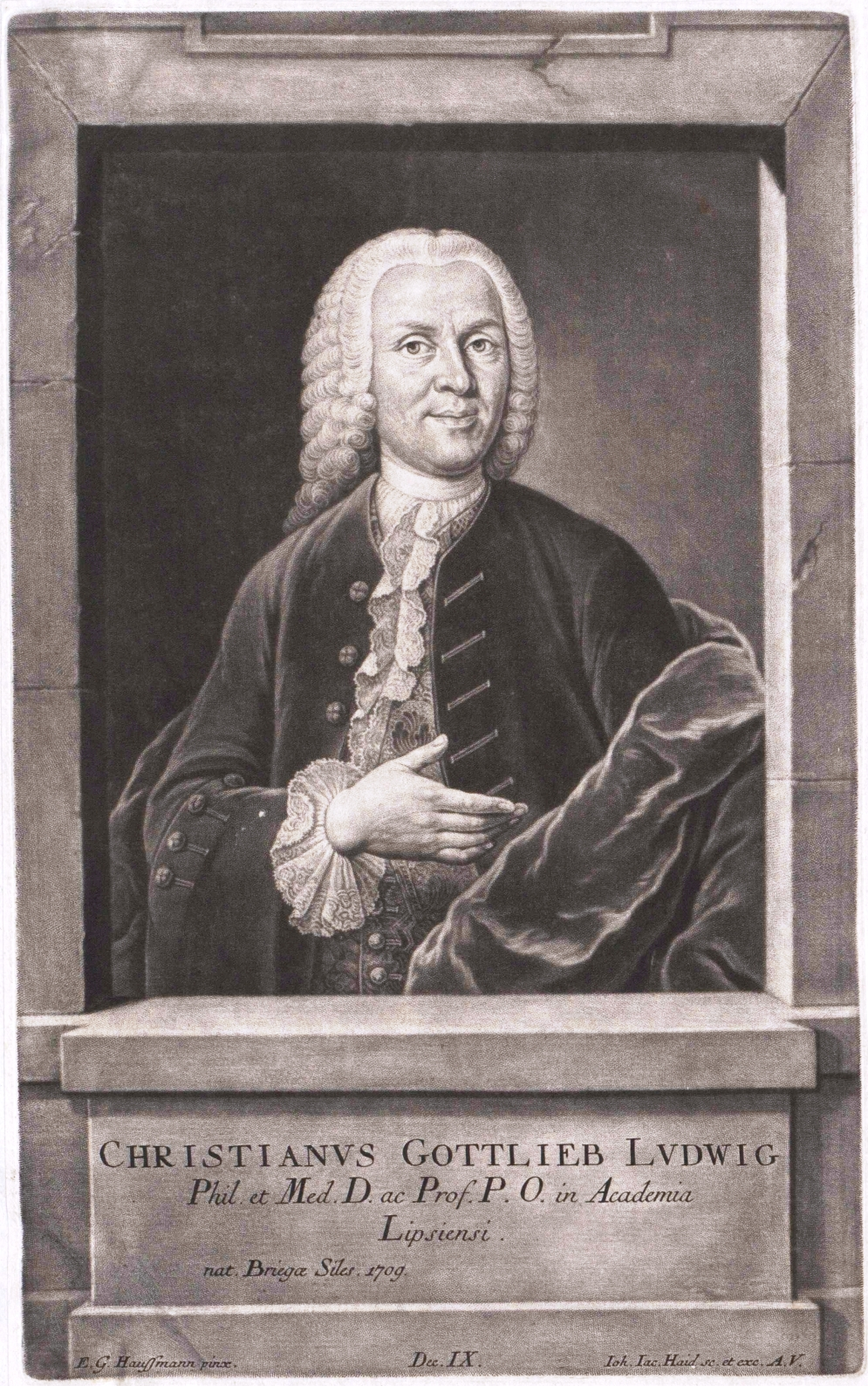
Christian Gottlieb Ludwig born 30 April

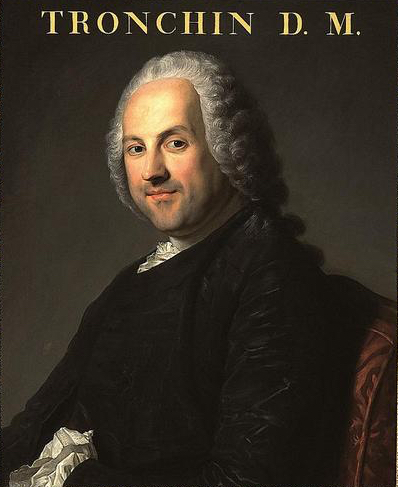
Théodore Tronchin born 24 May

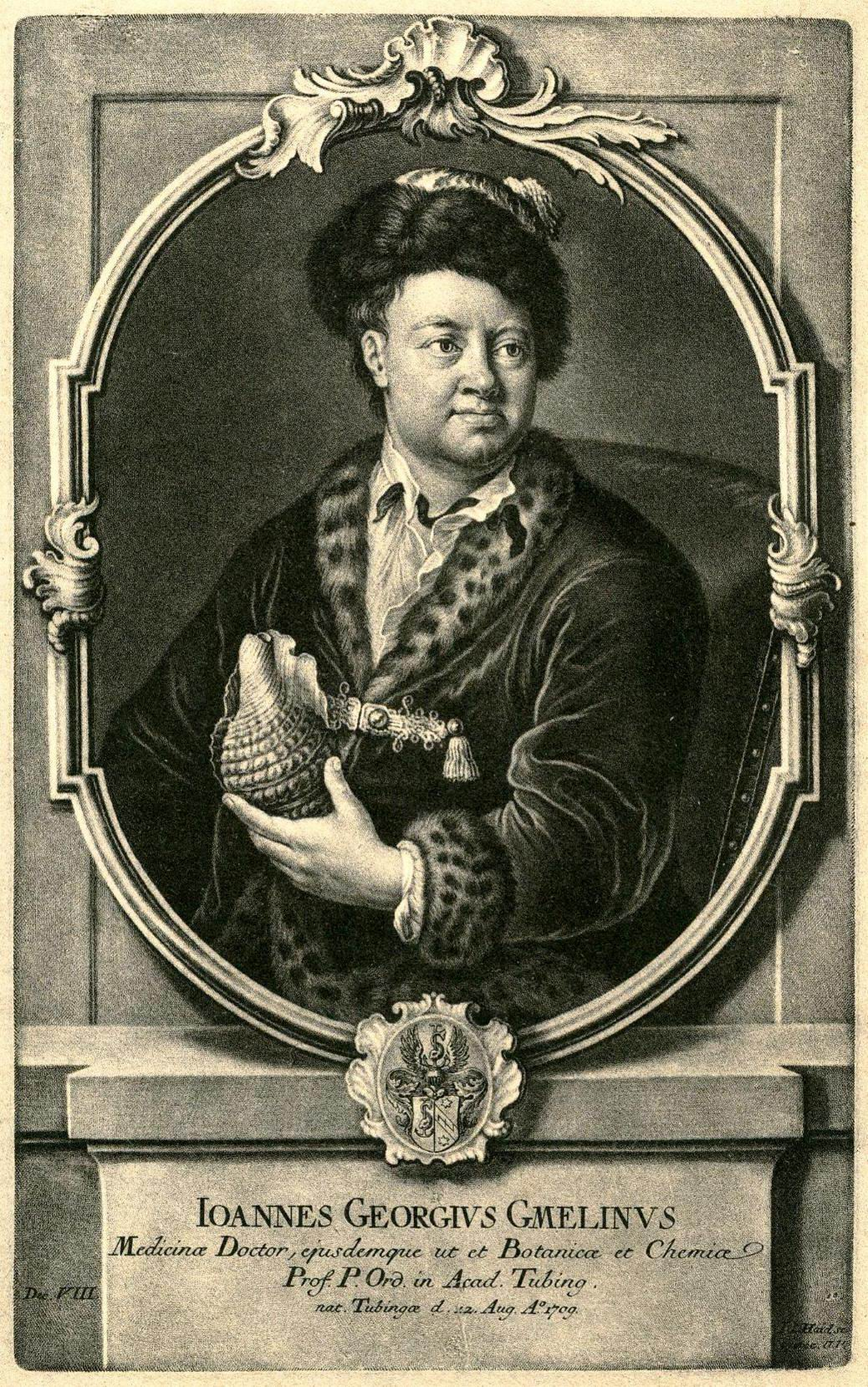
Johann Georg Gmelin born 8 August

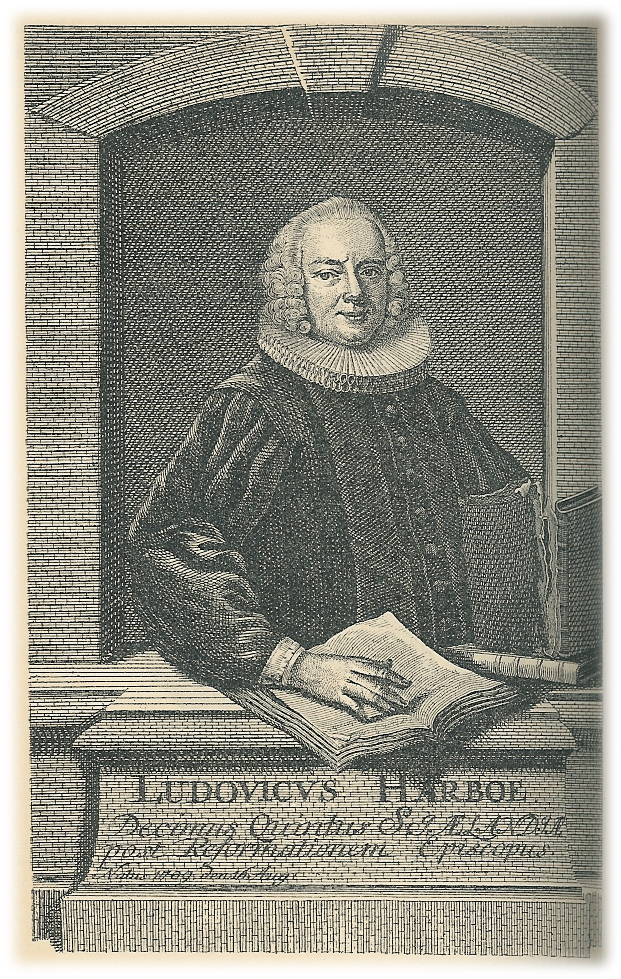
Ludvig Harboe born 16 August

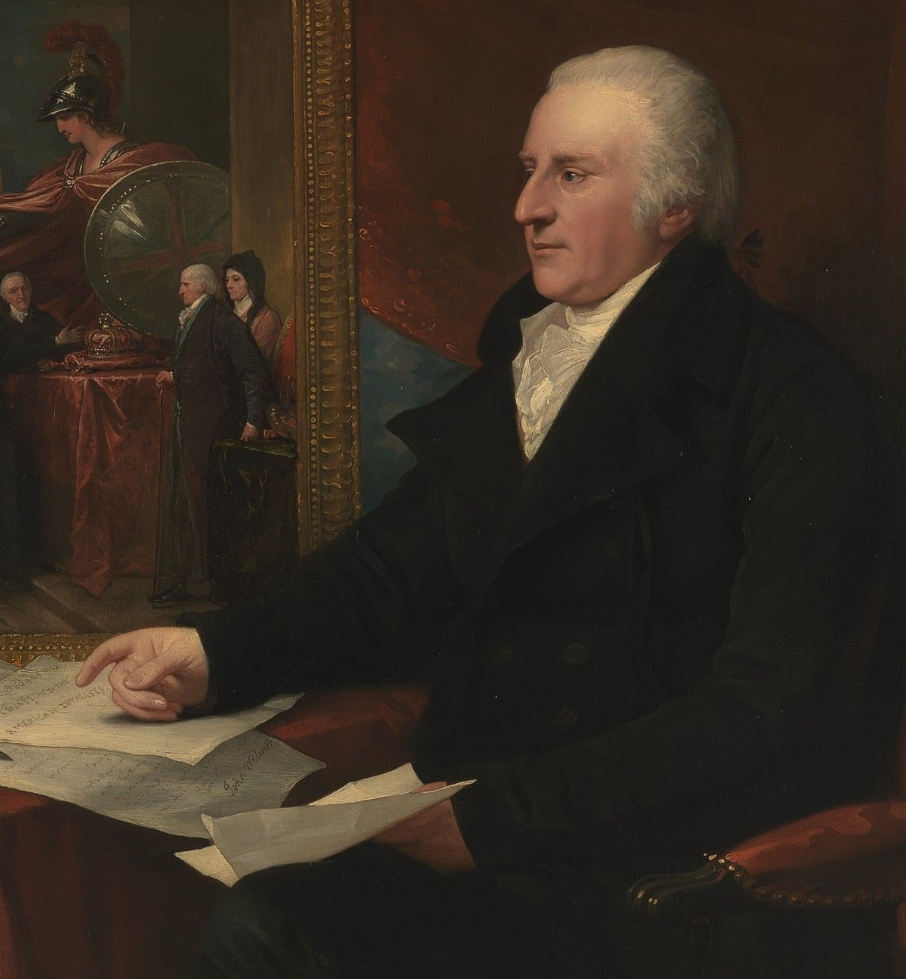
John Eardley Wilmot born 16 August

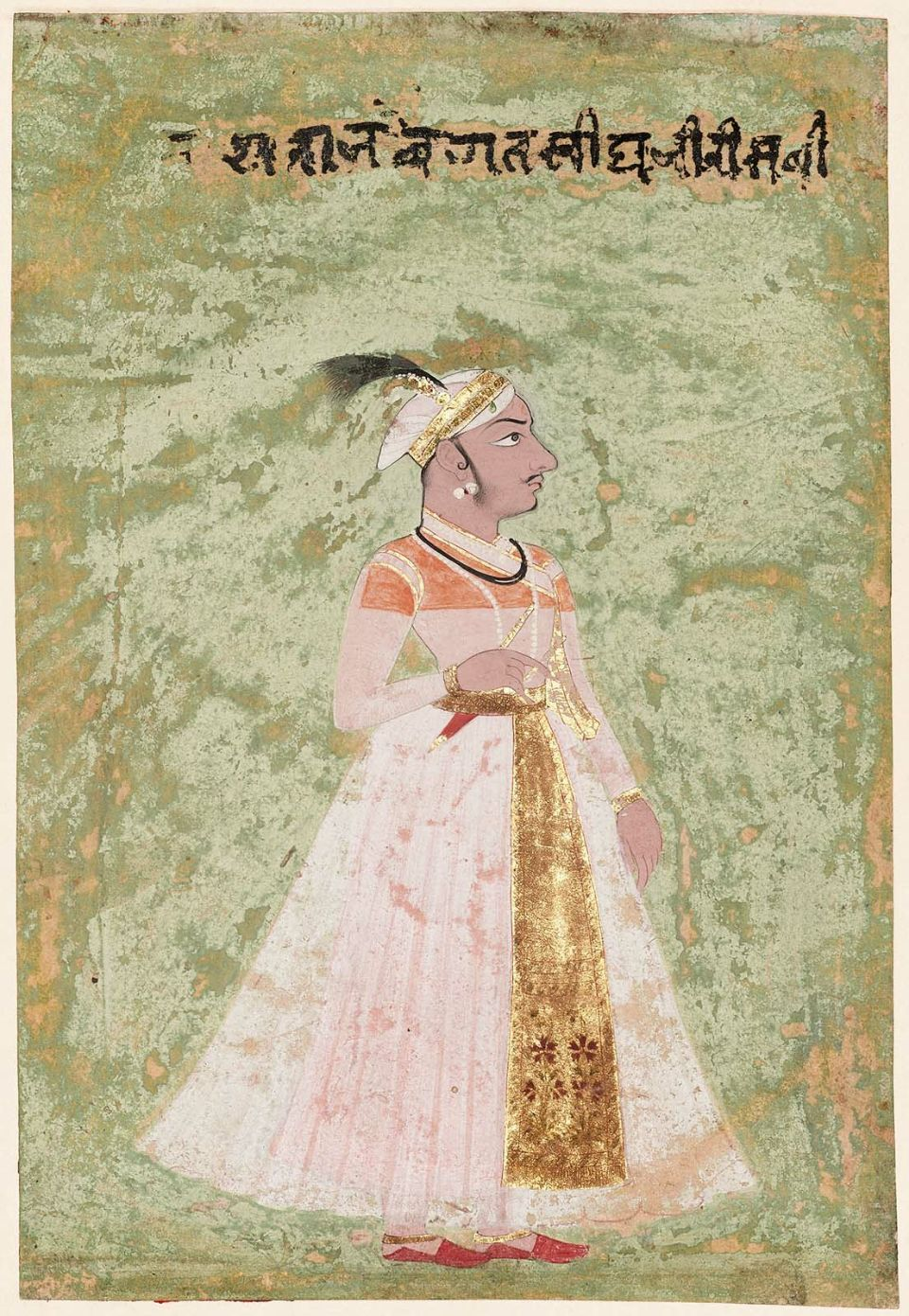
Jagat Singh II born 17 September

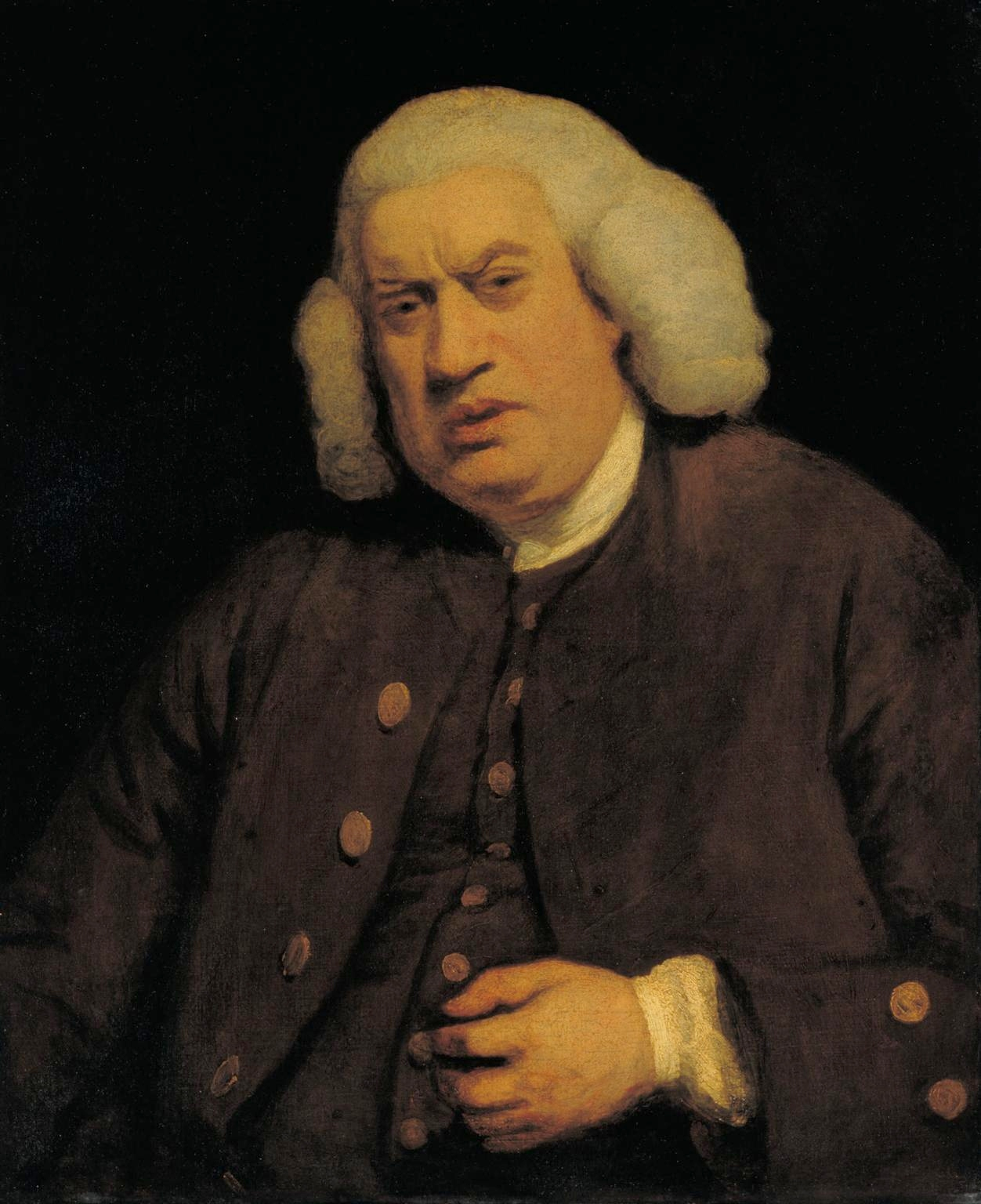
Samuel Johnson born 18 September

=== January–March ===
- January 2 – Teresia Constantia Phillips, British autobiographer (d. 1765)
- January 13 – Mollie Sneden, operator of a ferry service at Palisades, New York in the United States (d. 1810)
- January 17
  - Giovanni Ottavio Bufalini, Italian cardinal (d. 1782)
  - George Lyttelton, 1st Baron Lyttelton (d. 1773)
  - Margaret Rolle, 15th Baroness Clinton (d. 1781)
- January 24 – Dom Bédos de Celles, Benedictine monk and master pipe organ builder (d. 1779)
- February 7 – Charles de Brosses French writer (d. 1777)
- February 9 – George Venables-Vernon, 1st Baron Vernon, British politician (d. 1780)
- February 11 – William Courtenay, 1st Viscount Courtenay (d. 1762)
- February 12 – Jacques Barbeu-Dubourg, French physician (d. 1779)
- February 16 – Henrika Juliana von Liewen, Swedish political salonnière (d. 1779)
- February 24 – Jacques de Vaucanson, French inventor of mechanical automata (d. 1782)
- February 27 – Timothy Woodbridge American missionary, deacon, schoolteacher, judge, Superintendent of Indian Affairs (d. 1774)
- March 1 – William Bentinck, 2nd Duke of Portland (d. 1762)
- March 10
  - James Bentham, English clergyman (d. 1794)
  - Georg Wilhelm Steller, German botanist (d. 1746)
- March 14 – Sten Carl Bielke, scientist and member of the Swedish parliament (d. 1753)
- March 17 – Nicolò Arrighetti, Italian professor of natural philosophy (d. 1767)
- March 18 – Johannes Gessner, Swiss mathematician (d. 1790)
- March 31 – Louis-Charles Le Vassor de La Touche, French naval general, governor of Martinique, governor general of the Windward Islands (d. 1781)

=== April–June ===
- April 2 – Josiah Taft, farmer, local official, and Massachusetts legislator (d. 1756)
- April 6 – Thomas Hopkinson, lawyer (d. 1751)
- April 7 – William Stewart, 1st Earl of Blessington (d. 1769)
- April 14 – Charles Collé, French dramatist and songwriter (d. 1783)
- April 17 – Giovanni Domenico Maraldi, Italian-born astronomer (d. 1788)
- April 27 – Sir Francis Blake, 1st Baronet, of Twizell Castle (d. 1780)
- April 30 – Christian Gottlieb Ludwig, German physician and botanist born in Brieg (d. 1773)
- May 1 – Joachim Wasserschlebe, German-Danish diplomat (d. 1787)
- May 9 – Mihály Salbeck, doctor of philosophy, priest of the Society of Jesus, and teacher (d. 1758)
- May 24 – Théodore Tronchin, Genevan physician (d. 1781)
- May 27 – Margaret Lloyd, Welsh Moravian worker and activist (d. 1762)
- June 4 – Tomás Sánchez, veteran Spanish captain who founded Laredo (d. 1796)
- June 9
  - Nathaniel Booth, 4th Baron Delamer, English peer who served as Chairman of Committees in the House of Lords from 1765 (d. 1770)
  - Francis Towneley, English Catholic and supporter of the exiled House of Stuart or Jacobite (d. 1746)
- June 11 – Joachim Martin Falbe, German portrait painter (d. 1782)
- June 15 – Louis, Count of Clermont (d. 1771)
- June 28 – Nathan Tupper, farmer (d. 1784)

=== July–September ===
- July 4 – Antonio Orgiazzi il Vecchio, Italian painter active mainly in the Valselsia (d. 1788)
- July 5 – Étienne de Silhouette, French Ancien Régime Controller-General of Finances under Louis XV (d. 1767)
- July 10 – William Berners, English property developer and slave owner (d. 1783)
- July 11 – Johan Gottschalk Wallerius, Swedish chemist and mineralogist (d. 1785)
- July 15 – Antoine Matthieu Le Carpentier, French architect (d. 1773)
- July 17
  - Giovanni Carlo Bandi, Italian Cardinal who served as Bishop of Imola (d. 1784)
  - Friedrich Christian Baumeister, German philosopher (d. 1785)
  - Giuseppe Antonio Luchi, Italian painter (d. 1774)
- July 24 – James Harris, grammarian (d. 1780)
- August 8
  - Hermann Anton Gelinek, German monk and musician (d. 1779)
  - Johann Georg Gmelin, German naturalist (d. 1755)
  - Tokugawa Ietsugu, seventh shōgun of the Tokugawa dynasty (d. 1716)
- August 10 – Jean-Jacques Lefranc, Marquis de Pompignan, French man of letters and erudition (d. 1784)
- August 13 – William Clavering-Cowper, 2nd Earl Cowper, British noble (d. 1764)
- August 16
  - Ludvig Harboe, Danish theologian and bishop (d. 1783)
  - John Eardley Wilmot, English judge, Chief Justice of the Common Pleas (1766–1771) (d. 1792)
- August 18 – John Storr, officer of the Royal Navy (d. 1783)
- August 21 – Frederick Henry, Margrave of Brandenburg-Schwedt (d. 1788)
- August 26 – Guillaume Repin, French priest and martyr (d. 1794)
- August 29 – Jean-Baptiste-Louis Gresset, French poet and dramatist (d. 1777)
- August 30 – Frobenius Forster, German Benedictine (d. 1791)
- September 5 – Rudolf Füssli, Swiss painter (d. 1793)
- September 10 – Hachisuka Munekazu, Japanese daimyō of the Edo period (d. 1735)
- September 12 – Charles Somerset, 4th Duke of Beaufort (d. 1756)
- September 17 – Jagat Singh II, Maharana of Mewar Kingdom (d. 1751)
- September 18 – Samuel Johnson, English poet, biographer, essayist, and lexicographer (d. 1784)
- September 29 – Joseph Gerrish, soldier (d. 1774)

=== October–December ===
- October 5
  - Peter Applebye, British-Danish industrialist (d. 1774)
  - Ludovico Stern, Italian painter of the Rococo or late-Baroque period (d. 1777)
- October 6 – Edward Kynaston, British landowner and Tory MP (d. 1772)
- October 9
  - Jean-Baptiste de Belloy, Archbishop of Paris and cardinal of the Catholic Church (d. 1808)
  - John Clayton, English clergyman (d. 1773)
- October 12 – Lord Anne Hamilton, Scottish nobleman (d. 1748)
- October 13 – John Cole, 1st Baron Mountflorence, Irish peer and politician (d. 1767)
- October 16 – Johann Daniel Ritter, German historian (d. 1775)
- October 17 – Jean-Gabriel Berbudeau, French-born surgeon who spent time practicing medicine in eastern Canada (d. 1792)
- October 19 – Sewallis Shirley, British Member of Parliament in the reign of George II (d. 1765)
- October 25
  - Georg Gebel, German musician and composer (d. 1753)
  - Jan Wagenaar, Dutch historian (d. 1773)
- November 1 – Ignatius von Weitenauer, German Jesuit writer (d. 1783)
- November 2 – Anne, Princess Royal and Princess of Orange, Hanoverian-born regent of Friesland (d. 1759)
- November 6 – Christopher Marshall, leader in the American Revolution (d. 1797)
- November 15 – Dirk Klinkenberg, mathematician, amateur astronomer, secretary of the Dutch government for 40 years (d. 1799)
- November 18 – Henry Loftus, 1st Earl of Ely (d. 1783)
- November 22 – Johann Friedrich Wilhelm Jerusalem, German Lutheran theologian during the Age of Enlightenment (d. 1789)
- November 26 – Battle of Samana
- December 1 – Franz Xaver Richter, Austro-Moravian singer, violinist, composer, conductor and music theoretician (d. 1789)
- December 9 – Pierre II Surette, art of the Acadian and Wabanaki Confederacy resistance against the British Empire in Acadia (d. 1789)
- December 14
  - Caspar Friedrich Hachenberg, rector of the Latin school of Wageningen, The Netherlands, and writer of Greek and Latin grammars (d. 1793)
  - Charles Lawrence, British military officer who (d. 1760)
- December 18 – Elizabeth of Russia, empress regnant of Russia (d. 1762)
- December 21
  - Charles Frederick, MP (d. 1785)
  - Arnaud-François Lefèbvre, Apostolic Vicar of Cochin (d. 1760)
- December 24 – Johann Evangelist Holzer, Austrian-German painter (d. 1740)

== Deaths ==
- January 20 – François de la Chaise, French confessor of King Louis XIV (b. 1624)
- January 22 – Henry Herbert, 1st Baron Herbert of Chirbury, English politician (b. 1654)
- January 24 – George Rooke, English admiral (b. 1650)
- January 26 – Eleonore Charlotte of Saxe-Lauenburg-Franzhagen, Duchess of Schleswig-Holstein-Sonderburg-Franzhagen (b. 1646)
- February 8 – Giuseppe Torelli, Italian composer (b. 1658)
- February 9 – François Louis, Prince of Conti, French general (b. 1664)
- February 11 – Louise Hollandine of the Palatinate, German artist (b. 1622)
- February 17 – Erik Benzelius the Elder, Swedish theologian (b. 1632)
- February 19 – Tokugawa Tsunayoshi, Japanese shōgun (b. 1646)
- March 9 – Ralph Montagu, 1st Duke of Montagu, English diplomat (b. 1638)
- March 21 – Burchard de Volder, Dutch mathematician (b. 1643)
- April 1 – Henri Jules, Prince of Condé (b. 1643)
- April 2 – Giovanni Battista Gaulli, Italian artist working in the High Baroque and early Rococo periods (b. 1639)
- April 5 – Roger de Piles, French painter (b. 1635)
- April 8 – Wolfgang Dietrich of Castell-Remlingen, German nobleman (b. 1641)
- April 20 – Johann Ernst von Thun, Tyrolean Catholic bishop (b. 1643)
- April 21
  - Gurgin Khan (George XI of Kartli), Persian Governor of Kandahar (b. 1651)
  - Emmanuel Philibert, Prince of Carignano, Prince of Savoy (b. 1628)
- June 25 – Frederick VII, Margrave of Baden-Durlach from 1677 until his death (b. 1647)
- June 29 – Antoine Thomas, Belgian Jesuit astronomer in China (b. 1644)
- June 30 – Edward Lhuyd, Welsh scientist (b. 1660)
- July 17 – Robert Bolling, English settler in Virginia (b. 1646)
- August 24 – Elisabeth Dorothea of Saxe-Gotha-Altenburg, German princess (b. 1640)
- August 31 – Andrea Pozzo, Jesuit Brother, architect and painter (b. 1642)
- September 4 – Jean-François Regnard, French comic poet (b. 1655)
- September 7 – Gunno Dahlstierna, Swedish poet (b. 1661)
- September 14 – Luis Manuel Fernández de Portocarrero, Spanish cardinal and archbishop of Toledo (b. 1635)
- October 2 – Ivan Mazepa, Hetman of Ukraine (b. 1639)
- October 5 – Daniel Speer, German Baroque composer and writer (b. 1636)
- October 9 – Barbara Palmer, 1st Duchess of Cleveland, English mistress of Charles II of England (b. 1640)
- October 31 – Henry Hyde, 2nd Earl of Clarendon, English nobleman (b. 1638)
- November 4 – Barend Graat, Dutch painter (b. 1628)
- November 23 – William Bentinck, 1st Earl of Portland (b. 1649)
- November 29 – Charles Dormer, 2nd Earl of Carnarvon, English noble (b. 1632)
- December 1 – Abraham a Sancta Clara, Austrian preacher (b. 1644)
- December 7 – Meindert Hobbema, Dutch painter (b. 1638)
- December 8 – Thomas Corneille, French dramatist (b. 1625)
- December 15 – Sir Stephen Lennard, 2nd Baronet, English politician (b. 1637)
- December 31
  - Pierre Cally, French philosopher and theologian (b. 1630)
  - Sir Thomas Littleton, 3rd Baronet, English statesman (b. 1647)
- date unknown – John Coode, Colonial governor of Maryland (b. c. 1648)
- probable date – Eleanor Glanville, English entomologist (b. 1654)
