= Gelinek =

Gelinek is a surname. Notable people with the surname include:

- Hermann Anton Gelinek (1709–1779), German monk and musician
- Joseph Gelinek (1758–1825), Czech-born composer and pianist
