= Károly Salbeck =

- Bishop of Spiš
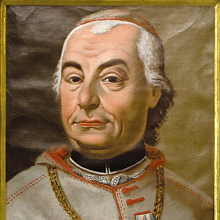
- Church: Catholic Church
- Diocese: Diocese of Spiš
- In office: 16 September 1776 – 15 June 1785
- Predecessor: Diocese erected
- Successor: Ján Révai
- Previous posts: Titular Bishop of Nemesi (1759-1776); Auxiliary Bishop of Vác (1759-1776)

Orders
- Ordination: 15 October 1746

Personal details
- Born: 17 November 1725 Galați, Principality of Moldavia, Ottoman Empire
- Died: 15 June 1785 (aged 59) Lőcse, Szepes, Kingdom of Hungary, Habsburg monarchy

Károly Salbeck of Petris (Galați Moldova, today Romania 17 November 1725 – Lőcse, Hungary (today part of Slovakia, 15 June 1787) was a doctor of theology, bishop of Szepes County, brother of Ferenc Salbeck and Mihály Salbeck.

== His life ==
He was one of the sons of Máté Salbeck, a salt trader. He studied at the Collegium Hungaricum in Rome, and became a priest at the Diocese of Transylvania. Between 1751 and 1776 he was canon of Kalocsa, abbot of Ercsi, bishop of Nemeia and provost of Vác. Between 1776 and 1787 he was the first bishop of Szepes and privy councillor to the Order of Saint Stephen.

== His works ==
- Sermo sacer ... habitus Jaurini die XV. Aug. 1774. in alteris sacerdotii soleniis exc., ill, ac. rev. dni Francisci e com. Zichy de Vásonkő episcopi Jaurinensi. Vacii.

== Sources ==
- Szinnyei, József (2000), Magyar írók élete és munkái [Life and Works of Hungarian Writers] (in Hungarian), Budapest: Arcanum, ISBN 978-9638602992
- PIM
