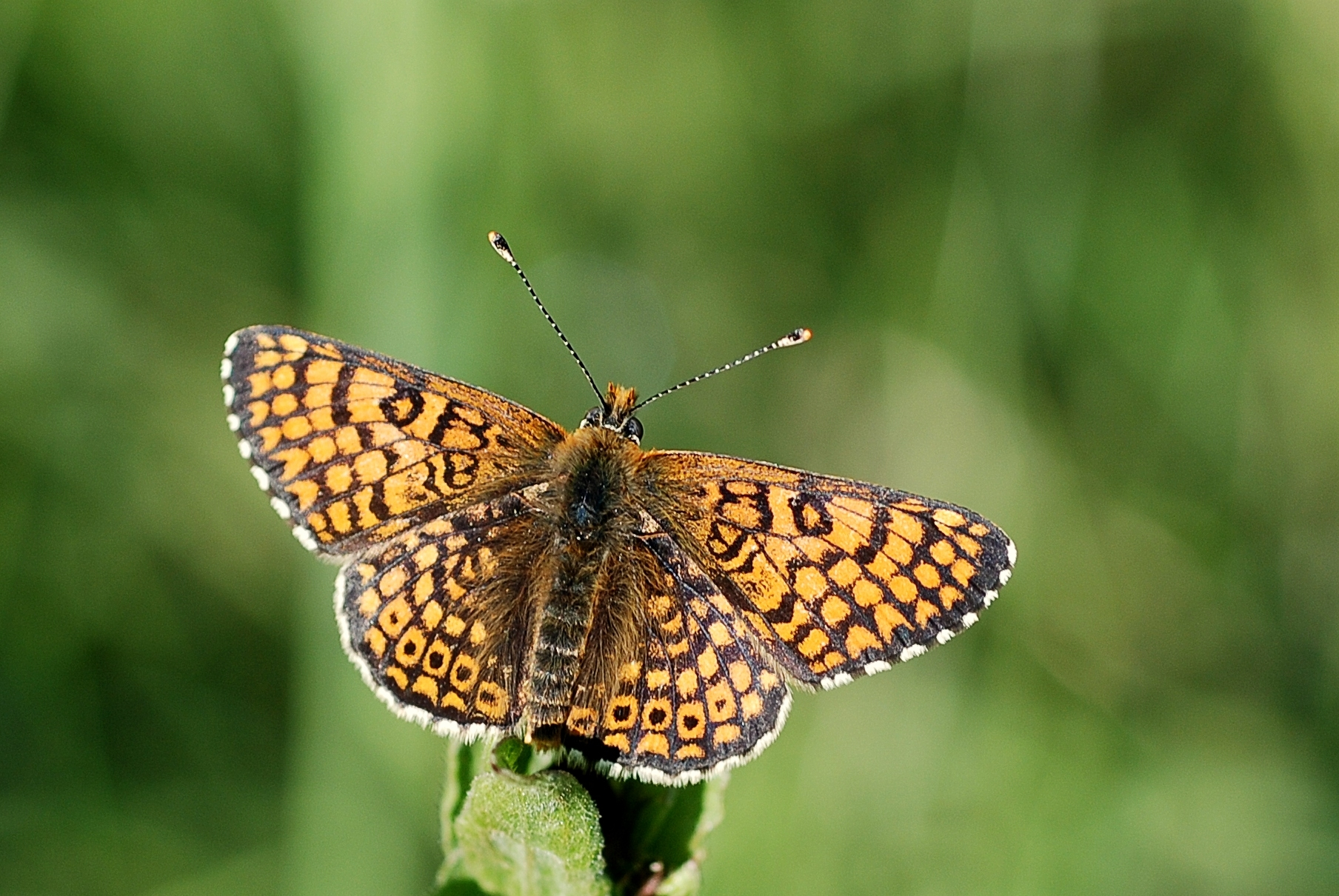
- Upperside
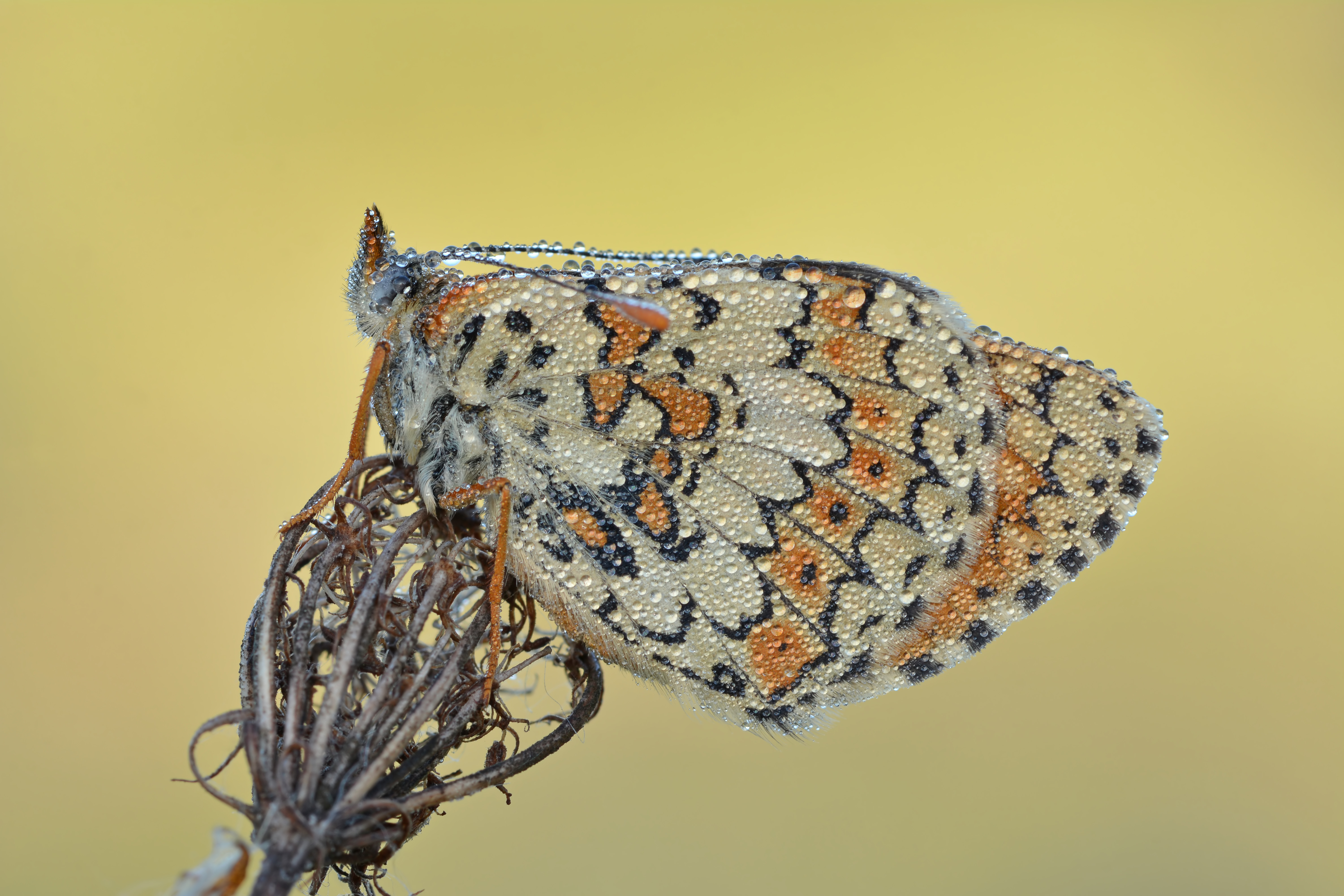
- Underside

Scientific classification
- Kingdom: Animalia
- Phylum: Arthropoda
- Class: Insecta
- Order: Lepidoptera
- Family: Nymphalidae
- Genus: Melitaea
- Species: M. cinxia

Binomial name
- Melitaea cinxia (Linnaeus, 1758)

Synonyms
- Papilio cinxia Linnaeus, 1758; Papilio pilodellae Rottemburg, 1775; Papilio delia Denis & Schiffermüller, 1775; Euphydryas cinxia

= Glanville fritillary =

Melitaea cinxia

Species of butterfly

The Glanville fritillary (Melitaea cinxia) is a butterfly of the family Nymphalidae. It is named for Eleanor Glanville, the naturalist who discovered it, and the checkerboard pattern on its wings. These butterflies live in almost all of Europe, especially Finland, and in parts of northwest Africa. They are absent from the far north of Europe and parts of the Iberian Peninsula. To the east they are found across the Palearctic (in Turkey, Russia, northern Kazakhstan, and Mongolia).

It has been discovered that this butterfly only mates one time in June or July and lays its eggs. It does not provide any protection to these eggs or care for the offspring. As adults, the Glanville fritillaries are short-lived; they spend most of their lives as caterpillars. As caterpillars, Glanville fritillaries enter a stage of diapause, which is a period of suspended development, during the winter time.

The spiked speedwell and ribwort plantain are the Glanville fritillary's preferred plants to lay eggs and to eat as larvae. Female butterflies will show a preference for one plant species over the other when deciding where to lay their eggs, but the caterpillars have no preference once they hatch. After entering the adult phase the fritillaries feed on nectar of the spiked speedwell and ribwort plantain, among others.

This species of butterfly is at risk of population decline because it is not a migratory species. Though widespread, populations in Finland are at risk because they are not able to travel great distances as easily as other species, such as monarchs, if their environment should suddenly become unsuitable.

== Taxonomy ==
The word fritillary refers to the checkered pattern of the butterfly's wings, which comes from the Latin word fritillus which means "dicebox". The name "Glanville" comes from the naturalist who discovered it, Lady Eleanor Glanville, who was an eccentric 17th- and 18th-century English butterfly enthusiast – a very unusual occupation for a woman at that time. She was the first to capture British specimens in Lincolnshire during the 1690s. A contemporary wrote

This fly took its name from the ingenious Lady Glanvil, whose memory had like to have suffered for her curiosity. Some relations that was disappointed by her Will, attempted to let it aside by Acts of Lunacy, for they suggested that none but those who were deprived of their senses, would go in Pursuit of butterflies.

— Moses Harris, 1776,

== Geographic range and habitat ==
The Glanville fritillary is found across Europe and temperate Asia. It is most commonly found on Åland (Finland), which host a network of about 4,000 dry meadows, the fritillary's ideal habitat. These butterflies commonly inhabit open grassland at an elevation of 0–2,000 metres (0–6,562 ft) above sea level.

=== Glanville fritillaries in the UK ===
In the UK the Glanville fritillary occurs only on soft undercliff and chine grassland and where its main larval food plant Plantago lanceolata (English plantain) occurs in abundance on sheltered, south facing slopes. The Glanville fritillary is a highly restricted species within the UK, being confined to the Isle of Wight and even there being largely limited to the southern coast. It also occurs in the Channel Islands, and since 1990 there has been a mainland site on the Hampshire coast, possibly the result of an introduction. There are small introduced populations on the Somerset coast and two in Surrey: one near Wrecclesham, and one at a nature reserve in Addington, near Croydon.

Historic UK records suggest a distribution which went as far north as Lincolnshire. However, by the middle of the 19th century the Glanville fritillary was known only from the Isle of Wight and the coast of Kent between Folkestone and Sandwich. It became extinct in Kent by the mid-1860s.

== Description ==
Melitaea cinxia has a wingspan of about 33–40 millimetres (1.3–1.6 in). These medium-sized butterflies have orange, black, and white "checkerspot" forewings. On the upper side of the hindwings they have a row of black dots. The hindwings have white and orange bands and a series of black dots inside them, also clearly visible on the reverse. Females are usually more dull than males with more developed black dots. In Seitz it is described - M. cinxia L. (65 e, f). Above uniformly pale yellowish red, marked with black, somewhat recalling a chess-board, the white fringes being checkered. A row of heavy black dots in the submarginal row of spots on the hindwing is characteristic. Excepting the pale yellow black-dotted apex, the forewing beneath uniformly reddish leather-yellow, with dispersed blackspots, which vary in number. The species though of wide distribution, has not developed into many races.

Caterpillars are about 25 mm long with a reddish-brown head and a spiny black body with small white dots.

Melitaea cinxia is rather similar to the heath fritillary (Melitaea athalia), but the beige and orange bands on the underwings are distinctive. Moreover, the latter one has no spots on the upperside of the hindwings.

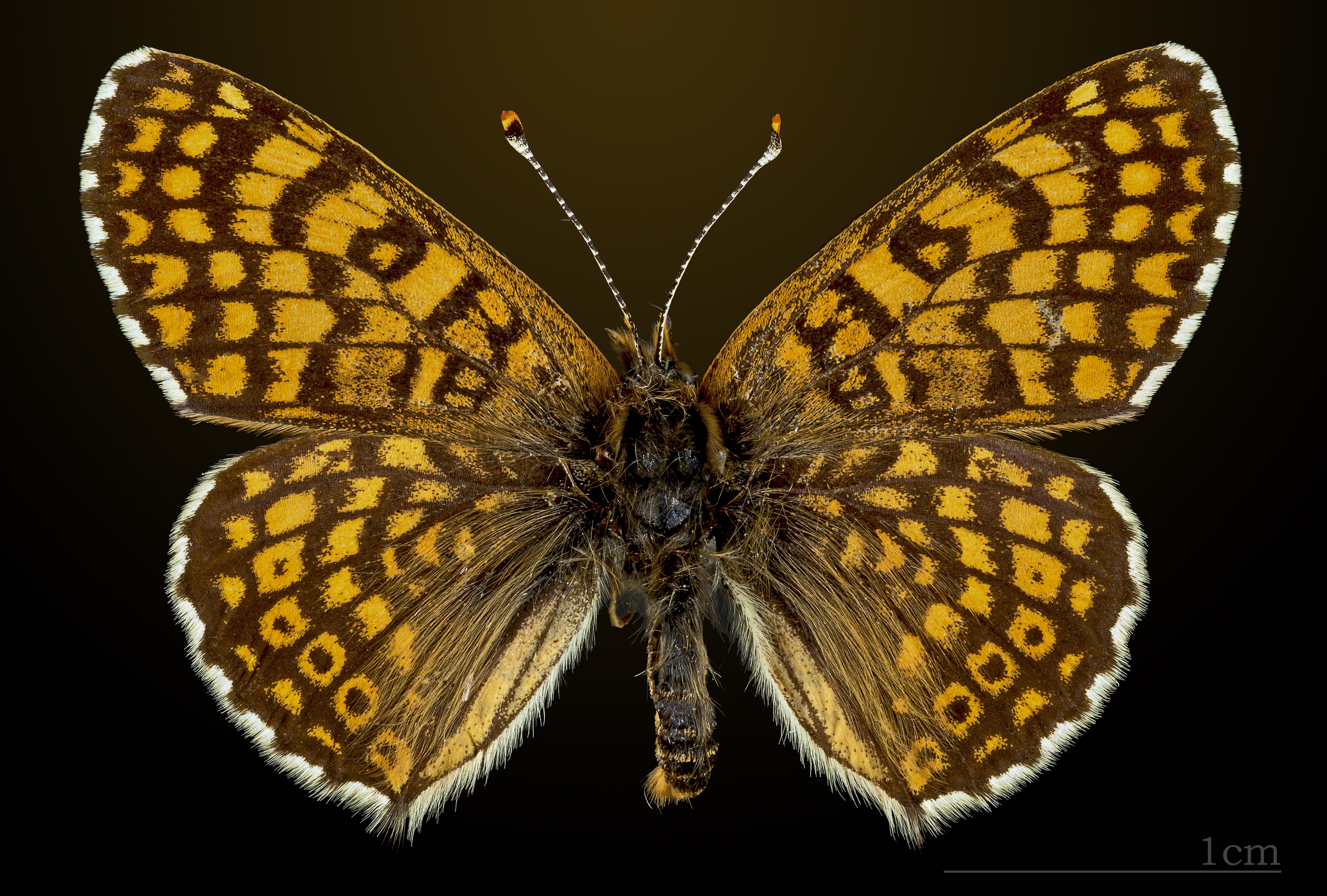
Upperside

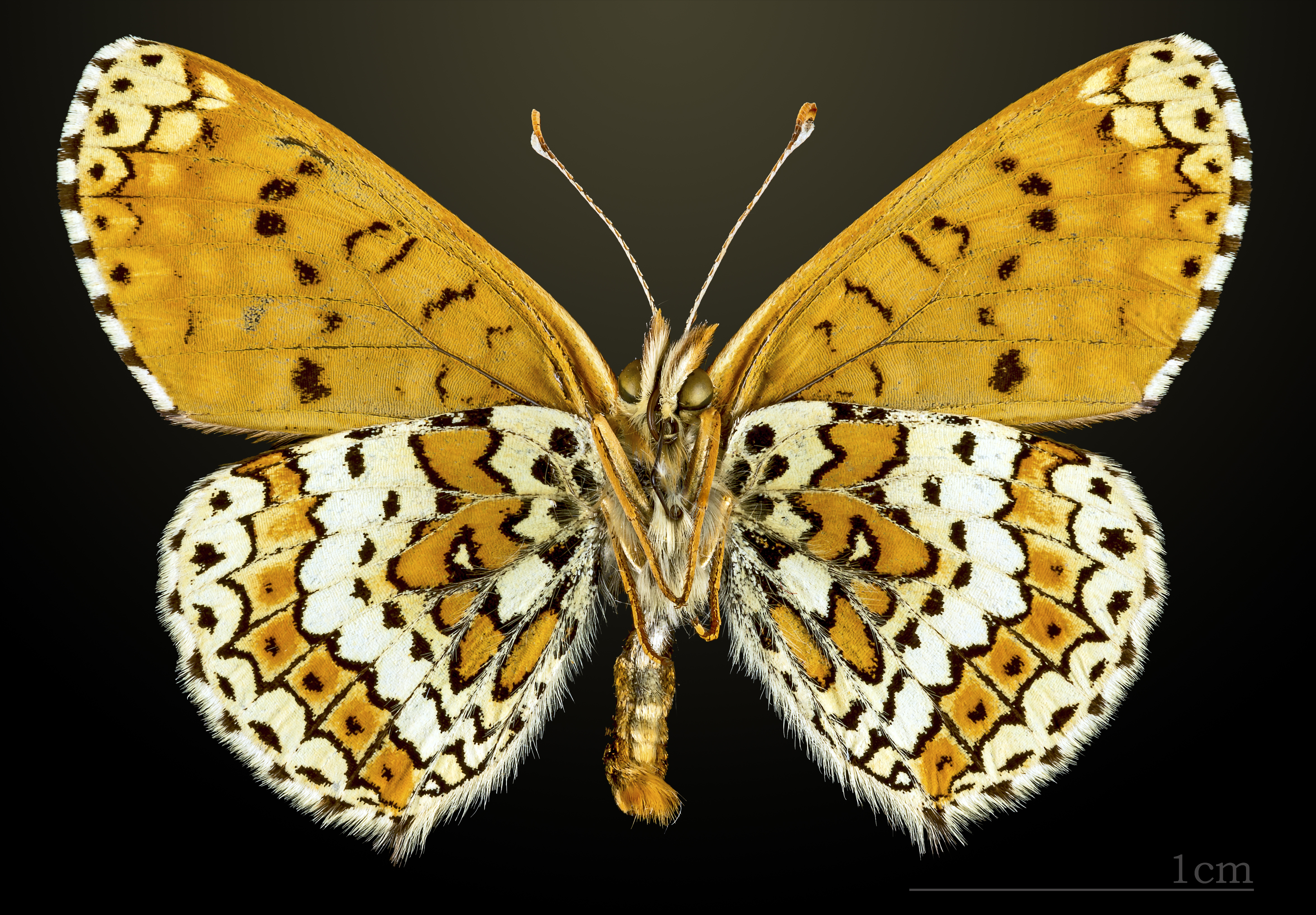
Underside

== Food Resources ==
=== Caterpillars ===
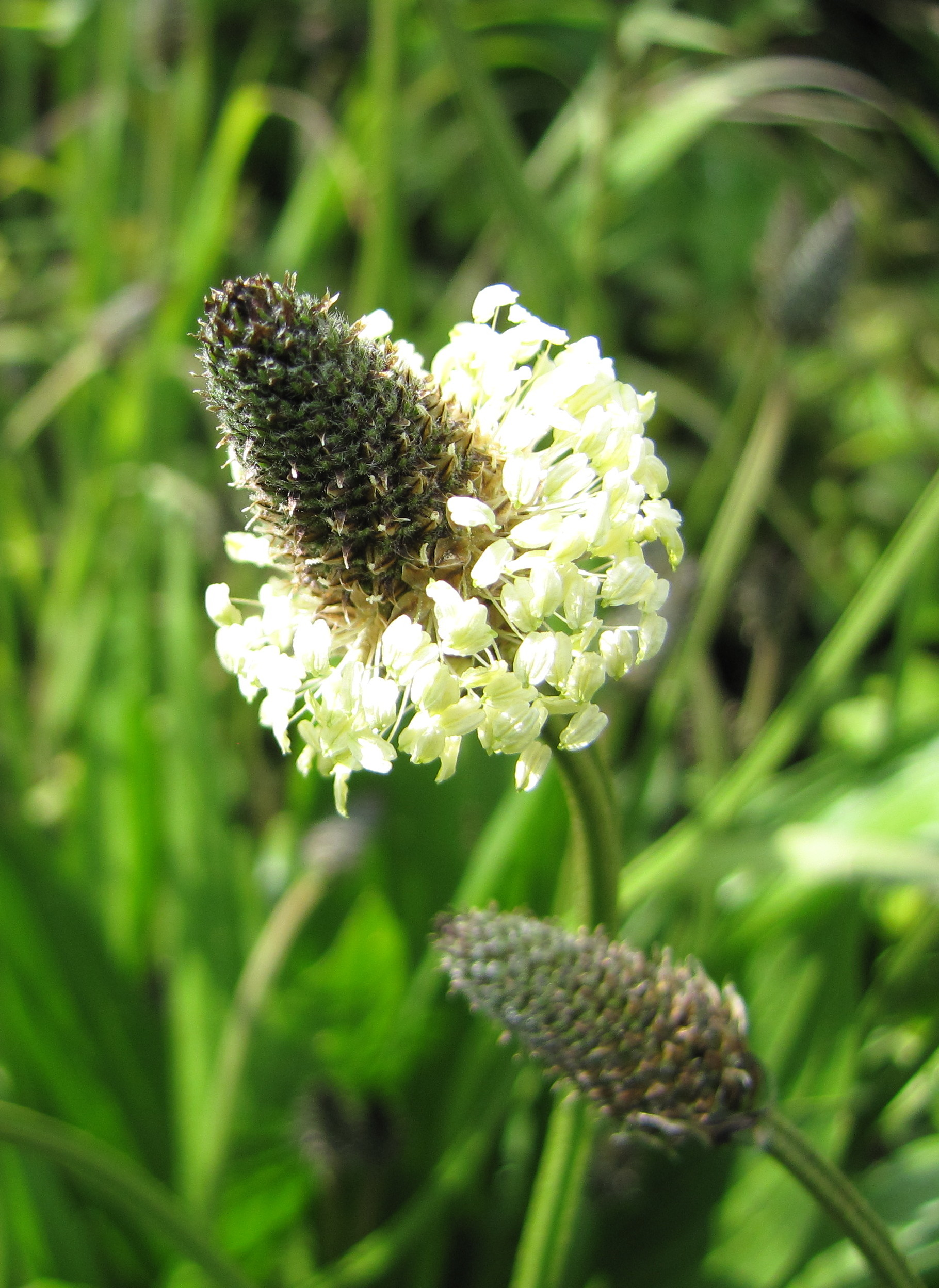
Ribwort plantain

After hatching, Glanville fritillary caterpillars live in gregarious sibling groups. They feed on their host plant, either Plantago lanceolata (ribwort plantain) or Veronica spicata (spiked speedwell). Adult females prefer one plant over the other when choosing where to lay their eggs, but the larvae do not have a feeding preference for either plant when they are born.

==== Spiked speedwell Defense ====
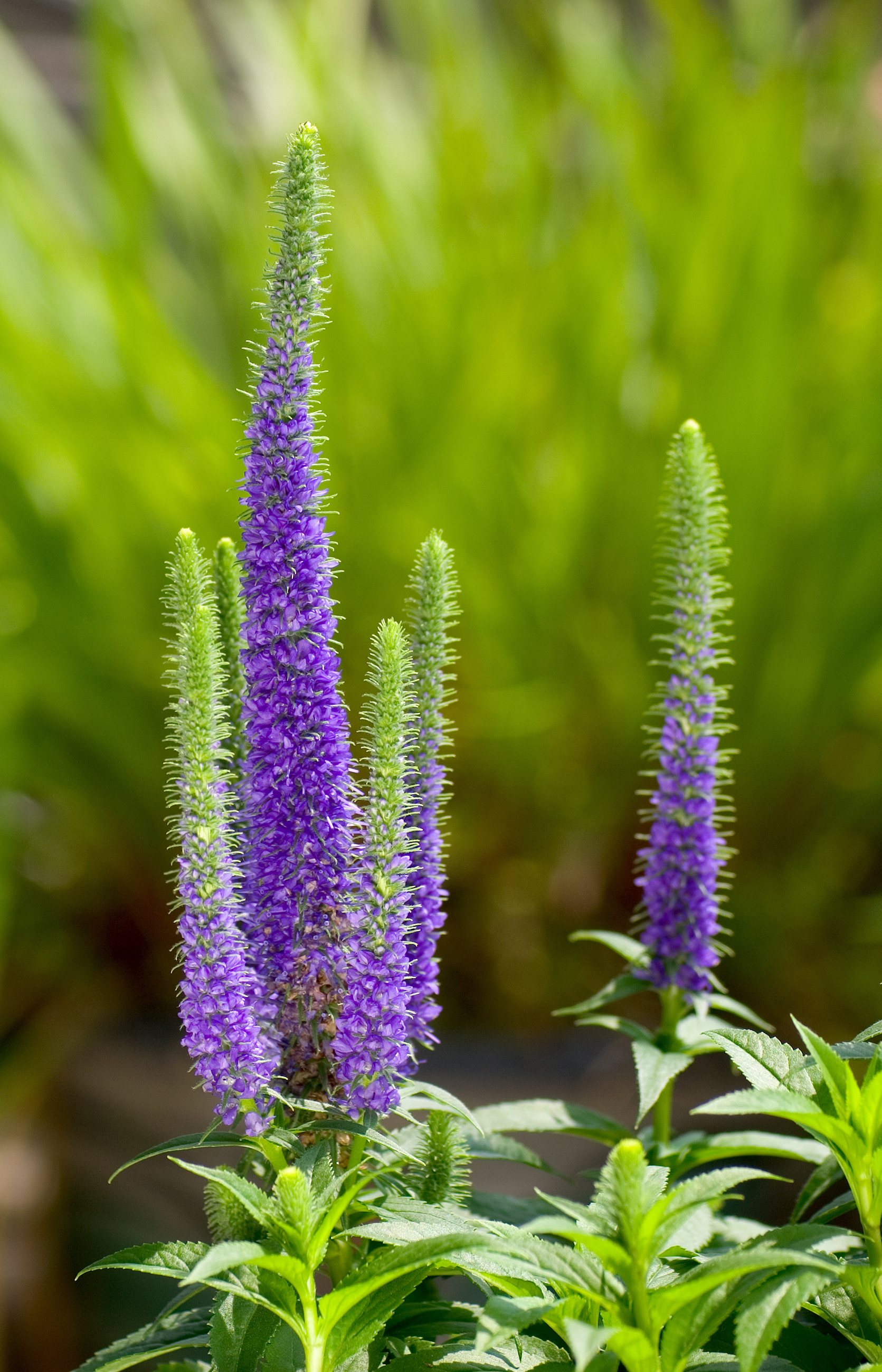
Spiked speedwell

As an attempt to fend off predators and parasitoids, the spiked speedwell emits volatile organic compounds (VOCs) when threatened. Some researchers found that this plant species has two different defenses for when it is being fed on and when a butterfly is in oviposition. The oviposition of the butterfly on this plant was able to induce the increase of two ketones (6-methyl-5-hepten-2-one and t-geranylacetone) and the suppression of green leaf volatiles (GLVs).

=== Adults ===
Adult Glanville fritillaries have a diet that consists solely of nectar. It has been shown that larvae with higher amounts of iridoid glycosides have better defense against parasitoids and bacterial pathogens.

== Mating ==
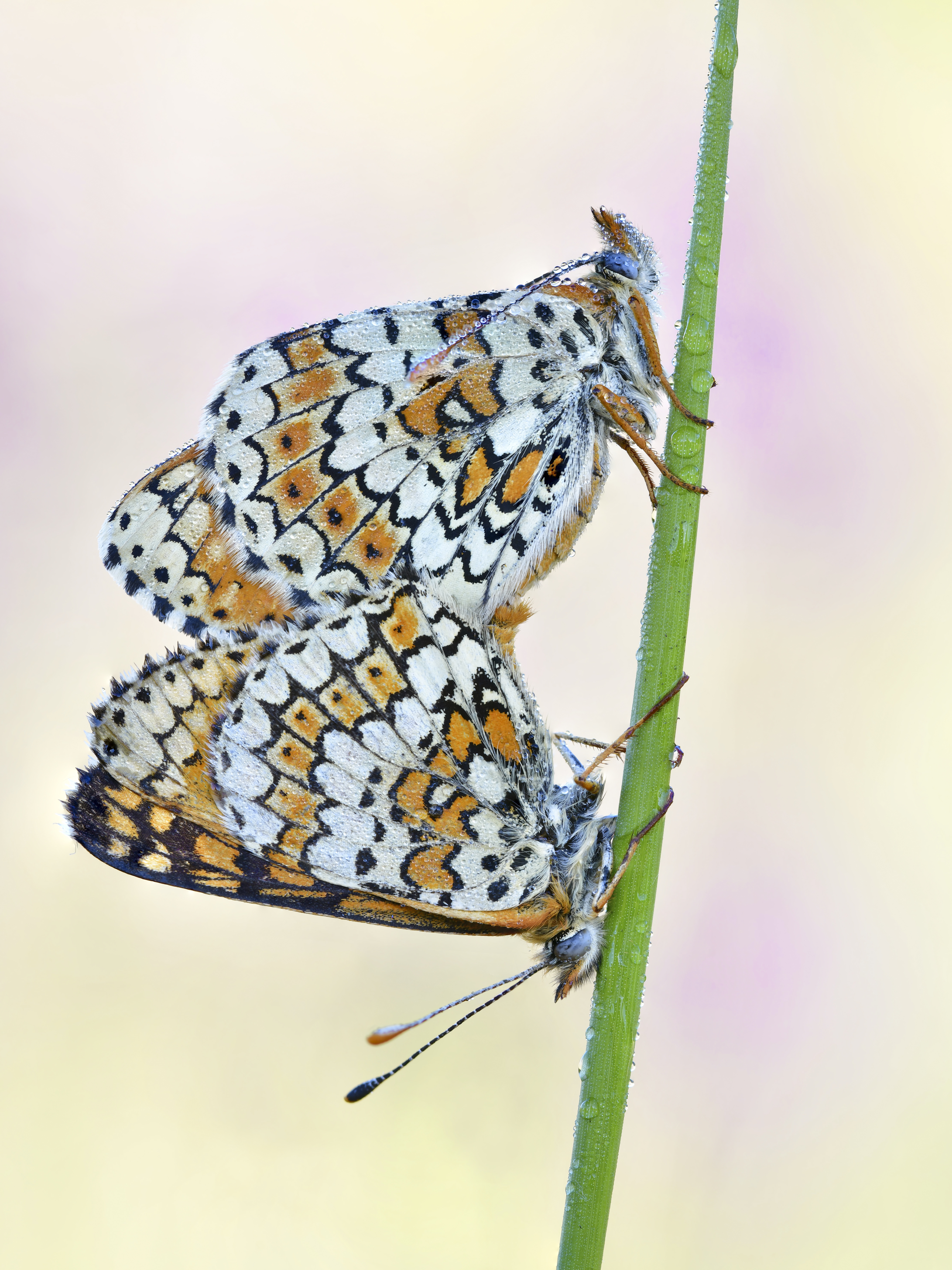
Mating

Adult Glanville fritillaries take flight, mate, and lay their eggs from June to early July. During this time it has been found that females only mate once. Females also tend to mate in their natal groups before dispersing with a mate to lay their eggs in a different population. This dispersal helps induce genetic flow between populations on the fragmented meadows of the Åland Islands.

== Life history ==
=== Life cycle (egg, caterpillar, pupa, adult) ===
A female Glanville fritillary will lay as many as 10 clutches of eggs in her lifetime. These clutches can range in size from 50 up to 300 eggs and are laid on the underside of the larval food plant of either Plantago lanceolata (ribwort plantain) or Veronica spicata (spiked speedwell). After hatching, the caterpillars feed on their host plants until the end of the summer where they spin a "winter nest" to diapause. When winter is over they emerge from their nest to feed again before pupating around the beginning of May. A month later, the adult fritillaries emerge and go about their adult lives of feeding, mating, and laying eggs.

==== Clutch size ====
In the Glanville fritillary, clutch size is highly important as larval survival depends on groups size. Thus, understanding the different factors that contribute to clutch size is important in developing an understanding of population dynamics and life cycle.

Clutch size is inversely related to the size of the clutches previously laid, meaning that the more eggs a female lays in years prior, the fewer eggs will be in the present clutch. Further, it is known that clutch sizes decrease with the age of the female. This is thought to be due to resource depletion over time in the female, potentially from high investment in earlier clutches.

Clutch size also increases with increased intervals between oviposition. Typical Glanville fritillary oviposition occurs once every two days.

=== PGI genotypes ===
Glanville fritillary females vary in their PGI, a glycolytic enzyme, genotype. The genotype of the female influences the time of day that she is active, which also influence her ability to lay larger clutches. Heterozygote females are able to operate earlier in the day compared to all other genotypes. Further, females with a Pgi-f allele are able to begin oviposition earlier in the day and are also able to lay larger clutch sizes. The Pgi-f allele contributes to a higher metabolic rate and the ability for females to take advantage of the climate of the early day - both of which factors allow for increased clutch size.

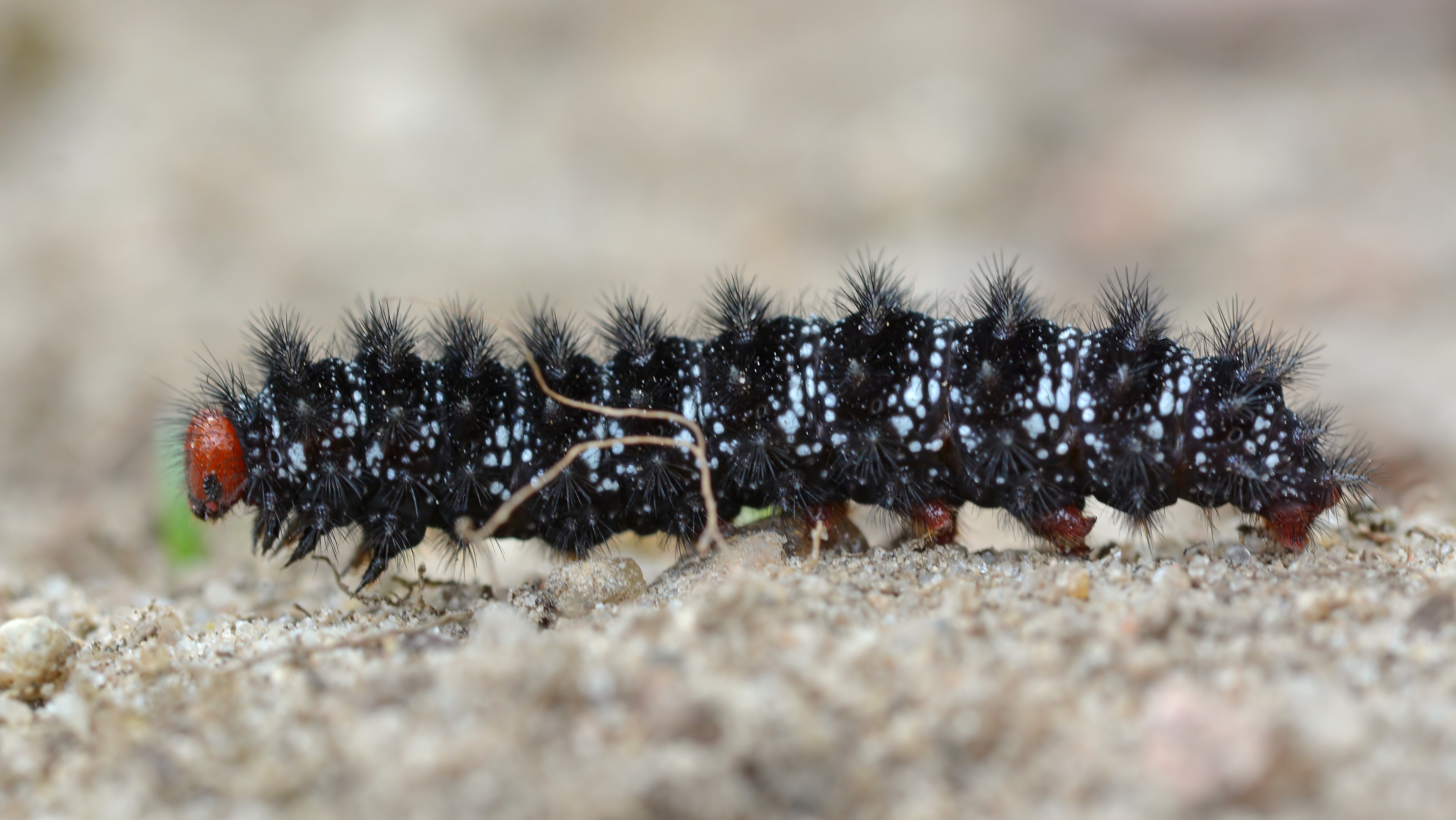
Caterpillar

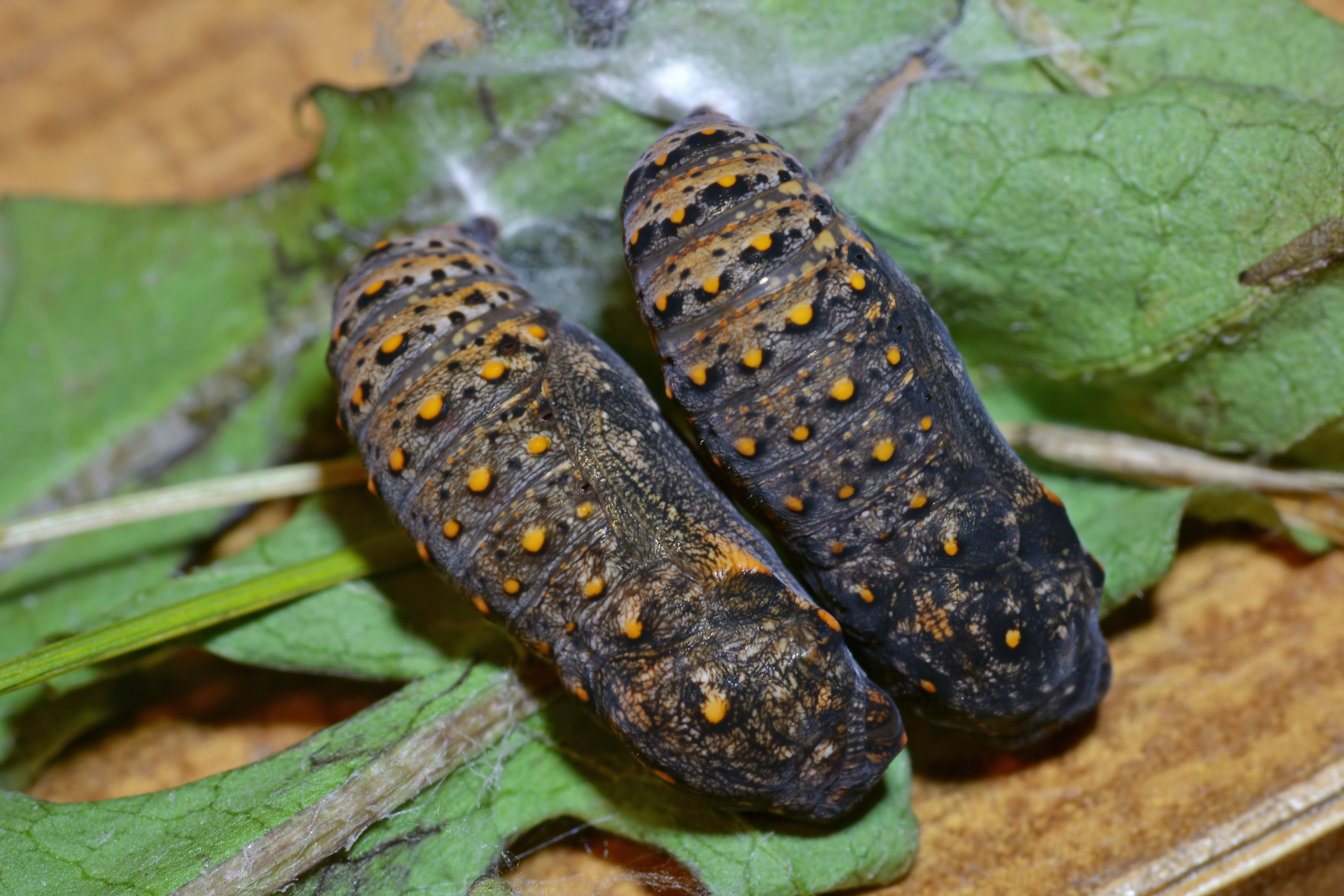
Pupa

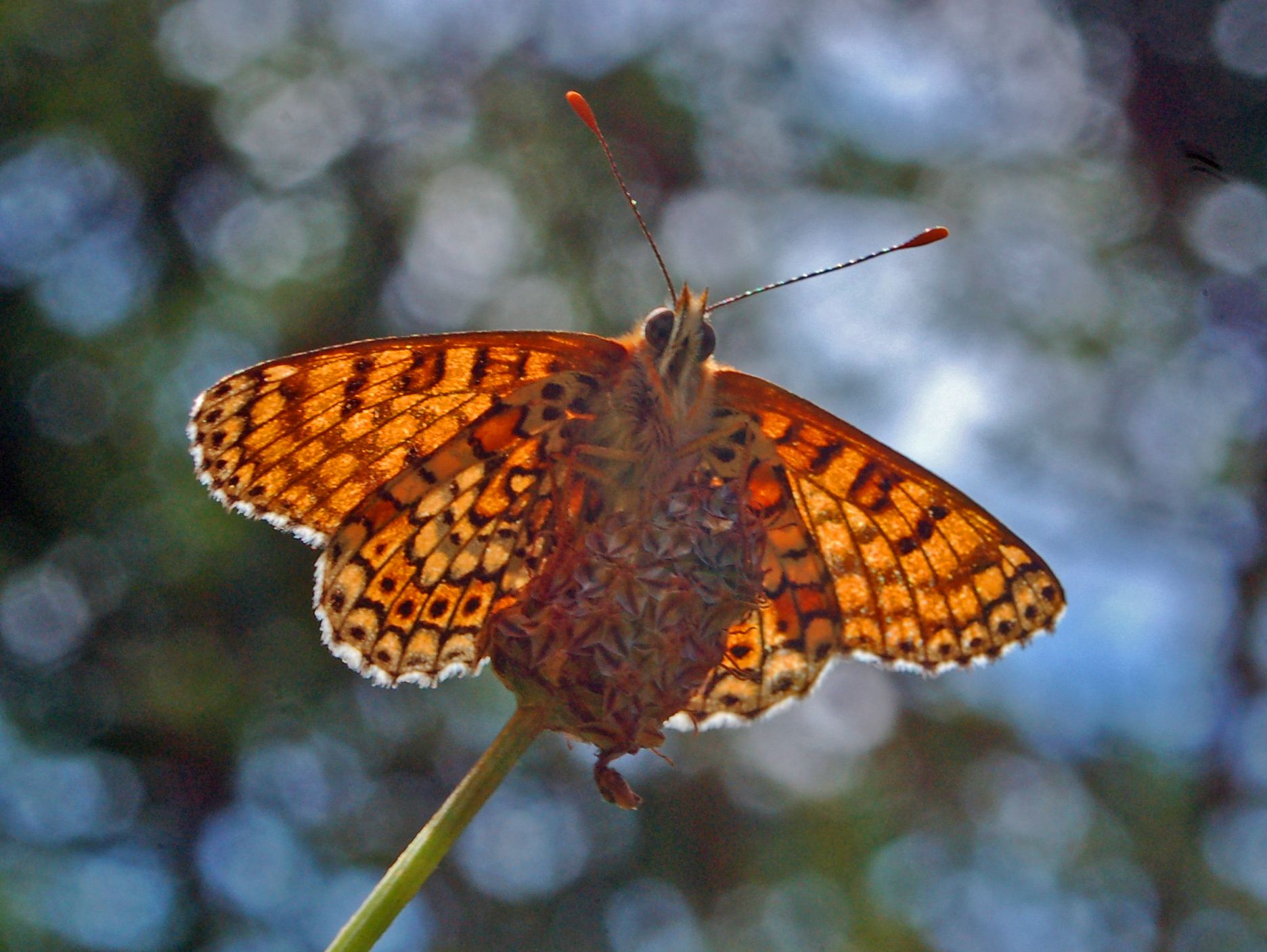
Imago

== Ecology ==
=== Parasites ===
Glanville fritillary eggs and pupae are often parasitized by several species of parasitoids. Two specialist species:

- Cotesia melitaearum
- Hyposoter horticola

And several generalist species:

- Pterolmalus apum
- Ichneumon gracilicornis
- Pteromalus apum
- Pteromalus puparum
- Coelopisthia caledonica

And has several hyperparasitoids

- Mesochorus stigmaticus (a specialist)
- Gelis agilis
- Gelis ruficornis
- Gelis acarorum

==== Cotesia melitaearum ====
The parasitoid C. melitaearum can be extremely detrimental to Glanville fritillary populations if it is able to become well established. This species is able to increase its own parasitism if the fritillary population is also increasing in size and age, but will decrease if said population becomes isolated. Thus, in well established fritillary populations there is a risk of local extinction by the C. melitaearum parasitoid.

== Genetics ==
=== Subspecies ===
A selection of previously designated Subspecies include:

- Melitaea cinxia amardea Grum-Grshimailo, 1895
- Melitaea cinxia atlantis Le Cerf, 1928
- Melitaea cinxia aversa Churkin & Kolesnichenko, 2002
- Melitaea cinxia cinxia (Linnaeus, 1758)
- Melitaea cinxia clarissa Staudinger, 1901
- Melitaea cinxia heynei Rühl, 1895
- Melitaea cinxia karavajevi Obraztsov, 1936
- Melitaea cinxia oasis Huang & Murayama, 1992
- Melitaea cinxia sacarina Fruhstorfer, 1917
- Melitaea cinxia tschujaca Seitz, 1908

== Conservation ==
=== Migration Issues ===
As the global temperature of the Earth warms each year, many butterfly species are forced to shift northward in order to keep living in their preferred climates. Scientists have found that migratory species, such as monarch butterflies, are better able to adapt to the rising temperatures than sedentary species, such as Glanville fritillaries. Glanville fritillaries will migrate around the Åland Islands to different habitat patches, but they will not embark on great transcontinental seasonal migrations like other butterflies do. Because of this they are very susceptible to climate change, which is something to keep in mind when considering plans to aid in the conservation of this species.

=== Status ===
This butterfly is not currently listed as threatened in Europe, but its UK BAP status is Priority Species. The NERC act of England lists it as species of principal importance. Its Butterfly Conservation priority is high, so this is a butterfly likely to be increasingly threatened in the coming years.

== Etymology ==
Cinxia (from Latin) - belted (cinctus - belt). The name reflects the appearance of the butterfly.

== General references ==
- Hanski, Ilkka; Saccheri, Ilik (2006). "Molecular-Level Variation Affects Population Growth in a Butterfly Metapopulation". PLOS Biol. 4 (5): e150. doi:10.1371/journal.pbio.0040129. PMC 1440940. PMID 16620151.
- Linnaeus, Carl (1758). Tomus, I (ed.). Systema naturae per regna tria naturae, secundum classes, ordines, genera, species, cum characteribus, differentiis, synonymis, locis (10th ed.). Stockholm: Laurentii Salvii. p. 48.
- Nieminen, M; Siljander, M; Hanski, I (2004). "Structure and dynamics of Melitaea cinxia metapopulations". In Ehrlich, PR; Hanski, I (eds.). On the Wings of Checkerspots: A Model System for Population Biology. New York: Oxford University Press. pp. 63–91. ASIN B001M4IPOG.
- Tolman, Tom; Lewington, Richard (2014). Guide des papillons d'Europe et d'Afrique du Nord (in French). Delachaux et Niestlé. ISBN 978-2-603-01649-7.
- Hanski, Ilkka (1999). Metapopulation Ecology. Oxford Series In Ecology And Evolution. New York: Oxford University Press. ISBN 978-0198540656.
