= Rudolf Füssli =

Swiss painter, art historian and lexicographer

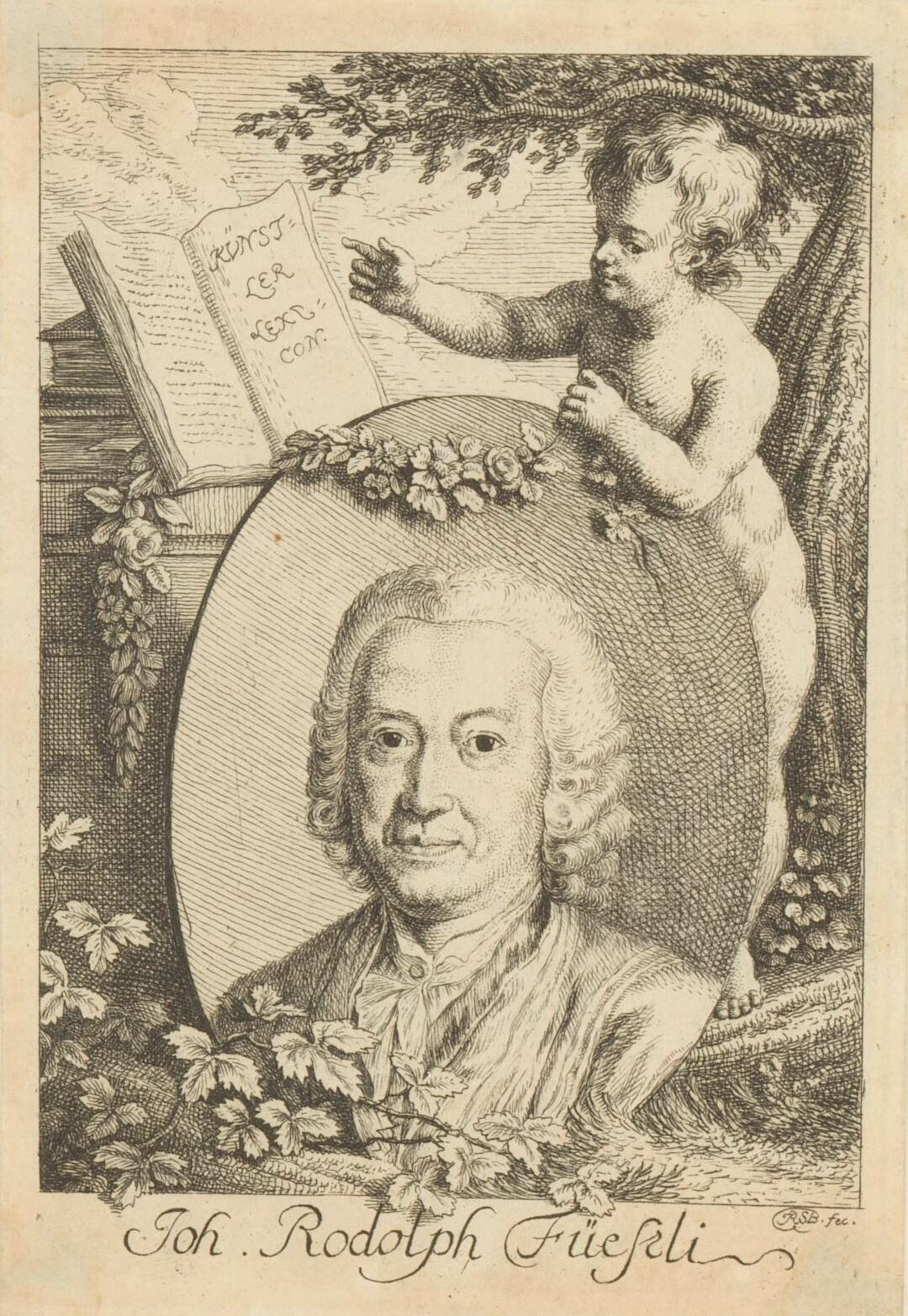
Rudolf Füssli

Rudolf Füssli (also Hans-Rudolf, Johann Rudolf, Füessli; born 5 September 1709 in Zürich; died 12 September 1793, ibid) was a Swiss painter, art historian and lexicographer.

Johann Rudolf Füssli was a son of the mayor Heinrich Füssli and his wife Dorothea, née Grebel. He was first apprenticed to the painter Johann Melchior Füssli in Zürich and then to Philipp Jakob Loutherbourg the Elder in Paris. From 1744 to 1746 he created the "New Year's Eve sheets of the Zurich fireworks society".

Füssli dealt intensively with art history and published in 1763 for the first time the Allgemeines Künstler-Lexicon. In 1779 appeared a new edition with a list of portraits of listed artists.

== Works ==
- General artist = Lexicon, or: Short message of the life and works of the Mahler, sculptors, master builders, engravers, art founders, steel cutters, [et]c. [et]c., together with an attached list of the portraits of the artist contained in this lexicon, described in alphabetical order, Heidegger and Compagnie, Zurich, 1763, (Digitized, Bavarian State Library).
- General Artist's Lexicon, or: Short Message of the Life and Works of the Mahler, Sculptors, Master Builders, Engravers, Art Casting Machines, Steel Cutter, [et]c. [et]c. : In addition to attached directories of teachers and students; also the portraits, the artist contained in this lexicon; Orell, Gessner, Fueesslin and Compagnie, Zurich, 1779 (Digitized, Bavarian State Library).

Georg Ludwig Eckhardt: Supplements to Füssli artist dictionary. Hamburgische Künstlernachrichten., L. F. Gauss, Hamburg, 1794, (online, Göttingen digitization center (GDZ)).

== Literature ==
- Gerold Meyer von Knonau (1878). "Füßli, Johann Rudolf der Jüngere". Allgemeine Deutsche Biographie (in German). Vol. 8. Leipzig: Duncker & Humblot. p. 260.
- Füssli, Rudolf in German, French and Italian in the online Historical Dictionary of Switzerland.
