= Giovanni Ottavio Bufalini =

Italian cardinal

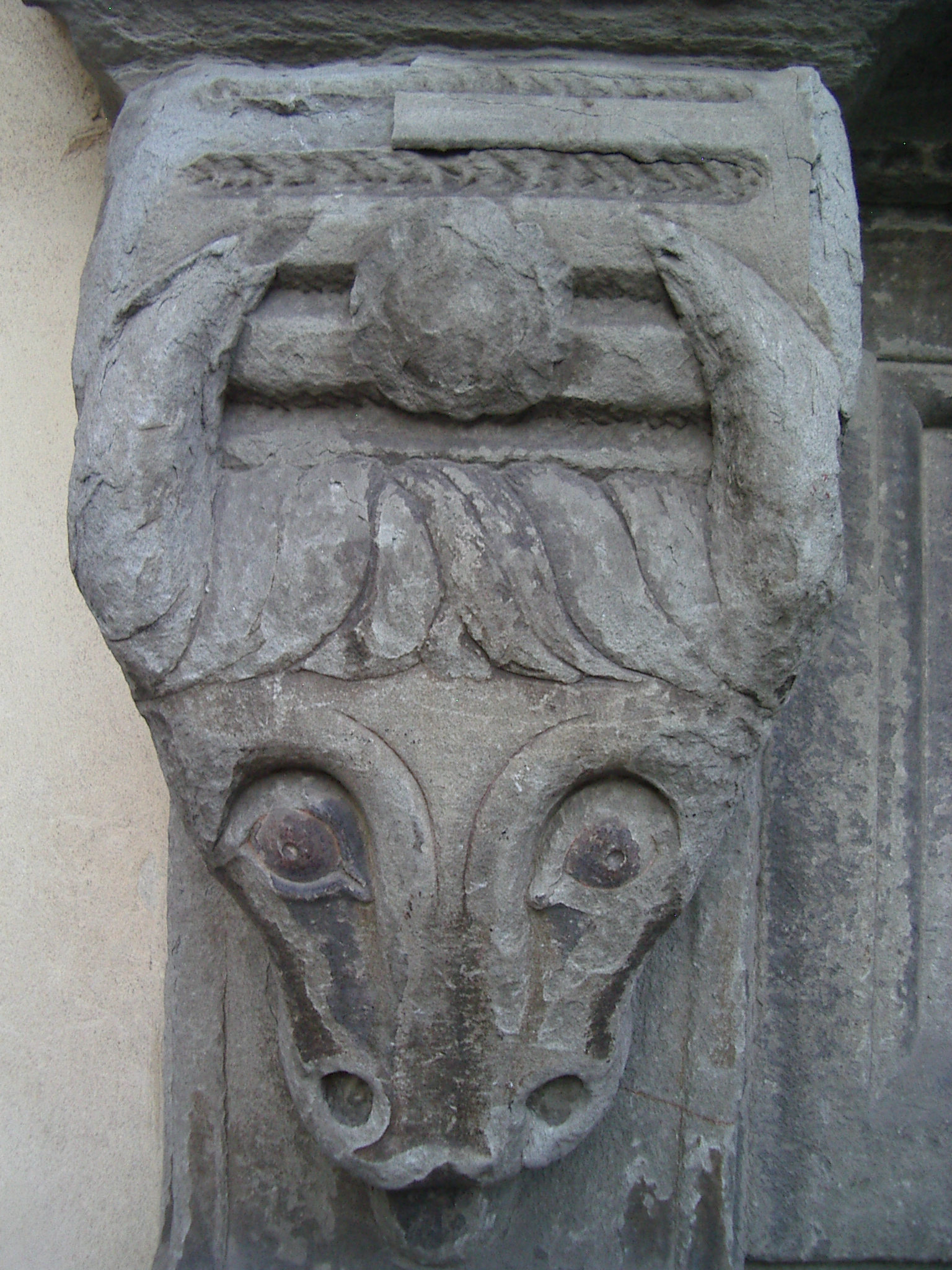
Coat of arms of the Bufalini family -Città di Castello- Umbria-Italy

Giovanni Ottavio Bufalini (17 January 1709, in Città di Castello – 3 August 1782) was an Italian cardinal.

Giovanni Ottavio was not ordained a priest until the age of 45 years in 1754. He was rapidly named Archbishop of Chalcedon, apostolic nuncio to Switzerland, and elevated to Cardinal within 12 years (21 July 1766). He was also appointed Bishop of Ancona and Numana.

He and Johann Baptist Anton Federspiel (the Bishop of Chur) worked against the League of the House of God and he later approved the dissolution of the priory of Reichenau.
