= Jean-Gabriel Berbudeau =

Jean-Gabriel Berbudeau (October 17, 1709 – January 4, 1792) was a French-born surgeon who spent time practicing medicine in eastern Canada.

Berbudeau's arrival in Canada is not documented but it is known that he was at Louisbourg in 1743, as there is a record of his marriage at that location He was present in Canada most of the period from then to 1758. During that period he held a number of important positions. In 1759 he returned to France with a group of Acadian refugees and first settled in La Rochelle, afterwards serving among those who had settled in Poitou.

He was one of the first accredited surgeons to practice among a civilian population in Canada, providing medical care that helped to sustain a growing population at a crucial time.
