= Antonio Orgiazzi il Vecchio =

Italian painter

Giovanni Antonio Salvatore Orgiazzi, also called Antonio il Vecchio, (4 July 1709 – 17 May 1788) was an Italian painter active mainly in the Valselsia, including at Varallo and Vercelli.

He was born and died in Varallo. He painted for the Sacro Monte di Varallo (1728–1731); the Sacro Monte di Orta (1731); the church of San Giacomo at Varallo; the Sanctuary of the Madonna della Fontana at Azoglio of Crevacuore; and the church of San Pietro e Paolo at Boccioleto. He was the father of Rocco Orgiazzi, also a painter. Rocco's son, Giacomo Orgiazzi was an engraver and cartographer.
