= Nathan Tupper =

Canadian politician

Nathan Tupper (June 28, 1709 – April 4, 1784) was a farmer, merchant and political figure in Nova Scotia.

He was born in Sandwich, Massachusetts on June 28, 1709, the son of Medad and Hannah. In 1739, he married Experience Gibbs. Experience was descended from Richard Warren, passenger on the ship Mayflower. Nathan first left Sandwich, MA in 1736 to live in Rochester, Massachusetts. He went to Nova Scotia in 1760. He was also involved in the lumber trade. He represented Liverpool township in the Nova Scotia House of Assembly from 1761 to 1764, resigning on April 3, 1764, as being unable to attend. He died in Liverpool, Nova Scotia on April 4, 1784 "falling in a fit on the way to church" at the age of 84.

Nathan's grandmother was Martha Mayhew, daughter of Thomas Mayhew, the first colonial governor of Martha's Vineyard. His grandfather Captain Thomas Tupper was one of the first selectman appointed for Sandwich, Massachusetts, was appointed by the General Court at Plymouth as captain of the military company of Sandwich, and was a missionary to the "Praying Indians" and donated land and built a church in 1688 which stood until 1757.
