= Friedrich Christian Baumeister =

German philosopher (1709–1785)

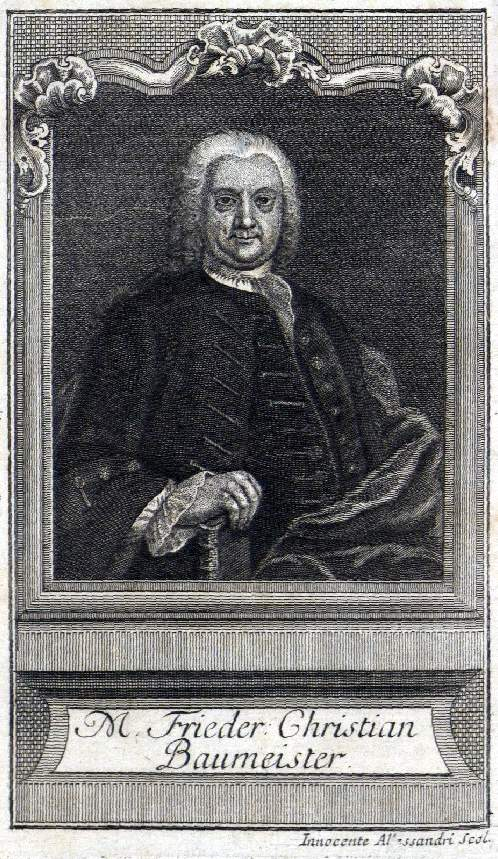
Friedrich Christian Baumeister.

Friedrich Christian Baumeister (17 July 1709 – 8 October 1785) was a German philosopher.

Baumeister studied philosophy in Jena and Wittenberg. He became director of the Görlitz gymnasium in 1736. His textbooks propagated the metaphysics of Christian Wolff.

== Works ==
- Philosophia definitiva, 1735. 1767 edition available online
- Institutiones philosophiae rationalis : methodo Wolfii conscriptae, 1735
- Institutiones metaphysicae : ontologiam, cosmologiam, psychologiam, theologiam denique naturalem complexae, 1738 and 1751
- Historia doctrinae de mundo optimo, 1741
- Elementa philosophiae recentioris : usibus iuventutis scholasticae accommodata, 1747
