= Eleanor Glanville =

English entomologist (1654–1709)

- Born: Eleanor Goodricke; 1654
- Died: 1709 (aged 54–55); Tickenham, England
- Known for: Discovery of the Glanville fritillary, contributions to early British insect catalogues
- Spouses: Edmund Ashfield (m. 1676; died 1679) Richard Glanville (m. 1685; sep. 1698)
- Children: 7
- Scientific career
- Fields: Entomology, lepidopterology

Eleanor Glanville (Note: While Glanville was sometimes referred to as "Lady Glanville" in writings by her contemporaries, this was simply a term of respect and not a formal title.) (born Goodricke; first married name Ashfield; 1654–1709) was an English entomologist and naturalist, specialising in the study of butterflies and moths. She inherited family properties across Somersetshire and married twice (once widowed). She had seven children, four of whom survived to adulthood.

After separating from her second husband in the late 1690s, Glanville returned to an early passion for butterfly collecting and established herself among the ranks of early insect enthusiasts, corresponding with other entomologists such as James Petiver and John Ray. Glanville sent multiple first-known butterfly specimens to Petiver, contributing to his British insect catalogue Gazophylacium naturae et artis, and her experiments in raising butterflies resulted in some of the earliest detailed descriptions of butterfly rearing. She is known for discovering the Glanville fritillary, the only native British butterfly named after a British naturalist. Three of Glanville's insect specimens still exist today in the Natural History Museum's Sloane collection.

Towards the end of Glanville's life, her estranged husband made attempts to obtain her wealth through intimidation and the circulation of rumours, and she countered this by leaving her properties in trust and willing small legacies to her children. Her eldest son contested the will after her death, however, and argued that his mother's entomological pursuits and seemingly eccentric behaviour were enough to declare her will invalid on grounds of insanity. The will was overturned in 1712.

== Early life and family ==
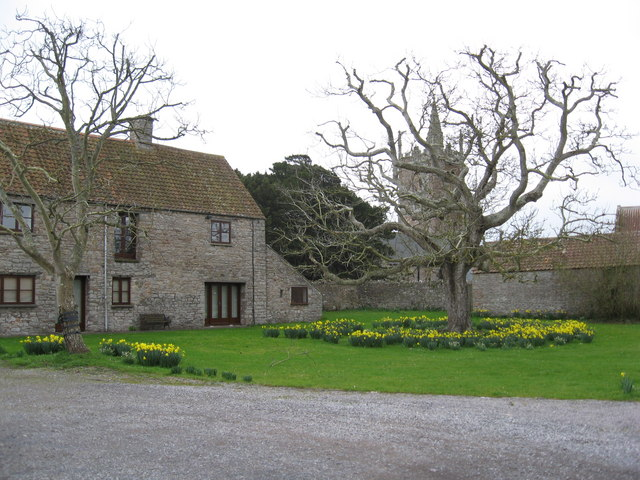
Tickenham Court in Tickenham, Somerset

Eleanor Goodricke was born in 1654 to Major William Goodricke and Eleanor Poynz (née Davis). Their second child, a younger daughter, was named Mary. William had fought in Scotland in support of Oliver Cromwell's army in 1650–1651, and was later granted a royal pardon for his actions in the Restoration of 1660. Eleanor Poynz had inherited several properties from her parents, including manors at Tickenham and Backwell Park and other properties in Somersetshire, and William was her second husband. The Goodricke family lived at Tickenham Court.

Upon her father's death in 1666 (her mother had died nine years prior), Eleanor Goodricke inherited her mother's family estates. She continued residing at Tickenham Court. In 1676, she married a Lincolnshire artist named Edmund Ashfield, and they had a son named Forest Edmund, followed by two twin daughters (only one of whom, Mary, survived birth). Ashfield died in 1679.

In 1685, Eleanor married Richard Glanville, who owned properties in Elmsett, Somersham and Offton. They had four more children, two of whom died while still in infancy. A son and daughter survived. Richard turned out to be violent, once threatening Eleanor with a loaded pistol, and by 1698 the couple had separated.

== Entomology work ==
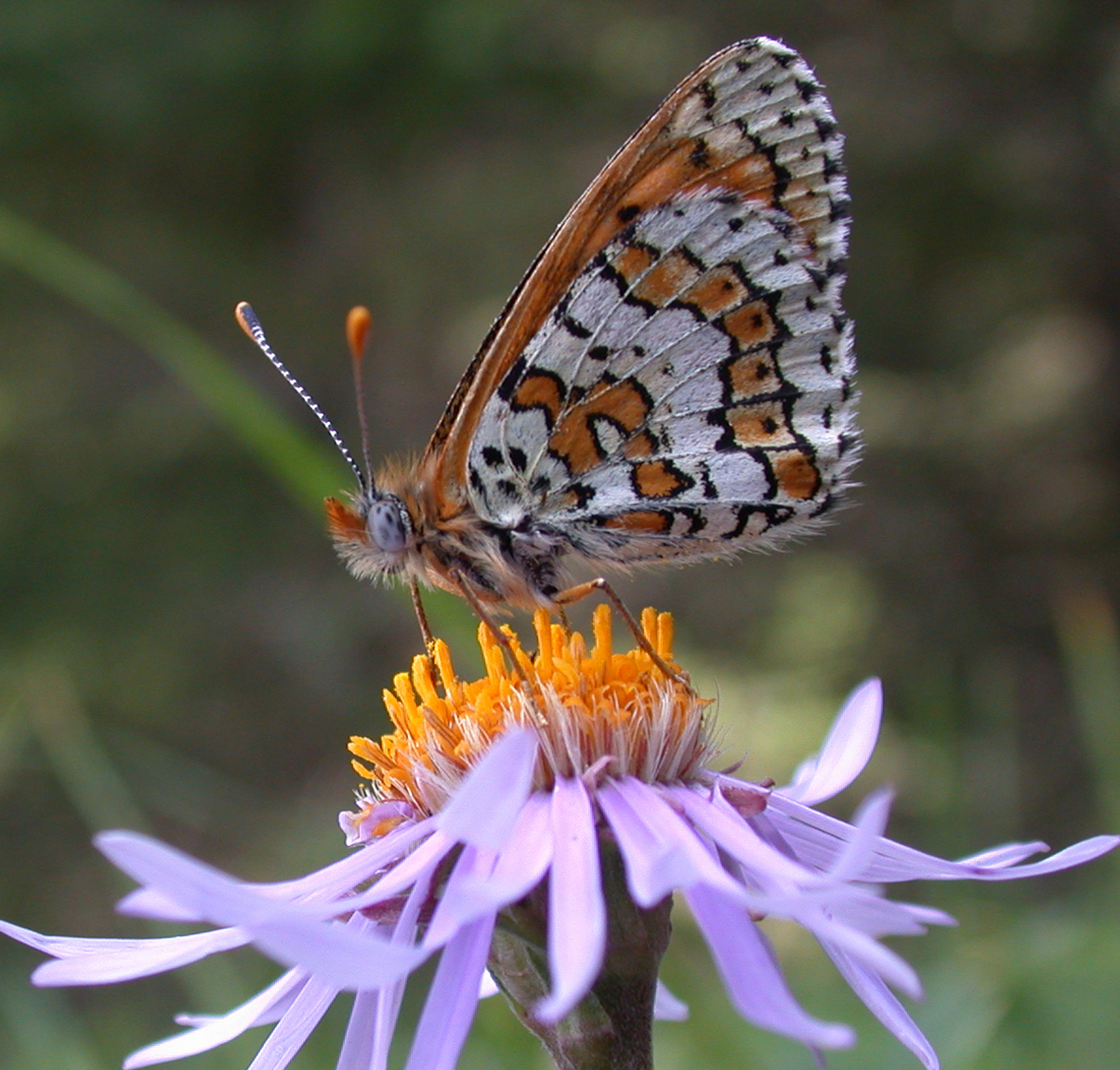
Glanville fritillary

Eleanor Glanville had been interested in butterfly collecting as a youth, but she began developing a more serious pursuit of this after her marriage with Richard broke down. She recruited her servants' help in collecting insects, paying well for specimens as long as they were carefully preserved according to instruction and delivered in excellent condition. She corresponded with other early insect collectors such as John Ray, Adam Buddle, Joseph Dandridge and William Vernon, and became close friends with entomologist James Petiver. On meeting Glanville in London in 1703, Vernon was impressed by her collection and praised it as "the noblest collection of butterflies, all English, which has sham'd us."

Over the years, Glanville sent Petiver boxes of carefully-pinned specimens, collecting lesser-known insects from across England and Wales for Petiver to catalogue and share with the entomological community. One of her boxes included the earliest known specimen of the green hairstreak butterfly. Her work helped Petiver complete his British insect catalogue Gazophylacium naturae et artis, and he credited her in the text. One of the first local lists of British insects, compiled on the insects of Bristol, is attributed to Glanville.

Glanville also reared her own moths and butterflies at home. She obtained larvae with the help of apprentice girls, going outdoors to beat hedges and bushes and catch the falling insects with a sheet. She raised high brown fritillary and green-veined white butterflies, and her description of their early lifecycle stages remains one of the earliest detailed references to the practice of rearing butterflies.

In 1702, Glanville caught a new butterfly species in Lincolnshire. The species was initially called the Lincolnshire fritillary when first illustrated and presented in Petiver's Gazophylacium. It would later be renamed the Glanville fritillary in the decades after Glanville's death, and her illustrated discovery would become Carl Linnaeus's type specimen when he described the butterfly species in 1758. It is the only native British butterfly named after a British naturalist.

== Death and legacy ==
Glanville continued to have problems with Richard after their separation, as he sought a way to take her wealth and assets for himself and his new mistress. Richard began spreading rumours that Glanville had lost her sanity, attempting to force her children to support his claims through written affidavits and even organizing plans to kidnap one of Glanville's sons to force him to sign over his inheritance. To thwart Richard's plotting, Glanville placed her properties in the hands of trustees and willed the bulk of her wealth to her second cousin, Henry Goodricke, with smaller inheritances left to her four children. She died at Tickenham in the early months of 1709, with properties and assets valued at up to £7000 (equivalent to £1,081,837 in 2025).

Unhappy with the will, Glanville's eldest son, Forest,contested the document in court after her death. He argued that his mother had been insane when she made the will, persuaded to bequeath her wealth to Henry Goodricke through the deluded belief that her children had been changed into fairies. Witnesses testified that Glanville had displayed strange behaviour such as beating bushes for insect larvae, dressing "like a gypsy " and going outdoors without all the clothing considered proper for a lady, and in 1712 her will was overturned for reasons of perceived insanity, leaving Forest to become owner of Tickenham Court.

Although Glanville struggled to preserve her own insect collections in the face of persistent mites and mould during her lifetime, three of her specimens – two moths and a butterfly, originally given to Petiver – still exist today in the Natural History Museum's Sloane collection. Two of her letters to Petiver were rediscovered in the museum's archives during the 1960s.

At the University of Lincoln the Eleanor Glanville Centre operates as a central department for diversity and inclusion work across campus. Fiona Mountain's historical romance Lady of the Butterflies (2010) centres around a fictional retelling of Glanville's life story. A new play titled Butterfly, written by Claire Jackson and due to be staged at Hampshire's Phoenix Theatre in June 2026, reimagines Glanville's life story as it might have looked in modern times.

== See also ==
- List of butterflies of Great Britain
- List of entomologists
- List of female scientists before the 20th century
- Timeline of women in science
