= Christopher Marshall (revolutionary) =

Leader in the American Revolution

Christopher Marshall (November 6, 1709 – May 4, 1797) was a leader in the American Revolution.

== Biography ==
Born in Dublin, Ireland, he went to the Thirteen Colonies in 1727, settled in Philadelphia and worked as a chemist and pharmacist. Marshall is best known for The Remembrancer, a diary he kept during the Revolution, which was not published until 1839 (edited by William J. Duane) as Extracts from the Diary of Christopher Marshall, 1774-1781.

He died in Philadelphia.

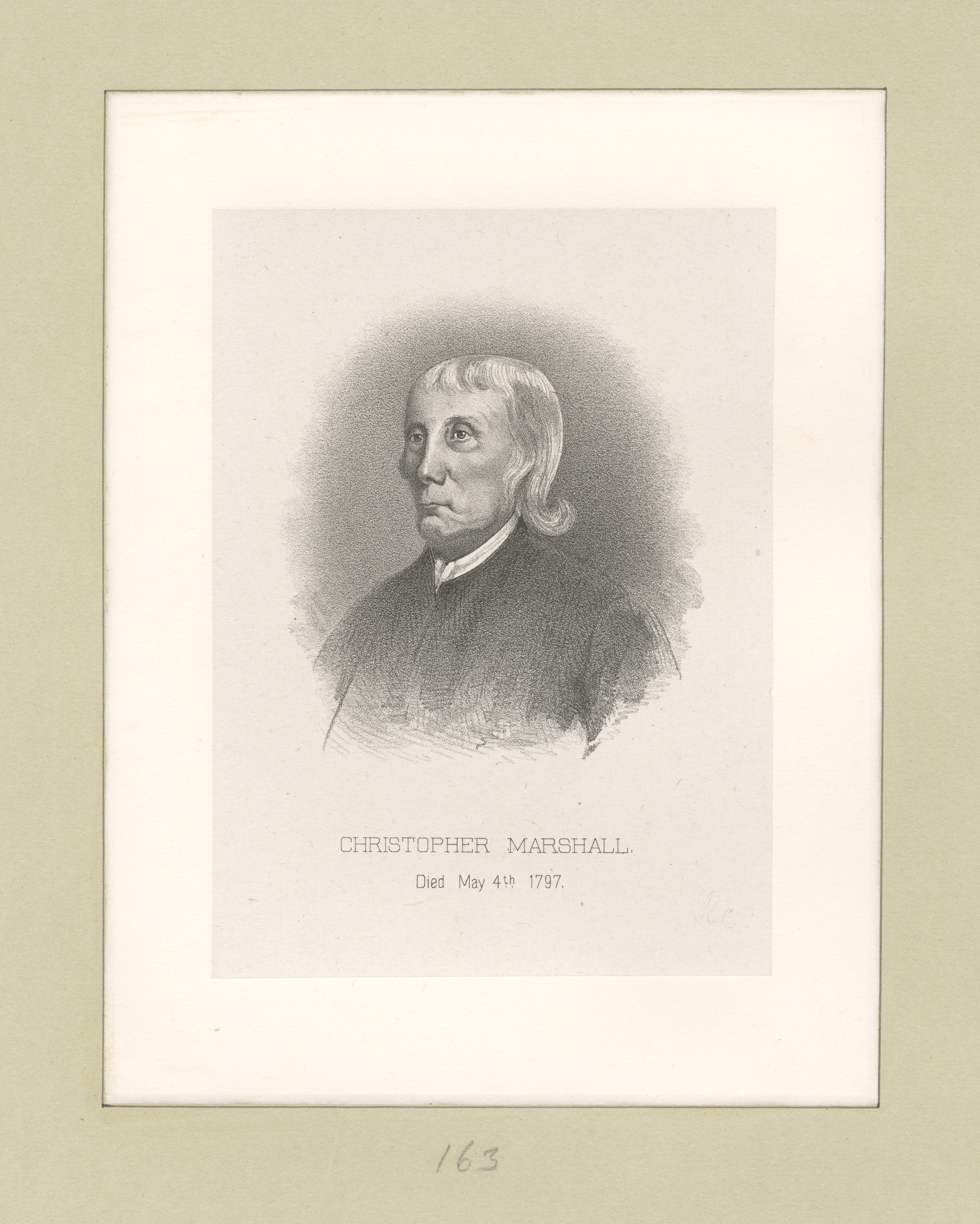
Christopher Marshall
