= Ignatius von Weitenauer =

German Jesuit writer, exegete and Orientalist

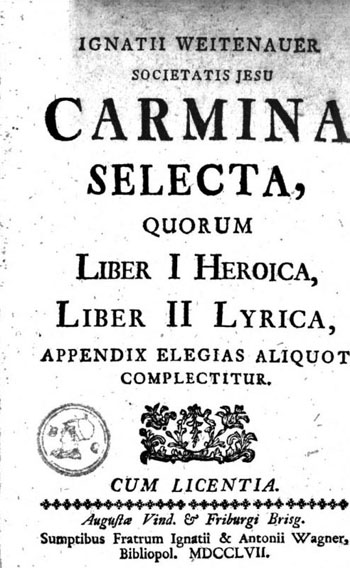
Carmina Selecta, 1757

Ignatius von Weitenauer (November 1, 1709 – February 4, 1783) was a German Jesuit writer, exegete, and Orientalist.

== Life ==
Weitenauer was born at Ingolstadt, Bavaria. His family had been knighted by the Elector of Bavaria, Maximilian Joseph. After the ordinary studies of the Society of Jesus (Jesuits), which he entered November 3, 1724, he taught for eleven years poetry and rhetoric in several colleges, mainly at Eichstätt. In 1753 he was called to the chair of philosophy and Semitic languages at the University of Innsbruck. When his career as professor was abruptly brought to an end by the suppression of the Jesuits in 1773, he followed an invitation of the abbot of the Cistercians of Salem Abbey to continue his literary activity in the monastery. He died at Salem near Constance in Württemberg, at the age of 73.

== Works ==
Prior to his call to Innsbruck, Weitenauer published several occasional works, festive odes and plays, of high merit. It was, however, during his professorship at Innsbruck that he composed his numerous learned works, the principal of which are:

- Biblia sacra ("Holy Bible", Augsburg, 1773): a commentary based on a comparison of the Vulgate with the original text
- Lexicon biblicum ("Biblical Lexicon", Augsburg, 1758, 1780), an explanation of difficult Hebrew and Greek phrases occurring in the Vulgate, republished frequently, even as late as 1866
- Hierolexicon linguarum orientalium, 1 ("Sacred Lexicon of Oriental Languages"), together with a grammar "Trifolium hebraicum, chaldaicum et syriacum" ("Hebrew, Chaldaic (Aramaic), and Syriac Trefoil", Augsburg, 1759)
- Modus addiscendi. . .linguas gallicam, italicam, hispanicam, graecam, hebraicam et chaldaicam ("Method of Learning the French, Italian, Spanish, Greek, Hebrew, and Chaldaic Languages", Frankfurt on Main, 1756), which he supplemented in 1762 by the Hexaglotton alterum docens linguas anglicam, germanicam, belgicam, latinam, lusitanicam et syriacam ("Another Six-Language [Grammar] for Instruction in English, German, Belgian (Dutch), Latin, Lusitanian (Portuguese), and Syriac"), both of them appearing under the title "Hexaglotton geminum" ("Twin Six-Language [Grammar]")

His extensive linguistic studies bore direct relation to the study of Scripture. Besides he published "Subsidia eloquentiae sacrae" ("Support of Sacred Eloquence", 19 vols., Augsburg, 1764–69). After the suppression of his order appeared "Apparatus catecheticus" ("Catechetic Apparatus", Augsburg, 1775), a collection of 1500 examples, illustrative of the teachings of Christianity. His last great work was a German translation in 12 volumes of both the Old and the New Testament with numerous annotations.
