= Mihály Salbeck =

Salbeck Mihály (May 9, 1709 in Petris Iaşi Moldavia, (today Romania) – February 25, 1758 in Gyulafehérvár, Transylvania (today Alba Iulia Romania)) was a doctor of philosophy, priest of the Society of Jesus, teacher, brother of Ferenc Salbeck and Károly Salbeck.

== Life ==
He was the son of Máté Salbeck salt trader. He got a membership at the Society of Jesus in 1726 and taught human, real and theological studies in Kolozsvár and Gyulafehérvár (Cluj Napoca and Alba Iulia respectively.

== Works ==
- Septi-collis Dacia in octavo colle beata, gesti Haller de Hallerkő devoto. Honoribus... Neo-baccalaureorum... 1735. Claudiopoli.
- Príma quinque Saecula Regni Mariani Apostolici ethice adumbrata... Claudiopoli, 1746.
- Vera apostolicorum virorum idea. Dicata honoribus spectabilium... dominorum dum in... S. J. academia Claudiopolitana suprema aa. ll. & philosophiae laurea insignirentur... anno 1746. Claudiopoli.

== Sources ==
- Szinnyei, József (2000), Magyar írók élete és munkái [Life and Works of Hungarian Writers] (in Hungarian), Budapest: Arcanum, ISBN 978-9638602992
