= Hermann Anton Gelinek =

German monk and musician

Hermann Anton Gelinek (August 8, 1709 – December 5, 1779) was a German monk and musician.

== Biography ==
Gelinek was born in Horzeniowes, Bohemia, and became a priest at the Premonstratensian Abbey in Seelau in 1728, then traveled to Vienna to study law. Returning to his monastery, he was professor and director of church music, and played the organ and violin. Soon however he developed the urge to travel and left his monastery.

He first went to Paris, where he played to audiences including the King. He later went to Naples, where he lived for a number of years and played violin under the assumed name Cervetti. He returned sometime thereafter to the monastery in Seelau, where at one point he traveled with his superiors to Prague. After returning to Seelau, he developed the urge to travel once more, and left the monastery for a final time in 1779 to go to Italy again, where he died in Milan in December 1779.

He published some concertos and sonatas for violin, some organ pieces, and various pieces of church music.

== Bibliography ==
- "Gelinek, Hermann Anton". Allgemeine Deutsche Biographie (in German). Vol. 8. 1878. p. 543.
- Theodore Baker and Alfred Remy, ed. (1919). "Gelinek, Hermann Anton". Baker's Biographical Dictionary of Musicians (3rd ed.). p. 302.
