= 1643 =

1643 in various calendars
| Gregorian calendar | 1643; MDCXLIII |
| Ab urbe condita | 2396 |
| Armenian calendar | 1092; ԹՎ ՌՂԲ |
| Assyrian calendar | 6393 |
| Balinese saka calendar | 1564–1565 |
| Bengali calendar | 1049–1050 |
| Berber calendar | 2593 |
| English Regnal year | 18 Cha. 1 – 19 Cha. 1 |
| Buddhist calendar | 2187 |
| Burmese calendar | 1005 |
| Byzantine calendar | 7151–7152 |
| Chinese calendar | 壬午年 (Water Horse); 4340 or 4133 — to — 癸未年 (Water Goat); 4341 or 4134 |
| Coptic calendar | 1359–1360 |
| Discordian calendar | 2809 |
| Ethiopian calendar | 1635–1636 |
| Hebrew calendar | 5403–5404 |
- Hindu calendars
| Vikram Samvat | 1699–1700 |
| Shaka Samvat | 1564–1565 |
| Kali Yuga | 4743–4744 |
| Holocene calendar | 11643 |
| Igbo calendar | 643–644 |
| Iranian calendar | 1021–1022 |
| Islamic calendar | 1052–1053 |
| Japanese calendar | Kan'ei 20 (寛永２０年) |
| Javanese calendar | 1564–1565 |
| Julian calendar | Gregorian minus 10 days |
| Korean calendar | 3976 |
| Minguo calendar | 269 before ROC 民前269年 |
| Nanakshahi calendar | 175 |
| Thai solar calendar | 2185–2186 |
| Tibetan calendar | ཆུ་ཕོ་རྟ་ལོ་ (male Water-Horse); 1769 or 1388 or 616 — to — ཆུ་མོ་ལུག་ལོ་ (female Water-Sheep); 1770 or 1389 or 617 |

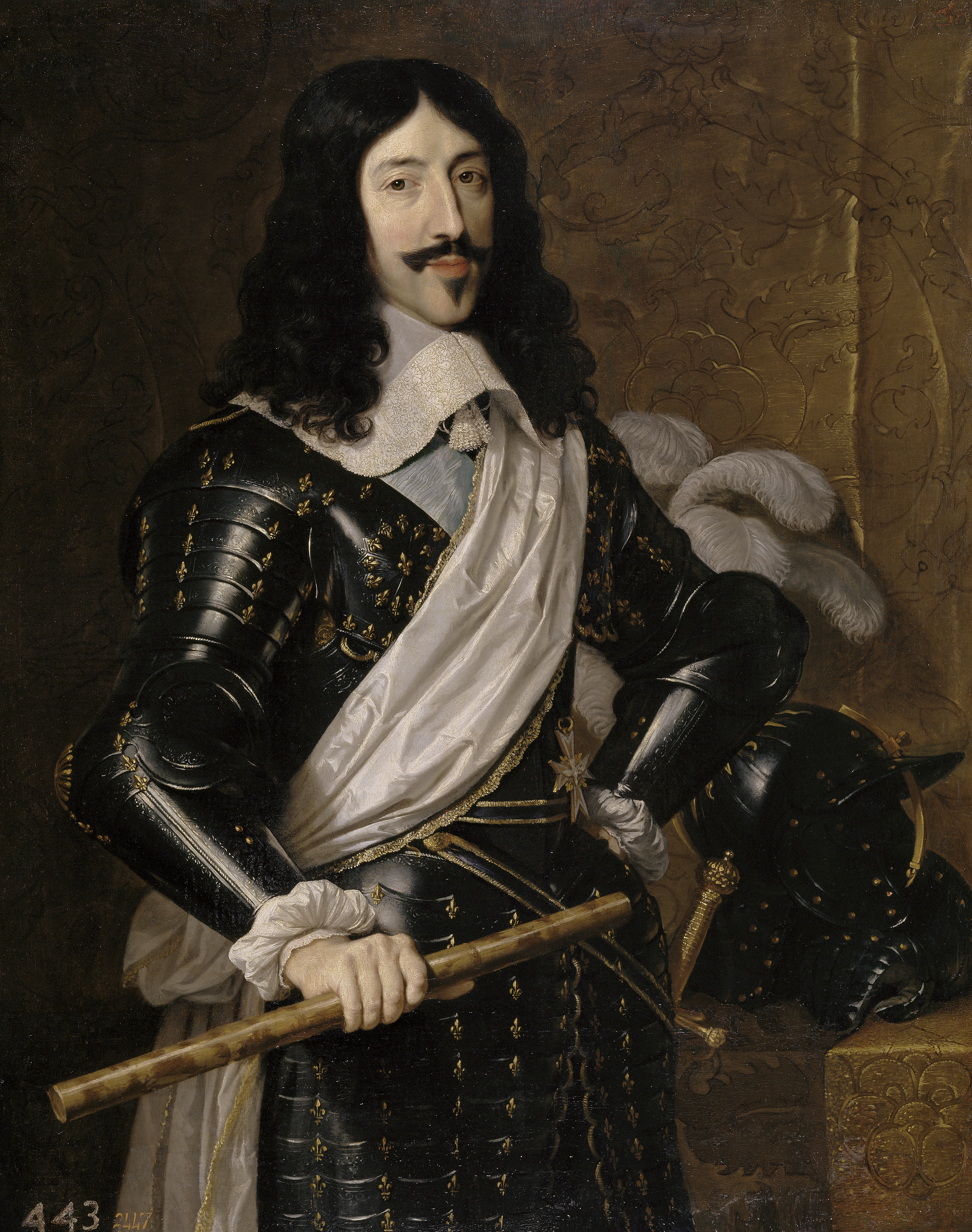
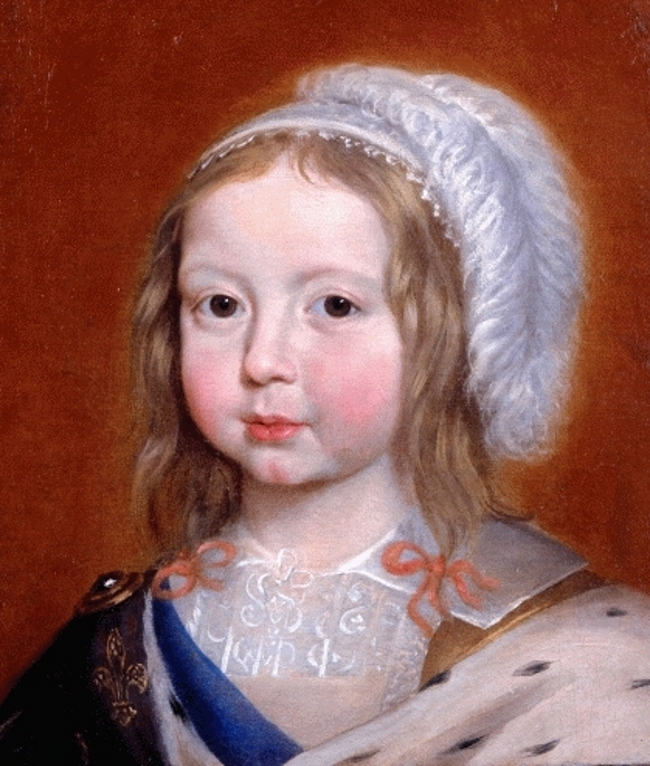
May 14: King Louis XIII of France dies at age 41, and his 4-year-old son becomes King Louis XIV.

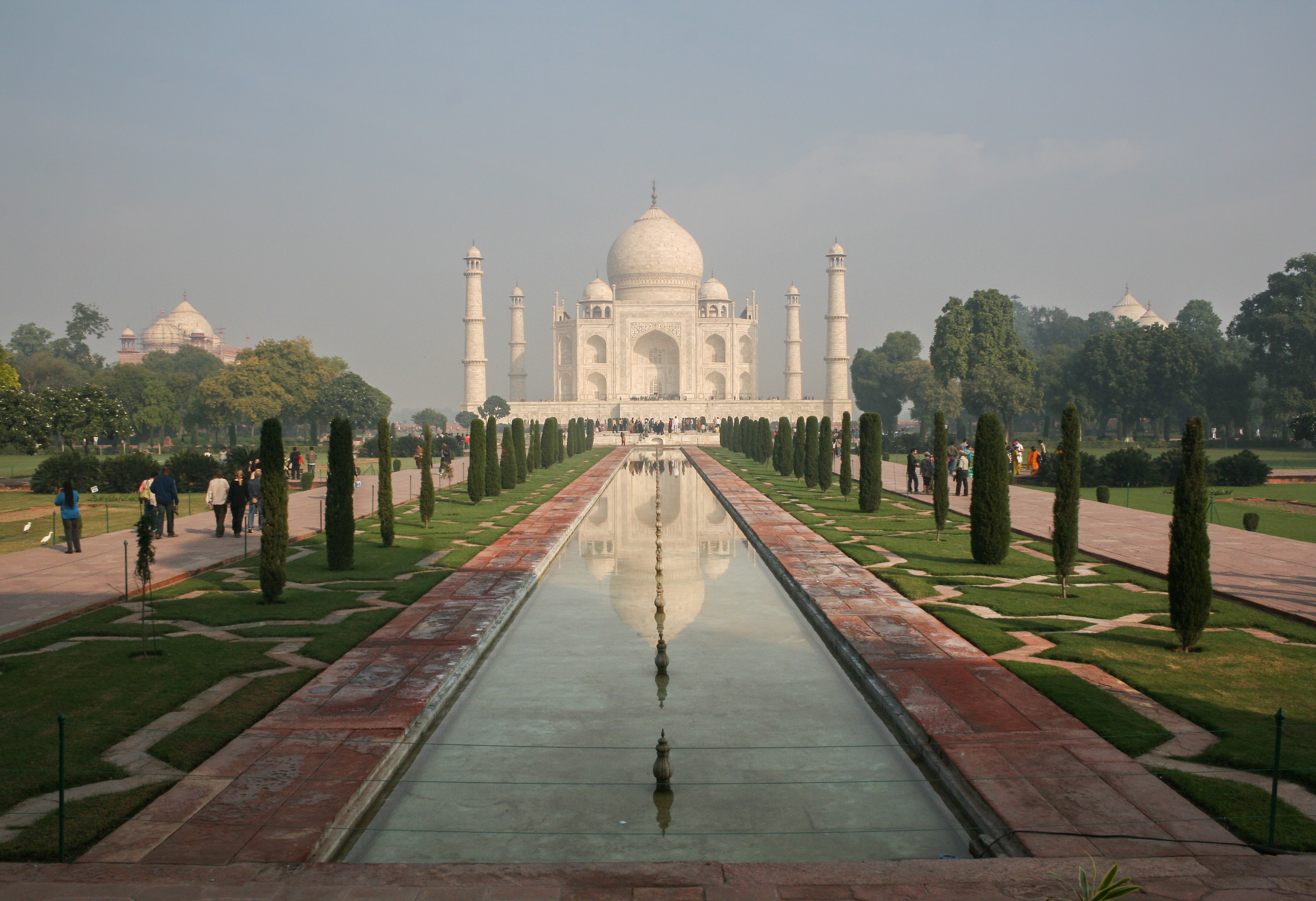
February 6: The Taj Mahal (pictured in 2009) is opened to the public.

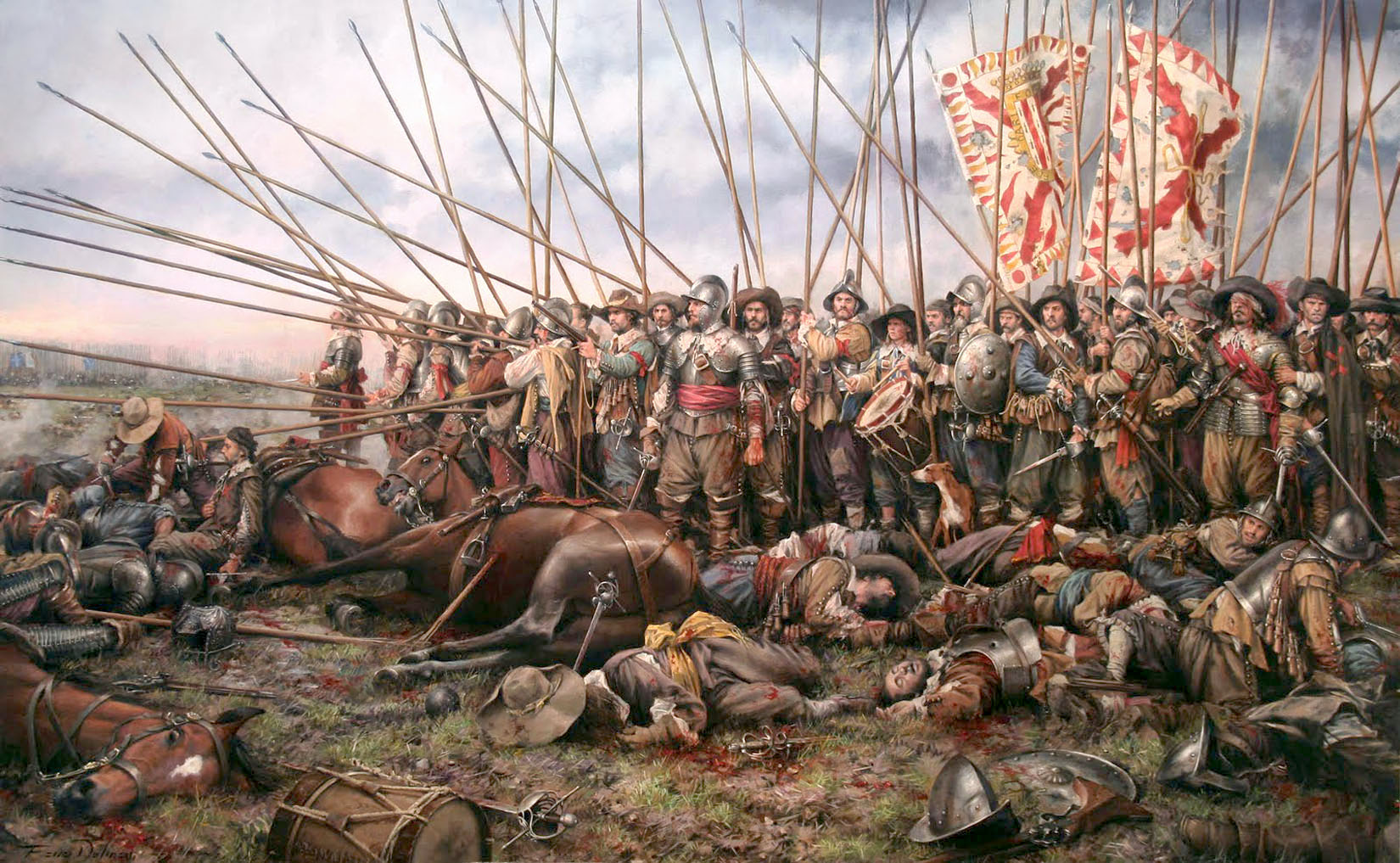
May 19: Battle of Rocroi

1643 (MDCXLIII) was a common year starting on Thursday of the Gregorian calendar and a common year starting on Sunday of the Julian calendar, the 1643rd year of the Common Era (CE) and Anno Domini (AD) designations, the 643rd year of the 2nd millennium, the 43rd year of the 17th century, and the 4th year of the 1640s decade. As of the start of 1643, the Gregorian calendar was 10 days ahead of the Julian calendar, which remained in localized use until 1923.

== Events ==
=== January–March ===
- January 21 – Abel Tasman sights the island of Tonga.
- February 6
  - (17 Dhu al-Qadah 1052 AH) In India, the first ceremony at the nearly-complete Taj Mahal in Agra, the Mughal Emperor Shah Jahan observes the 12th anniversary of the death of his wife, Mumtaz Mahal, and opens the structure to thousands of mourners.
  - Abel Tasman sights the Fiji Islands.
- March 13 – First English Civil War: First Battle of Middlewich – Roundheads (Parliamentarians) rout the Cavaliers (Royalist supporters of King Charles I) at Middlewich in Cheshire.
- March 18 – Irish Confederate Wars: Battle of New Ross – English troops defeat those of Confederate Ireland.

=== April–June ===
- April 1 – Åmål, Sweden, is granted its city charter.
- April 28 – Francisco de Lucena, former Portuguese Secretary of State, is beheaded after being convicted of treason.
- May 14 – Louis XIV succeeds his father Louis XIII as King of France at age 4. His rule will last until his death at age 76 in 1715, a total of 72 years, which will be the longest reign of any European monarch in recorded history.
- May 19
  - Thirty Years' War: Battle of Rocroi: The French defeat the Spanish at Rocroi in France.
  - The New England Confederation is formed as a military alliance between Massachusetts Bay Colony, Plymouth Colony, Saybrook Colony (Connecticut), and New Haven Colony.
- May 20 – Dutch expedition to Valdivia: The Dutch fleet (led by Hendrik Brouwer) is spotted off Carelmapu in Chile, soon afterwards landing nearby and plundering the fort and village.
- June 30 – First English Civil War: Battle of Adwalton Moor – Royalists gain control of Yorkshire.

=== July–September ===
- July 1 – The Westminster Assembly of theologians ("divines") and parliamentarians is convened at Westminster Abbey with the aim of restructuring the Church of England.
- July 5 – First English Civil War: Battle of Lansdowne – Royalists gain a pyrrhic victory over the Parliamentarians near Bath, Somerset.
- July 13 – First English Civil War: Battle of Roundway Down – Henry Wilmot, newly created Baron Wilmot, commanding Royalist cavalry, wins a crushing victory over Parliamentarian Sir William Waller.
- August 24 – Dutch expedition to Valdivia: A Dutch fleet establishes a new colony in the ruins of Valdivia in southern Chile.
- September 6 – Battle of Mongiovino: The forces of the Grand Duchy of Tuscany, led by Mattias de' Medici, defeated the Papal forces commanded by Taddeo Barberini.
- September 20 – First English Civil War: First Battle of Newbury – A strategic Parliamentarian victory is made over Royalist forces who are led personally by King Charles.

=== October–December ===
- October 8 – The Shunzhi Emperor of China is crowned at five years old, 17 days after the death of his father and the decision of the Deliberative Council of Princes and Ministers.
- October 28 – Dutch expedition to Valdivia: The Dutch end their occupation of Valdivia in Chile.
- November 14 – Empress Meishō abdicates and Emperor Go-Kōmyō accedes to the throne of Japan.
- November 24 – Thirty Years' War: Battle of Tuttlingen – France is defeated by forces of the Holy Roman Empire.
- December 12 – Swedish Field Marshal Lennart Torstensson's forces enter Danish territory in Holstein, beginning the Torstenson War.
- December 13 – First English Civil War: At the Battle of Alton in Hampshire, the Parliamentarians defeat the Royalists.
- December 25 – Christmas Island in the Indian Ocean is sighted and named by Captain William Mynors of the British East India Company ship Royal Mary.
- December 28 – Dutch expedition to Valdivia: The failed Dutch expedition arrives back at Recife in Dutch Brazil.

=== Date unknown ===
- Baden-Baden is pillaged by the French.
- An Calbhach mac Aedh Ó Conchobhair Donn, The Ó Conchubhair Donn, Chief of the Name of the Clan Ó Conchubhair, is popularly inaugurated as the last King of Connacht in Ireland.
- Evangelista Torricelli invents the mercury barometer.
- Paul de Chomedey, Sieur de Maisonneuve, places the first Mount Royal Cross atop Mount Royal above Montreal.
- Jean Bolland publishes the first two volumes of the Acta Sanctorum (in Antwerp). This is the beginning of the Bollandists' work.
- Miyamoto Musashi begins to dictate The Book of Five Rings (Go Rin No Sho) to his student; he will complete it in 1645, just before his death.
- Roger Williams, co-founder of Rhode Island, publishes A Key into the Language of America.
- The first professional book publisher to use printing press in Norway is established in Oslo.

== Births ==
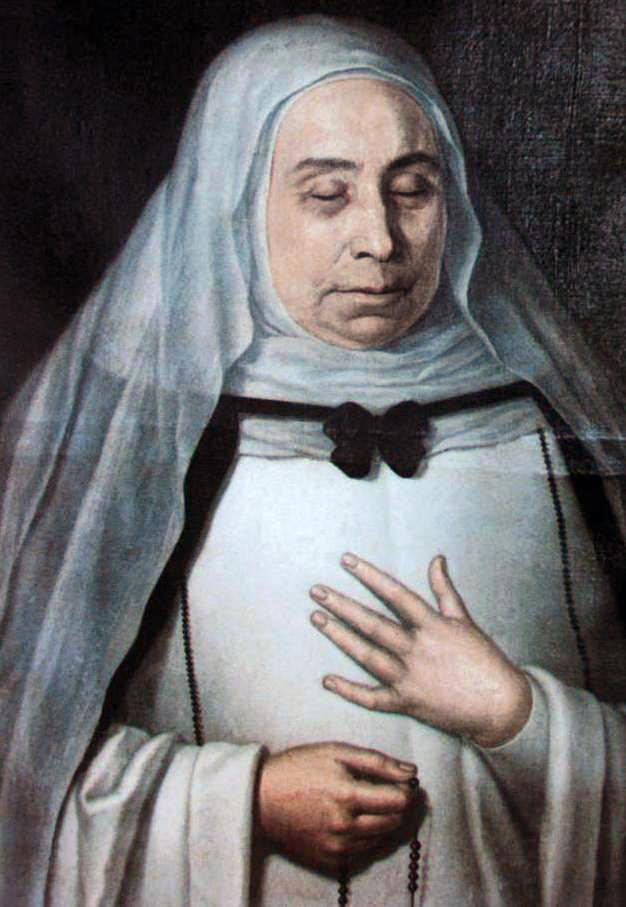
Mary of Jesus de León y Delgado

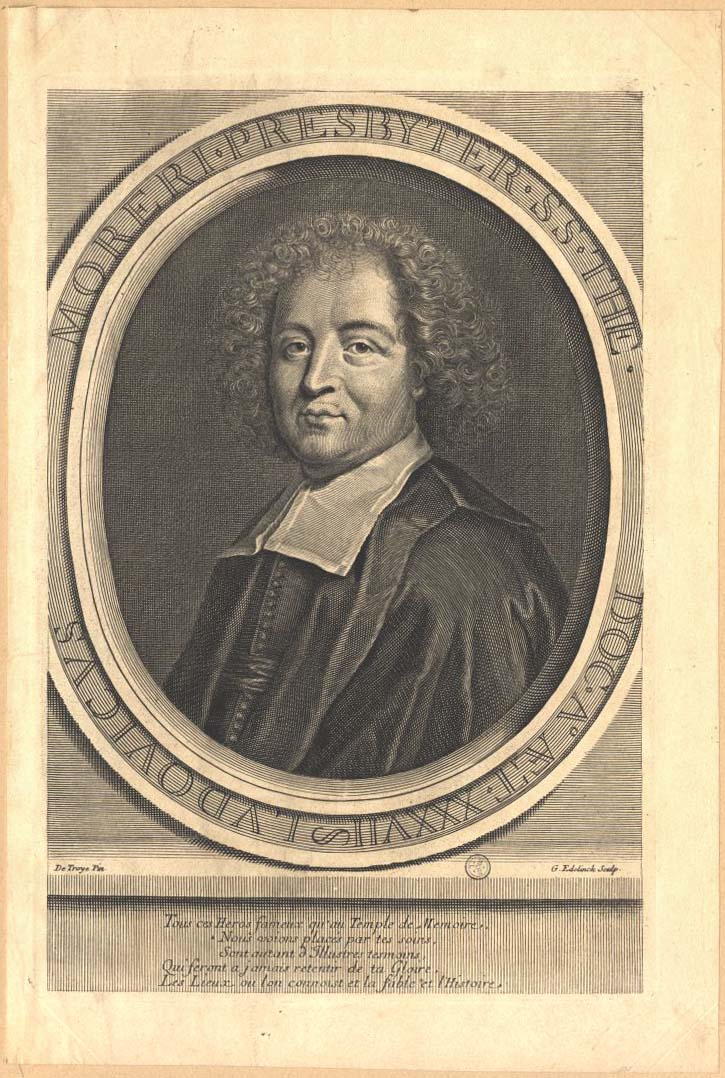
Louis Moréri

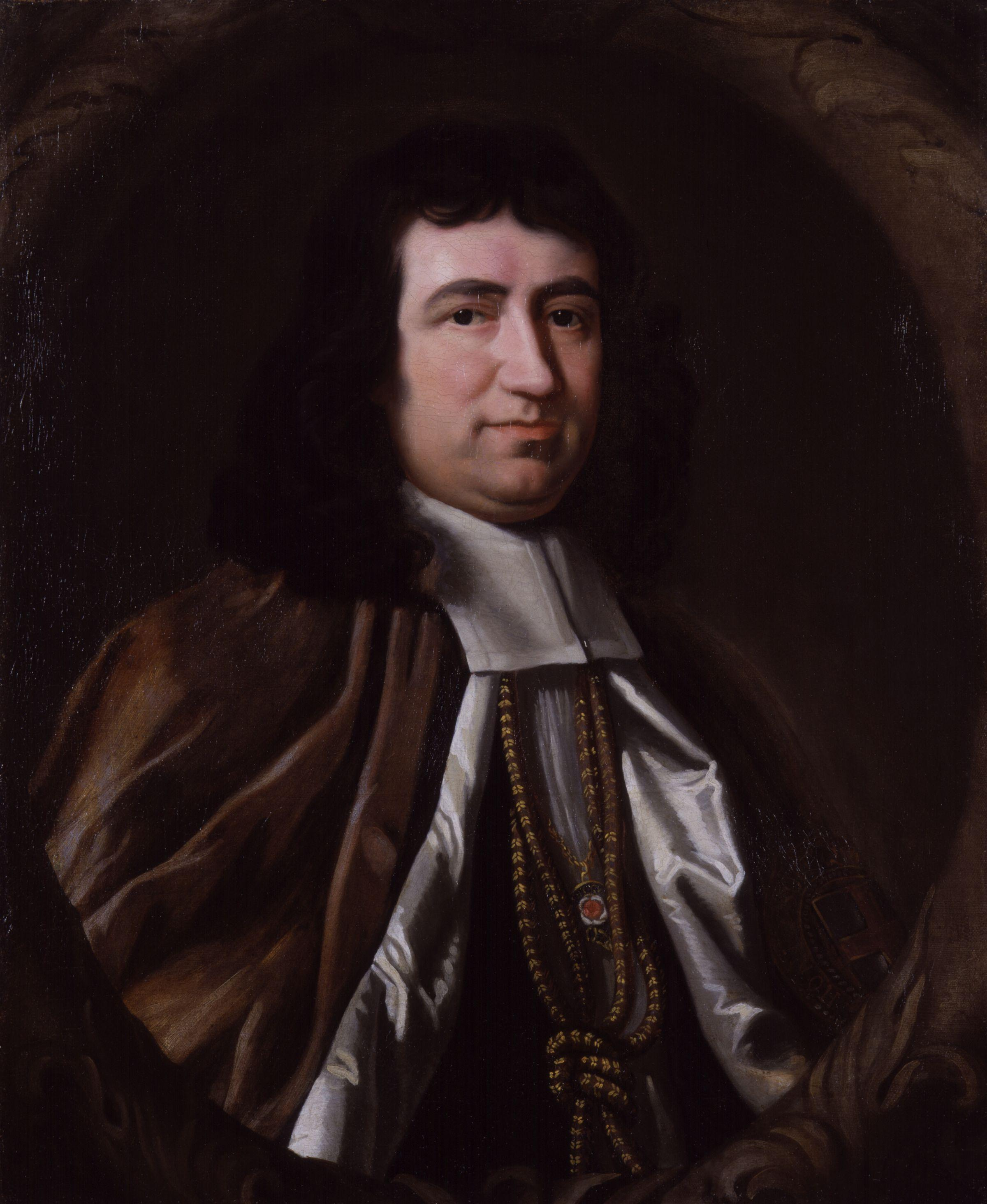
Gilbert Burnet

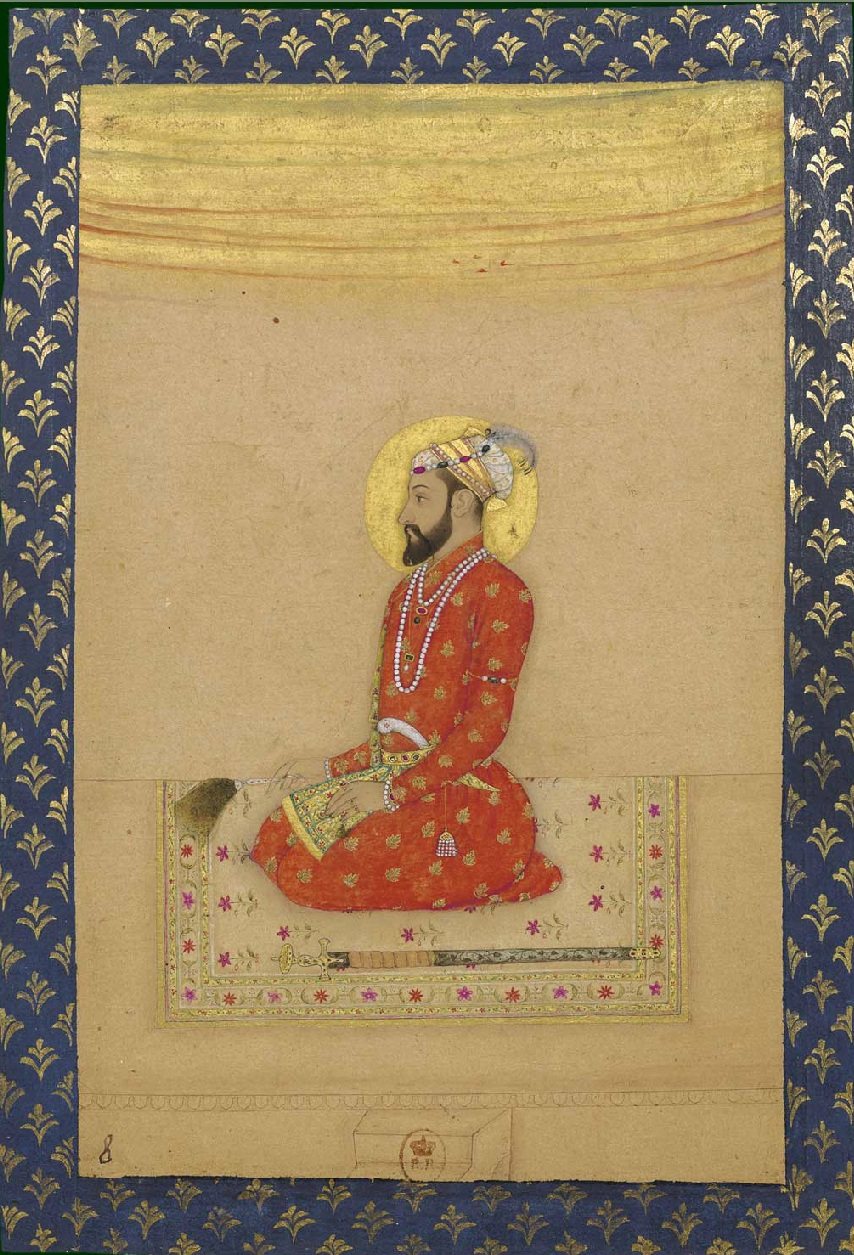
Bahadur Shah I

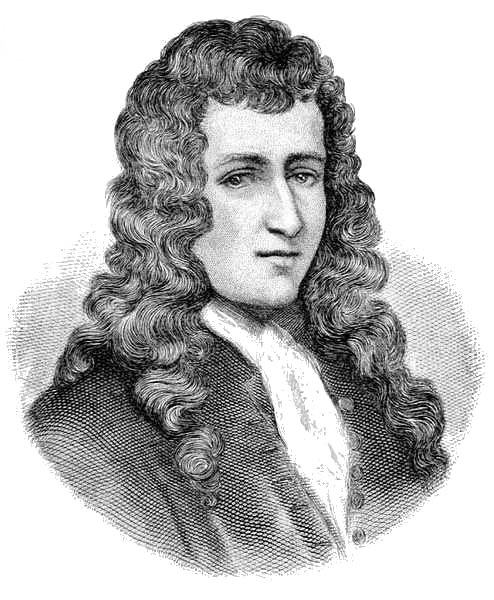
René-Robert Cavelier, Sieur de La Salle

=== January–March ===
- January 2 – Eleonora d'Este, Italian princess, later nun (d. 1722)
- January 4 (N.S.) – Sir Isaac Newton, English scientist (d. 1727)
- January 7 (O.S.) – Sir Samuel Grimston, 3rd Baronet, English politician (d. 1700)
- January 9 – Eleonoro Pacello, Italian Catholic prelate, Bishop of Pula (1689–1695) (d. 1695)
- January 13 – Axel Wachtmeister, Count of Mälsåker, Swedish field marshal (d. 1699)
- January 25 – John Hayes, English politician (d. 1705)
- January 24 – Charles Sackville, 6th Earl of Dorset, English poet and courtier (d. 1706)
- January 30 – Sir Francis Blundell, 3rd Baronet, Irish politician (d. 1707)
- February 6
  - Charles Fanshawe, 4th Viscount Fanshawe, English politician (d. 1710)
  - Johann Kasimir Kolbe von Wartenberg, Prussian politician (d. 1712)
- February 15 – García Felipe de Legazpi y Velasco Altamirano y Albornoz, Spanish Catholic prelate, Bishop of Tlaxcala (d. 1706)
- February 25
  - Sultan Ahmed II of the Ottoman Empire (d. 1695)
  - Christian Franz Paullini, German physician (d. 1712)
- March 4 – Fran Krsto Frankopan, Croatian baroque poet, nobleman and politician (d. 1671)
- March 6 – Pierre de Langle, French bishop and theologian (d. 1724)
- March 8 – Nabeshima Naoyuki, Japanese daimyō (d. 1725)
- March 17 – Fabrizio Spada, Italian Catholic cardinal (d. 1717)
- March 23 – Mary of Jesus de León y Delgado, Spanish Dominican lay sister and mystic (d. 1731)
- March 25 – Louis Moréri, French priest and encyclopaedist (d. 1680)
- March 28 – Anthony Dopping, Anglican Bishop of Meath (d. 1697)
- March 29 – Louis Phélypeaux, comte de Pontchartrain (d. 1727)

=== April–June ===
- April 3 – Charles V, Duke of Lorraine (d. 1690)
- April 6 – Nehemiah Jewett, American colonial politician (d. 1720)
- April 30 – Johann Oswald Harms, German Baroque painter (d. 1708)
- May 3 – Georg Franck von Franckenau, German botanist (d. 1704)
- May 7 – Stephanus Van Cortlandt, first native-born mayor of New York City (d. 1700)
- May 8 – George Louis I, Count of Erbach-Erbach (1672–1693) (d. 1693)
- May 9 – Charles Kirkhoven, 1st Earl of Bellomont, Dutch-born Irish peer (d. 1683)
- May 10 – Gabriel Revel, French painter (d. 1712)
- May 29 – Patrick Lyon, 3rd Earl of Strathmore and Kinghorne, Scottish peer and the son of John Lyon (d. 1695)

=== July–September ===
- July 3 – Johann Ernst von Thun, Tyrolean Catholic bishop (d. 1709)
- July 26 – Burchard de Volder, Dutch mathematician (d. 1709)
- July 28 – Antonio Tarsia, Italian composer (d. 1722)
- July 29 – Henri Jules, Prince of Condé (d. 1709)
- August 3 – Charles de la Rue, French Jesuit, Latin poet (d. 1725)
- August 16 – Mumtaz Shikoh, Mughal Empire emperor (d. 1647)
- August 18 – William Louis, Prince of Anhalt-Harzgerode (1670–1709) (d. 1709)
- August 21 – King Afonso VI of Portugal, King of Portugal and the Algarves (d. 1683)
- August 26 – Cardinal de Bouillon, French Catholic cardinal (d. 1715)
- September 3 – Lorenzo Bellini, Italian physician, anatomist (d. 1704)
- September 5 – Sir William Portman, 6th Baronet, English politician (d. 1690)
- September 6 – François-Joseph de Beaupoil de Sainte-Aulaire, French poet (d. 1742)
- September 14
  - Jeremiah Dummer, American silversmith (d. 1718)
  - Joseph de Jouvancy, French historian (d. 1719)
- September 17 – Francis Howard, 5th Baron Howard of Effingham, English peer (d. 1694)
- September 18 – Gilbert Burnet, Scottish philosopher and historian (d. 1715)
- September 27 – Solomon Stoddard, pastor of the Congregationalist Church in Northampton, Massachusetts (d. 1729)
- September 30 – Samuel Hoadly, American-born English schoolmaster, writer of educational books (d. 1705)

=== October–December ===
- October 5 – Zinat-un-Nissa, princess of the Mughal Empire (d. 1721)
- October 14 – Bahadur Shah I, Mughal Emperor of India (d. 1712)
- October 25 – Georg Ludwig Agricola, German composer (d. 1676)
- November 1 – John Strype, English historian and biographer (d. 1737)
- November 4 – Asano Nagatomo, Japanese daimyō who ruled the Akō Domain (d. 1675)
- November 16 – Jean Chardin, French jeweller, traveller (d. 1713)
- November 22 – René-Robert Cavelier, Sieur de La Salle, French explorer (d. 1687)
- November 23 – Eberhard von Danckelmann, Prussian politician (d. 1722)
- December 24 – Israel Kolmodin, Swedish hymnwriter and priest (d. 1709)
- December 28 – Salomon van Til, theologian of the Dutch Reformed Church (d. 1713)

=== Date unknown ===
- Marie Grubbe, Danish countess (d. 1718)
- Eva Krotoa, Khoi translator and interpreter (d. 1674)
- Ilona Zrínyi, Hungarian heroine (d. 1703)

== Deaths ==
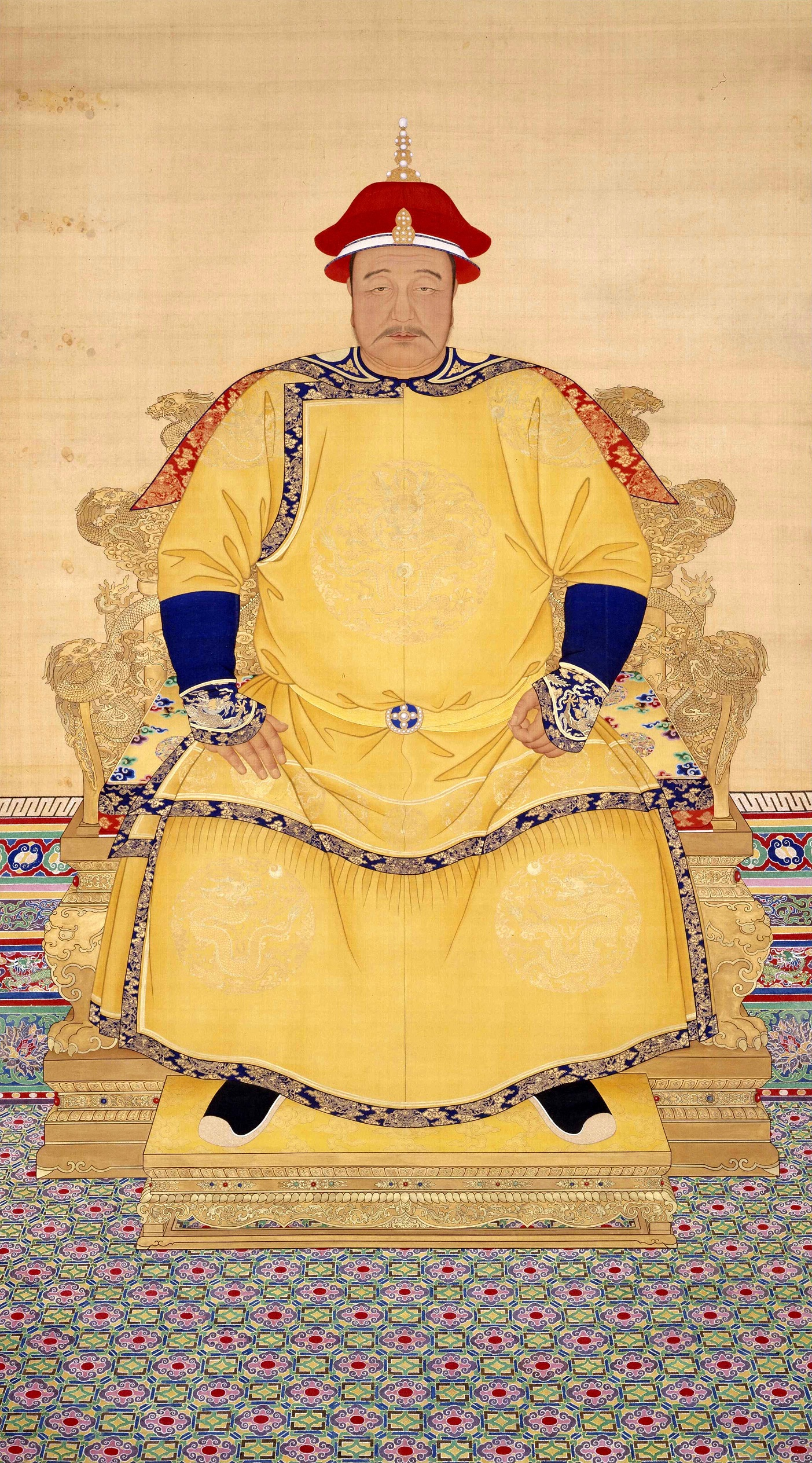
Hong Taiji

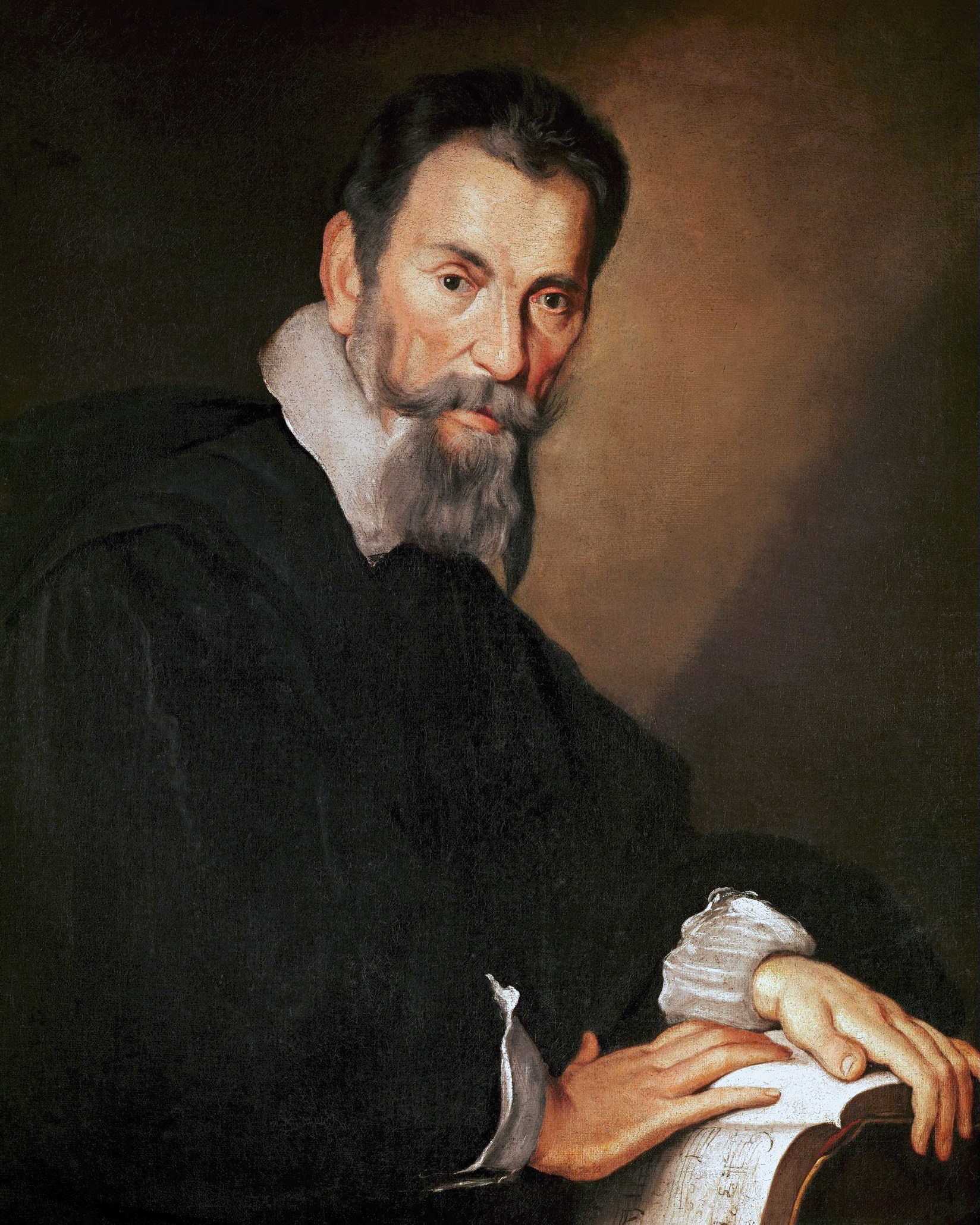
Claudio Monteverdi

- January 14 – John Bois, English scholar (b. 1560)
- January 20 – Henry Danvers, 1st Earl of Danby, English noble (b. 1573)
- February 11 – Countess Palatine Anna Maria of Neuburg, Duchess of Saxe-Altenburg (b. 1575)
- February 15 – Countess Juliane of Nassau-Siegen, Landgravine of Hesse-kassel (b. 1587)
- February 25 – Marco da Gagliano, Italian composer (b. 1582)
- March 1
  - Girolamo Frescobaldi, Italian composer (b. 1583)
  - Rustam Khan, Georgian-Iranian soldier (b. c. 1588)
- April 4 – Simon Episcopius, Dutch theologian (b. 1583)
- April 12
  - Louis I, Count of Erbach-Erbach (1606–1643) (b. 1579)
  - Nicolaus Hunnius, German theologian (b. 1585)
- April 13 – Margherita Farnese, Benedictine nun (b. 1567)
- April 20 – Christoph Demantius, German composer (b. 1567)
- April 28
  - Francisco de Lucena, Portuguese Secretary of State (b. c. 1578)
  - Philip III, Landgrave of Hesse-Butzbach (b. 1581)
- May 14 – King Louis XIII of France (b. 1601)
- July 12 – François Duquesnoy, Flemish Baroque sculptor in Rome (b. 1597)
- July 25 – Robert Pierrepont, 1st Earl of Kingston-upon-Hull, English statesman (b. 1584)
- August – Anne Hutchinson, English Puritan preacher (b. 1591)
- August 7 – Margaret of Brunswick-Lüneburg, German noble (b. 1573)
- August 22
  - Philippe de Carteret II, son of Philippe de Carteret I (1552– (b. 1584)
  - Johann Georg Wirsung, German anatomist (b. 1589)
- September 15 – Richard Boyle, 1st Earl of Cork, Irish politician (b. 1566)
- September 20, at the Battle of Newbury:
  - Lucius Cary, 2nd Viscount Falkland, English politician and writer (b. c. 1610)
  - Robert Dormer, 1st Earl of Carnarvon (b. c. 1610)
  - Henry Spencer, 1st Earl of Sunderland (b. 1620)
- September 21 – Emperor Hong Taiji of China (b. 1592)
- October 2 – Jean Chalette, French painter (b. 1581)
- October 29 – Brilliana, Lady Harley, English noble, letter writer and war heroine (b. 1598)
- November 3
  - John Bainbridge, English astronomer (b. 1583)
  - Paul Guldin, Swiss astronomer and mathematician (b. 1577)
  - Sun Chuanting, Ming dynasty general (b. 1593)
- November 14
  - Henry Hastings, 5th Earl of Huntingdon, English noble (b. 1586)
  - George Aribert of Anhalt-Dessau, German nobleman (b. 1606)
- November 15 – Tachibana Muneshige, Japanese samurai and soldier (b. 1567)
- November 17 – Jean-Baptiste Budes, Comte de Guébriant, Marshal of France (b. 1602)
- November 29
  - William Cartwright, English dramatist (b. 1611)
  - Claudio Monteverdi, Italian composer (b. 1567)
- December 8 – John Pym, English statesman (b. 1583)
- December 10 – Herman Wrangel, Swedish soldier and politician (b. 1584/1587)
- December 11
  - Arthur Bell, English Franciscan martyr (b. 1590)
  - Henry Clifford, 5th Earl of Cumberland, English politician (b. 1591)
- December 30 – Giovanni Baglione, Italian painter and historian of art (b. 1566)
- approx. date – Henry Glapthorne, English dramatist (b. 1610)
- date unknown
  - Sophia Brahe, Danish astronomer and horticulturalist (b. 1556)
  - María Pita, Spanish heroine (b. 1565)
