= Miguel de Vasconcelos =

Prime Minister of Portugal (1590–1640)

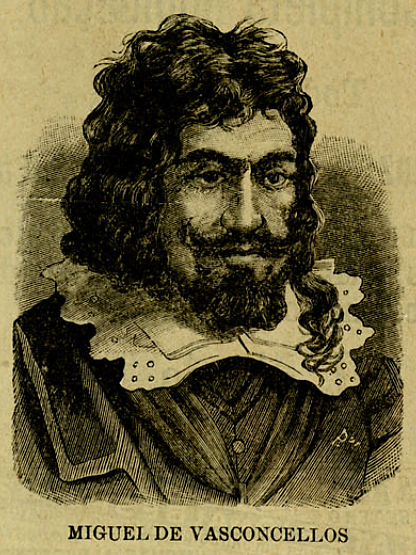

Secretary of State
- In office January 1635 – December 1640
- Monarch: Philip III of Portugal (Margaret of Savoy, Vicereine of Portugal)
- Preceded by: Filipe de Mesquita
- Succeeded by: Francisco de Lucena

Personal details
- Born: c. 1590
- Died: 1 December 1640 (aged 49–50) Lisbon, Portugal

Miguel de Vasconcelos e Brito (Portuguese pronunciation: [miˈɣɛl dɨ vaʃkõˈsɛluʃ]; c. 1590 – 1 December 1640) was a Portuguese politician who served as the Secretary of State of the Kingdom of Portugal in the final years of the Iberian Union. He was assassinated during the Portuguese revolt of 1640.

== Biography ==
His father was Pedro Barbosa de Luna, a jurist who was murdered in 1621 after he had been suspected of corruption. His mother was Antónia de Melo.

Vasconcelos was appointed Secretary of the Treasury (Secretario de Hacienda) in 1631. He then assumed the post of Secretary of State in January 1635, serving under Margaret of Savoy, Vicereine of Portugal, the Duchess of Mantua, a cousin of King Philip III. His appointment was engineered by his relative, Diogo Soares. Bolstered by the powerful Spanish minister Olivares, Vasconcelos and Soares effectively controlled the entire administration of Portugal. The Duchess was merely a figurehead, chosen specifically because a woman was considered easier to dominate.

Perceived as a traitor to his countrymen and nation, Vasconcelos was universally detested in Portugal. The Portuguese despised the excessive power exercised by him and Soares and the taxes the two imposed on behalf of the Spanish crown. In 1637, rioting broke out in Evora in response to the collection of new taxes. The Count of Linhares, a member of the Council of Portugal, blamed the riots on the tyrannical government of Vasconcelos and Soares and urged Olivares to dismiss them, arguing that it was better to discharge two unpopular ministers than run the risk of losing the kingdom. Despite his respect for Linhares, Olivares refused. The rebellion was quelled, but gave rise to heightened conspiracy amongst fidalgos.

On the morning of 1 December 1640, while Spanish royal troops were occupied with the Catalan Revolt, a group of Portuguese noblemen known as the Forty Conspirators stormed the viceregal palace in Lisbon and arrested Margaret of Savoy. Miguel de Vasconcelos attempted to hide in a cupboard but was discovered and shot to death. His body was then defenestrated and mutilated by angry crowds. John, 8th Duke of Braganza was proclaimed king of Portugal soon after, marking the end of sixty years of Habsburg Spanish rule.

== Death in art ==
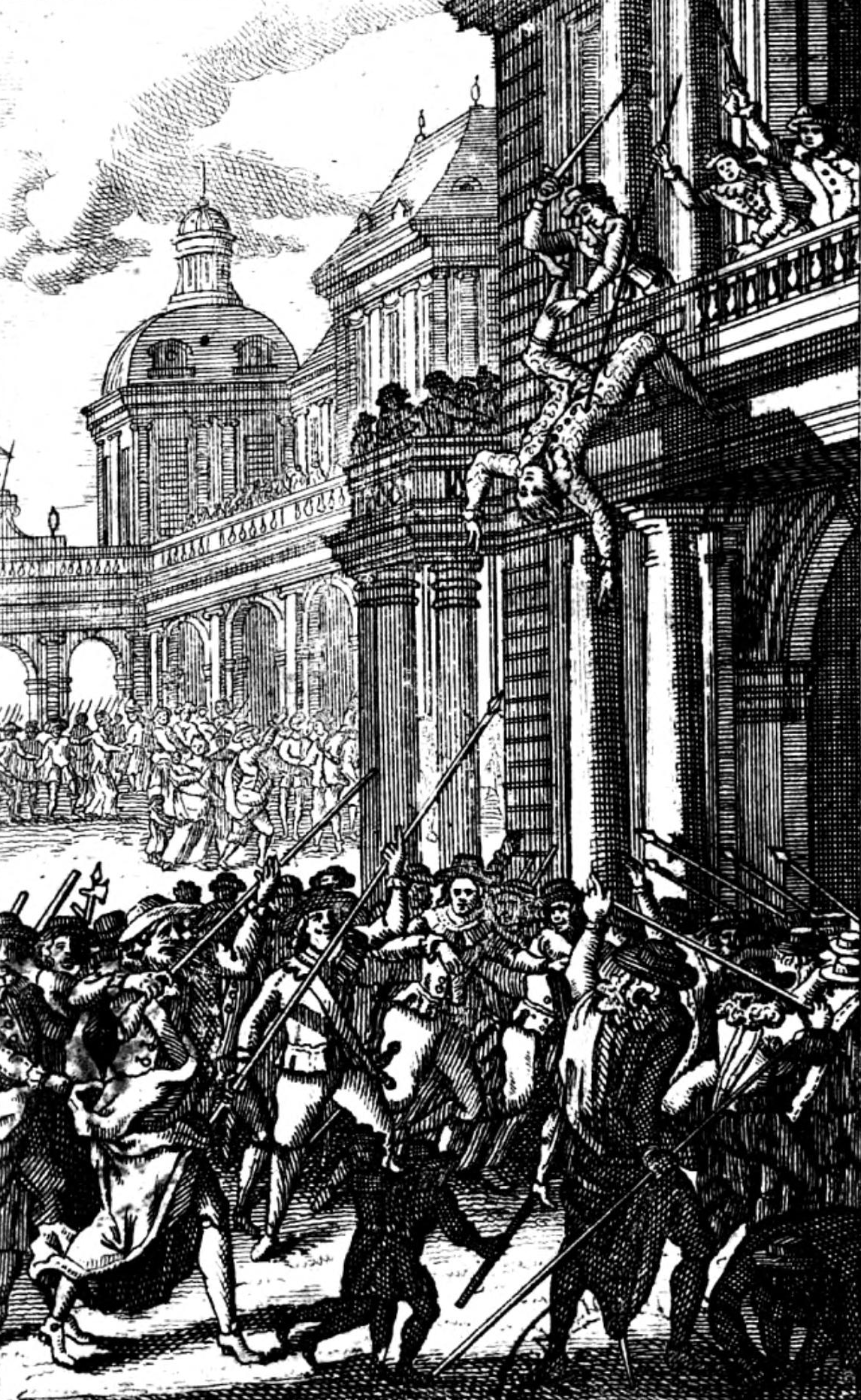
By René Aubert de Vertot, in Histoire des Révolutions de Portugal (1729)

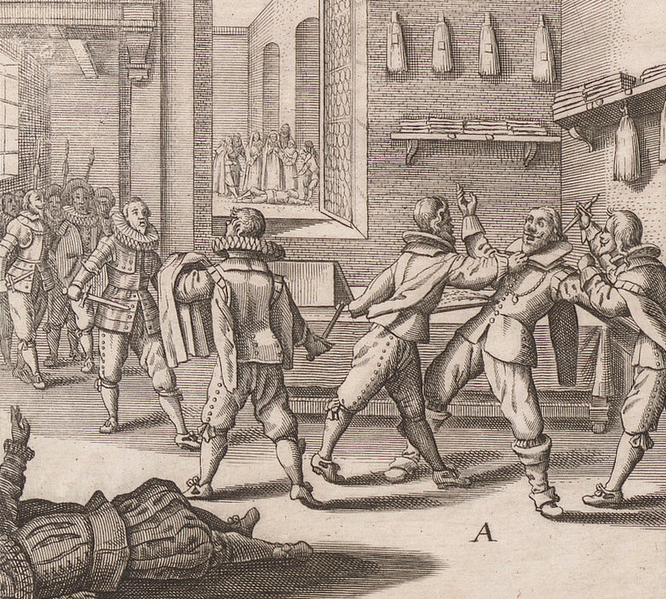
By unknown (17th century), Royal Collection UK

== See also ==
- History of Portugal (1578-1777)

Preceded by Filipe de Mesquita	Prime Minister of Portugal (Secretary of State); 1635–1640	Succeeded by Francisco de Lucena
