= El Sauzal =

- Municipality
- Flag Coat of arms

- Municipal location in Tenerife

- Location in Province of Santa Cruz de Tenerife El Sauzal (Canary Islands) El Sauzal (Spain, Canary Islands)
- Coordinates: 28°28′40″N 16°26′10″W
- Country: Spain
- Autonomous Region: Canary Islands
- Province: Santa Cruz de Tenerife
- Island: Tenerife

Area
  - Total: 18.31 km^{2} (7.07 sq mi)
- Elevation: 322 m (1,056 ft)

Population (2025-01-01)
  - Total: 9,345
  - Density: 510.4/km^{2} (1,322/sq mi)
- Time zone: UTC+0 (GMT)
- Climate: Csb

El Sauzal is a town and a municipality in the northeastern part of the island of Tenerife, Canary Islands, Spain. It is located on the north coast, 12 km west of San Cristóbal de La Laguna, 13 km northeast of La Orotava and 18 km west of the island's capital, Santa Cruz de Tenerife. The TF-5 motorway passes through the municipality. The population is 9,076 (2013) and the area is 18.31 km^{2}.

== Historical population ==
Year	Population
2001	7,561
2010	8,930
2013	9,076

== People ==
- Mary of Jesus de León y Delgado (23 March 1643 – 15 February 1731), nun and mystic, whose body remains incorrupt.
- Paulino Rivero Baute (1952 –), politician and president of the Government of Canary Islands in the 2007-2010 and 2011-2015 legislatures.

== See also ==
- List of municipalities in Santa Cruz de Tenerife
