= Georg Ludwig Agricola =

Georg Ludwig Agricola (25 October 1643 – 20 February 1676) was a German composer.

== Biography ==
Agricola was born at Großfurra (now Sondershausen) in Thuringia, where his father was a clergyman. He was brought up at Eisenach and Gotha, and attended the universities of Wittenberg and Leipzig. He became kapellmeister at Gotha in 1670.

He composed Musikalische Nebenstunden for two violins, two violas, and bass; religious hymns and madrigals; and sonatas and preludes, "in the French style." He died at Gotha in at the age of thirty-three, full of promise, but without accomplishing a style for himself.

== Works ==
- Buß- und Communionlieder mit 5 und mehr Stimmen, Gotha 1675.
- Deutsche geistliche Madrigalien mit 2—6 Stimmen, Gotha 1675.
- Musikalische Nebenstunden in etlichen Sonaten, Präludien, Allemanden etc. mit 2 Violinen, 2 Violen und Generalbaß, Mühlhausen 1670 (Becker, Tonw).
- Sonaten, Präludien, Allemanden etc. auf französische Art, 3 parts, Gotha 1675.
