= Gabriel Revel =

French painter

Gabriel Revel (10 May 1643 – 9 July 1712) was a French painter.

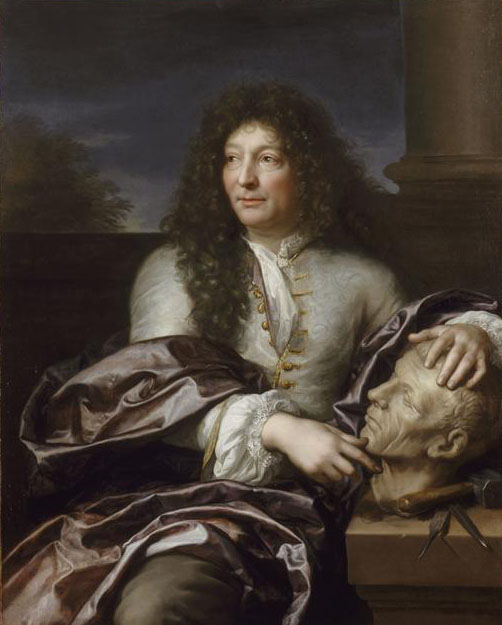
Gabriel Revel, portrait of François Girardon

== Life ==
He was born in Château-Thierry, in a family of artists. He went to Paris, probably on the advice of Jean de La Fontaine. He joined the group of decorative artists working for Louis XIV, including François Verdier, Claude II Audran et François Bonnemer, on the Soleil Royal. It is thought that he worked with Charles Le Brun at the Palace of Versailles.

Probably after a voyage to Italy, Revel was accepted into the Académie Royale on 31 January 1682 on the basis of his portraits of François Girardon and Michel Anguier. For the city of Dijon in 1688 he painted the ceiling of the Chambre des requêtes in the Parlement de Bourgogne, with an Allegory of Justice. Moving to Dijon in 1692 he produced a large number of historical paintings and portraits.

He died at Dijon.

== Accreditation ==
One of Revel's paintings, now titled Portrait of an Astronomer (circa 1670), was thought to be a portrait of philosopher René Descartes by Pierre Mignard and was gifted to the National Gallery by Lady Carlisle in 1913.
