= Mary of Jesus de León y Delgado =

Spanish Dominican lay sister, mystic and visionary

Servant of God Mary of Jesus de León y Delgado OP
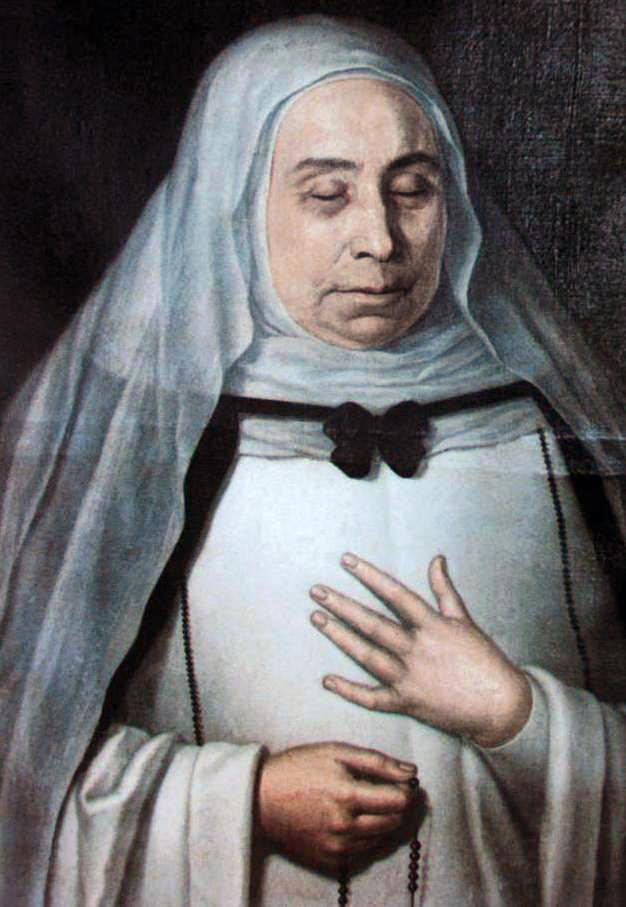
- La Siervita ("The little servant")
- Born: 23 March 1643; El Sauzal, Tenerife, Spain
- Died: 15 February 1731 (aged 87); San Cristóbal de La Laguna, Tenerife, Spain

Mary of Jesus de León y Delgado (Spanish: Sor María de Jesús), was a 17th-century Spanish Dominican lay sister, mystic and visionary. She was widely known as La Siervita ("the little servant") in the Canary Islands. She lived a life that was austere and simple. Many miracles were attributed to her.

De León died with a reputation for sanctity. She is one of the most revered of the native people of the Canary Islands, together with Peter of Saint Joseph Betancur and José de Anchieta. The cause for her beatification has been submitted to the Holy See for review. She is designated as a Servant of God.

== Early life ==
De León was born on 23 March 1643, to Andrés de León y Bello and María Delgado y Perera, in the town of El Sauzal, on Tenerife, of the Spanish Canary Islands. Her family was said to be humble but of noble origin. She was the youngest child, and had two sisters and a brother. She may have been of Guanche ancestry.

After De León's father died in 1646, poverty overtook the family. Three years later, a couple from mainland Spain, who had relocated to the city of San Cristóbal de La Laguna, where the husband was to practice medicine, decided that they wanted another child in addition to their first to care for. The doctor's wife appealed to María Delgado to give up her youngest daughter to give her a better life. Two years later, the couple made plans to move to New Spain, intending to take Mary with them. But her birth mother recovered the girl.

Delgado died shortly after and a good friend, Inés Pérez, took her in. She lived in La Orotava.

When De León was a youth, two local women, who had the reputation of leading simple lives, came to her foster mother with a letter supposedly from the girl's maternal aunt, Catalina Delgado. It said that Delgado and her husband wished to care for the girl, and the bearers should accompany her to their farm. When they took her back to the city of San Cristóbal de La Laguna, one of the women approached a man in a back alley of the city. De León realized that she was in danger and escaped. She reached her aunt's home, where Catalina and her husband cared for her.

Her uncle was a lagoon farmer and wealthy landowner. De León gradually assisted in household duties and helped her uncle manage the estate. She rose at dawn and worked all day without signs of fatigue. Drawn to religious life, she declared her intention to enter a convent as a lay sister, a decision which her aunt and uncle accepted.

Initially De León's guardians wanted her to enter the local convent of the Poor Clares as the servant of their daughter was a choir nun in that community. De León had originally wanted to belong to the Order of the Discalced Carmelites, as she was devoted to their foundress, St. Teresa of Jesus. No convents of the Discalced Carmelite nuns had been founded in the Canary Islands, so De León entered a convent of the Dominican Order.

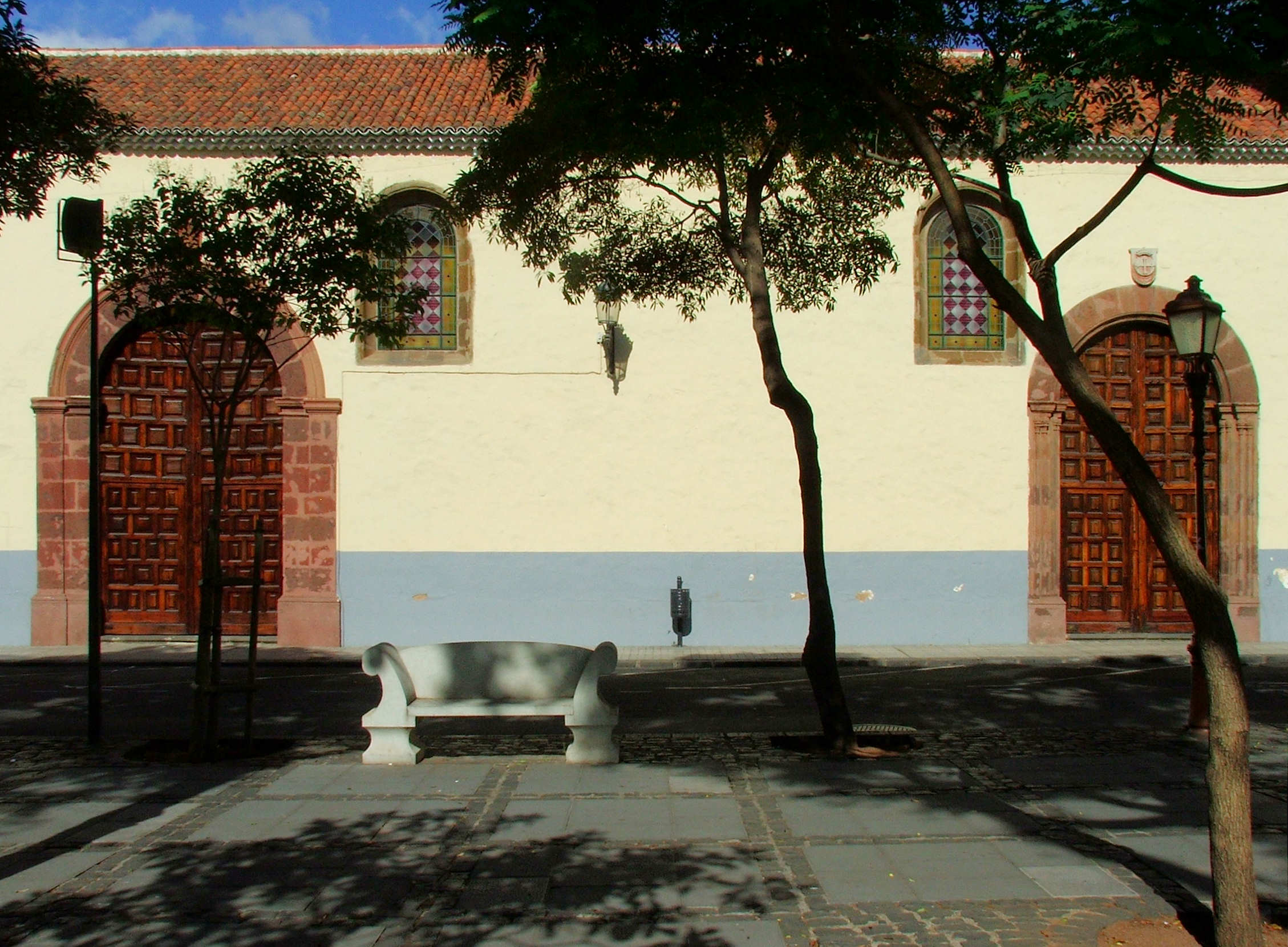
Convent of St. Catherine of Siena, where Mary of Jesus de León's remains lie

== Entrance to the convent ==
In February 1668, De León was admitted as a lay sister to the Dominican convent of St. Catherine of Siena in San Cristóbal de La Laguna. There she was to care for an elderly nun, Jacobina de San Jerónimo Suárez, OP.

From that point on, De León lived within convent until her death. It was during this time that many miracles were attributed to her. For instance, a devotional medal of hers, with the image of Our Lady of Solitude, was broken into pieces. It reassembled spontaneously after several days. In another incident, other nuns described her as having a possible episode of levitation.

De León was a mystic known to experience ecstasies, during which an emission of light could be seen coming from her face. Reportedly nuns noticed a marked heat emanating from her body, especially when she received the Eucharist.

De León was said to be friends with the noted corsair Amaro Rodríguez Felipe, popularly known as the "Amaro Pargo", whose sister was shared a cell with De León. The privateer claimed to have undergone a great miracle through De León. He recounted having been assaulted by a man while in Cuba. When the attacker would have stabbed Felipe with his dagger, the figure of De León appeared, interceding and preventing the pirate's death. This phenomenon, known as ubiquity or bilocation, and associated with many saints, is the capacity to be in two places simultaneously.

De León also had a great friendship with the Franciscan friar and mystic John of Jesus, who was her spiritual director. He counseled her in pursuing the spiritual life.

De León died on 15 February 1731, having lived within the walls of the convent for 63 years without leaving. Before her death, she fell into an ecstasy and died keeping a pulse and the pupils of her eyes clear for more than 24 hours. In her side, next to her heart, was found a wound, such as the one which would have been left in the side of Christ. Three years later her body was exhumed and was found incorrupt, whole and flexible. Her palate and tongue were preserved fresh and rosy, and jasmine-scented blood issued from her mouth.

== Beatification process ==
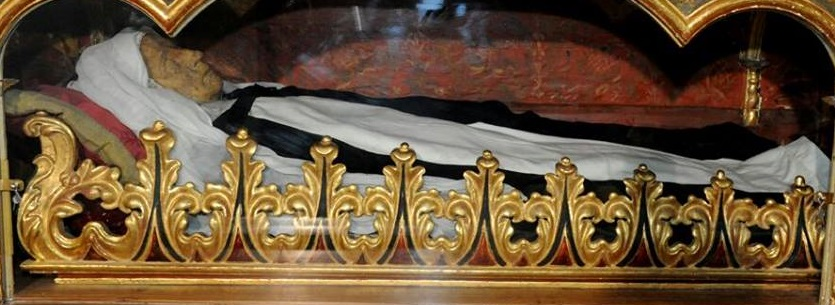
Incorrupt body of Mary of Jesus de León Delgado in the convent of St. Catherine of Siena

De León's incorrupt body is still preserved in the convent of St. Catherine, where she lived out her life. Every 15 February (the anniversary of her death), her body is placed on public display in a reliquary, which was donated by the corsair Amaro Pargo, who was present at the exhumation. Because of the numerous pilgrims and devotees who want to see her incorrupt body, the reliquary is also displayed on the following Sunday.

A formal inquiry into De León's life for her beatification process was opened in the 19th century, but ceased. The cause was reopened in 1992 and has been submitted to the Holy See. Supporters of the cause expressed their dismay by this lack of progress, despite a document from 1771 that lists 1,251 miracles attributed to her intercession.

Although she has not been beatified, the veneration of Mary of Jesus has become the equivalent in the Canary Islands to Ss. Teresa of Ávila in continental Spain, Catherine of Siena in Italy and Rose of Lima in Peru and Latin America.

== Miracles ==
Miracles associated with De León are:

- Levitation: The ability to maintain stable suspension in the air; it was described by several nuns of the convent.
- Bilocation: The ability to be in two places simultaneously. De León was credited with saving the life of the privateer Amaro Rodríguez through her appearance during an assault on him while he was in Cuba.
- Hyperthermia: A remarkable elevation of body temperature and the emission of light from the head or face.
- Clairvoyance: The nun prophesied her own attempted abduction, a great flood, and an eruption of the Teide volcano, among other events.
- Stigmata: When she died, a wound as if by a lance was found near her heart.
- Psychokinesis: Ability to move objects by an invisible force.

== See also ==
- List of saints of the Canary Islands

== Sources ==
- García Barbusano, Domingo (1990). Sor María de Jesús: la monja incorrupta del convento de Santa Catalina de La Laguna. Edited by the Convent of Santa Catalina de Siena in La Laguna. ISBN 84-4046-866-0.
- Rodríguez Moure, José (2005). Cuadros históricos de la admirable vida y virtudes de La Sierva de Dios: Sor María de Jesús de León Delgado. Editorial Artemisa. ISBN 84-9637-415-7.
