= Francisco de Lucena =

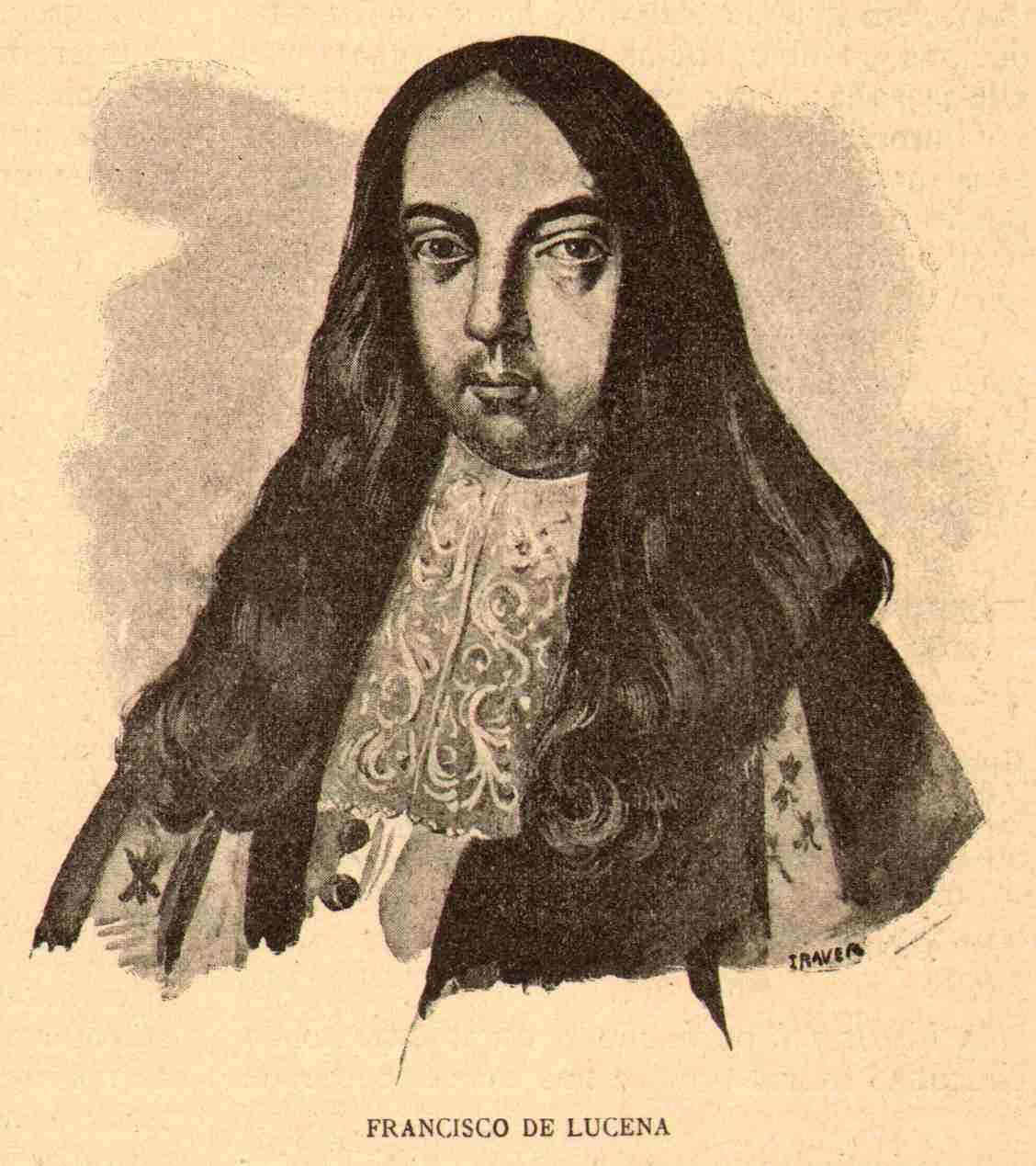

Secretary of State of Portugal
- In office 1640–1642
- Monarch: John IV of Portugal
- Preceded by: Miguel de Vasconcelos
- Succeeded by: Pedro Vieira da Silva

Secretary of the Crown Council
- In office 1614–1631
- Monarchs: Philip II of Portugal and Philip III of Portugal
- Preceded by: Fernando de Matos

Personal details
- Born: c. 1578
- Died: 28 April 1643 Limoeiro Prison, Lisbon
- Spouse: D. Francisca de Castro
- Children: D. Afonso de Lucena; Martim Afonso de Lucena; Fernão de Matos de Lucena; Guiomar de Lucena; Isabel de Lucena; Leonor de Lucena; Antónia Maria de Ataíde; Joana de Mendonça

Francisco de Lucena (c. 1578 – 28 April 1643) was a Portuguese nobleman and King John IV's first Secretary of State (Head of Government), and the first after the Restoration War and end of the Iberian Union. He made many enemies during his term in office, and was rumoured to be fraternising with the Spanish Crown, which led to his imprisonment and, later, his execution.

== Biography ==
=== Early life ===
He was supposedly born in around 1578, in Vila Viçosa. At some point in his life, he married D. Francisca de Castro, and was made Knight of the Order of Christ.

In 1614, during the Iberian Union, he succeeded his uncle Fernando de Matos, as King Philip II of Portugal's Secretary of the Crown Council. He lived in Madrid, in Spain, in this capacity for 17 years.

=== As Secretary of State ===
Francisco de Lucena had familial ties to the House of Braganza via his father, Afonso de Lucena (1548–1607), a jurist. When John was acclaimed King of Portugal, Francisco de Lucena was made his Secretary of State (Secretário de Estado), holding the post from 1640 to 1642.

A practiced diplomat, de Lucena was in a very powerful and deliberative station. He advised King John to keep all titles and privileges given during the Habsburg rule, as to avoid rebellions and acts of treachery against him. On the other hand, by his suggestion, King John's supporters were seldom honoured for their actions during the Restoration War. When the Archbishop of Braga, the Duke of Caminha and the Marquess of Vila Real were charged with treason against the new monarch, Francisco de Lucena spared his indulgence and condemned them all to death by beheading, even providing the cleaver that had cut off Rodrigo Calderón's head in his execution in Madrid.

=== Imprisonment and death ===
De Lucena made many enemies whilst in office, among them the Jesuit and generals. De Lucena was rumoured to keep subversive correspondence with Spain, and was charged with treason in 1642 by the Court.
King John, however, knew the correspondence was not unlawful, as it were negotiations for the release of de Lucena's son from a Spanish prison in return for the release of a Spanish prisoner in Portugal. The King was against his sentence to death, and Francisco de Lucena was, instead, imprisoned in the Limoeiro prison, in Lisbon. Easily (and falsely) incriminated by the Jesuit and his successor in the post of Secretary of State (Pedro Vieira da Silva) of having surrendered the Santa Luzia Fort, in Elvas, to the Spaniards, he was finally sentenced to beheading (with the same cleaver used in the Archbishop of Braga, the Duke of Caminha and the Marquess of Vila Real case) on 28 April 1643.

Preceded by Miguel de Vasconcelos	Secretary of State of Portugal (Prime Minister); 1640–1642	Succeeded by Pedro Vieira da Silva
