= François-Joseph de Beaupoil de Sainte-Aulaire =

French poet and army officer

Coat of arms of Beaupoil de Saint-Aulaire

François-Joseph de Beaupoil, marquis de Sainte-Aulaire (6 September 1643, château de Bary, Limousin – 17 December 1742, Paris) was a French poet and army officer.
