= 1760s =

Decade

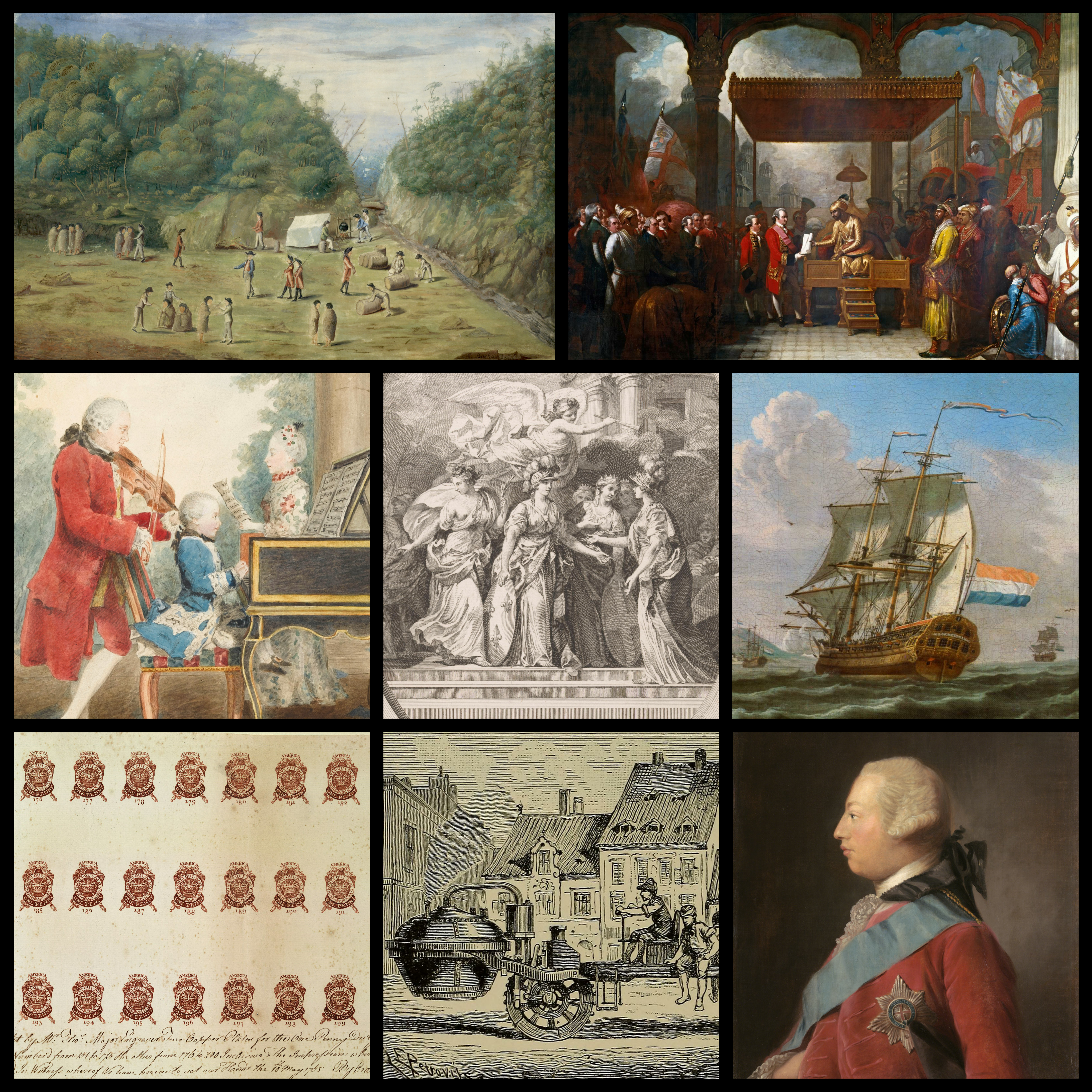
From top left, clockwise: English Explorer James Cook commenced his first voyage around the world, becoming the first known Europeans to reach the east coast of Australia; victory at the Battle of Buxar and subsequent Treaty of Allahabad marked start of the political and constitutional involvement East India Company and the beginning of British rule in India; the Dutch ship, the Meermin is taken over by the slaves it was transporting in the Meermin slave mutiny; George III is crowned king of the United Kingdom and would go on to reign longer than any of his predecessors; French inventor Nicolas-Joseph Cugnot built the world's first full-size and working self-propelled mechanical land-vehicle, the "Fardier à vapeur" — effectively the world's first automobile; the Stamp Act is passed by the British parliament, required that many printed materials in the colonies be produced on stamped paper produced in London. The unpopularity of the Stamp Act, and other such taxes levied by the parliament would contribute to the start of the American revolution; Leopold Mozart and his family toured Europe allowing their children to experience the full the cosmopolitan musical world which, in Wolfgang's case, would continue through further journeys in the following six years, prior to his appointment by the Prince-Archbishop as a court musician; the signing of the Treaty of Paris formally ended the Seven Years' War and marked the beginning of an era of British dominance outside Europe.

Map of the world on Mercators projection (1766)

The 1760s (pronounced "seventeen-sixties") was a decade of the Gregorian calendar that began on January 1, 1760, and ended on December 31, 1769.

Marked by great upheavals on culture, technology, and diplomacy, the 1760s was a transitional decade that effectively brought on the modern era from Baroqueism. The Seven Years' War – arguably the most widespread conflict of its time – carried trends of imperialism outside of European reaches, where it would head on to countless territories (mainly in Asia and Africa) for decades to come under colonialism.

== Events ==
=== January–March ===
- January 9 – Battle of Barari Ghat: Afghan forces defeat the Marathas.
- January 22 – Seven Years' War – Battle of Wandiwash, India: British general Sir Eyre Coote is victorious over the French under the Marquis de Bussy-Castelnau.
- January 28 – Benning Wentworth creates the New Hampshire Grant of Pownal, Vermont.
- February 15 – The British Royal Navy ship HMS Royal Katherine runs aground off Bolt Head in England, with the loss of 699 lives.
- February 21–26 – Seven Years' War: Battle of Carrickfergus in the north of Ireland – A force of French troops, under the command of privateer François Thurot, captures and holds the town and castle of Carrickfergus before retiring; the force is defeated (and Thurot killed) in the naval Battle of Bishops Court in the Irish Sea on February 28.
- February 27 – Seven Years' War: French and Indian War & Anglo-Cherokee War – Cherokee natives attack a North Carolina militia stationed at Fort Dobbs, in the western part of the province. The attack is repelled by the militia, under the command of General Hugh Waddell.
- March 20 – The Great Fire of Boston, Massachusetts, destroys 349 buildings and marks the biggest conflagration in the American colonies up to this time.

=== April–June ===
- April 3 – Great Britain and Prussia agree to begin peace negotiations to end the Seven Years' War.
- April 7 – 'Tacky's War', a slave rebellion, begins in Jamaica and lasts for 18 months. During the uprising, 60 white residents are killed and more than 400 black rebels die in the suppression of the revolt. Another 500 are deported to British Honduras.
- April 10 – France's Minister of the Navy Nicolas René Berryer finally receives permission to send ships to assist French forces at Quebec, and a fleet of six ships under the command of Captain François Chenard de la Giraudais of the French frigate Machault departs Bordeaux, albeit too late to prevent the loss of New France to the British.
- April 11 – The Burmese Army, under the command of King Alaungpaya, reaches the outskirts of Siam's capital, Ayutthaya, but then retreats rather than laying siege to the city.
- April 12 – Two of six French ships run into a British blockade led by Britain's Admiral Edward Boscawen. Of the remaining four, one sinks before it can reach North America.
- April 20 – France's Marshal François Gaston de Lévis departs from Montreal up the St. Lawrence River with 7,000 troops on a plan to retake Quebec City from the British.
- April 22 – Belgian entertainer Joseph Mervin is said to have given the first demonstration of roller skates, in a performance at the Carlisle House in London, but the stunt ends in disaster.
- April 26 – Marshal Lévis and his troops land at Saint-Augustin-de-Desmaures, adjacent to Quebec City, and prepares to lay siege to the British occupying force.
- April 27 – British Army Brigadier General James Murray marches a force of 3,500 men toward Saint-Augustin to confront Marshal Lévis and the French Army.
- April 28 – British defenders and the French Army clash at the Battle of Sainte-Foy to determine the future control of Quebec. General Murray is forced to retreat after the British suffer 259 deaths and 845 wounded, while the French under Marshal Lévis suffer 193 deaths and 640 wounded.
- April 29 – Representatives of the remaining Penobscot Indian tribes in Maine and New Brunswick make peace with the British at Fort Pownal in Newfoundland.
- April 30 – Swiss mathematician Daniel Bernoulli presents a paper at the French Academy of Sciences in Paris in which "a mathematical model was used for the first time to study the population dynamics of infectious disease."
- May 11 – King Alaungpaya of Burma dies during a retreat from Ayutthaya after stopping at the village of Kinywa while en route to Martaban. His son Naungdawgyi becomes the new King of Burma.
- May 16 – Three British Royal Navy ships under the command of Commodore Robert Swanton on HMS Vanguard arrive to break the siege of Quebec before Marshal Lévis can recapture the city from the British.
- May 17 – Captain Giraudais's French fleet reaches the Gaspé Peninsula of northeast Quebec and captures seven British merchant ships, but Giraudais learns that the British have already preceded him up the St. Lawrence River and diverts to Chaleur Bay at Newfoundland.
- June 4 – Expulsion of the Acadians: New England planters arrive to claim land in Nova Scotia taken from the Acadians.
- June 11 – Robert Rogers and his Rangers launch a strike from Lake Champlain against French military posts along the Richelieu River – they strike at Fort Sainte Thérèse and destroy the settlement.
- June 19 – The British create Cumberland County and Lincoln County in Maine.
- June 22 – Britain's Captain John Byron, commanding HMS Fame, locates France's Captain Giraudais but runs aground on June 25 before it can attack.

=== July–September ===
- July 3 – A lightning strike causes a major fire at Portsmouth Royal Dockyard in England.
- July 8 – Seven Years' War: French and Indian War – Battle of Restigouche: The British defeat French forces, in the last naval battle in New France.
- July 19 – A formal request is made to the Spanish government, to allow the founding of the later city of Mayagüez, Puerto Rico.
- July 31 – Seven Years' War: Battle of Warburg – The Anglo-Hanoverian army of Ferdinand of Brunswick storms Warburg, with a heroic role being played by the English commander Lord Granby.
- August 21 – The church (later cathedral) of Our Lady of Candlemas of Mayagüez (Puerto Rico) is founded, establishing the basis for the founding of the city in the following month.
- August 30 – Seven Years' War: Battle of Legnica – By a series of brilliant maneuvers, Frederick the Great manages to defeat the Austrian army of Marshal Laudon before it can unite with that of Marshal Daun.
- September 8 – Seven Years' War: Jeffery Amherst and his British troops capture Montreal from the French, effectively bringing Canada completely under British control.
- September 18 – The town (later city) of Mayagüez, Puerto Rico, is founded.

=== October–December ===
- October 5 – The wedding of Princess Isabella of Parma and Prince Joseph of Austria takes place at Hofburg Palace's Redoute Hall (Redoutensaele), at the former imperial palace in Vienna.
- October 9 – Seven Years' War: Russian troops enter Berlin.
- October 16 – Seven Years' War: Battle of Kloster-Kamp – Ferdinand of Brunswick is beaten back from the Rhine by a French army.
- October 25 – King George II of Great Britain and Ireland dies; his 22-year-old grandson George, Prince of Wales, succeeds to the throne as George III and reigns for 59 years until his death on January 29, 1820.
- November 3 – Seven Years' War: Battle of Torgau – In another extremely hard battle, Frederick defeats Daun's Austrians, who withdraw across the Elbe.
- November 29 – French Army Colonel François-Marie Picoté de Belestre formally surrenders Detroit to British Army Major Robert Rogers, and the British Union Jack is raised over Fort Detroit.
- December 4 – For the first time since the surrender of Fort Detroit by France, British authorities meet nearby at a Native American council house with delegates from various Indian tribes that had fought as allies of the French Army, such as the Wyandot and Ottawa Indians, and with tribes that had formerly been allies of the British. The European and Native American representatives open the peace conference with the presentation by the Indians to the British of a wampum belt, and the pronouncement from the principal chief that "The ancient friendship is now renewed, and I wash the blood off the earth that had been shed during the present war, that you may bury the war hatchet in the bottomless pit."
- December 6 – The siege of Pondicherry, a stronghold of France in India, is begun by British Army Lieutenant General Eyre Coote. The French commander, General Thomas Lally, is finally forced to surrender Pondicherry to the British on January 15, 1761.
- December 18 – In the wake of Tacky's War by African-born rebels, the Assembly of the British colony of Jamaica outlaws the African religious practice of obeah, with penalties ranging from banishment from the colony to execution. The legislation specifically bans use of contraband associated with obeah, including "animal blood, feathers, parrots' beaks, dogs' teeth, alligators' teeth, broken bottles, grave dirt, rum, and eggshells".

=== Date unknown ===
- Abbé Charles-Michel de l'Épée opens a school for deaf education in Paris which becomes the Institut National de Jeunes Sourds de Paris, the world's first free school for the deaf; Thomas Braidwood establishes Braidwood's Academy for the Deaf and Dumb in Edinburgh, the first school for the deaf in Britain.
- Western countries pay 3,000,000 ounces of silver for Chinese goods.
- approximate date – Abu Dhabi is founded.

=== January–March ===
- January 14 – Third Battle of Panipat: In India, the armies of the Durrani Empire from Afghanistan, led by Ahmad Shah Durrani and his coalition decisively defeat the Maratha Confederacy, killing over 100,000 Maratha soldiers and civilians in battle and in a subsequent massacre, regaining territory lost by the Mughal Empire and restoring the Mughal Emperor, Shah Alam II, to the throne in Delhi as the nominal ruler.
- January 16 – In India, the Siege of Pondicherry ends as the British Empire captures Pondichéry from the French colonial empire.
- February 8 – An earthquake in London breaks chimneys in Limehouse and Poplar.
- March 8 – A second earthquake occurs in North London, Hampstead and Highgate.
- March 31 – An 8.5 magnitude earthquake strikes Lisbon in the Kingdom of Portugal, with effects felt as far north as Scotland, but few deaths are reported because of censorship by the Portuguese government.

=== April–June ===
- April 1 – The Austrian Empire and the Russian Empire sign a new treaty of alliance.
- April 4 – A severe epidemic of influenza breaks out in London and "practically the entire population of the city" is afflicted; particularly contagious to pregnant women, the disease causes an unusual number of miscarriages and premature births.
- April 14 – Thomas Boone is transferred south to become the Royal Governor of South Carolina after proving to be unable to work with the local assembly as the Royal Governor of New Jersey.
- May 4 – The first multiple death tornado in the 13 American colonies strikes Charleston, South Carolina, killing eight people and sinking five ships in harbor.
- May 9 – Exhibition of 1761, the innaugaral exhibition of the Society of Artists of Great Britain opens at Spring Gardens in London
- June 6 – (May 26 old style); A transit of Venus occurs, and is observed from 120 locations around the Earth. In his observations by telescope at St. Petersburg, Mikhail Lomonosov notes a ring of light around the planet's silhouette as it begins the transit, and becomes the first astronomer to discover that the planet Venus has an atmosphere.

=== July–September ===
- July 17 – The first section of the Bridgewater Canal is opened, for the transportation of coal from local mines to Manchester.
- August 6 – The Parlement of Paris votes to close all colleges, associations and seminaries associated with the Jesuit Order, following a long campaign by Louis-Adrien Le Paige.
- August 11 – Two years after his marriage to Martha Custis and his move to Mount Vernon, American military officer and politician George Washington advertises a reward in the Maryland Gazette for the capture of four fugitive slaves who ran away from him: Cupid, Peros, Jack and Neptune, claiming in the gazette that they had escaped "without the least suspicion, provocation, or difference with anybody".
- August 15 – The Third Family Compact is executed by King Charles III of Spain and King Louis XV of France, as well as representatives of members of the House of Bourbon, King Ferdinand IV of Naples and Philip, Duke of Parma.
- August 29 – Cherokee chief Attakullakulla and British Army officer Major James Grant meet at Fort Prince George in the Province of South Carolina and begin negotiations to end the Anglo-Cherokee War.
- September 8 – George III marries Charlotte of Mecklenburg-Strelitz.
- September 19 – Slavery in Portugal is abolished.
- September 22 – George III and Charlotte of Mecklenburg-Strelitz are crowned.

=== October–December ===
- October 1 – Austrian field marshal Ernst Gideon von Laudon captures the Prussian town of Schweidnitz (now Świdnica in Poland) during the Seven Years' War.
- October 5 – William Pitt is dismissed from his position as Secretary of State for the Southern Department after having been a powerful part of a coalition government with the Prime Minister, the Duke of Newcastle.
- October 30 – Colonel Henry Bouquet issues the first proclamation against Anglo-American settlement on Indian lands in America.
- November 7 – The New London Harbor Light is first lit to guide ships into the Connecticut harbor; the lighthouse, only the fourth to be built has been in continuous operation for more than 250 years.
- November 11 – The Earl of Egremont, serving as Secretary of State for the Southern Department, initiated a policy which forbids the issuing of any land grants to white settlers in territory occupied by the American Indian tribes.
- November 19 – A separate peace treaty is signed between the Cherokee Indians and the Colony of Virginia, bringing the Anglo-Cherokee War to a close.
- November 26 – A 500-man force from the Army of Spain brings the revolt of Mexico's Maya population to an end, capturing the Yucatan village of Cisteil, killing about 500 of the 2,500 Mayan defenders and losing 40 of their own. The Spaniards arrest 254 people, including Jacinto Canek, who had proclaimed himself as King Canek Montezuma of the Mayas. Canek and eight other rebellion leaders are executed less than three weeks later.
- December 16 – Seven Years' War: After four months of siege, the Russians under Pyotr Rumyantsev take the Prussian fortress of Kolberg.

=== Date unknown ===
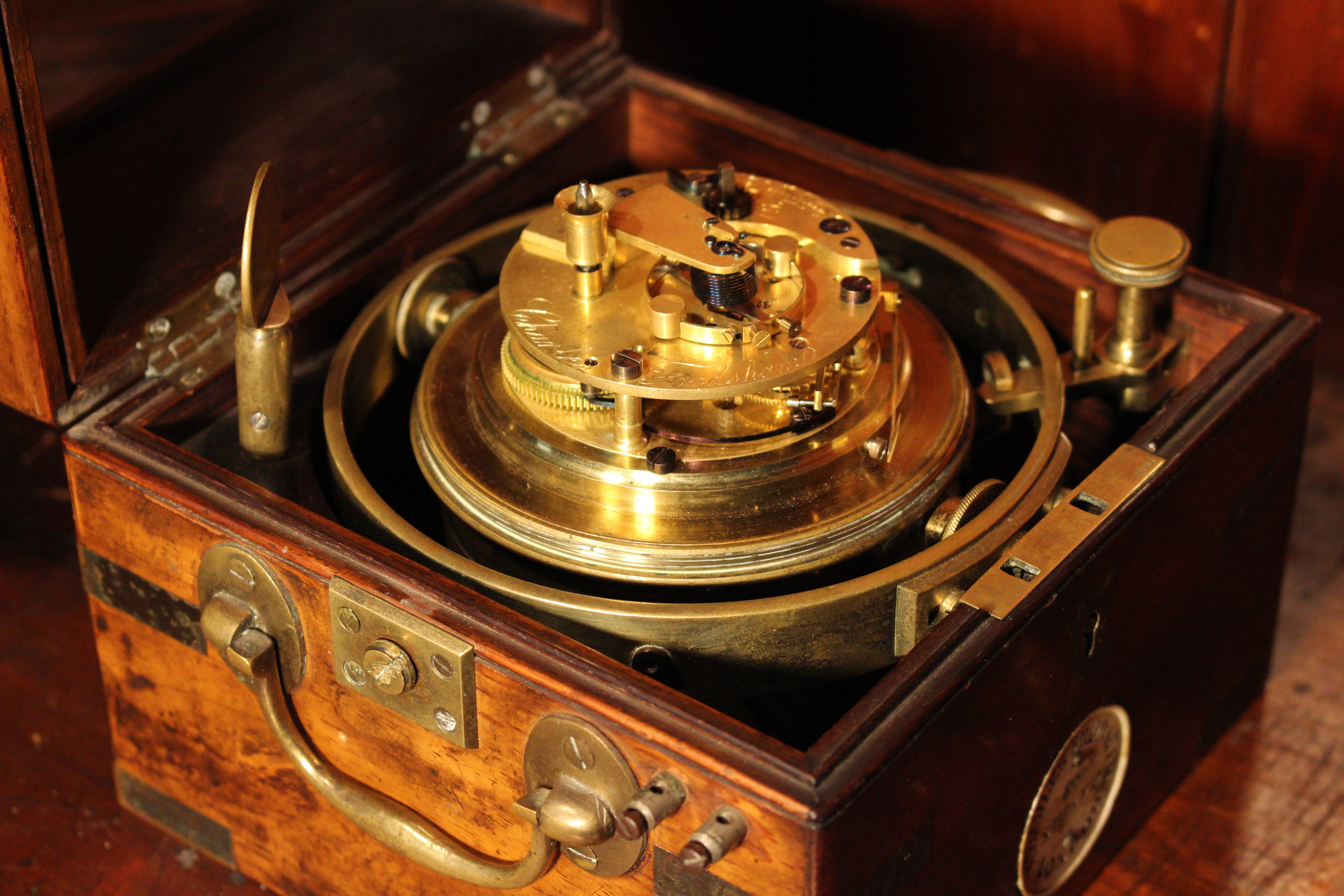
Marine chronometer

- The Halifax Treaties are concluded between the various bands of the Miꞌkmaq, other First Nations people and the British in Halifax, Nova Scotia, notably in the Burying the Hatchet ceremony on June 25.
- In Dutch Guyana, a "state" formed by escaped slaves signs a treaty with the local governor.
- Marine chronometer invented as a means to accurately determine longitude.
- Matthew Boulton's Soho Manufactory opens in the midlands of England.
- The music for "Ah! vous dirai-je, maman" ("Ah, would I tell you Mom?") is first published in France by a Monsieur Bouin in his book Les Amusements d'une Heure et Demy; in 1806, English poet Jane Taylor publishes her poem, The Star, whose words fit the rhythm of the tune and become the children's song Twinkle Twinkle Little Star.
- Faber-Castell Company is founded by Kasper Faber in Nuremberg, Germany.
- Johann Heinrich Lambert finds a proof that π is irrational.
- l'Ordre des Chevaliers Maçons Élus Coëns de l'Univers is founded.

=== January–March ===
- January 4 – Seven Years' War: Britain declares war against Spain and Naples, following their recent alliance with France.
- January 5 – Empress Elisabeth of Russia dies, and is succeeded by her nephew Peter III. Peter, an admirer of Frederick the Great, immediately opens peace negotiations with the Prussians.
- January 16 – British forces under Robert Monckton land on the French island of Martinique in the Caribbean.
- February 5 – The Great Holocaust of the Sikhs is carried out by the forces of Ahmed Shah Abdali in Punjab. In all, around 30,000 men, women and children perish in this campaign of slaughter.
- February 15 – Invasion of Martinique (1762): French forces on Martinique surrender to the British. The island is subsequently returned to France, as part of the Peace of Paris.
- March 5 – A Royal Navy fleet with 16,000 men departs Britain from Spithead and sets sail toward Cuba in order to seize strategic Spanish Empire possessions in the Americas.
- March 10 – Jean Calas, a 68 year old French merchant convicted unjustly of murdering his son because of religious differences, is brutally executed on orders of the Parlement of Toulouse. After his legs and hips are broken and crushed, Calas is tortured on the breaking wheel (la roue), to remain "in pain and repentance for his crimes and misdeeds, for as long as it shall please God to keep him alive."
- March 17 – The first Saint Patrick's Day Parade in New York City takes place in lower Manhattan, inaugurating an annual tradition; the Ancient Order of the Hibernians organization later becomes the sponsor of the event, which attracts as many a 300,000 marchers in some years.
- March 20 – Innovative publisher Samuel Farley launches the weekly newspaper The American Chronicle, the seventh in New York City.

=== April–June ===
- April 2 – A powerful earthquake along the border between modern-day Bangladesh and Myanmar causes a tsunami in the Bay of Bengal that kills at least 200 people.
- April 5 – France issues a new ordinance requiring all black and mixed-race Frenchmen to register their identity information with the offices of the Admiralty Court, upon the advice of Guillaume Poncet de la Grave, adviser to King Louis XV. The new rule, which requires both free and enslaved blacks and mulattoes to list data including their age, surname, purpose for which they are residing in France, whether they have been baptized as Christians, where they emigrated from in Africa and the name of the ship upon which they arrived. Previously, the Declaration of 1738 required slave-owners to register their slaves, but placed no requirement on free people.
- May 5 (April 24 O.S.) – The Treaty of Saint Petersburg ends the war between Russia and Prussia, and returns all of Russia's territorial conquests to the Prussians.
- May 22 – The Treaty of Hamburg takes Sweden out of the war against Prussia.
- May 26 – Dissatisfied with the progress of the French and Indian War, King George III dismisses his Prime Minister, the Duke of Newcastle, and replaces him with his former tutor, Tory politician John Stuart, 3rd Earl of Bute. The Bute ministry lasts less than a year before Stuart's resignation in 1763.
- May 31 – Marco Foscarini becomes the new Doge of the Republic of Venice after the death of Francesco Loredan, who had administered the Republic for 10 years.
- June 8 – Cherokee Indian war chief Ostenaco and his two aides, Standing Turkey (Cunneshote) and Pouting Pigeon, are received by King George III. They had arrived three days earlier at Plymouth on the British frigate Epreuvre as guests of the Timberlake Expedition of Henry Timberlake, to discuss terms of peace with the British government.
- June 24 – Battle of Wilhelmsthal: The Anglo-Hanoverian army of Ferdinand of Brunswick defeats the French forces in Westphalia. The British commander Lord Granby distinguishes himself.

=== July–September ===
- July 9 – Catherine II becomes empress of Russia after planning the overthrow of her husband, the Tsar Peter III. The incipient Russo-Prussian alliance falls apart, but Russia does not rejoin the war. Peter is strangled eight days later.
- July 21 – Battle of Burkersdorf: In his last major battle, Frederick defeats Marshal Daun in Silesia.
- August 13 – Seven Years' War: The Battle of Havana concludes after more than two months, with the surrender of Havana by Spain to Great Britain.
- August 21 – King Prithvi Narayan Shah of Gorkha conquers Makwanpur.
- September 15
  - French and Indian War: Battle of Signal Hill – British troops defeat the French in the last battle of the North American theatre of the Seven Years' War, fought in the Newfoundland Colony.
  - Empress Go-Sakuramachi succeeds to the throne of Japan upon the death of her brother, the Emperor Momozono. She reigns for eight years before abdicating on January 9, 1771. She was the last empress regnant of Japan up to this day.
- September 24–October 6 – Battle of Manila: Troops of the British East India Company take Manila from the Spanish, leading to the British occupation of Manila and its being made an open port.

=== October–December ===
- October 5 – Orfeo ed Euridice by Cristoph Willibald Gluck was given its first performance.
- October 7 – Siege of Schweidnitz in Silesia. Prussia takes the strategic fortress from Austria.
- October 29 – Battle of Freiberg: Prince Henry of Prussia, Frederick's brother, defeats the Austrian army of Marshal Serbelloni.
- November 13 – In the Treaty of Fontainebleau, Louis XV secretly cedes Louisiana (New France) to Charles III of Spain to compensate his ally for territorial losses to Britain.
- December 4 – Less than six months after becoming Russia's Empress, Catherine the Great announces that almost all foreigners are welcome to travel to and settle in Russia, and waives previous requirements that new residents must be members of the Russian Orthodox Church; however, the manifesto adds the phrase kromye Zhydov - "except the Jews".
- December 22 – Catherine follows the waiver of religious requirement for Russian immigration with a 190-word invitation, translated into various European languages, that invites Europeans to build settlements along arable, but undeveloped, land in southern Russia along the Volga River; when the invitation attracts little notice, she follows on July 22 with a longer manifesto promising free travel expenses and a written guarantee of rights.

=== Date unknown ===
- Louis XV orders the construction of the Petit Trianon, in the park of the Palace of Versailles, for his mistress Madame de Pompadour.
- Neolin, a Lenape prophet, begins to preach in America.
- The North Carolina General Assembly incorporates Kingston, named for King George III, as the county seat of Dobbs County, North Carolina. The name is later shortened to Kinston in 1784.
- The town of Charlottesville, Virginia is founded.
- The Plymouth Synagogue is built in Plymouth, England, the oldest built by Ashkenazi Jews in the English-speaking world.
- Philosopher Jean-Jacques Rousseau's The Social Contract (Du Contrat social, ou Principes du droit politique) and Emile, or On Education (Émile, ou De l’éducation) are published in Amsterdam and The Hague respectively. In Rousseau's native Republic of Geneva they are publicly burned and prohibited in Paris.
- James "Athenian" Stuart and Nicholas Revett's architectural treatise Antiquities of Athens is published.
- Istoriya Slavyanobolgarskaya is finished by Paisius of Hilendar.

=== January–March ===
- January 27 – The seat of colonial administration in the Viceroyalty of Brazil is moved from Salvador to Rio de Janeiro.
- February 1 – The colonial authorities in the Province of North Carolina establish Mecklenburg County from the western portion of Anson County. The county is named for Charlotte of Mecklenburg-Strelitz, who married George III in 1761.
- February 10 – Seven Years' War – French and Indian War: The Treaty of Paris ends the war, and France cedes Canada (New France) to Great Britain.
- February 15 – The Treaty of Hubertusburg puts an end to the Seven Years' War between Prussia and Austria, and their allies France and Russia.
- February 23 – The Berbice Slave Uprising starts in the former Dutch colony of Berbice.
- March 1 – Charles Townshend becomes President of the Board of Trade in the British government.

=== April–June ===
- April 6 – The Théâtre du Palais-Royal, home to the Paris Opera for almost 90 years, is destroyed in an accidental fire.
- April 16 – George Grenville takes office as the new Prime Minister of Great Britain, after the Earl of Bute resigns amid criticism over Britain's concessions in the Treaty of Paris.
- April 18 – Marie-Josephte Corriveau is hanged near her home at Saint-Vallier, Quebec before being gibbeted after being found guilty by a military tribunal of twelve officers of murdering her husband. She becomes famous in French Canadian folklore as "la Corriveau".
- April 19 – Teedyuscung, known as the "King of the Delaware Indians" (the Lenape tribe) is assassinated by arsonists who burn down his home in Pennsylvania while he is sleeping, in an apparent retaliation for signing the Treaty of Easton to relinquish Lenape claims to the Province of New Jersey.
- April 23 – The controversial Issue 45 of John Wilkes's satirical newspaper The North Briton is published as a response to a speech four days earlier by King George III praising the end of the Seven Years' War. In what will become a test case for freedom of speech, Wilkes, a member of Parliament, is arrested for libel of the King and imprisoned, then flee to France.
- April 27 – Outraged by the British success in taking control of land in North America formerly occupied by the French, Pontiac, chief of the Odawa people, convenes a conference near Detroit and convinces the leaders of 17 other nations of the need to attack British outposts.
- May 7 – Chief Pontiac begins "Pontiac's War" by attacking the British garrison at Fort Detroit, but the surprise attack is given away by a young native girl who informs the British of the plan. Two days later he begins the Siege of Fort Detroit.
- June 2 – Pontiac's War: At what becomes Mackinaw City, Michigan, Chippewas capture Fort Michilimackinac by diverting the garrison's attention with a game of lacrosse, then chasing a ball into the fort.
- June 28 – A magnitude 6.2 earthquake shakes Hungary and Slovakia, with a maximum Mercalli intensity of IX (Violent). Damage is limited, but 83 are killed.

=== July–September ===
- July 7 – The British East India Company declares Mir Qasim, the Nawab of Bengal, to be deposed.
- July 9 – The Mozart family grand tour of Europe began, lifting the profile of child prodigy Wolfgang Amadeus.
- July 28 {O.S. July 17) – The Russo-Circassian War begins, when the Russian Empire attempts to annex Circassia.
- August 2 – Mir Qasim is routed at Odwa Nala. He flees to Patna, where he massacres the English garrison, but is subsequently defeated at Katwa, Murshidabad, Giria, Sooty, Udayanala and Munger.
- August 3 and 4 – Amsterdam banking crisis: The spectacular bankruptcies of Leendert Pieter de Neufville and Johann Ernst Gotzkowsky lead to a financial contagion which in the following days affects many merchants in Amsterdam, Hamburg, Berlin and Stockholm.
- August 5 – Pontiac's War: Battle of Bushy Run – British forces led by Henry Bouquet defeat Chief Pontiac's Indians at Bushy Run, in the Pennsylvania backcountry.
- August – Fire in Smyrna, Ottoman Empire, destroys 2,600 houses.
- September 1 – Empress Catherine the Great of Russia endorses Ivan Betskoy's plans for a Foundling Home in Moscow.

=== October–December ===
- October 7 – The Royal Proclamation of 1763 is issued by George III of Great Britain, restricting the westward expansion of British North America, and stabilizing relations with the indigenous peoples of the Americas, by barring white settlement of lands west of the Appalachian Mountains.
- November 24 – Bayes' theorem is first announced.
- December 2 – Touro Synagogue, Newport, Rhode Island, is dedicated; by the end of the 20th century, this will be the oldest surviving synagogue in North America.
- December 14 – The Paxton Boys massacre six Conestoga Indians in their homes in Lancaster County, Pennsylvania. When the 16 survivors are sheltered in the Lancaster workhouse (jail), the Paxton Boys ride into town and kill them as well, on December 27.

=== Date unknown ===
- The Prussian education system is instituted as a compulsory system for boys and girls from age 5 to 13–14 by the Generallandschulreglement (General School Regulation), a decree of Frederick the Great authored by Johann Julius Hecker.
- Little Hagia Sophia in Istanbul, Ottoman Empire, is damaged in an earthquake.
- Joseph Haydn writes his Symphony No. 12 and Symphony No. 13 (August–December) for Nikolaus I, Prince Esterházy; also, at about this date, his Symphony No. 40.

=== January–June ===
- January 7 – The Siculicidium is carried out as hundreds of the Székely minority in Transylvania are massacred by the Austrian Army at Madéfalva.
- January 19 – John Wilkes is expelled from the House of Commons of Great Britain, for seditious libel.
- February 15 – The settlement of St. Louis is established.
- March 15 – The day after his return to Paris from a nine-year mission, French explorer and scholar Anquetil Du Perron presents a complete copy of the Zoroastrian sacred text, the Zend Avesta, to the Bibliothèque Royale in Paris, along with several other traditional texts. In 1771, he publishes the first European translation of the Zend Avesta.
- March 17 – Francisco Javier de la Torre arrives in Manila to become the new Spanish Governor-General of the Philippines.
- March 20 – After the British victory in the French and Indian War, the first post-war British expedition to explore the newly acquired territories east of the Mississippi River comes under attack by Tunica warriors. The 340 British Army men, under the command of Major Arthur Loftus, were at a spot south of Natchez, Mississippi and were forced to flee in their boats back toward the port of New Orleans while under fire from an unknown number of Tunicas firing from both banks.
- March 23 – Following lobbying by George Johnstone, the Governor of British West Florida, Britain's Lords of Trade vote to recommend the northern boundary for the new province to run from the confluence of the Yazoo River and the Mississippi (at modern-day Vicksburg, Mississippi) to the Chattahoochee River (at modern-day Phenix City, Alabama), and the Privy Council soon approves, bringing about 38,000 square miles (98,000 km^{2}) under the West Florida's jurisdiction.
- March 27 – The prince-electors, a group of nine German princes who select the next leader of the Holy Roman Empire, vote for the last time as the health of the Emperor Francis I declines. The electors (including Britain's King George III, who also rules as Elector of Hanover) approve Francis's son, Prince Joseph of Austria as King of the Romans. Upon the death of Francis in 1765, Prince Joseph becomes the Holy Roman Emperor Joseph II.
- March 31 – A mutual defense treaty between the Russian Empire and the Kingdom of Prussia is signed in Saint Petersburg between representatives of Russia's Empress Catherine the Great and Prussia's King Frederick the Great. By agreement, each nation agrees (for an eight-year period) to commit 10,000 soldiers and 2,000 horses to the defense of the other in case of an attack, and secretly agree to maintain security within the Polish–Lithuanian Commonwealth.
- April 1 – A solar eclipse occurs. On the same day, the undefeated Thoroughbred racehorse Eclipse, named after the event, is foaled at Keats Gore, near East Ilsley in Berkshire.
- April 5 – The Sugar Act is passed in Great Britain.
- April 21 – Residents of French Louisiana are informed for the first time that they will come under Spanish rule as the result of a secret agreement of November 13, 1762 whereby France has ceded all of its North American territory west of the Mississippi River. The Spanish, however, do not take possession until August 17, 1769.
- April 27 – Eight-year-old child prodigy Wolfgang Amadeus Mozart performs a private concert before King George III and Queen Charlotte in Great Britain, and has an encore on May 19.
- May 3 – Baden, one of the member states of the Confederation of Switzerland, declares a policy of remaining neutral in future conflicts, a model that is soon followed by other members of the Confederation and which eventually becomes the basis for Swiss neutrality from 1815 onward.
- June 21 – The English-language Quebec Gazette is established in Quebec City, Canada (the oldest surviving newspaper in North America).
- June 29 – One of the strongest tornadoes ever recorded hits Woldegk, Germany.

=== July–September ===
- July 6 – The last British troops depart Havana, Cuba, two years after having captured it from Spain during the Seven Years' War. The removal of troops follows the treaty between the two Kingdoms, with Spain ceding West Florida to Great Britain in return for the Havana withdrawal.
- July 8 – The Niagara Conference begins at the invitation of Sir William Johnson, the British Superintendent of Indian Affairs for the northern district, who hosts "one of the largest conventions of red men ever held on the continent" to negotiate the end of the hostilities from the French and Indian War. Reportedly, 2,000 representatives of the North American tribes meet at upstate New York coming from distances ranging "From Dakota to Hudson's Bay, and from Maine to Kentucky."
- July 11 – Conditional repatriation of the Acadians in Canada, French colonists who took up arms against the British during the war, is approved by order of King George III on advice of the Privy Council. The Council offers settlement to any Acadians willing to take an oath of allegiance to the British Crown and that those living in New Brunswick are to "be allowed to settle in Nova Scotia, but that they should be dispersed in small numbers in various localities."
- July 20 – King George, on advice of the Privy Council, issues the Royal Determination of the disputed boundary between the colonial provinces of New York and New Hampshire. The King-in-Council "doth hereby order and declare the western banks of the river Connecticut from where it enters the province of Massachusetts Bay, as far north as the 45th degree of north latitude to be the boundary line between the two provinces of New Hampshire and New York."
- July 26 – In what is described 250 years later as "The first documented United States school shooting", a group of four Delaware Indians invade a schoolhouse near what is now Greencastle, Pennsylvania and kill ten schoolchildren and their teacher, Enoch Brown. The massacre happens in the course of Pontiac's War, as retaliation against white settlement of Indian lands in central Pennsylvania. One student, Archie McCullough, manages to escape the carnage; a memorial is erected 120 years later on August 4, 1884.
- July 31 – Johnson arrives at the Niagara River site to meet with the representatives of the Indian nations.
- August 1 – The Treaty of Fort Niagara is signed between Great Britain and 44 North American Indian nations, bring an end to the ongoing war that had started in 1756 with most of the northern Indian tribes. Sir William Johnson appears on behalf of Britain, and principal chiefs appear for the Iroquois Confederacy, Wabash Confederacy, Illini Confederacy, Haudenosaunee, Seneca, Wyandot, Menominee, Algonquin, Nipissing, Ojibwa, Mississaugas, Mohawk, Abenaki, Huron, and Onondaga.
- September 7 – Stanisław August Poniatowski is elected as the King of the Polish–Lithuanian Commonwealth.

=== October–December ===
- October 15 – English scholar Edward Gibbon conceives the idea of writing The History of the Decline and Fall of the Roman Empire, "as I sat musing amid the ruins of the Capitol".
- October 22 – Battle of Buxar: The British East India Company defeats the combined armies of Mir Qasim, the Nawab of Bengal, the Nawab of Awadh, and Mughal Emperor Shah Alam II.
- November 9 – Mary Campbell, a captive of the Lenape during the French and Indian War, is turned over to forces commanded by Colonel Henry Bouquet.
- December 1 – Siege of Darbar Sahib (1764): 30 Sikhs defend the holy site of Golden Temple against 30,000 Afghans.

=== Date unknown ===
- The Royal Colony of North Carolina establishes a new county from the eastern portion of Granville County and names it Bute County for John Stuart, 3rd Earl of Bute, who had recently resigned his post as Prime Minister of Great Britain. In 1779 the State of North Carolina abolishes the county, when it forms Warren County from the northern portion and Franklin County from the southern portion.
- The French government withdraws wartime taxes.
- Catherine the Great establishes the first secondary education school for females in Russia – The Smolny Institute, for girls of the nobility in St. Petersburg.
- Chief Pontiac, participating in an armed conflict with other native tribes against British military, participates in a dialogue and exchange with the military of Britain, resulting eventually in a negotiated peace treaty.
- French Carthusian monks at Grande Chartreuse perfect a commercial recipe for Chartreuse (liqueur).

=== Publications ===
- Cesare Beccaria - On Crimes and Punishments (Dei delitti e delle pene), a founding work of penology
- Immanuel Kant - Observations on the Feeling of the Beautiful and Sublime (Beobachtungen über das Gefühl des Schönen und Erhabenen)
- Voltaire - Dictionnaire philosophique
- Horace Walpole - The Castle of Otranto "a story, translated by William Marshal, Gent., from the original Italian of Onuphrio Muralto", the first Gothic novel

=== January–March ===
- January 23 – Prince Joseph of Austria marries Princess Maria Josepha of Bavaria in Vienna.
- January 29 – One week before his death, Mir Jafar, who had been enthroned as the Nawab of Bengal and ruler of the Bengali people with the support and protection of the British East India Company, abdicates in favor of his 18-year-old son, Najmuddin Ali Khan.
- February 8
  - Frederick the Great, the King of Prussia, issues a decree abolishing the historic punishments against unmarried women in Germany for "sex crimes", particularly the Hurenstrafen (literally "whore shaming") practices of public humiliation.
  - Isaac Barré, a member of the British House of Commons for Wycombe and a veteran of the French and Indian War in the British American colonies, coins the term "Sons of Liberty" in a rebuttal to Charles Townshend's derisive description of the American colonists during the introduction of the proposed Stamp Act. Barré notes that "They fled from your tyranny to a then uncultivated and unhospitable country... And yet, actuated by the principles of true English liberty, they met all these hardships with pleasure, compared with those they suffered in their own country, from the hands of those who should have been their friends." American colonists adopt the term for their own organization after reading the accounts of Barré's speech.
- February 14 – Spain's five-member "special junta", appointed by Prime Minister Jerónimo Grimaldi, delivers its report regarding "ways to address the backwardness of Spain's commerce with its colonies and with foreign nations". The report provides detailed orders to be delivered to José de Gálvez, the visitador general in charge of New Spain.
- March 9 – After a public campaign by the writer Voltaire, judges in Paris posthumously exonerate Jean Calas of murdering his son. Calas had been tortured and executed in 1762 on the charge, though his son may have committed suicide.
- March 22 – Royal assent is given to the Duties in American Colonies Act 1765, historically referred to as the Stamp Act, imposing the first direct tax levied from Great Britain on the thirteen American colonies, effective November 1. The revenue measure (which requires the purchase of a stamp to be affixed for validation of all legal documents, but also to licensed newspapers and even playing cards and dice) is made to help defray the costs for British military operations in North America, including the French and Indian War.
- March 24 – Great Britain passes the Quartering Act, requiring private households in the thirteen American colonies to house British soldiers if necessary.

=== April–June ===
- April 4 – At Fort Tombecbe, near what is now the town of Epes, Alabama, representatives of the British Empire and of the Choctaw Indian tribe in Mississippi sign a peace treaty in the wake of French cession of claims to the British. A boundary is fixed between land to be occupied by the Choctaws and for lands which British settlers can use; in addition, the British agree to provide a police official and a gunsmith at Fort Tombecbe for the Choctaws to use for trespassing complaints and for weapons repairs. By 1775, however, the Choctaws are outnumbered in Mississippi.
- April 5 – After completing the portion of the Mason–Dixon line marking the semi-circular boundary between Pennsylvania and Delaware, English surveyors Charles Mason and Jeremiah Dixon begin the two-and-a-half-year process of plotting out the 230-mile boundary between Pennsylvania and Maryland along the latitude of 39°43′20″ N.
- April 14 – Three days after getting the news that the Stamp Act has passed, American colonists invade the British Army arsenal near the New York City Hall and sabotage guns inside by spiking them.
- April 26 – At Saint Petersburg, German engineer Christian Kratzenstein presents to the Russian Academy of Sciences a perfected version of the arithmetical machine originally invented by Gottfried Leibniz. Kratzenstein claims that his machine solves the problem with the Leibniz machine has with calculations above four digits, perfecting the flaw where the machine is "prone to err whenever it is necessary to make a number of 9999 move to 10000", but the machine is not developed further.
- May 18 – Not long after British rule has started over the formerly French colony of Quebec, an accidental fire destroys one quarter of the town of Montreal.
- May 26 – During a stroll in the park "on a fine Sabbath afternoon" at Glasgow Green, Scottish engineer James Watt receives the inspiration that provides the breakthrough in his development of the steam engine; he recounts later that "The idea came into my mind, that as steam was an elastic body it would rush into a vacuum, and if a communication was made between the cylinder and an exhausted vessel, it would rush into it, and might be there condensed without cooling the cylinder... I had not walked further than the Golf-house when the whole thing was arranged in my mind."
- June 21 – The Isle of Man is brought under British control, the Isle of Man Purchase Act (coming into force 10 May) confirming HM Treasury's purchase of the feudal rights of the Dukes of Atholl, as Lord of Mann over the island, and revesting them into the British Crown.

=== July–December ===
- July 10 – King George III dismisses George Grenville from the office of Prime Minister of Great Britain, and replaces him with another Whig Party statesman, Charles Watson-Wentworth, Lord Rockingham.
- July 12 – On orders of Chief Pontiac, War Chief Wahpesah of the Kickapoo people releases British Indian Affairs negotiator George Croghan from 35 days of detention. At the same time, Pontiac authorizes a Shawnee Chief, Nanicksah, to sign a treaty with the British on behalf of the Great Lakes tribes, settling the French and Indian War.
- July 13 – Qianlong, the Emperor of China issues a decree that copper engravings be made to depict all of his victories in battle. In the interest of amity with the Chinese, King George III of Great Britain gives priority to the sale of British copper, and King Louis XV of France assents to the use of French artisans.
- July 21 – Having eliminated all of his rivals for leadership of Persia, Karim Khan Zand returns in triumph to his home in Shiraz and makes it his capital then begins construction of citadels, mosques, schools and other buildings.
- July 23 – Headed by Odawa Chief Pontiac and George Croghan, a party of Great Lakes tribesmen and British soldiers travel along the Wabash River and obtain the release of all white prisoners of war remaining in the Miami people and Odawa villages between Ouiatenon (near modern-day Granville, Indiana) and Detroit.
- July 30 – At Yale College, eight students attack the residence of Yale's President Thomas Clap because of his promotion of "New Light" Calvinist doctrine; and "with Evil Intent" and "with Strong hand burst and take off the gates of the yard of the mansion house and Carry away and with Screaming and Shouting... throw into said House Numbers of large stones with Cattles Horns into the windows of said House." The students plead guilty and pay nominal fines, and Clap resigns at the end of the 1765–66 school year.
- August 9 – Russian Empress Catherine II issues a decree authorizing the new way to produce vodka (by freezing).

Map of India in 1765 showing territories loyal to the Marathas (yellow); and the territories of those loyal to the Great Mogul (green)

- August 14 – In protest of the Stamp Act, Bostonians attack the home of official Andrew Oliver.
- August 16 – The Treaty of Allahabad is signed. The Treaty marks the political and constitutional involvement and the beginning of Company rule in India.
- August 18 – Joseph II becomes Holy Roman Emperor.
- August 26 – In protest of the Stamp Act, Bostonians destroy the home of lieutenant governor Thomas Hutchinson.
- September 6 – Jean-Jacques Rousseau's house in Switzerland is stoned by a mob.
- September 21 – François Antoine announces he has killed the Beast of Gévaudan.
- October 17 – The Pennsylvania Gazette reports that a Mr. McCullough, the Distributor of Stamps for the Royal Colony of North Carolina, has resigned his post in protest at the Stamp Act. A Dr. Huston is appointed to the position.
- November 1 – The Stamp Act goes into effect in the thirteen American colonies.
- December 12 – The Pennsylvania Gazette reports that Dr. Huston, the recently instated Distributor of Stamps for the Royal Colony of North Carolina, has resigned his post in protest at the Stamp Act.

=== Date unknown ===
- The first chocolate factory in the Thirteen Colonies is established by Dr. James Baker at Dorchester, Massachusetts.
- It is believed that the first true restaurant opens in Paris, where a tavern-keeper named Boulanger sells cooked dishes at an all-night place on the Rue Bailleul.
- In Lisbon, the auto-da-fé parade (often an excuse for violence against Jews or Christian 'heretics') is abolished.
- Desai Atash Behram is established in Navsari, India.
- Catherine the Great establishes the first secondary education school for non-noble females in Russia: the Novodevichii Institute, for the daughters of commoners.

=== January–March ===
- January 1 – Charles Edward Stuart ("Bonnie Prince Charlie") becomes the new Stuart claimant to the throne of Great Britain, as King Charles III, and figurehead for Jacobitism.
- January 14 – Christian VII becomes King of Denmark-Norway.
- January 20 – Burmese–Siamese War: Outside of the walls of the Thailand capital of Ayutthaya, tens of thousands of invaders from Burma (under the command of General Ne Myo Thihapate and General Maha Nawatra) are confronted by Thai defenders led by General Phya Taksin. The defenders are overwhelmed and the survivors take refuge inside Ayutthaya. The siege continues for 15 months before the Burmese attackers collapse the walls by digging tunnels and setting fire to debris. The city falls on April 9, 1767, and King Ekkathat is killed.
- February 5 – An observer in Wilmington, North Carolina reports to the Edinburgh newspaper Caledonian Mercury that three ships have been seized by British men-of-war, on the charge of carrying official documents without stamps. The strict enforcement causes seven other ships to leave Wilmington for other ports.
- February 13 – John Mills is elected a Fellow of the Royal Society, with Benjamin Franklin as one of his sponsors.
- February 15 – Protesting against the Stamp Act 1765, members of the New York City Sons of Liberty travel to Pennsylvania and set fire to a British supply of tax stamps before the stamps can be taken to distributors in the province of Maryland.
- February 18 – Meermin Slave Mutiny: Captive Malagasy people seize a Dutch East India Company slave ship in the Indian Ocean.
- February 20 – The Pennsylvania Gazette reports that a British sloop off Wilmington, North Carolina, has seized a sloop sailing from Philadelphia, and another sailing from Saint Christopher, on the charge of carrying official documents without stamps. In response, local residents threaten to burn a Royal Man-of-War attempting to deliver stamps to Wilmington, forcing the ship to return to the mouth of the Cape Fear River.
- February 23 – Lorraine and Bar become French again, on the death of Stanisław Leszczyński, King of Poland and last Duke of Lorraine.
- February – Ferocious wolf attacks occur in France, such as the Beast of Gévaudan or Wolves of Périgord.
- March 5 – Antonio de Ulloa, the first Spanish governor of Louisiana, arrives in New Orleans.
- March 18 – American Revolution: The British Parliament repeals the Stamp Act, which has been very unpopular in the British colonies; the persuasion of Benjamin Franklin is considered partly responsible. The Declaratory Act asserts the right of Britain to bind the colonies in all other respects.

=== April–June ===
- April 3 – Seventeen days after the Stamp Act's repeal in London, news reaches America of the decision.
- April 9
  - African slaves are imported directly into the American colony of Georgia for the first time, as the sloop Mary Brow arrives in Savannah with 78 captives imported from Saint-Louis, Senegal.
  - American botanist John Bartram completes his first exploration and cataloging of North American plants after more than nine months.
- April 17 – King Carlos III of Spain issues a royal cédula from Aranjuez to round up all ethnic Chinese in the Philippines and to move them to ghettoes in various provinces.
- May 29 – In a paper read to the Royal Society, British theoretical chemist Henry Cavendish first describes his process of producing what he refers to as "inflammable air" by dissolving base metals such as iron, zinc and tin in a flask of sulfuric acid or hydrochloric acid, drawing the conclusion that the vapor that was released is different from air. Seven years later, French chemist Antoine Lavoisier bestows the name "hydrogen" on the gas.
- May 30 – The Theatre Royal, Bristol, opens in England. Also this year in England, the surviving Georgian Theatre (Stockton-on-Tees) opens as a playhouse.
- June 4 – On the occasion of the 28th birthday of King George III, members of the Sons of Liberty in Manhattan erect a liberty pole as a protest for the first time. The historic symbol, a tall "wooden pole with a Phrygian cap" is placed "on the Fields somewhere between Broadway and Park Row". British soldiers cut down the pole in August.

=== July–September ===
- July 1 – François-Jean de la Barre, a young French nobleman, is tortured and beheaded, before his body is burnt on a pyre, along with a copy of Voltaire's Dictionnaire philosophique nailed to his torso, supposedly for the crime of not saluting a Roman Catholic religious procession in Abbeville, and for other sacrileges, including desecrating a crucifix.
- August 10 – During the occupation of New York, members of the 28th Foot Regiment of the British Army chop down the liberty pole that was erected by the Sons of Liberty on June 4. The Sons of Liberty put up a second pole the next day, and that pole is cut down on August 22.
- August 13 – A hurricane sweeps across the French island colony of Martinique, killing more than 400 people and destroying the plantation owned by Joseph-Gaspard de La Pagerie, the father of the future French Empress Joséphine.
- September 1 – The revolt in Quito (at this time part of Spain's Viceroyalty of Nueva Granada; the modern-day capital of Ecuador) is ended peacefully as royal forces enter the city under the command of Guayaquil Governor Pedro Zelaya. Rather than seeking retribution from the Quito citizens over their insurrection that has broken the monopoly over the sale of the liquor aguardiente, Zeleaya oversees a program of reconciliation.
- September 13 – The position of Patriarch of the Serbs, established on April 9, 1346 as the authority over the Serbian Orthodox Church, is abolished by order of Sultan Mustafa III of the Ottoman Empire; the patriarchate is not re-established until 1920 following the creation of Yugoslavia at the end of World War One.
- September 23 – John Penn, the Colonial Governor of Pennsylvania and one of the four Penn family owners of the Pennsylvania land grant, issues a proclamation forbidding British American colonist residents from building settlements on lands in the west "not yet purchased of the Nations" of the Iroquois Indians.

=== October–December ===
- October 1 – Crown Prince Gustav of Sweden weds Princess Sophia Magdalena of Denmark. They become King Gustav III and Queen Consort Sophia of Sweden upon his ascension to the throne in 1771.
- October 4 – The kingdom of France formally cedes its rights to the Malouines Islands to Spain. On March 24, Spain renames the islands the Malvinas, and in 1833, the United Kingdom re-colonises the recently abandoned territory and renames it the Falkland Islands.
- November – Raja Lumu consolidates his claim to the Selangor Sultanate by marriage to the niece of the Sultan of Perak.
- November 10 – The last Colonial governor of New Jersey, William Franklin, signs the charter of Queen's College (later renamed Rutgers University).
- November 27 – A British sloop-of-war is searching all vessels passing near Cape Lookout, North Carolina, and some vessels have been seized, according to an observer in New York City, in the Province of New York, reporting to the Pennsylvania Gazette.
- November 29 – Wolfgang Amadeus Mozart returns to Salzburg, after the Mozart family grand tour of Europe.
- December 2 – The Law on the Freedom of Printing abolishes censorship in Sweden and guarantees freedom of the press, making Sweden the first country of the world to introduce constitutional protection of press freedom, and to pass wide-ranging freedom of information legislation.
- December 5 – James Christie holds the first sale at Christie's auction house in London.
- December 25 – Mapuches in Chile launch a series of surprise attacks against the Spanish starting the Mapuche uprising of 1766.

=== Date unknown ===
- Childsburgh, the Orange County, North Carolina seat laid out as Corbin Town in 1754, and renamed in 1759, is renamed Hillsborough, in honor of Wills Hill, 1st Marquess of Downshire, Earl of Hillsborough.

=== January–March ===
- January 1 – The first annual volume of The Nautical Almanac and Astronomical Ephemeris, produced by British Astronomer Royal Nevil Maskelyne at the Royal Observatory, Greenwich, gives navigators the means to find longitude at sea, using tables of lunar distance.
- January 9 – William Tryon, governor of the Royal Colony of North Carolina, signs a contract with architect John Hawks to build Tryon Palace, a lavish Georgian style governor's mansion on the New Bern waterfront.
- February 16 – On orders from head of state Pasquale Paoli of the newly independent Republic of Corsica, a contingent of about 200 Corsican soldiers begins an invasion of the small island of Capraia off of the coast of northern Italy and territory of the Republic of Genoa. By May 31, the island is conquered as its defenders surrender.
- February 19 – The Earl of Shelburne, British Secretary of State for the Southern Department (which has jurisdiction over Britain's American colonies) fires the unpopular Governor of West Florida, George Johnstone, and summons him back to London.
- February 27 – King Carlos III of Spain issues a decree expelling the Jesuits from the dominions of the Spanish Empire worldwide.
- March 13 – British Chancellor of the Exchequer Charles Townshend, having already pushed through the unpopular Townshend Acts to recoup war expenses from Britain's American colonies, presents a comprehensive plan for more taxes in a closed door session of the House of Commons, with most proposals passed within a month.
- March 14 – Antonio de Ulloa, the Colonial Governor of Spanish Louisiana (Luisiana), dispatches Captain Francisco Ríu y Morales up the Mississippi River to establish two forts, one at San Luis (now St. Louis, Missouri) and to set up a colony for displaced French-speaking Acadians and protect shipping on the river.
- March 24 – Spain acquires control of what are now called the Falkland Islands from France, compensating French Admiral Louis Antoine de Bougainville for the money spent on the construction of the settlement at Fort Saint Louis. The islands, named les Îles Malouines by the French, are renamed las Islas Malvinas by the Spanish, and Fort Saint Louis is renamed as Puerto Soledad. In 1816, Argentina declares independence from Spain and takes the Malvinas; and in 1833, Britain's Royal Navy captures the islands from the Argentines and renames them the Falklands, and renames Puerto Soledad as Port Louis.
- March 31 – Enforcement begins of the February 27 decree by King Carlos III of Spain, ordering the suppression of the Society of Jesus (the Jesuits) in the colonies in Spanish America. Over the next few months approximately 2,200 Jesuit priests and missionaries are deported.

=== April–June ===
- April 2 – Suppression of the Jesuits begins, in the Spanish Empire and Kingdom of Naples.
- April 7 – Troops of the Burmese Konbaung dynasty sack the Siamese city of Ayutthaya, ending the Burmese–Siamese War (1765–1767) after 15 months, and bringing the four-century-old Ayutthaya Kingdom to an end. King Ekkathat is found dead inside the city walls on April 9.
- May 3 – A fleet of ships from the Republic of Genoa arrives at Capraia and sends 150 men ashore to drive out the Corsicans, but the outnumbered Genoese marines are "quickly cut to pieces".
- May 10 – Sir William Johnson, 1st Baronet, acting on behalf of Great Britain, meets with representatives of the Six Nations of the Iroquois Confederacy at German Flatts, New York, opening negotiations on the boundary between the New York colony and the Native Americans, eventually concluded by the Treaty of Fort Stanwix.
- May 16 – Ahmed al-Ghazzal, the emissary from Sultan Mohammed ben Abdallah of Morocco to the Spanish Empire, makes a triumphant return to Marrakesh with almost 300 Muslims who had been held captive in Spain, as well as sacred Islamic manuscripts that had been seized by the Spanish in 1612. The negotiation of the release had started with al-Ghazzal's meeting with Spain's King Carlos III on August 21, 1766.
- May 31 – The Genoese island of Capraia is conquered by the Corsican Army after a ten-week campaign.
- June 17 – British Royal Navy Captain Samuel Wallis becomes the first European to visit the island of Tahiti in the Pacific Ocean, during HMS Dolphin's second circumnavigation; he also sights Mehetia.

=== July–September ===
- July 3
  - Pitcairn Island in the Pacific Ocean is sighted from HMS Swallow, by 15-year-old Midshipman Robert Pitcairn, on a British Royal Navy expeditionary voyage commanded by Philip Carteret, the first definite European sighting.
  - Norway's oldest newspaper still in print, Adresseavisen, is first published.
- August 26 – Construction begins on Tryon Palace in New Bern, North Carolina. The construction proves more expensive than initially expected, leading the government to increase local taxes. This stirs resentment among some North Carolinians, and helps prolong the War of the Regulation.
- September 29 – The Spanish Empire's Governorate of the Río de la Plata and Governorate of Paraguay begin the process of expulsion of the 456 members of the Society of Jesus (the Jesuits) from southern South America, placing them on five ships bound for Spain.

=== October –December ===
- October 7 – Frederick North, Lord North becomes the new British Chancellor of the Exchequer after the sudden death of Charles Townshend.
- October 9 – Surveying of the "Mason–Dixon line", which will later become the traditional division between the northern and southern states of the United States, is completed by Charles Mason and Jeremiah Dixon after four years, initially to settle a boundary dispute between the colonies of Delaware, Pennsylvania and Maryland. The survey party is halted at Dunkard Creek when a chief of the Mohawk Indians tells them that they are in Native American territory and that the Mohawks guiding the property "would not proceed one step further Westward"; the line, slightly west the 80th meridian west, is now part of the boundary between Pennsylvania and West Virginia.
- October 12 – At the Foundling Hospital in London, Dr. William Watson becomes the first physician to conduct a controlled clinical trial, selecting 32 boys and girls of similar age who have not yet had smallpox. He divides them into three groups in order to test treatments before inoculation for smallpox, with one group receiving a mixture of mercury and jalap, another senna glycoside, and the third getting no pre-treatment at all.
- October 17 – Šćepan Mali, nicknamed "Stephen the Little", is selected as the legislature at Podgorica to be the Tsar of Montenegro, representing "a short but an important break in the succession of the Petrovic dynasty".
- October 24 – In France, several anti-Jewish regulations in place since October 12, 1661, are repealed by the King's Council that advises Louis XV. While Jewish merchants are still prohibited from owning their own retail stores, they are allowed to sell merchandise on credit to gentile merchants at legal interest rates, to legally enforce debts, and to sell jewelry.
- October 28 – A boycott, of 38 types of goods imported from England, is resolved by Boston merchants meeting at Faneuil Hall as a response to the taxes imposed by Great Britain, and one of the first "Buy American" campaigns is started in order to encourage the purchase of items manufactured and produced in the 13 colonies. Copies of the agreement, to be signed by participating merchants, are circulated beyond the Province of Massachusetts Bay to other colonial provinces in New England.
- November 1 – Scottish-born American merchant and shipowner Andrew Sprowle of Portsmouth, Virginia, establishes the Gosport Shipyard on the western shore of the Elizabeth River in the Virginia Colony, on the site of what will eventually become the Norfolk Naval Shipyard.
- November 3 – King Ferdinand IV of the Spanish dominated Kingdom of Naples follows Spain's lead and orders the expulsion of the Jesuits from Naples and has them marched northward to the Neapolitan border with the Papal States.
- November 4 – Francisco de Paula Bucareli, the Governor of Buenos Aires (at the time, a province within the Spanish Empire's Viceroyalty of Peru), hosts the caciques who are the Guarani chiefs of the 30 mission towns established by Jesuit missionaries, in an effort to gain Guarani peoples' support in the expulsion of the Jesuits.
- November 9 – At the new King's College medical school in New York City (later the Columbia University College of Physicians and Surgeons), Dr. John Jones gives the first lecture by a surgical professor in North America.
- November 14 – The Timucua Indian tribe, native to central Florida, becomes extinct with the death of the last speaker of the Timucuan language, Juan Alonso Cabale. Eight years earlier, the last 95 surviving Timucuan people had been forcibly relocated by the Spanish colonial government to Guanabacoa, a township in western Cuba.
- November 19 – Under the coercion of Russian occupation armies, the legislature of Poland follows the wishes of Russian Minister Nicholas Repnin and agrees to allow the kingdom to become a Russian protectorate.
- November 20 – The new American Colonies Act 1766, commonly called the "Declaratory Act", goes into effect, virtually providing for Great Britain's Parliament to govern lawmaking in 13 colonies and exacerbating tensions there.
- November 27 – Oconostota and Attakullakulla, Chiefs of the Cherokee people in the Carolinas, depart from Charleston, South Carolina on a ship voyage to New York City, where they are welcomed by British colonial officials as a prelude to negotiations with Britain's Superintendent of Indian Affairs, Sir William Johnson.
- November 29 – The Archduchess Maria Theresa of Austria, in her capacity as Queen of Hungary, issues an edict against the Romani people (commonly called the "gypsies"), prohibiting them from marrying and calling for gypsy children to be taken away by the government so that they can be brought up by Christian families, a proclamation that "produced little or no effect in comparison with the trouble involved".
- December 2 – Future Pennsylvania chief executive John Dickinson begins publishing his revolutionary "Letters from a Farmer in Pennsylvania" in the Pennsylvania Chronicle.
- December 28 – Phraya Taksin, a minor provincial official in Siam (now Thailand), crowns himself as King of Siam, establishing the Siamese Thonburi Kingdom, taking the regnal name of Borommaracha IV and begins a 14-year reign of liberation and conquest; historically, he is known as "Taksin the Great".
- December 29 – Oconostota and Attakullakulla arrive at Johnstown, New York where they, along with leaders of the Six Nations of the Iroquois Confederacy (the Mohawk, Onondaga, Oneida, Cayuga, Seneca and Tuscarora tribal nations) meet with Sir William Johnson to begin peace negotiations with the British Empire.

=== January–March ===
- January 9 – Philip Astley stages the first modern circus, with acrobats on galloping horses, in London.
- February 11 – Samuel Adams's circular letter is issued by the Massachusetts House of Representatives, and sent to the other Thirteen Colonies. Refusal to revoke the letter will result in dissolution of the Massachusetts Assembly, and (from October) incur the institution of martial law to prevent civil unrest.
- February 24 – With Russian troops occupying the nation, opposition legislators of the national legislature having been deported, the government of Poland signs a treaty virtually turning the Polish–Lithuanian Commonwealth into a protectorate of the Russian Empire.
- February 27 – The first Secretary of State for the Colonies is appointed in Britain, the Earl of Hillsborough.
- February 29 – Five days after the signing of the treaty, a group of the szlachta, Polish nobles, establishes the Bar Confederation, to defend the internal and external independence of the Polish–Lithuanian Commonwealth against Russian influence, and against King Stanisław August Poniatowski.
- March 1 – King Louis XV decrees that all cities and towns in France will be required to post house numbering on all residential buildings, primarily to facilitate the forced quartering of troops in citizens' homes.
- March 17
  - Britain's Superintendent of Indian Affairs, Sir William Johnson, concludes a peace agreement with the leaders of the Six Nations of the Iroquois Confederacy (the Mohawk, Onondaga, Oneida, Cayuga, Seneca and Tuscarora tribal nations) of the northern American lands, and with Chiefs Oconostota and Attakullakulla of the Cherokee nation in the southern American lands.
  - Prithvi Singh begins a reign of 10 years as the new Raja of Jaipur (part of the modern-day Indian state of Rajasthan), 12 days after the death of Madho Singh.
- March 27 – Catherine the Great of Russia dispatches troops under General Pyotr Krechetnikov to intervene in a civil war in Poland, at the request of Poland's King Stanisław August Poniatowski, a move that will ultimately lead to the Partitions of Poland.

=== April–June ===
- April 4 – The Cotopaxi volcano erupts in what is now Ecuador, at the time part of the Spanish Viceroyalty of Nueva Granada, covering the towns of Hambato and Tacunga with ash, but not causing fatalities.
- April 5 – The New York Chamber of Commerce, first of its kind in the American colonies, is founded by 20 New York merchants at Bolton and Sigel's Tavern at 54 Pearl Street in New York City. Former New York City mayor John Cruger Jr. is elected the Chamber's first president.
- May 10 – Massacre of St George's Fields: John Wilkes is imprisoned for writing an article for The North Briton, severely criticising King George III. This action provokes protesters to riot; in the Southwark district of London, troops fire on the mob, killing seven.
- May 15 – After the Treaty of Versailles, the island of Corsica is ceded by Genoa to France.
- June 14 – The largest mass meeting ever held in New England, up to this time, takes place at the Old South Church to support a petition demanding that the British remove a ship which has been hindering navigation in Boston Harbor.
- June 20 – Russo-Turkish War (1768–1774): Russia captures the fortress of Bar.

=== July–September ===
- July 1–3 – Louis Antoine de Bougainville, on his circumnavigation westbound, sails through the Bougainville Strait and along the north shore of Bougainville Island in the Solomons.
- July 14 – The massacre of Polish people (most likely by the Russians) at the village of Balta, now a part of Ukraine but at the time an Ottoman Empire town on the frontier with Poland, leads to the Russo-Turkish War.
- July 18 – "The Liberty Song", the first American patriotic song, is published in the Boston Gazette and includes the refrain "In freedom we're born".
- July 25 – The Imperial Court of China's Emperor Qianlong and his three senior grand councilors, Fuheng, Yenjisan and Liu T'ung-hsun, issues a directive to officials in the Zhejiang, Jiangsu and Shandong provinces warning them about the need to respond to rumors of sorcery.
- August 7 – The palace of the Ottoman Grand Vizier is destroyed by a fire in Constantinople
- August 26 – James Cook departs from Plymouth aboard HMS Endeavour on his first voyage of discovery.
- August 27 – Almost all merchants and traders in the British colony of New York sign a pact not to import British manufactured goods as long as the Townshend Acts are in effect, nor to do business with nonassociators to the pact.
- August 30 – A fire burns much of the Library of the Vatican.
- September 16 – Louis XV appoints René de Maupeou as Grand Chancellor of France (an office he will hold until 1790), and orders him to crush the judicial opposition.
- September 22–29 – The Massachusetts Convention of Towns, assembling in Boston, resolves on a written objection to the impending arrival of British troops rather than more militant action but causes panic in London.

=== October–December ===
- October 1 – The British Army's 29th Infantry Regiment of foot soldiers, which will carry out the Boston Massacre on March 5, 1770, arrives in Boston Harbor along with three other regiments. The 700 foot soldiers march through the Massachusetts colony's capital as a show of force and begin their occupation. Within a year, there will be "nearly 4,000 armed redcoats in the crowded seaport of 15,000 inhabitants."
- October 4 – The Sultan Mustafa III of the Ottoman Empire begins the Russo-Turkish War after the Russians refuse to withdraw troops from Poland.
- October 14 – William Pitt resigns from his position as Prime Minister of Great Britain.
- October 15 – A powerful hurricane sweeps across Cuba during the Festival of Santa Teresa, killing hundreds of people. Spain's King Carlos III begins a precedent of ordering the colonial government to fund disaster relief, a task previously left to the Catholic Church.
- October 17 – Representatives of the Cherokee nation sign the Treaty of Hard Labour with British representative John Stuart and relinquish all claims to the land between the Ohio River and the Allegheny Mountains, now the United States state of West Virginia.
- October 29 – French colonists in Louisiana refuse to accept the colony's acquisition by Spain and begin an uprising that forces Spanish Governor Antonio de Ulloa to flee.
- November 5 – The Treaty of Fort Stanwix is signed between the five nations of the Iroquois Confederacy (the Mohawk, Onondaga, Oneida, Cayuga, and Seneca) relinquishing their claims to territory south of the Ohio River to the British.
- December 1 – The slave ship Fredensborg sinks off Tromøya, Norway.
- December 10
  - The Royal Academy is founded in London, with Joshua Reynolds as its first President.
  - The first of the weekly numbers of the Encyclopædia Britannica, edited by William Smellie, are published in Edinburgh; one hundred are planned.
- December 15 – The king's refusal to sign state documents results in the December Crisis (1768) in Sweden.
- December 21 – King Prithvi Narayan Shah unifies several small kingdoms to establish modern-day Nepal; this dynasty will end in 2008.

=== Date unknown ===
- The Petit Trianon, originally designed for Madame de Pompadour, is completed in the park of the Palace of Versailles, and inaugurated by Louis XV.
- New Smyrna, Florida, the largest attempt at colonization by the British in the New World, is founded by Dr. Andrew Turnbull.
- The Steller's sea cow, discovered on Bering Island in 1741, is driven to extinction.
- The Complete Farmer: Or, a General Dictionary of Husbandry, written by "A Society of Gentlemen", a group of members of the Society for the Encouragement of Arts in Britain, concludes publication in weekly numbers and is first published in book form.

=== January–March ===
- February 2 – Pope Clement XIII dies, the night before preparing an order to dissolve the Jesuits.
- February 17 – The British House of Commons votes not to allow MP John Wilkes to take his seat after he wins a by-election, on the grounds that he was an outlaw when standing.
- March 4 – Mozart departs Italy, after the last of his three tours there.
- March 16 – Louis Antoine de Bougainville returns to Saint-Malo, following a three-year circumnavigation of the world with the ships Boudeuse and Étoile, with the loss of only seven out of 330 men; among the members of the expedition is Jeanne Baré, the first woman known to have circumnavigated the globe. She returns to France some time after Bougainville and his ships.

=== April–June ===
- April 13 – James Cook arrives in Tahiti, on the ship HM Bark Endeavour, preparing for the 1769 Transit of Venus observed from Tahiti on June 3. After the voyage, the data is found to be inaccurate in determining the distance between the Sun and Earth.
- April 29 – Scottish inventor James Watt is granted a British patent for "A method of lessening the consumption of steam in steam engines" – the separate condenser, a key improvement (first devised by Watt in 1765) and the basis for the Watt steam engine which stimulates the Industrial Revolution.
- May 9 – France conquers Corsica, ending the Corsican War of Independence.
- May 14 – Charles III of Spain sends Spanish missionaries, who found California missions in San Diego, Santa Barbara, San Francisco and Monterey, and begin the settlement of California.
- May 19 – Cardinal Giovanni Vincenzo Antonio Ganganelli is elected as the 249th pope, succeeding the late Clement XIII and choosing to take the regnal name of Pope Clement XIV.
- June 3 – A transit of Venus is followed five hours later by a total solar eclipse, the shortest such interval in historical times. The transit is viewed by King George III of Great Britain, at the Kew Observatory.
- June 7 – Frontiersman Daniel Boone first begins to explore modern-day Kentucky.

=== July–September ===
- July 3 – Richard Arkwright patents a spinning frame in England, able to spin threads mechanically.
- July 16 – Father Junípero Serra founds Mission San Diego de Alcalá, the first of the 21 California missions.
- July 20 – Recently appointed as the Governor of Spanish Louisiana, Irish-born soldier of fortune Alejandro O'Reilly sails into the French fort of La Balize with 21 Spanish ships, along with 2,056 soldiers, cannons and ammunition, and informs French Louisiana Governor Charles Philippe Aubry of his royal commission to take Louisiana on behalf of the King of Spain.
- August 3 – The party of Gaspar de Portolà becomes the first white group to set foot in the area now known as Santa Monica, California.
- August 18 – Brescia Explosion: The city of Brescia, Italy is devastated when the Church of San Nazaro is struck by lightning. The resulting fire ignites 200,000 lb (90,000 kg) of gunpowder being stored there, causing a massive explosion, which destroys 1/6 of the city and kills 3,000 people.
- September – Massive droughts in Bengal lead to the Bengal famine of 1770, in which ten million people, a third of the population, will die, the worst natural disaster in human history (in terms of lives lost).
- September 6–9 – David Garrick holds a Shakespeare Jubilee festival at Stratford-upon-Avon in England.
- September 10 – Russo-Turkish War (1768–1774): Russian forces take the Ottoman fortress of Chocim in Bukovina.

=== October–December ===
- October 1 – James Cook names White Island, off the coast of New Zealand.
- October 7 – James Cook lands in New Zealand, at Poverty Bay.
- October 9 – In the first encounter between the Māori people and Europeans (at the future site of Gisborne, New Zealand), one Maori is shot and killed after he steals a sword from one of the officers of the Cook expedition. Several more Māori are killed in fighting the next day.
- October 23 – Nicolas-Joseph Cugnot demonstrates a steam-powered artillery tractor (see drawing) in France.
- November 1 – A party of the expedition of Spanish explorer Gaspar de Portola becomes the first Europeans to reach San Francisco Bay. Sergeant Jose Francisco de Ortega and his group accidentally discover the area while searching for Drakes Bay in Alta California.
- November 12 –The Gorkhali Army conquer the last standing Malla Kingdom of Bhaktapur marking the end of The Malla dynasty in Nepal.
- November 21 – Ireland's House of Commons rejects a spending bill passed by Great Britain's parliament, by a 94–71 margin.
- December 13 – Dartmouth College is established in Hanover, New Hampshire, as John Wentworth, the Royal Governor, conveys a charter from King George III of Great Britain.
- December 22 – The Sino-Burmese War (1765–69) is ended by a truce.

=== Date unknown ===
- The Authorized King James Version of the Bible is published in England in the Oxford standard text, edited by Benjamin Blayney.
- First recorded use of 'literally' as a metaphorical intensifier.

== Births ==
1760

- January 11 – Zofia Potocka, Greek slave courtesan, agent for Russia and Polish noble (d. 1822)
- March 1 – François Nicolas Leonard Buzot, French Revolutionary leader (suicide 1794)
- March 5 – Marie-Adélaïde de La Touche-Limouzinière, French aristocrat, counter-revolutionary and combatant in the War of the Vendée (d. 1794)
- March 10 – Leandro Fernández de Moratín, Spanish dramatist, translator and neoclassical poet (d. 1828)
- March 28 – Thomas Clarkson, English abolitionist (d. 1846)
- April 16 – Sigismund Friedrich Hermbstädt, German pharmacist, chemist (d. 1833)
- April 30 – Joseph Souham, French general (d. 1837)
- May 10 – Johann Peter Hebel, German poet (d. 1826)
- May 28 – Alexandre, Vicomte de Beauharnais, French politician, general (d. 1794)
- May 29 – Charlotte Slottsberg, Swedish ballerina (d. 1800)
- June 12 – Jean-Baptiste Louvet de Couvrai, French novelist, playwright, journalist, politician and diplomat (d. 1797)
- June 16 – Louise Contat, French actress (d. 1813)
- July 13 – István Pauli (Pável), Hungarian Slovene priest, writer (d. 1829)
- August 3 – Jacques Réattu, French artist 9d. (1833)
- August 22 – Pope Leo XII, (b. Annibale Francesco Clemente Melchiore Girolamo Nicola Sermattei della Genga), Italian priest (d. 1829)
- September 14 – Luigi Cherubini, Italian composer (d. 1842)
- September 21 – Olof Swartz, Swedish botanist (d. 1818)
- September 30 – Michele Cachia, Maltese architect and military engineer (d. 1839)
- October 7 (bapt.) – Fredrica Löf, Swedish actress (d. 1813)
- October 17 – Claude Henri de Rouvroy, comte de Saint-Simon, French economist, political theorist (d. 1825)
- October 27 – August von Gneisenau, Prussian field marshal (d. 1831)
- October 31? – Hokusai, born Katsushika Tokitarō, Japanese Edo period artist, ukiyo-e painter and printmaker (died 1849)

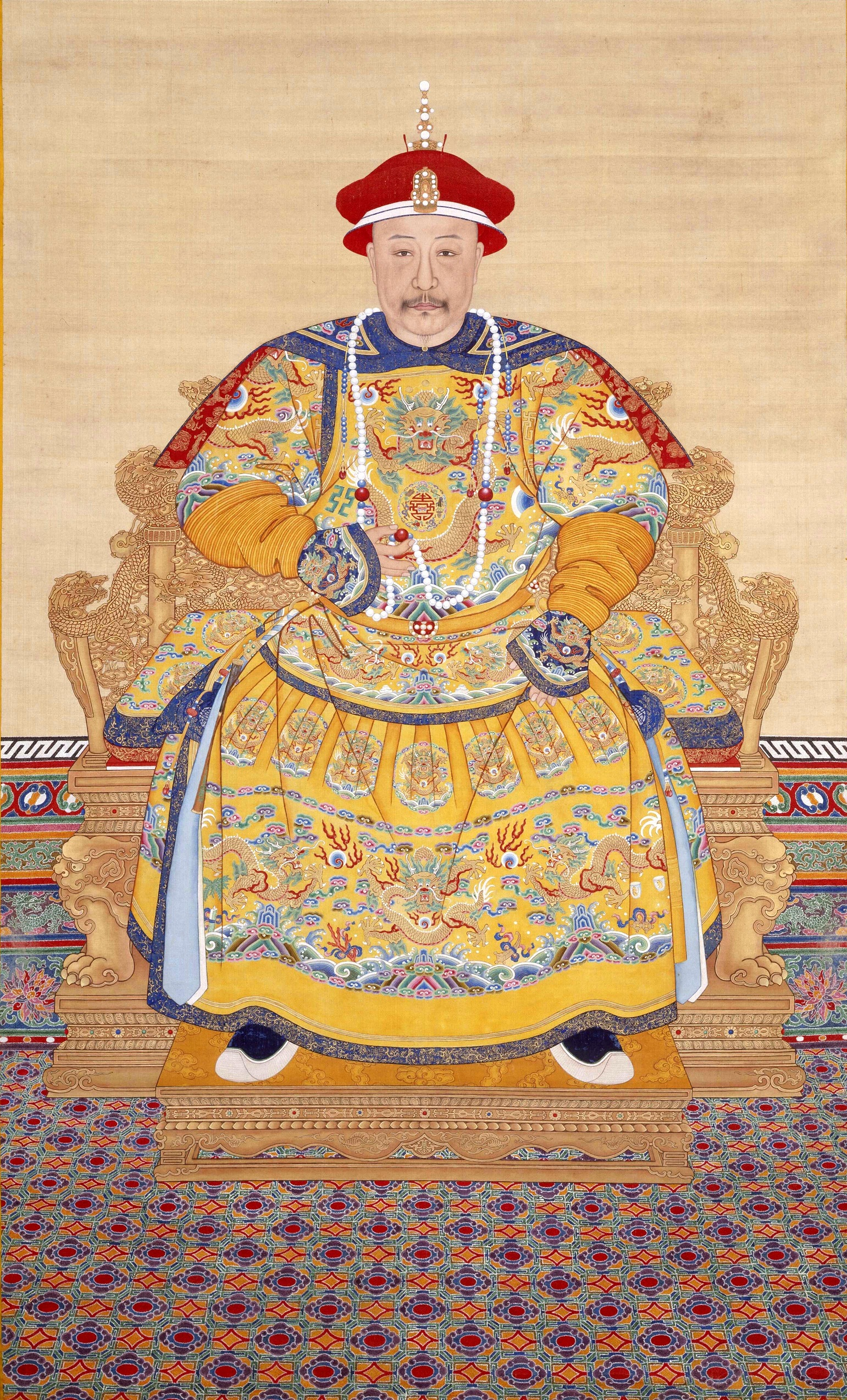
Jiaqing Emperor

- November 13 – Jiaqing Emperor of China (d. 1820)
- November 21 – Joseph Plumb Martin, American Revolutionary soldier and narrative author (d. 1850)
- November 24 – Fabian Wrede, Swedish field marshal (d. 1824)
- November 28 – Maria Teresa Poniatowska, Polish noblewoman (d. 1834)
- December 17 – Deborah Sampson, first American female soldier (d. 1827)
- date unknown
  - Adam Gillies, Lord Gillies, Scottish judge (d. 1842)
  - Emma Jane Greenland, English painter, writer, singer (d. 1843)
  - Clelia Durazzo Grimaldi, Italian botanist (d. 1830)
  - Moscho Tzavela, Greek-Souliote heroine (d. 1803)
- probable date – Lemuel Francis Abbott, English portrait painter (d. 1802)

1761

- January 17 – James Hall, Scottish geologist (d. 1832)
- February 1 – Christian Hendrik Persoon, South African mycologist (d. 1836)
- February 3 – Dorothea von Medem, Latvian diplomat, duchess of Courland (d. 1821)
- February 16 – Charles Pichegru, French general (d. 1804)
- February 22 – Erik Tulindberg, Finnish composer (d. 1814)
- March 6 – Antoine-Francois Andreossy, French general (d. 1828)
- May 3 – August von Kotzebue, German dramatist (d. 1819)
- June 3 – Henry Shrapnel, British Army officer and inventor (d. 1842)

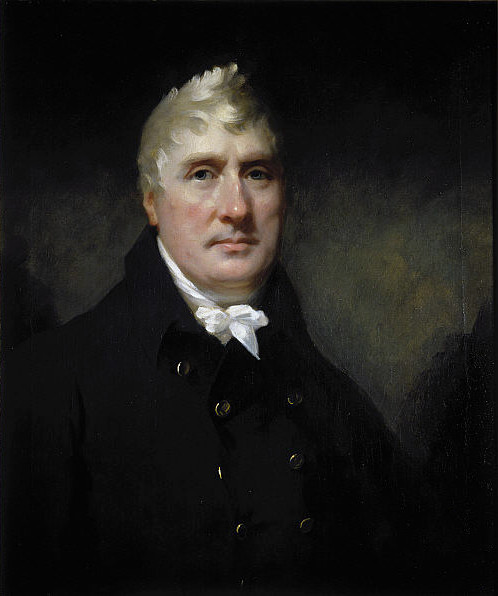
John Rennie the Elder

- June 7 – John Rennie the Elder, Scottish-born civil engineer (d. 1821)
- August 17 – Levi Hutchins, American clockmaker, nventor of the alarm clock (d. 1855)
- October 21 – Louis Albert Guislain Bacler d'Albe, French painter and cartographer (d. 1824)
- October 27 – Matthew Baillie, Scottish physician and pathologist (d. 1823)
- November 4 – Bertrand Andrieu, French engraver of medals (d. 1822)
- November 13 – John Moore, British general (d. 1809)
- November 20 – Pope Pius VIII (d. 1830)
- December 1 – Marie Tussaud, French wax modeller (d. 1850)
- December 24 – Jean-Louis Pons, French astronomer (d. 1831)

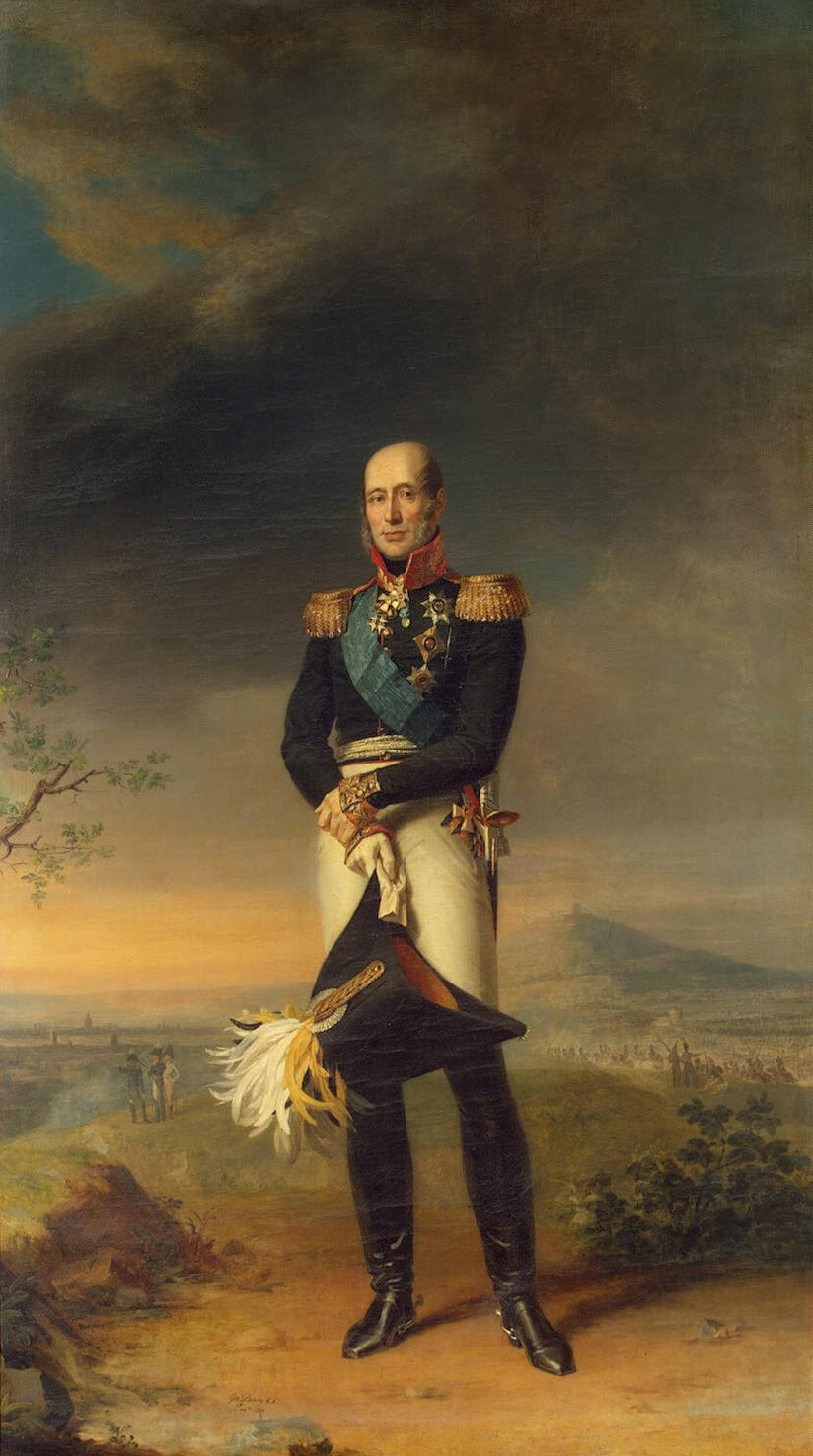
Michael Andreas Barclay de Tolly

- December 27 – Michael Andreas Barclay de Tolly, Russian military commander (d. 1818)
- Date unknown – Dido Elizabeth Belle, British slave heiress (d. 1804)

1762

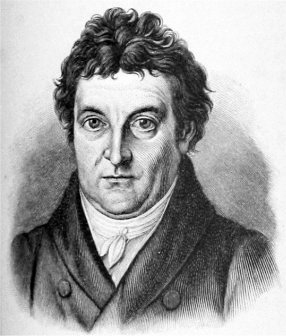
Johann Gottlieb Fichte

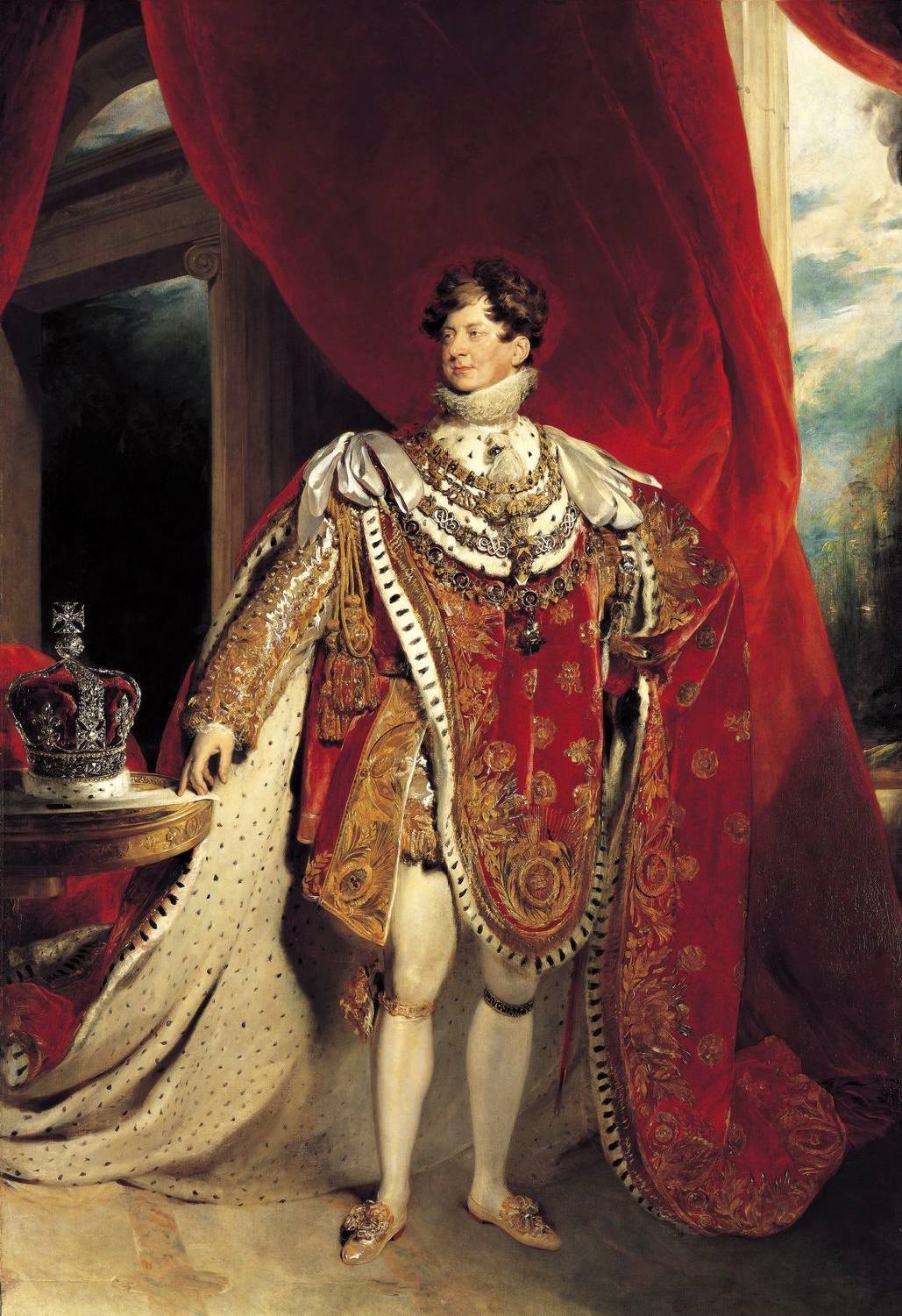
George IV

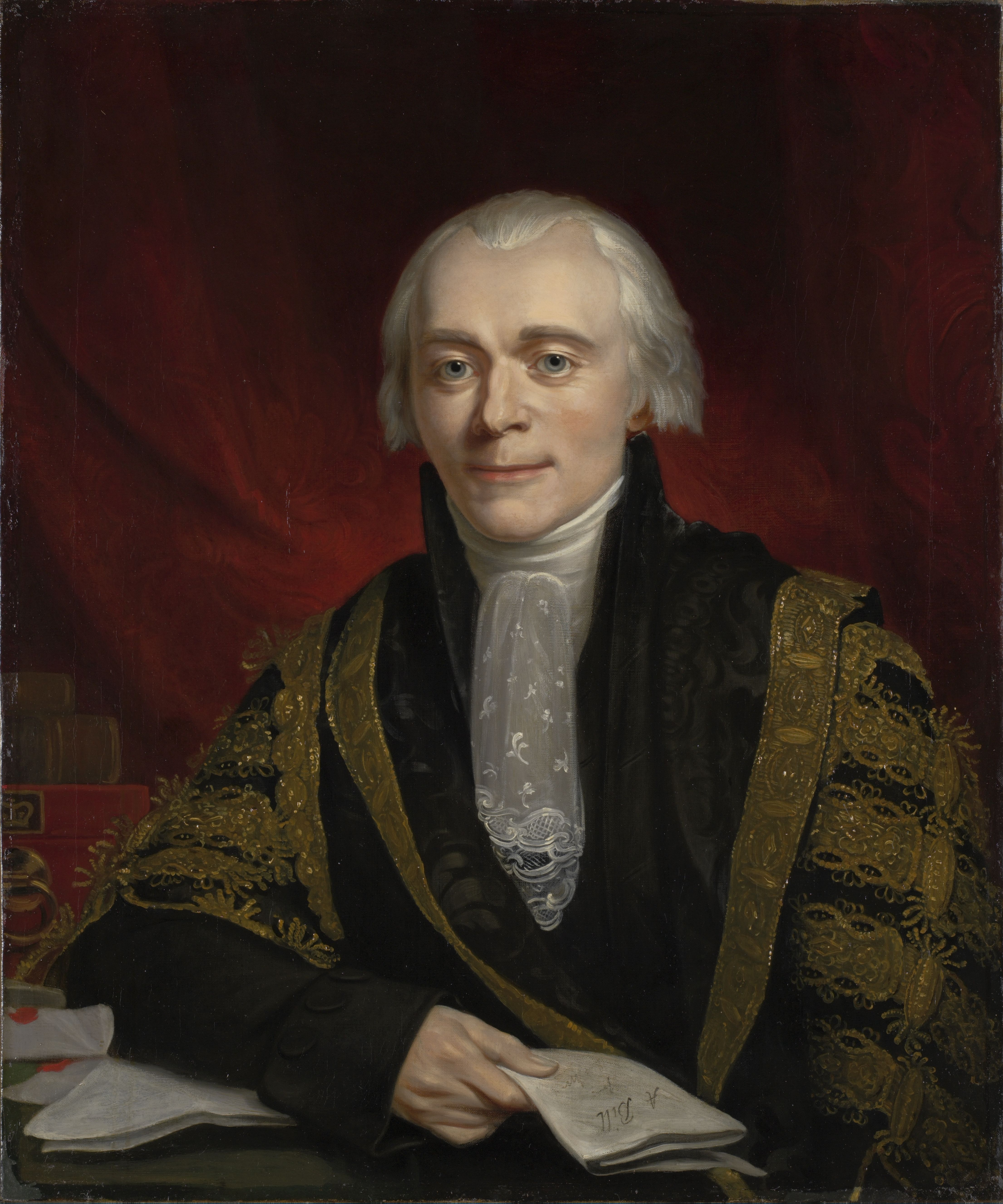
Spencer Perceval, British Prime Minister assassinated in 1812.

- January 31 – Molly Morgan, British convict and settler in Australia (d. 1835)
- February 4 – Johan Herman Schützercrantz, Swedish admiral
- February 17 – John Cooke, English captain (d. 1805)
- March 11 – Robert Gray, British bishop (d. 1834)
- March 22 – William Robert Broughton, British explorer (d. 1821)
- April 29 – Jean-Baptiste Jourdan, French marshal (d. 1833)
- May 6 – William Hargood, British admiral (d. 1839)
- May 19 – Johann Gottlieb Fichte, German philosopher (d. 1814)
- May 20 – Eyre Coote, Irish soldier and politician (d. 1823)
- May 22 – Henry Bathurst, 3rd Earl Bathurst, British politician (d. 1834)
- June 5 – Bushrod Washington, American politician and Associate Justice of the Supreme Court of the United States (d. 1829)
- July 17 – Alexander Macdonell, Scottish bishop in Canada (d. 1840)
- August 12
  - King George IV of the United Kingdom (d. 1830)
  - Christoph Wilhelm Hufeland, German physician (d. 1836)
- August 13 – Théroigne de Méricourt, French revolutionary (d. 1817)
- September 11 – Joanna Baillie, Scottish writer (d. 1851)
- October 1 – Anton Bernolák, Slovak linguist (d. 1813)
- October 9 – Charles de Suremain, French military and diplomat (d. 1835)
- October 12 – Jan Willem Janssens, Governor-General of the Dutch East Indies (d. 1838)
- October 16 – Paul Hamilton, American politician (d. 1816)
- October 21
  - George Colman the Younger, British playwright (d. 1836)
  - Herman Willem Daendels, governor-general of the Dutch East Indies (d. 1818)
- October 23 – Samuel Morey, American inventor (d. 1843)
- October 30 – André Chénier, French writer (d. 1794)
- November 1 – Spencer Perceval, Prime Minister of the United Kingdom (d. 1812)
- November 27 – Sir Samuel Hood, 1st Baronet, British admiral (d. 1814)
- November – Manuel Torres, first Colombian ambassador to the United States (d. 1822)
- December 22 – Dudley Ryder, 1st Earl of Harrowby, British politician (d. 1847)
- December 25 – Michael Kelly, Irish composer and singer (d. 1826)

=== Date unknown ===
- Andrew Hay, British general (d. 1814)
- Birgithe Kühle, Norwegian journalist (d. 1832)
- Natalia Shelikhova, Russian business person (d. 1810)

1763

- January 8
  - Edmond-Charles Genêt, French ambassador to the United States during the French Revolution (d. 1834)
  - Jean-Baptiste Drouet, French revolutionary politician (d. 1824)
- January 24 – Louis Alexandre Andrault de Langeron, Russian general (d. 1831)

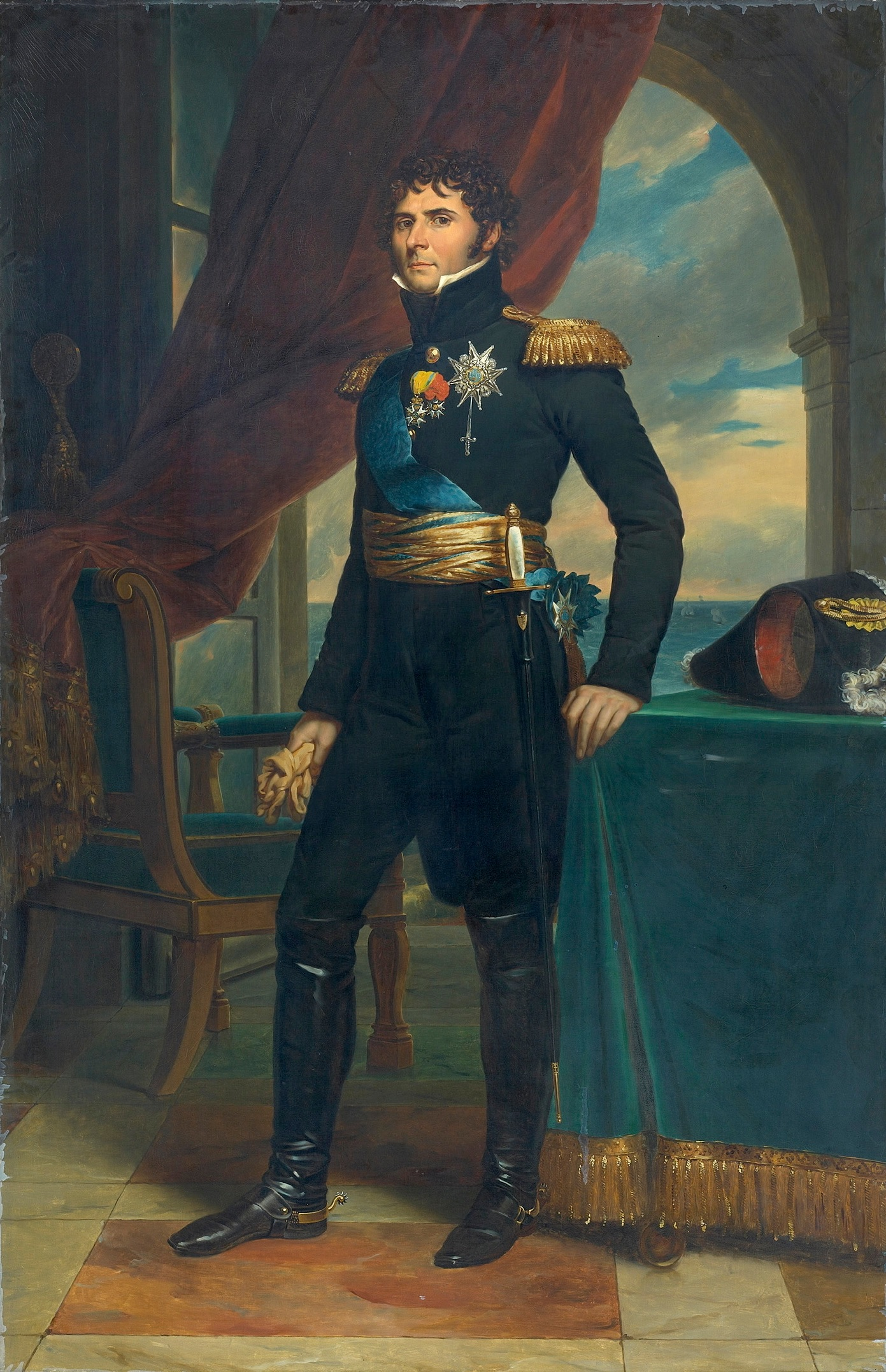
Jean-Baptiste Bernadotte

- January 26 – Jean-Baptiste Bernadotte, Marshal of France, King Charles XIV John of Sweden and Charles III John of Norway (d. 1844)
- February 14 – Jean Victor Marie Moreau, French general (d. of wounds 1813)
- February 20 – Adalbert Gyrowetz, Bohemian composer (d. 1850)
- March 9 – William Cobbett, English journalist, author (d. 1835)
- March 13 – Guillaume-Marie-Anne Brune, Marshal of France (k. 1815)
- March 20 – Charles Sturt, English politician (d. 1812)
- March 21 – Jean Paul, German writer (d. 1825)
- May 7 – Józef Antoni Poniatowski, Polish prince, Marshal of France (d. 1813)
- June 20 – Theobald Wolfe Tone, Irish patriot (executed 1798)

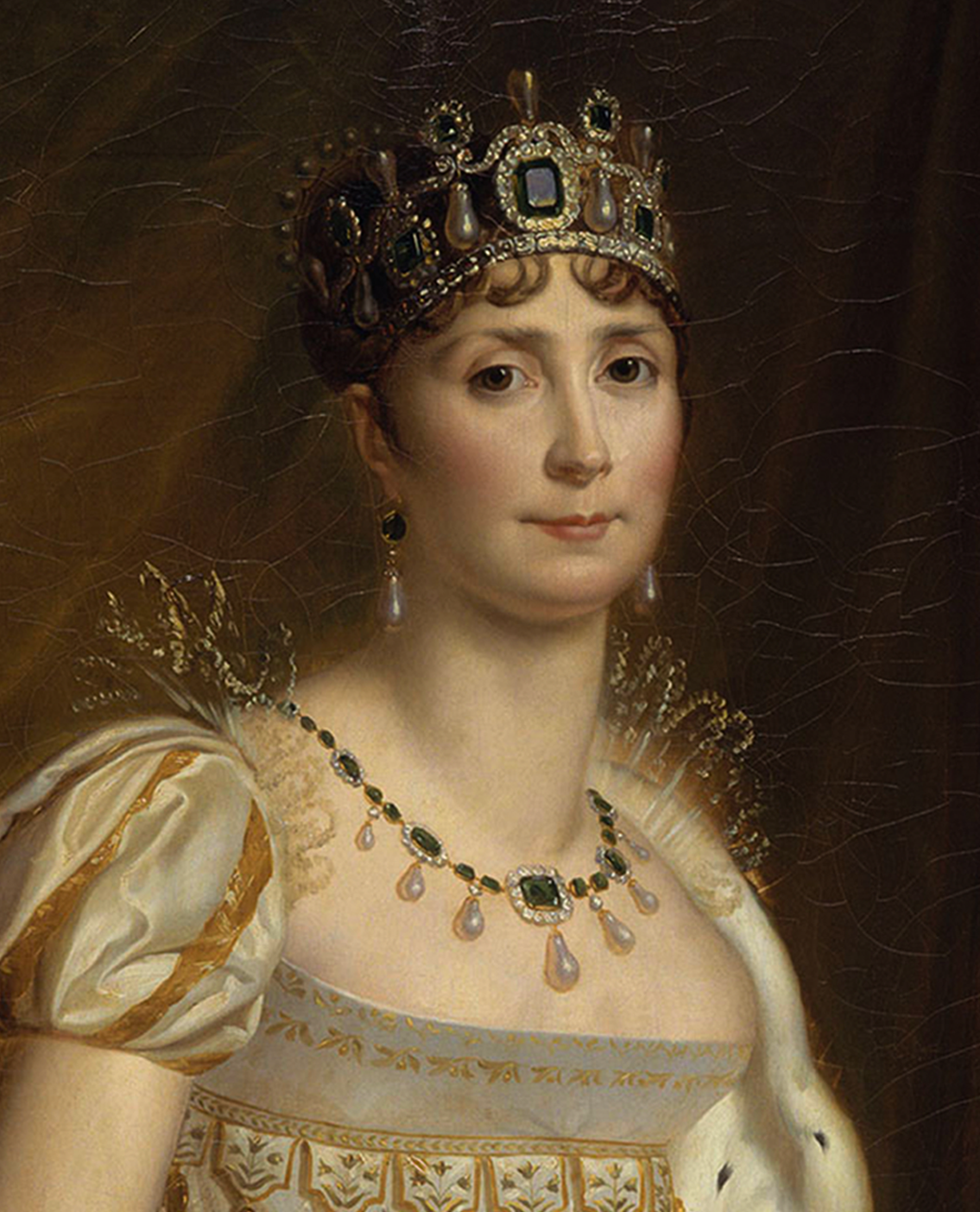
Joséphine de Beauharnais

- June 23 – Joséphine de Beauharnais, born Marie Josèphe Rose Tascher de La Pagerie, Martinique-born French empress consort (d. 1814)
- July 17 – John Jacob Astor, German-born American entrepreneur (d. 1848)
- August 5 – Bill Richmond, American-born British boxer (d. 1829)
- August 13 – Christoph Johann von Medem, German courtier (d. 1838)
- August 16 – Prince Frederick, Duke of York and Albany, second son of George III of Great Britain (d. 1827)
- August 17 – Dmitry Senyavin, Russian admiral (d. 1831)
- September 2 – Caroline Schelling, German scholar, intellectual (d. 1809)
- December 25 – Claude Chappe, French telecommunication pioneer (d. 1805)
- December 28 – John Molson, Canadian entrepreneur (d. 1836)
- December 31 – Pierre-Charles Villeneuve, French admiral (suicide 1806)
- Date unknown – Huang Pilie, Chinese bibliophile (d. 1825)

1764

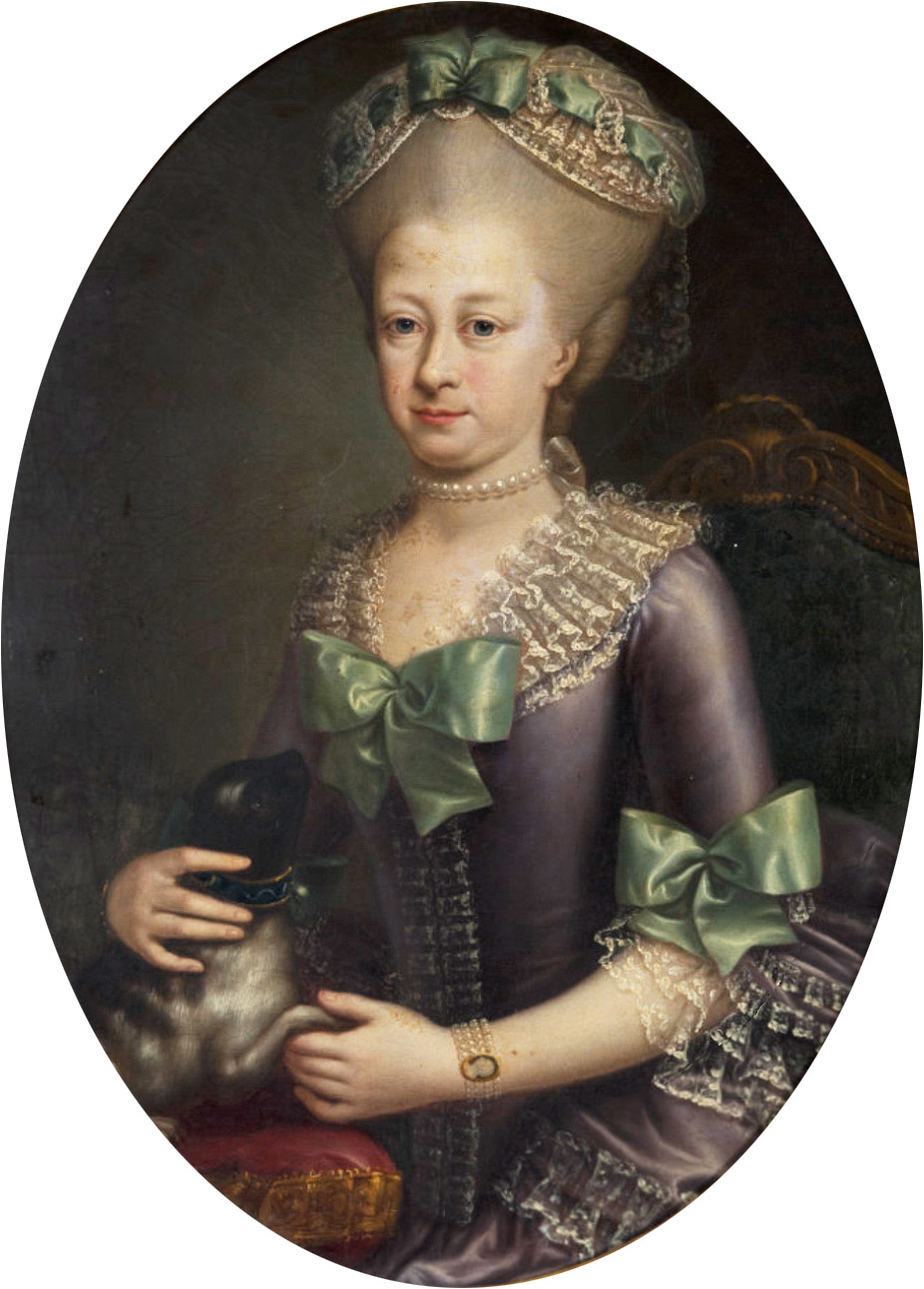
Princess Maria Carolina of Savoy

- January 6 – John Gray, last verified American Revolutionary War veteran (d. 1868)
- January 17 – Princess Maria Carolina of Savoy, crown princess of Saxony, died of smallpox (d. 1782)
- February 11 – Joseph Chénier, French poet (d. 1811)
- March 13 – Charles Grey, 2nd Earl Grey, 26th Prime Minister of the United Kingdom (d. 1845)
- April 3 – John Abernethy, English surgeon (d. 1831)
- April 13 – Laurent de Gouvion Saint-Cyr, French marshal (d. 1830)
- April 20 – Rudolph Ackermann, German-born English entrepreneur (d. 1834)

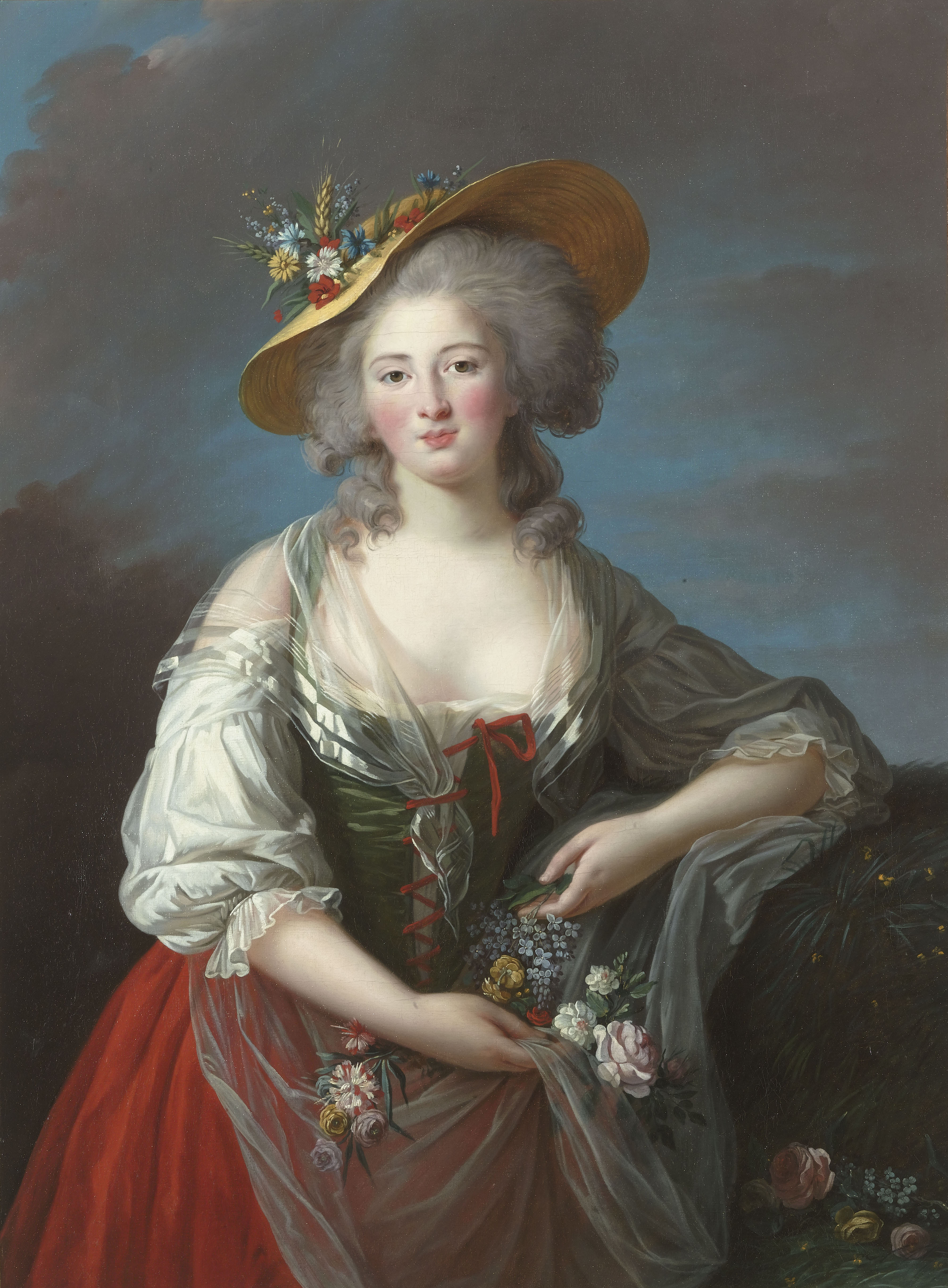
Princess Élisabeth of France

- May 3 – Princess Élisabeth of France, sister of Louis XVI (executed 1794)
- May 5 – Robert Craufurd, Scottish general (k. 1812)
- May 7 – Therese Huber, German writer and scholar (d. 1829)
- May 26 – Edward Livingston, American jurist, statesman (d. 1836)
- June 5 – James Smithson, British mineralogist, chemist and posthumous founder of the Smithsonian Institution (d. 1829)
- June 19 – José Gervasio Artigas, Uruguayan hero of independence (d. 1850)
- June 21 – Sidney Smith, British admiral (d. 1840)
- July 9 – Ann Radcliffe, English Gothic novelist (d. 1823)
- August 13 – Louis Baraguey d'Hilliers, French general (d. 1813)
- August 18 – Judah Leib Ben-Ze'ev, Galician Jewish modern Hebrew philologist, lexicographer, Biblical scholar and poet (d. 1811)
- September 5 – Henriette Herz, German salonnière (d. 1847)
- September 7 – Pierre Lorillard II, American businessman, real estate tycoon (d. 1843)
- September 17 – John Goodricke, English astronomer (d. 1786)
- September 25 – Fletcher Christian, English sailor and mutineer (d. 1793)
- November 1 – Frederick Reynolds, English playwright (born (d. 1841)
- December 7
  - Pierre Prévost, French panorama painter (d. 1823)
  - Claude-Victor Perrin, Duc de Belluno, Marshal of France (d. 1841)
- Date unknown – Maria Medina Coeli, Italian physician (d. 1846)
- Approximate date – Alexander Mackenzie (explorer), Scottish explorer of northern Canada (d. 1820)
- Circa 1764- Bennelong, Aboriginal Australian leader and translator, (d. 1819)

1765

- January 11 – Antoine Alexandre Barbier, French librarian (d. 1825)
- January 23 – Thomas Todd, Associate Justice of the Supreme Court of the United States (d. 1826)
- February 1 – Charles Hatchett, English chemist (d. 1847)
- February 8 – Joseph Leopold Eybler, Austrian composer (d. 1846)
- February 22 – Meta Forkel-Liebeskind, German writer, scholar (d. 1853)

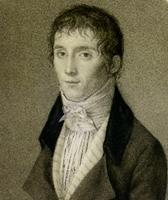
Nicéphore Niépce

- March 7 – Nicéphore Niépce, French inventor (d. 1833)
- March 27 – Franz Xaver von Baader, German philosopher, theologian (d. 1841)
- April 1 – Luigi Schiavonetti, Italian engraver (d. 1810)
- April 6 – Duke Charles Felix of Savoy (d. 1831)
- April 11 – Gertrudis Bocanegra, Mexican national heroine (d. 1817)
- April 26 – Emma, Lady Hamilton, English mistress of Horatio Nelson (d. 1815)
- June 15 – Henry Thomas Colebrooke, English orientalist (d. 1831)
- July 14 – Abigail Adams Smith, firstborn daughter of Abigail Adams and John Adams (d. 1813)
- July 26 – Jean-Baptiste Drouet, Comte d'Erlon, French marshal (d. 1844)
- August 4 – Claire Lacombe, French actress, political activist
- August 6 – Petrobey Mavromichalis, Prime Minister of Greece (d. 1848)

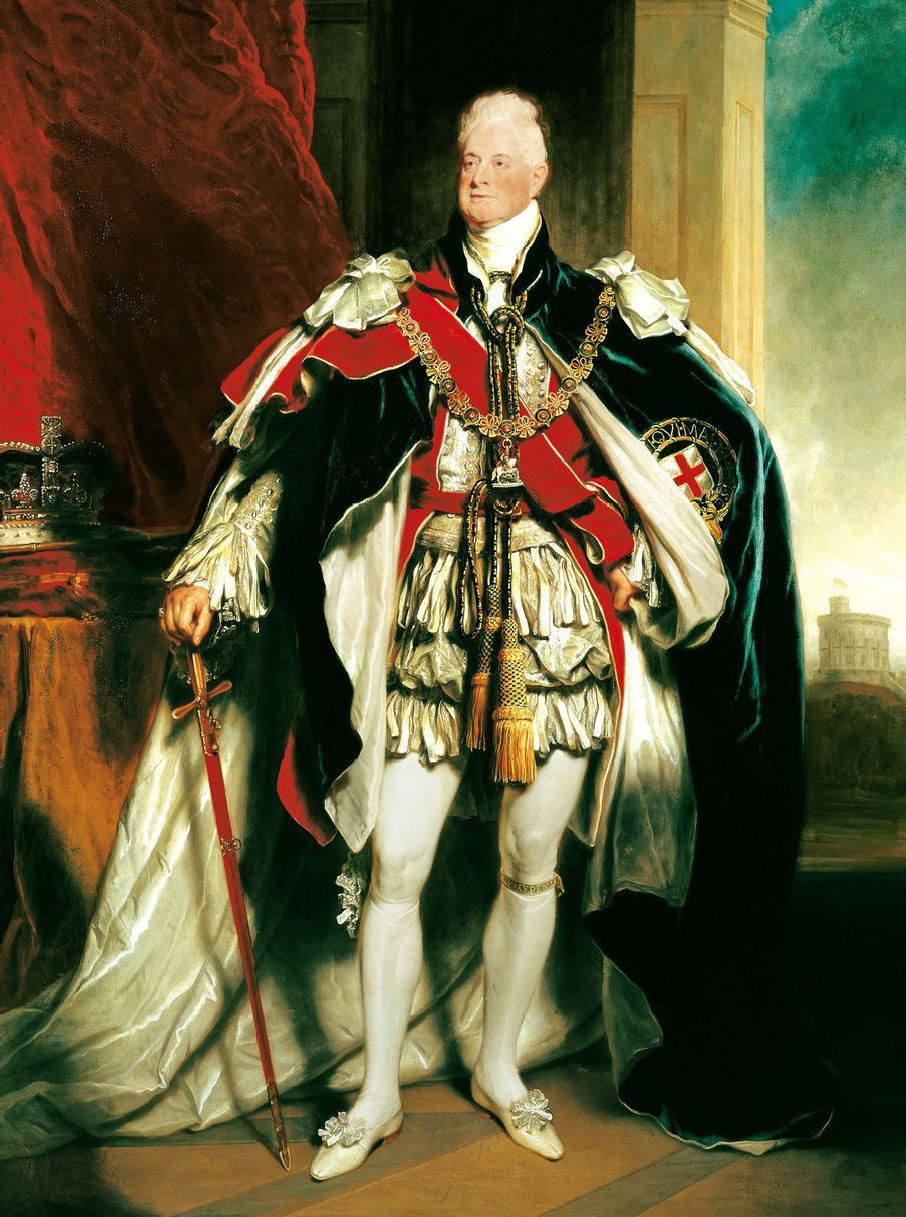
William IV

- August 21 – King William IV of the United Kingdom (d. 1837)
- August 24 – Thomas Muir, Scottish advocate, revolutionary (d. 1799)
- September 16 – Harry Burrard-Neale, British Royal Navy officer and politician (d. 1840)
- September 18 – Pope Gregory XVI (d. 1846)
- September 25 – Michał Kleofas Ogiński, Polish-Lithuanian, and later Russian imperial statesman and composer
- September 29 – Karl Ludwig Harding, German astronomer (d. 1834)
- September 30 – José María Morelos, leader of Mexican War of Independence (d. 1815)
- October 8 – Harman Blennerhassett, Irish-American lawyer (d. 1831)
- October 15 – Sir George Pocock, 1st Baronet, English politician and peer (died 1840)
- October 17 – Henri Jacques Guillaume Clarke, duc de Feltre, French marshal and politician (d. 1818)
- October 18 – Josefa Joaquina Sánchez, Venezuelan embroiderer and independence heroine (d. 1813)
- October 24 – James Mackintosh, Scottish publicist (d. 1832)

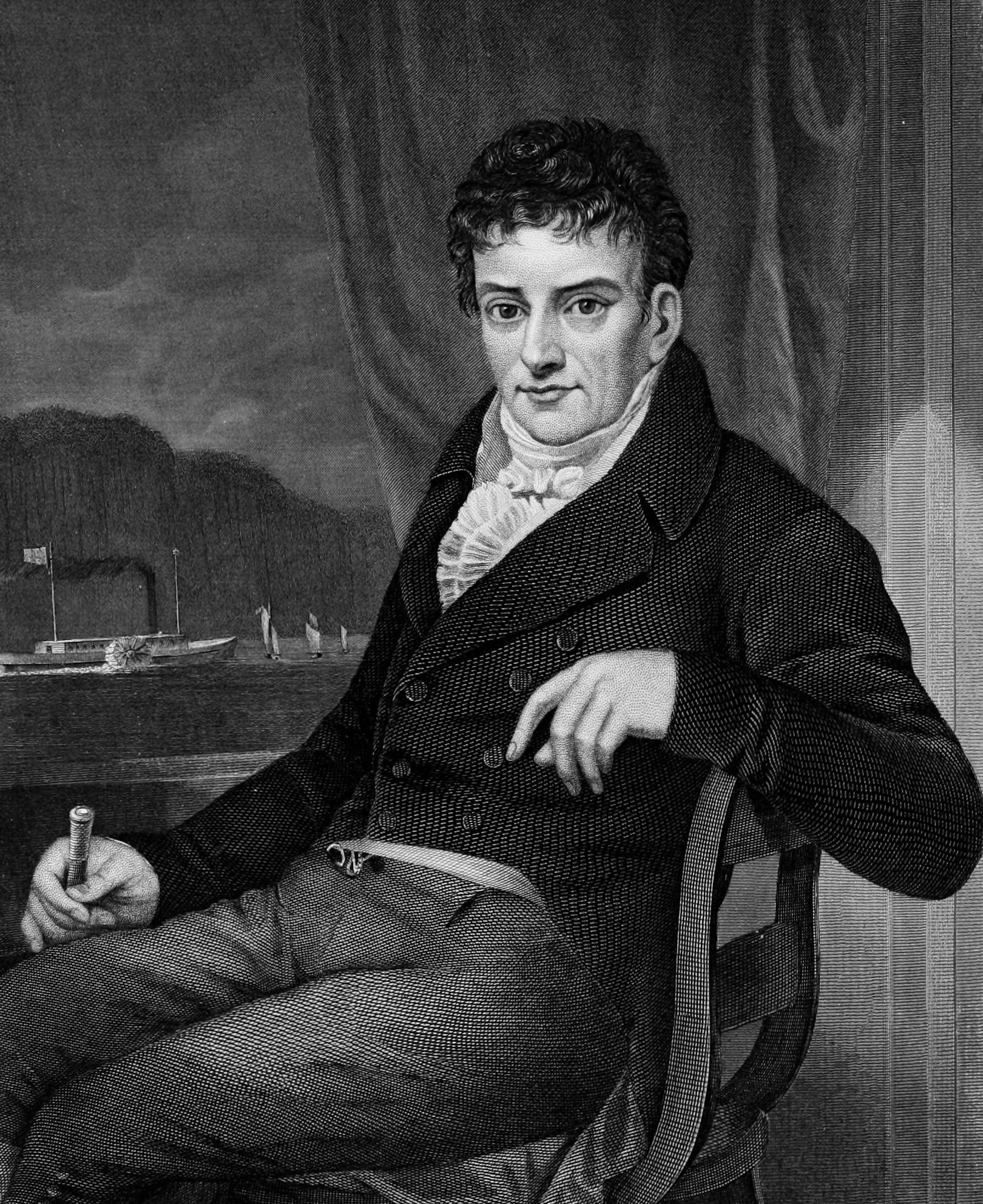
Robert Fulton

- November 14 – Robert Fulton, American inventor (d. 1815)
- November 17 – Étienne Macdonald, French marshal (d. 1840)
- November 19 – Filippo Castagna, Maltese politician (d. 1830)
- November 20 – Sir Thomas Fremantle, British captain and politician (d. 1819)
- November 28 – George William Manby, English author and inventor (d. 1854)
- December 8 – Eli Whitney, American inventor (d. 1825)
- December 22 – Johann Friedrich Pfaff, German mathematician (d. 1825)
- date unknown
  - Mary Bryant, one of the first successful escapees from the fledgling Australian penal colony
  - James Smithson, British mineralogist, chemist and posthumous founder of the Smithsonian Institution (d. 1829)

1766

- January 1 – Magdalena Rudenschöld, Swedish conspirator (d. 1823)
- January 3 – Nguyễn Du, Vietnamese poet (d. 1820)
- January 6 – José Gaspar Rodríguez de Francia, Supreme Leader of Paraguay (d. 1840)
- January 17 – Joseph Kinghorn, Particular Baptist Minister (d. 1832)
- February 11 – Henry Fourdrinier, British engineer, inventor (d. 1854)
- February 14 – Thomas Malthus, English demographer, economist (d. 1834)
- February 24 – Samuel Wesley, English organist and composer (died 1837)
- April 1 – François-Xavier Fabre, French painter of historical subjects (d. 1837)
- April 6 – Charles-Louis de Fourcroy, French Consul at A Coruña, Chevalier de la Légion d'honneur (d. 1824)
- April 22 – Germaine de Staël, French author (d. 1817)
- May 11 – Isaac D'Israeli, English literary scholar (died 1848)
- May 30 – Robert Darwin, medical doctor and father of Charles Darwin (d. 1848)
- June 13 – Jean-Frédéric Waldeck, French cartographer (d. 1875)
- July 8 – Dominique Jean Larrey, French surgeon, innovator in battlefield medicine (d. 1842)
- July 9 – Jacob Perkins, American physicist, inventor and engineer (d. 1849)
- July 21 – Thomas Charles Hope, Scottish chemist, discoverer of strontium (d. 1844)

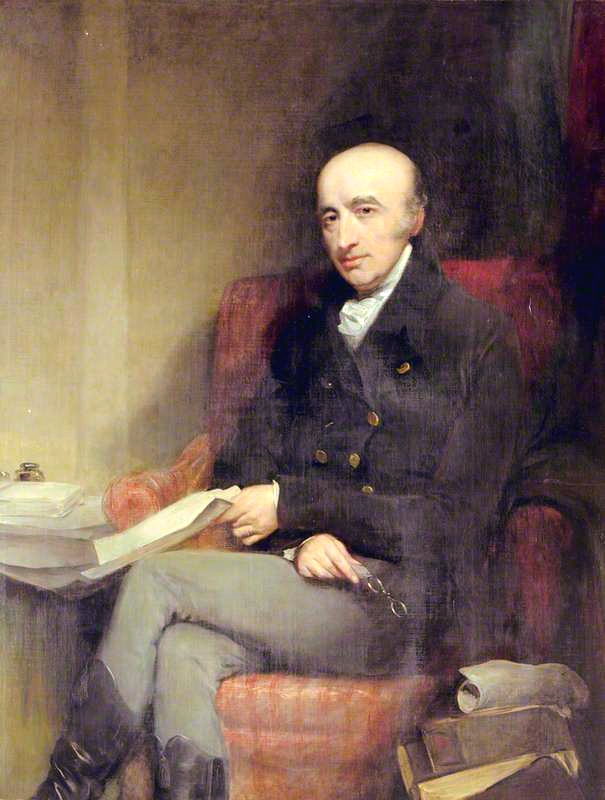
William Hyde Wollaston

- August 6 – William Hyde Wollaston, English chemist (d. 1828)

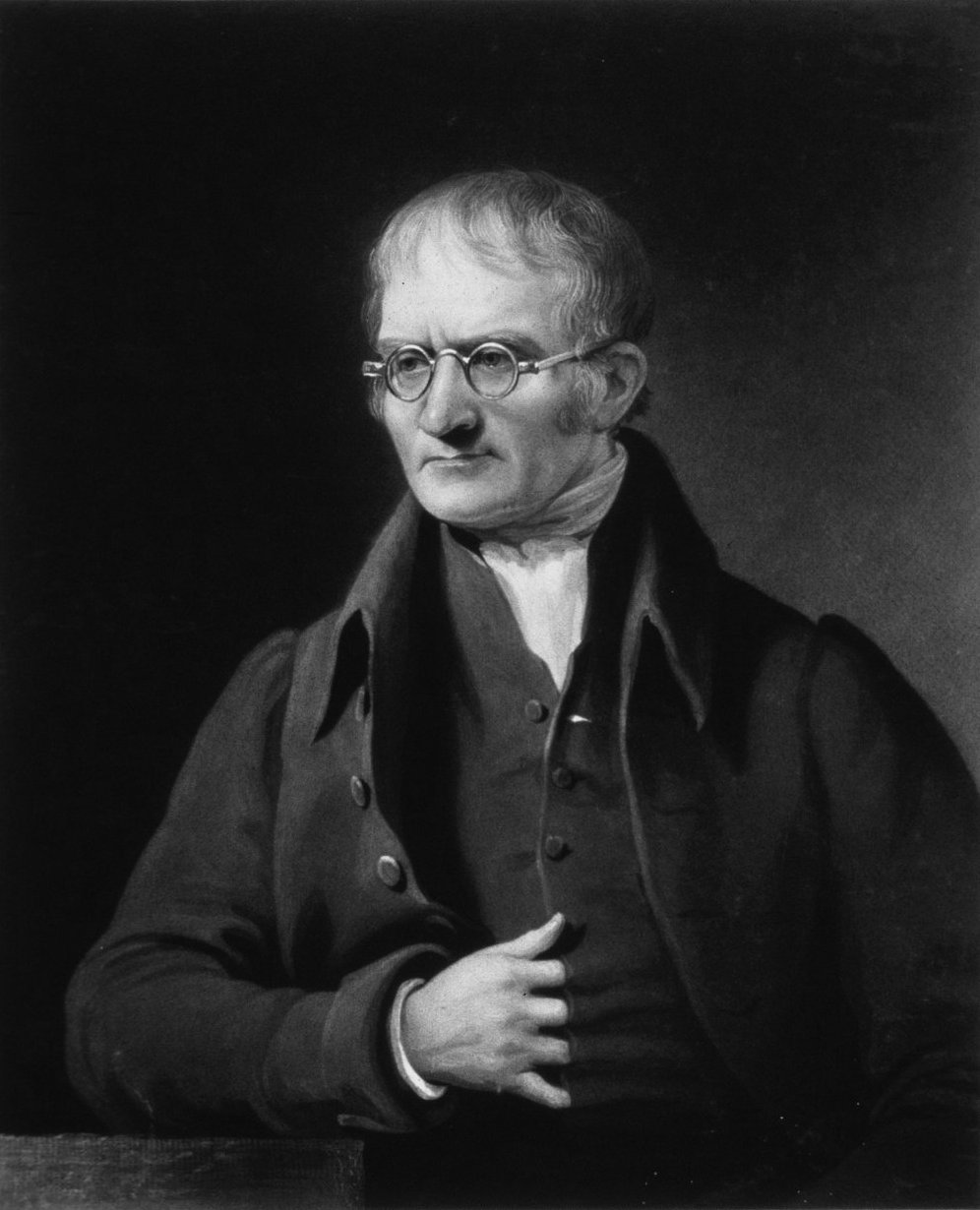
John Dalton

- September 6 – John Dalton, English chemist and physicist (d. 1844)
- September 25 – Armand-Emmanuel de Vignerot du Plessis, Duc de Richelieu, Prime Minister of France (d. 1822)
- October 3 – John Walbach, French baron and officer in the United States Army, with a military career spanning over 57 years (d. 1857)
- October 23 – Emmanuel de Grouchy, Marquis de Grouchy, French marshal (d. 1847)
- November 2 – Joseph Radetzky von Radetz, Austrian field marshal (d. 1858)
- November 9 – Edward Abbott, Australian soldier, politician and judge (d. 1832)
- November 12 – Daniel Sykes, English politician (d. 1832)
- November 16 – Rodolphe Kreutzer, violinist and composer (d. 1831)
- December 3 – Barbara Fritchie, U.S. patriot in the Civil War (d. 1862)
- December 23 – Wilhelm Hisinger, Swedish physicist and chemist (d. 1852)
- December 29 – Charles Macintosh, Scottish inventor of a waterproof fabric (died 1843)
- date unknown – Lolotte Forssberg, Swedish courtier (d. 1840)

1767

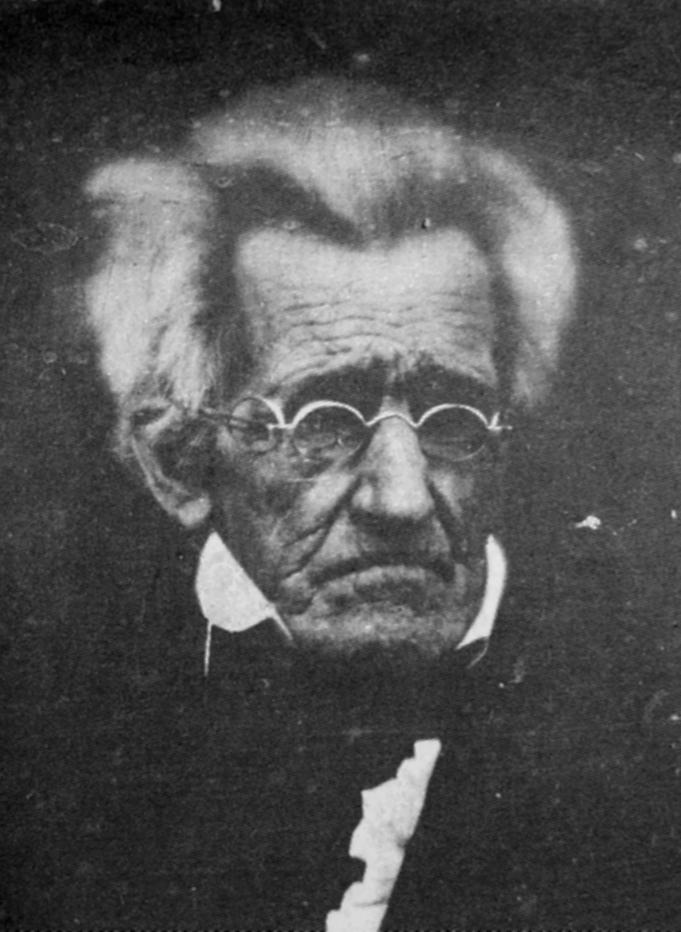
Andrew Jackson

- January 8 – Jean-Baptiste Say, French economist, originator of Say's law (d. 1832)
- January 16 – Cornélie Lebon (née de Brambilla), Belgian born French engineer (d. 1812)
- February 2 – Johann Heinrich Friedrich Link, German naturalist, botanist (d. 1851)

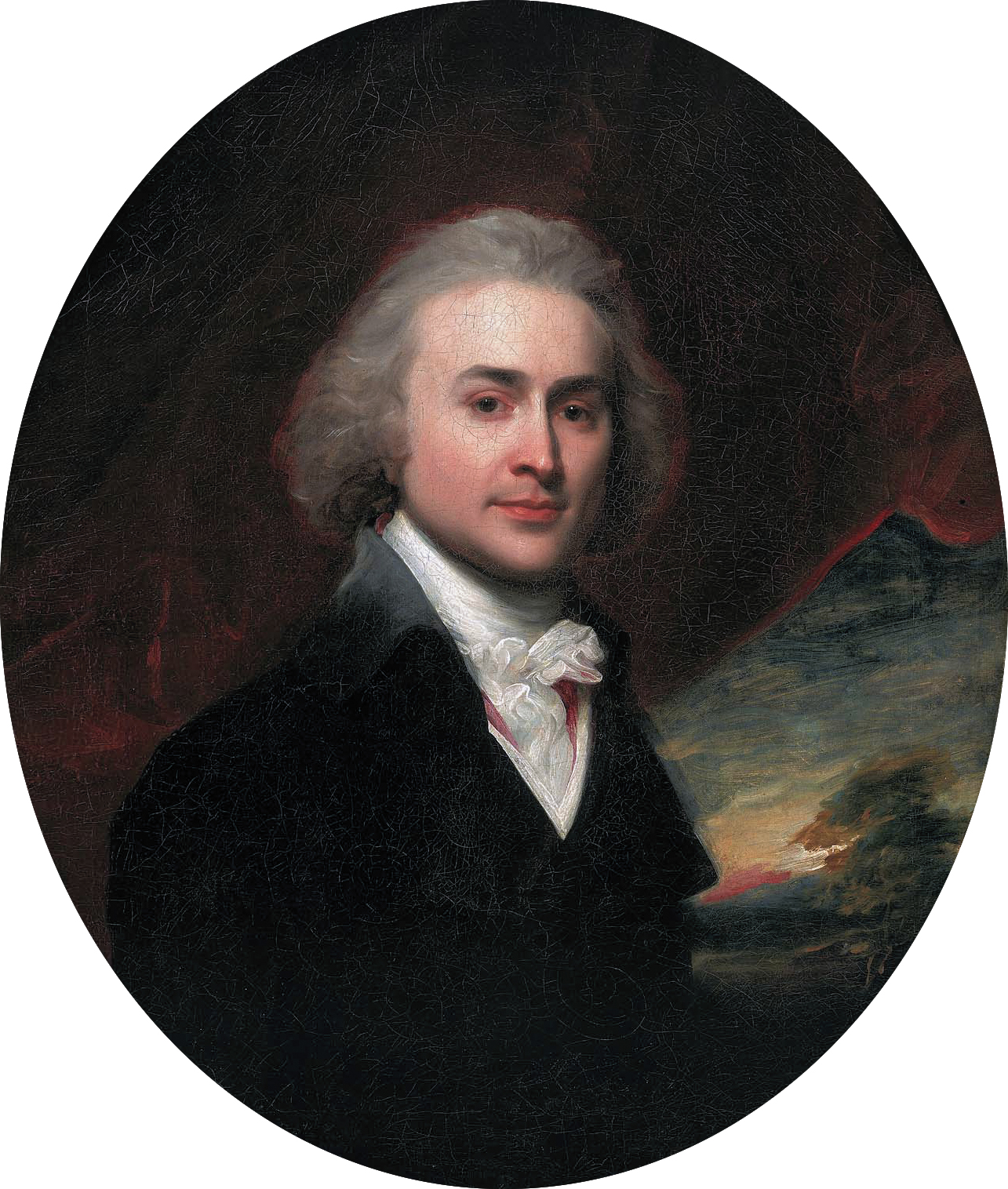
John Quincy Adams

- March 15 – Andrew Jackson, seventh President of the United States (d. 1845)
- March 25 – Joachim Murat, French marshal, King of Naples (d. 1815)
- April 21 – Elisabeth of Württemberg, Archduchess of Austria (d. 1790)
- April 25 – Nicolas Oudinot, French marshal (d. 1847)
- May 4 – Tyagaraja, Indian Carnatic music composer (d. 1847)
- May 12 – Manuel Godoy, Spanish statesman (d. 1851)
- May 13 – John VI of Portugal, King of Portugal (d. 1826)
- June 24 – Jean-Baptiste Benoît Eyriès, French geographer, author and translator (d. 1846)
- July 4 – Kyokutei Bakin, Japanese author (d. 1848)
- July 11 – John Quincy Adams, sixth President of the United States, son of John Adams and Abigail Adams (d. 1848)
- July 28 – James Asheton Bayard Sr., U.S. Senator from Delaware (d. 1815)
- August 24 – Bernhard Meyer, German physician, ornithologist (d. 1836)
- August 25 – Louis Antoine de Saint-Just, French revolutionary (d.1794)
- September 20 – José Maurício Nunes Garcia, Brazilian composer (d. 1830)
- October 25 – Benjamin Constant, Swiss writer (d. 1830)
- November 2 – Prince Edward, Duke of Kent and Strathearn, member of the British Royal Family (d. 1820)
- November 20 – Andreas Hofer, Austrian national hero (d. 1810)
- December 3 – Antoine Fabre d'Olivet, French writer (d. 1825)
- date unknown
  - Black Hawk, Sauk Indian Chief, autobiographer (b. Saukenuk village, now Rock Island, Illinois) (d. 1838)
  - Marianna Malińska, Polish ballerina (d. 1797)

1768

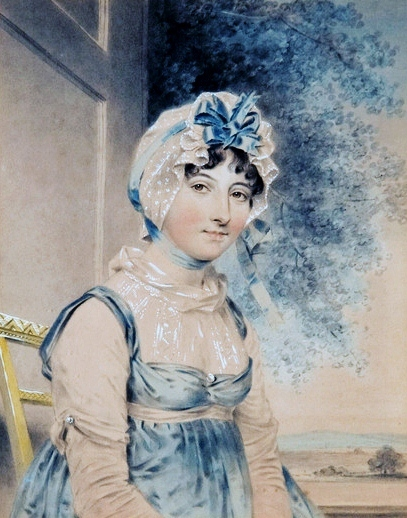
Maria Edgeworth

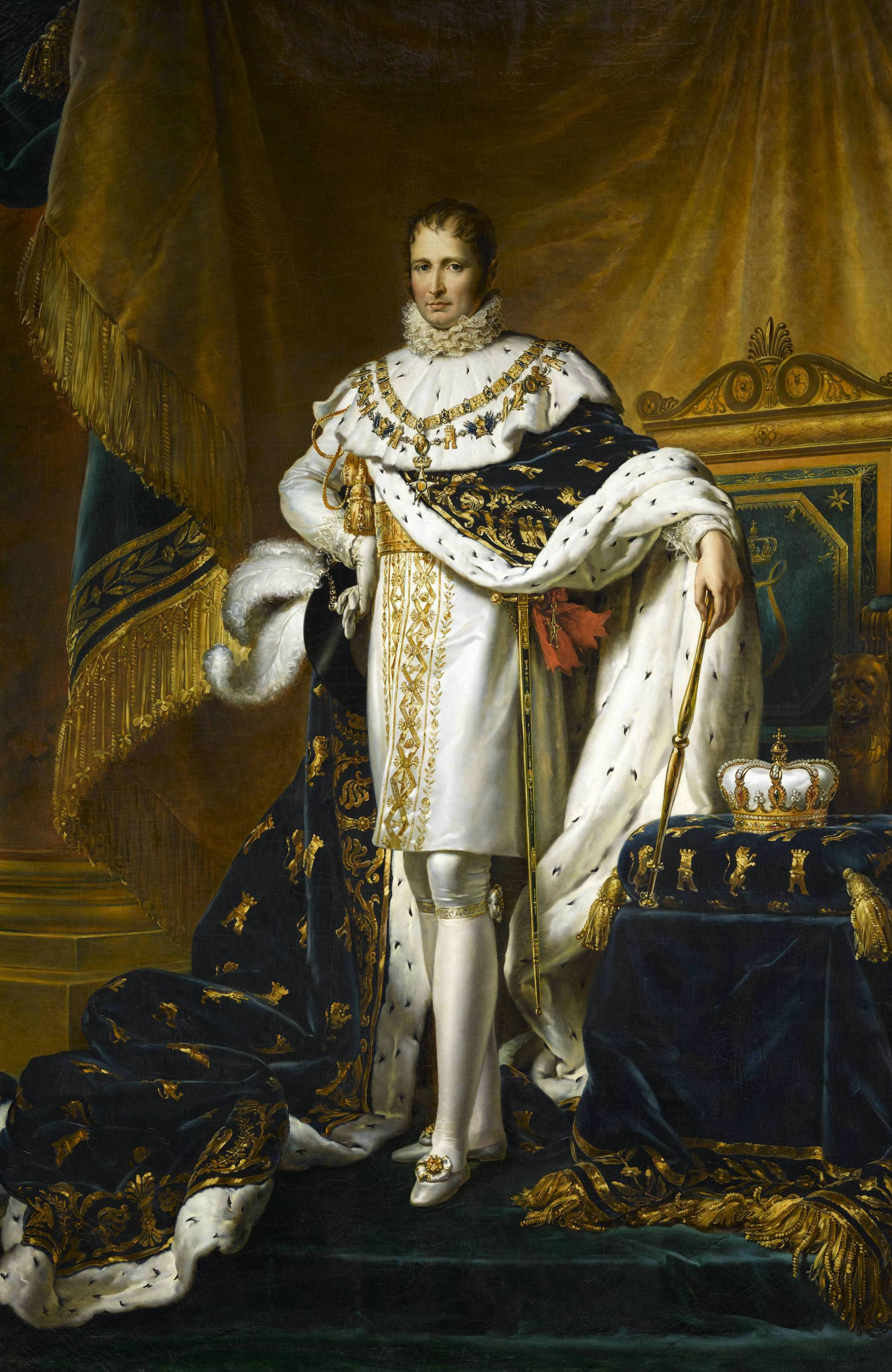
Joseph Bonaparte

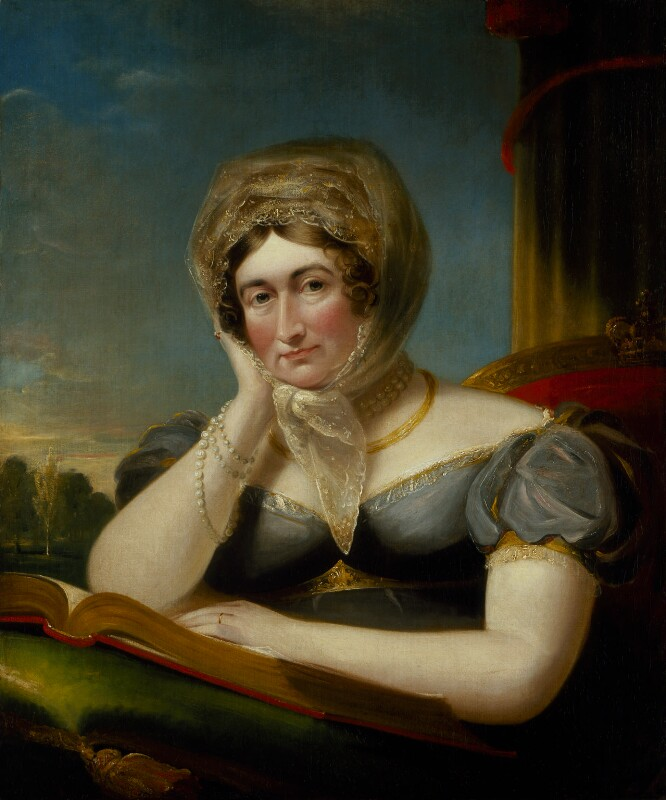
Caroline of Brunswick

- January 1 – Maria Edgeworth, Irish novelist (d. 1849)
- January 7 – Joseph Bonaparte, King of Naples and Spain (d. 1844)
- January 17 – Smith Thompson, American politician, Associate Justice of the Supreme Court of the United States (d. 1843)
- January 28 – King Frederick VI of Denmark (d. 1839)
- February 12 – Francis II, Holy Roman Emperor (d. 1835)
- February 13 – Édouard Mortier, Duke of Trévise, French marshal (d. 1835)
- March – Tecumseh, Native American (Shawnee) chief (d. 1813)
- March 21 – Joseph Fourier, French mathematician, physicist (d. 1830)
- March 22 – Melesina Trench, Irish born writer and socialite (d. 1827)
- May 3 – Charles Tennant, Scottish chemist, industrialist (d. 1838)
- May 17
  - Caroline of Brunswick, queen of George IV of the United Kingdom (d. 1821)
  - Henry Paget, 1st Marquess of Anglesey, English general (d. 1854)
- June 9 – Samuel Slater, American industrialist (d. 1835)
- June 20 – William Findlay, American politician (d. 1846)
- June 24 – Lazare Hoche, French general (d. 1797)
- June 29 – Vincenzo Dimech, Maltese sculptor (d. 1831)
- July 4 – Adolph Carl August von Eschenmayer, German philosopher (d. 1852)
- July 20 – Praskovia Kovalyova-Zhemchugova, Russian serf, actress and opera soprano (d. 1803)
- July 27 – Charlotte Corday, French murderer of Jean-Paul Marat (d. 1793)
- August 6 – Jean-Baptiste Bessières, French marshal (d. 1813)
- August 29 – – John Fawcett, British actor (d. 1837)
- September 4 – François-René de Chateaubriand, French writer, diplomat (d. 1848)
- September 23 – William Wallace, Scottish Mathematician (d. 1843)
- September 28 – Pauline Léon, French feminist, radical (d. 1838)
- October 2 – William Beresford, 1st Viscount Beresford, British general and politician (d. 1854)
- October 6 – Josef Madersperger, Austrian tailor, inventor and sewing machine pioneer (d. 1850)
- October 31 – María Isidra de Guzmán y de la Cerda, Spanish scholar (b. 1803)
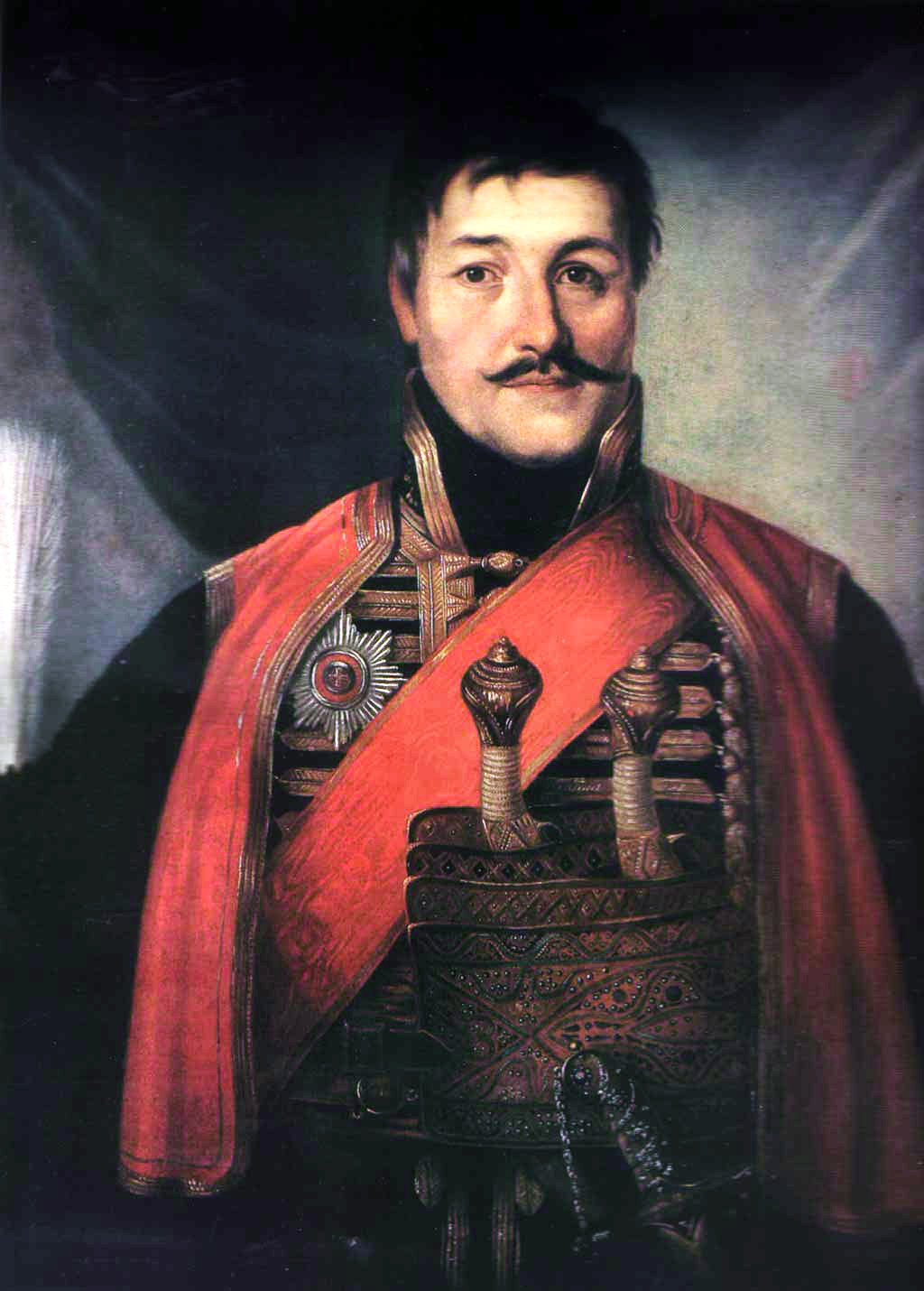
- Karađorđe
  November 3 – Karađorđe Petrović, leader of the First Serbian Uprising against the Ottoman Empire, founder of the Serbian Karađorđević dynasty (d. 1817)
- November 18
  - Zacharias Werner, German religious poet (d. 1823)
  - José Marchena Ruiz de Cueto, Spanish writer (d. 1821)
- November 21 – Friedrich Schleiermacher, German theologian (d. 1834)
- date unknown
  - Marie-Jeanne de Lalande, French astronomer, mathematician (d. 1832)
  - Wang Zhenyi, Chinese astronomer
  - María Remedios del Valle, Argentine soldier and patriot (d. 1847)
  - Amelia Griffiths, British phycologist (d. 1858)
  - William Thornhill, British Army officer (d. 1851)

1769

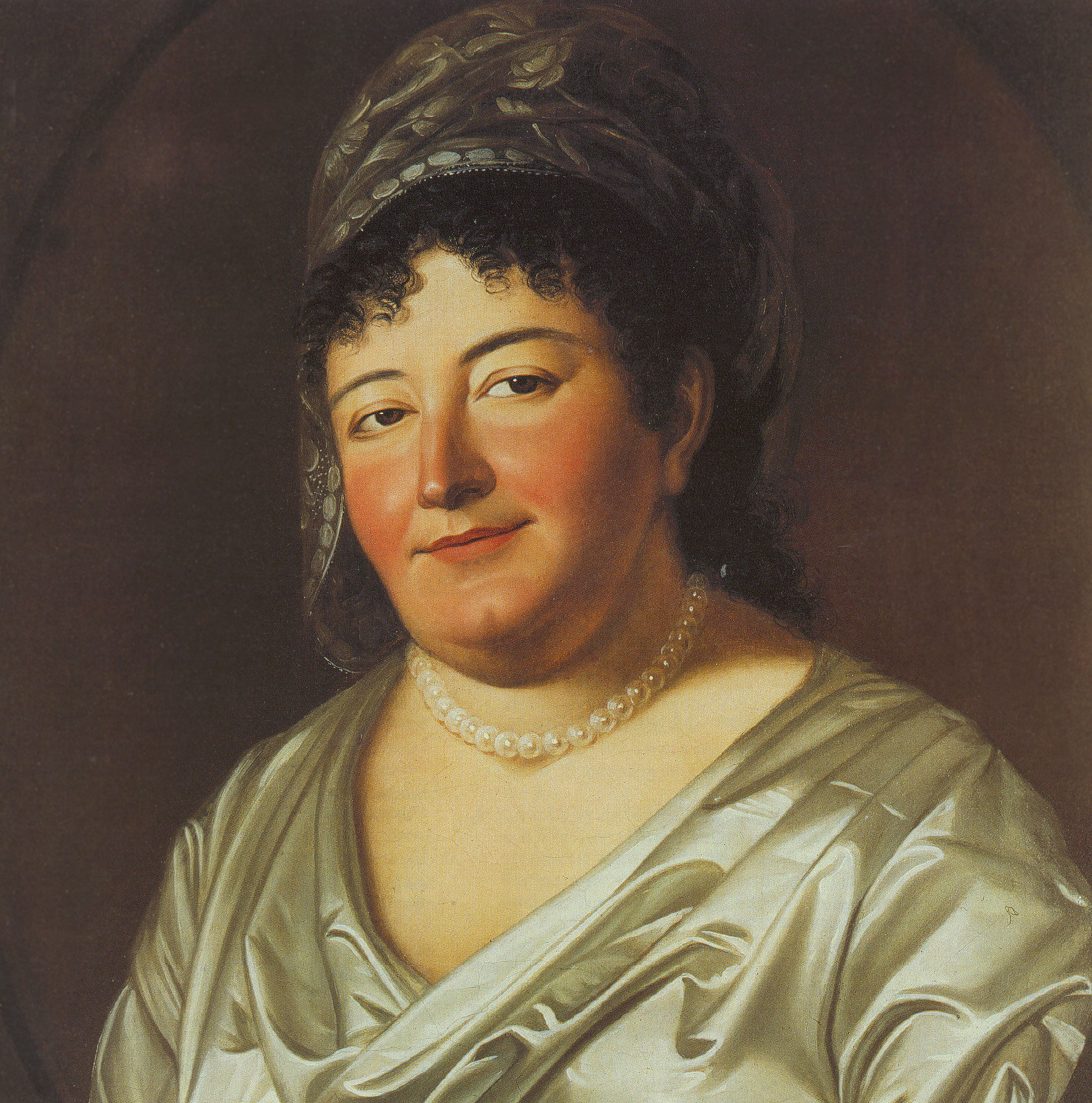
Princess Pauline of Anhalt-Bernburg

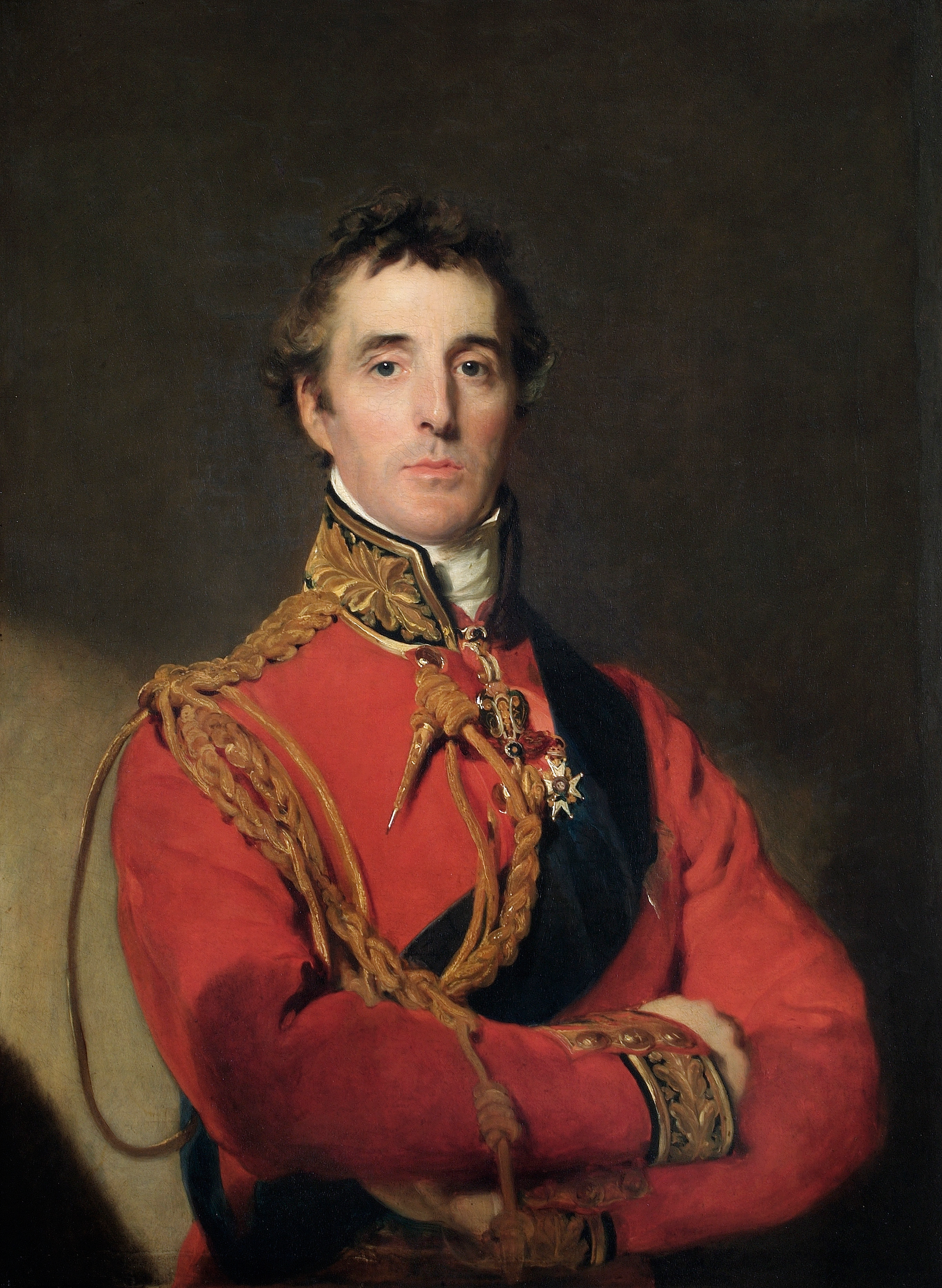
Arthur Wellesley, 1st Duke of Wellington

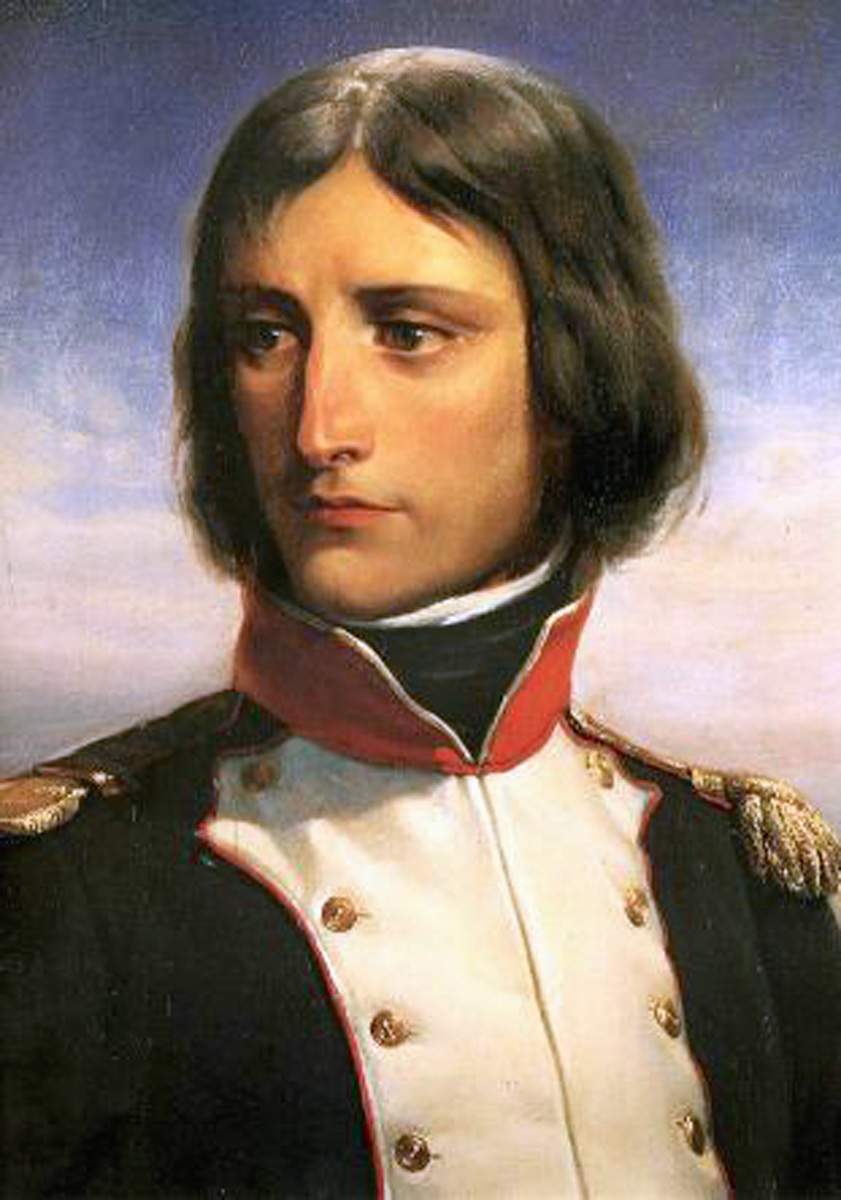
Napoleon

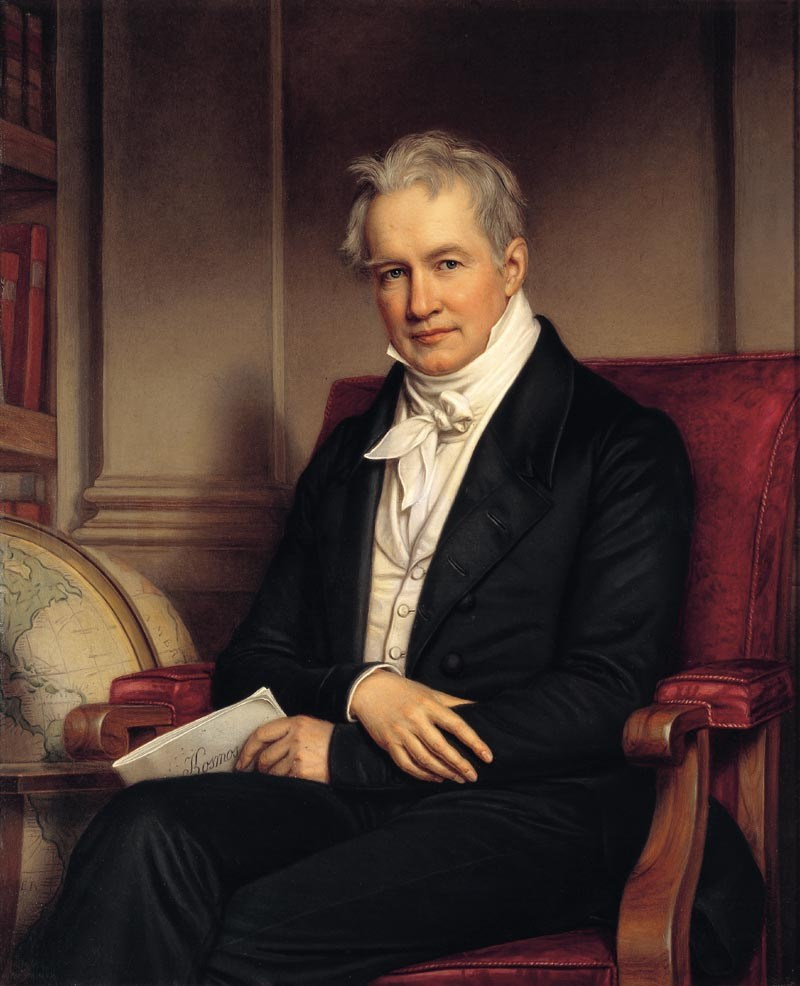
Alexander von Humboldt

- January 1
  - Marie Lachapelle, French obstetrician (d. 1821)
  - Jane Marcet, British science writer (d. 1858)
- January 2 – Nannette Streicher, German piano maker, composer, music educator and writer (d. 1833)
- January 10 – Michel Ney, French marshal (d. 1815)
- February 23 – Princess Pauline of Anhalt-Bernburg; German regent and social reformer (d. 1820)
- March 1 – François Séverin Marceau-Desgraviers, French general (d. 1796)
- March 2 – DeWitt Clinton, American politician and naturalist, 6th Governor of New York (d. 1828)
- March 4 – Muhammad Ali of Egypt, Egyptian ruler (d. 1849)
- March 8 – Samuel Richards, American ironmaster (d. 1842)
- March 10 – Joseph Williamson, English philanthropist, builder of the Williamson Tunnels (d. 1840)
- March 23 – William Smith, English geologist, cartographer (d. 1839)
- March 29 – Jean-de-Dieu Soult, French marshal (d. 1851)
- April 3 – Christian Günther von Bernstorff, Danish and Prussian statesman and diplomat (d. 1835)
- April 9 – Jakob Heinrich Laspeyres, German lepidopterist (d. 1809)
- April 10 – Jean Lannes, French marshal (d. 1809)
- April 13 – Thomas Lawrence, English painter (d. 1830)
- April 14 – Barthélemy Catherine Joubert, French general (d. 1799)
- April 25 – Marc Isambard Brunel, French-British engineer (d. 1849)
- May 1 – Arthur Wellesley, 1st Duke of Wellington, British general, Prime Minister of the United Kingdom (d. 1852)
- May 6 – Ferdinand III, Grand Duke of Tuscany (d. 1824)
- June 5 – Marianne Kirchgessner, German musician (d. 1808)
- June 18 – Robert Stewart, Viscount Castlereagh, British statesman, diplomat, and soldier (suicide 1822)
- July 28 – Hudson Lowe, Irish-born soldier and future jailer of Napoleon on Saint Helena (d. 1831)
- August 15 – Napoleon Bonaparte, French Emperor (d. 1821)
- August 23 – Georges Cuvier, French naturalist and zoologist; known as the Father of Paleontology (d. 1832)
- August 31 – David Hosack American physician and botanist, a Hamilton family doctor (d. 1835)
- September 14
  - Alexander von Humboldt, German explorer, scientist (d. 1859)
  - Karl Salomo Zachariae von Lingenthal, German jurist (d. 1843)
- October 6 – Isaac Brock, British general, administrator (d. 1812)
- December 13 – James Scarlett Abinger, English judge (d. 1844)
- December 23 – Martin Archer Shee, Irish painter (d. 1850)
- December 26 – Ernst Moritz Arndt, German writer, poet (d. 1860)
- date unknown
  - James Dadford, English canal engineer
  - John Bellingham, assassin of British Prime Minister Spencer Perceval (d. 1812)
  - Howqua, Chinese merchant (d. 1843)
- probable
  - John Henry Colclough, Irish revolutionary (d. 1798)

== Deaths ==
1760

- February 22 – Anna Magdalena Bach, accomplished German singer, second wife of Johann Sebastian Bach (b. 1701)
- April 3 – John Rous, Royal Navy officer during King George's War and the Seven Years' War (b. 1702)
- April 6 – Charlotte Charke, British actor and writer (b. 1713)
- April 10 – Jean Lebeuf, French historian (b. 1687)
- April 11 – Prince Moritz of Anhalt-Dessau, German general (b. 1712)
- April 18 – Mary Alexander, influential colonial-era merchant in New York City (b. 1693)
- May 5 – Laurence Shirley, 4th Earl Ferrers, English murderer (hanged) (b. 1720)
- May 9 – Nicolaus Ludwig Zinzendorf, German religious and social reformer (b. 1700)
- May 10 – Christoph Graupner, German composer (b. 1683)
- May 15 – King Alaungpaya of Burma (b. 1711)
- May 22 – Israel ben Eliezer aka Baal Shem Tov, Polish-born mystical rabbi, founder of Hasidic Judaism (b. 1698)
- May 30 – Joanna Elisabeth of Holstein-Gottorp, German duchess (b. 1712)
- June 13 – Antoine Court, French Huguenot minister (b. 1696)
- July 13 – Conrad Weiser, Pennsylvania's ambassador to the Iroquois Confederacy (b. 1696)
- August 27 – Smart Lethieullier, English antiquary (b. 1701)
- September 11 – Louis Godin, French astronomer (b. 1704)
- September 17 – George Bowes, English coal proprietor, Member of Parliament (b. 1701)
- October 15 – Nicolas d'Assas, captain of the French regiment of Auvergne (b. 1733)

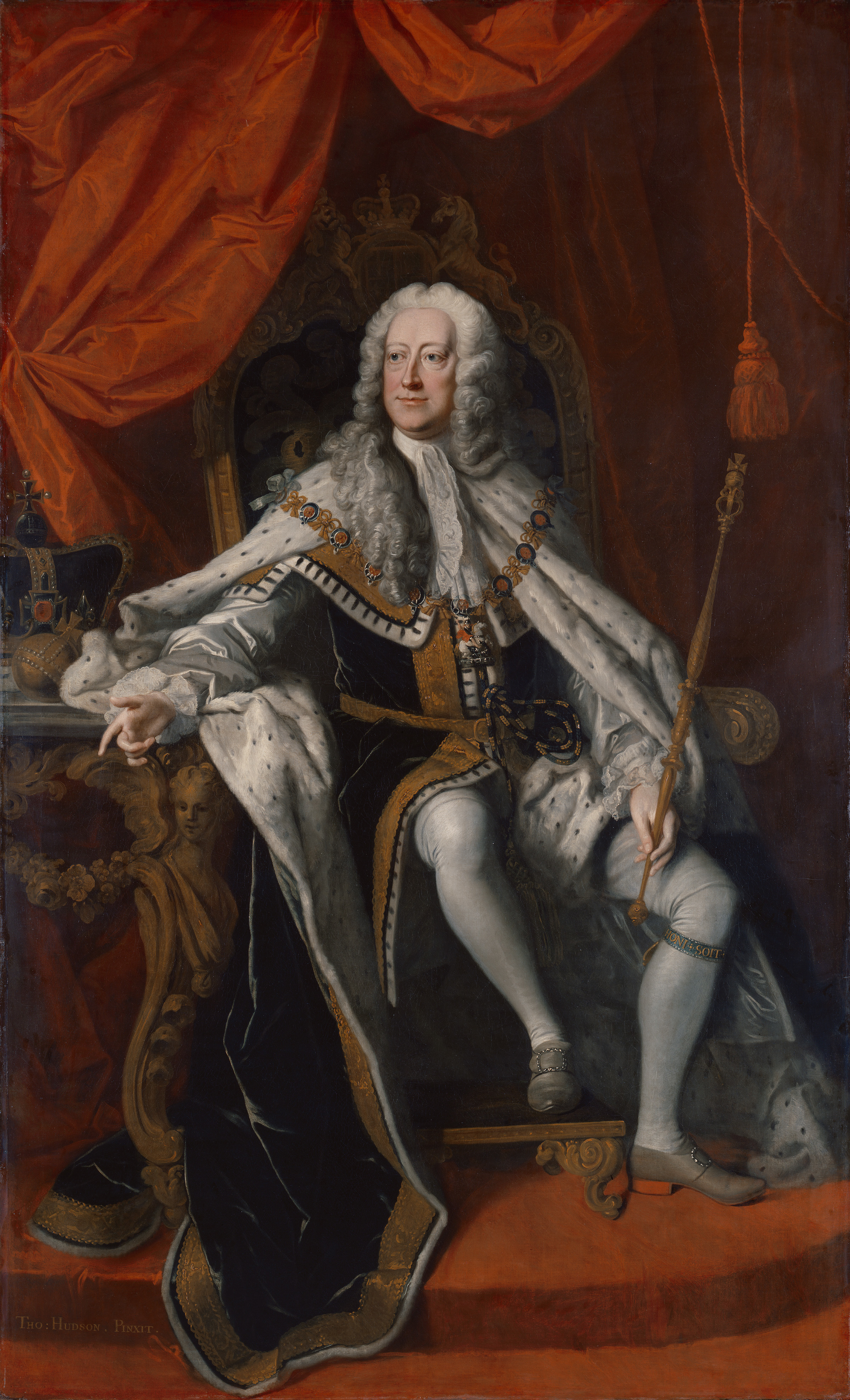
George II of Great Britain

- October 25 – King George II of Great Britain (b. 1683)
- November 30 – Friederike Caroline Neuber, German actress (b. 1697)

1761

- January 4 – Stephen Hales, English physiologist, chemist, and inventor (b. 1677)
- January 7 – Darkey Kelly, Irish madam and serial murderer, executed by burning

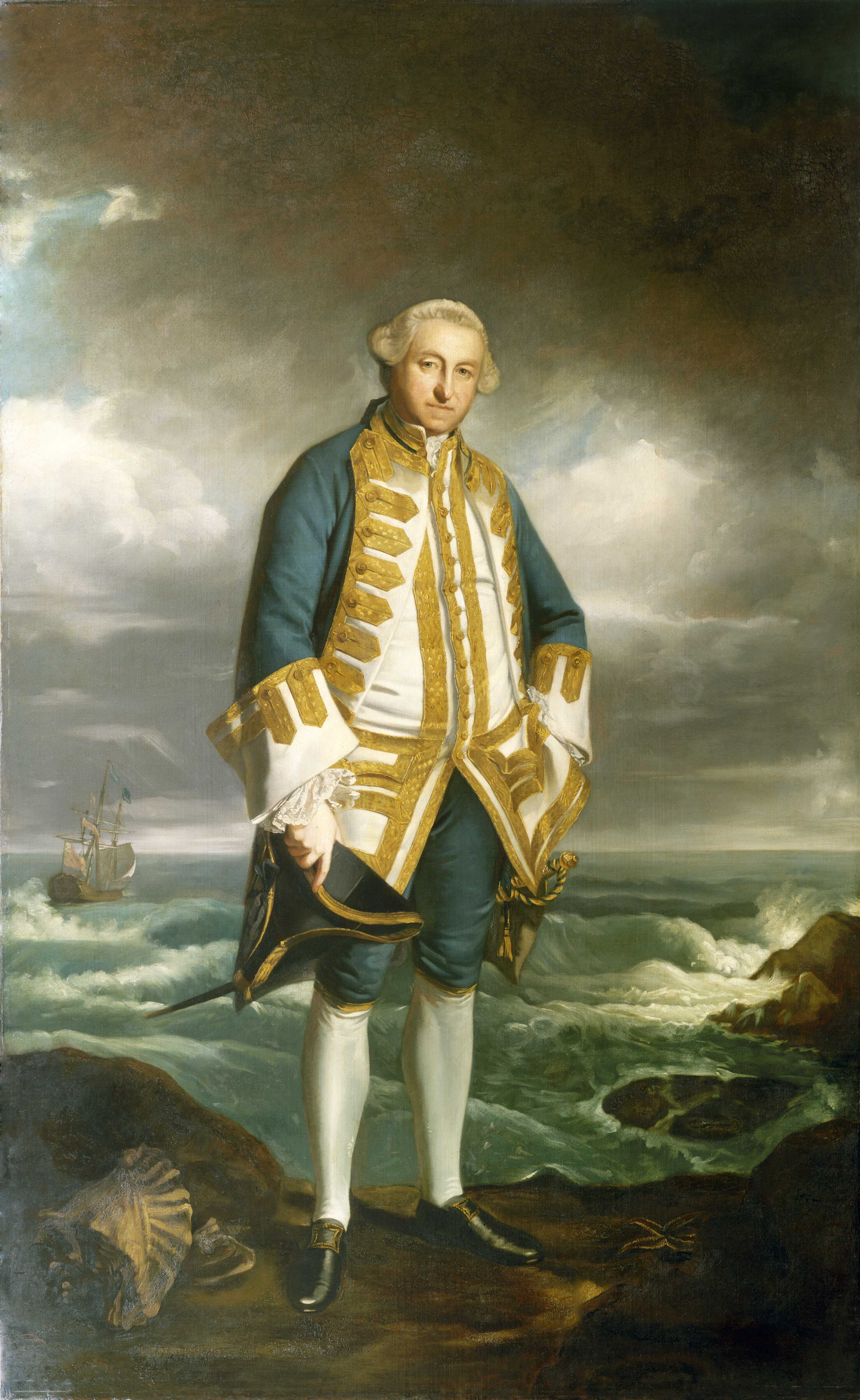
Edward Boscawen

- January 10 – Edward Boscawen, British admiral (b. 1711)
- January 26 – Charles Louis Auguste Fouquet, duc de Belle-Isle, French general and statesman (b. 1684)
- February 1 – Pierre François Xavier de Charlevoix, French historian (b. 1682)
- February 6 – Clemens August of Bavaria, Archbishop-Elector of Cologne (b. 1700)
- April 2 – William Sawyer, English cricketer (b. 1712)
- April 4 – Theodore Gardelle, Swiss painter, enameler (b. 1722)
- April 9 – William Law, English minister (b. 1686)
- April 15
  - Archibald Campbell, 3rd Duke of Argyll, Scottish politician (b. 1682)
  - William Oldys, English antiquarian and bibliographer (b. 1696)
- April 17 – Thomas Bayes, English mathematician (b. c. 1702)
- May 1 – August Friedrich Müller, German legal scholar, logician (b. 1684)
- May 10
  - James Colebrooke, British baronet (b. 1722)
  - Richard Edgcumbe, 2nd Baron Edgcumbe, British baron, politician (b. 1716)
- May 14 – Thomas Simpson, English mathematician (b. 1710)
- June 2 – Jonas Alströmer, Swedish industrialist (b. 1685)
- June 29 – Princess Elisabeth Albertine of Saxe-Hildburghausen, Duchess consort of Mecklenburg-Strelitz (b. 1713)
- July 4 – Samuel Richardson, English writer (b. 1689)
- July 9 – Carl Gotthelf Gerlach, German organist (b. 1704)
- July 13 – Tokugawa Ieshige, Japanese shōgun (b. 1712)
- July 16 – Jacob Fortling, Danish sculptor (b. 1711)
- August 3 – Johann Matthias Gesner, German classical scholar (b. 1691)
- September 8 – Bernard Forest de Bélidor, French engineer (b. 1698)
- October 22 – Louis George, Margrave of Baden-Baden (b. 1702)
- October 25 – Gioacchino Conti, Italian opera singer (b. 1714)
- November 21 – Charles Holmes, British Royal Navy admiral (b. 1711)
- November 30 – John Dollond, English optician (b. 1706)
- December 9 – Tarabai, Indian queen regent of the Maratha Empire (b. 1675)
- December 15 – John Willes (judge), English lawyer (b. 1685)
- December 23 – Alestair Ruadh MacDonnell, Scottish Jacobite spy (b. c. 1725)
- December 25 – Princess Dorothea of Schleswig-Holstein-Sonderburg-Beck, German noble (b. 1685)
- date unknown – Aldegonde Jeanne Pauli, banker in the Austrian Netherlands (b. 1685)

1762

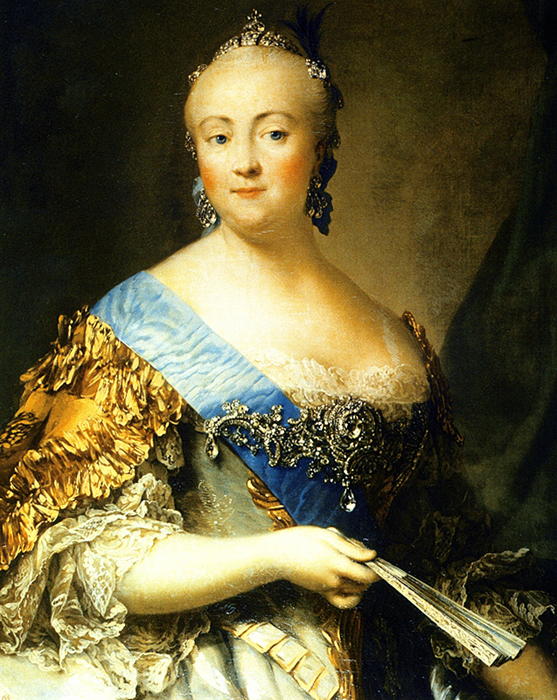
Elizabeth of Russia

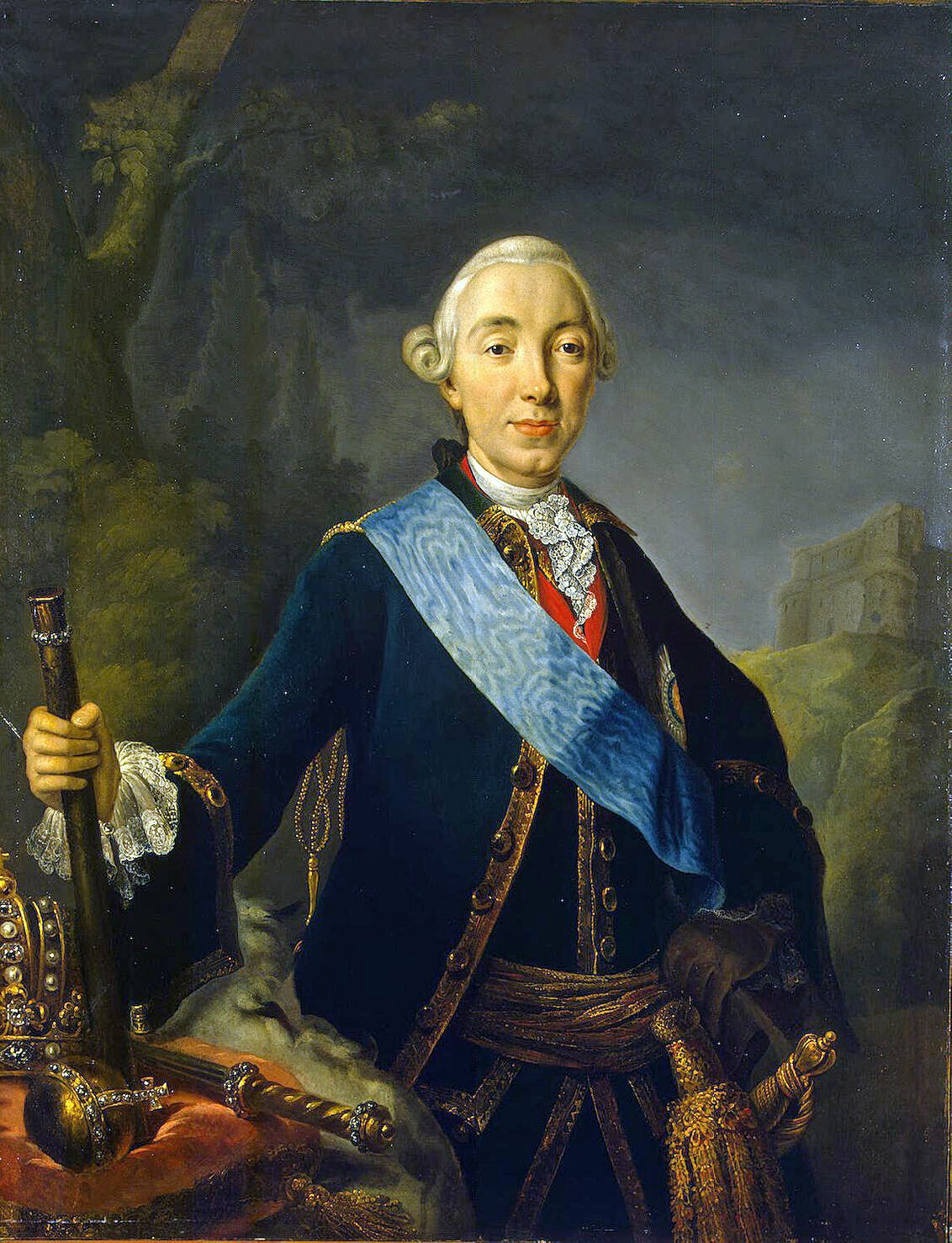
Peter III of Russia, nephew of Elizabeth.

- January 5 – Empress Elizabeth of Russia (b. 1709)
- January 7 – Manuel de Montiano, Spanish colonial administrator (b. 1685)
- January 11 – Louis-François Roubiliac, French sculptor (b. 1695)
- February 11 – Johann Tobias Krebs, German composer (b. 1690)
- February 12 – Laurent Belissen, French composer (b. 1693)
- February 20 – Tobias Mayer, German astronomer (b. 1723)
- March 4 – Johannes Zick, German fresco painter (b. 1702)
- March 18 – Paul II Anton, Prince Esterházy of Hungary (b. 1711)
- March 21 – Nicolas-Louis de Lacaille, French astronomer (b. 1713)
- April 1 – Germain Louis Chauvelin, French politician (b. 1685)
- May 15 – Michał Kazimierz "Rybeńko" Radziwiłł, Polish-Lithuanian noble (b. 1702)
- May 19 – Francesco Loredan, doge of Venice (b. 1685)
- May 21 – Alexander Joseph Sulkowski, Polish and Saxon general (b. 1695)
- May 26 – Alexander Gottlieb Baumgarten, German philosopher (b. 1714)
- June 13 – Dorothea Erxleben, German physician (b. 1715)
- June 17 – Prosper Jolyot de Crébillon, French writer (b. 1674)
- June 19 – Johann Ernst Eberlin, German composer (b. 1702)
- June 26 – Luise Gottsched, German poet, playwright, essayist and translator (b. 1713)
- July 12 – Prince Sado, son of Yeongjo of Joseon (b. 1735)
- July 13 – James Bradley, English Astronomer Royal (b. 1693)
- July 17 – Emperor Peter III of Russia (b. 1728)
- July 28 – George Dodington, 1st Baron Melcombe, English politician (b. 1691)
- July 31 – Luis Vicente de Velasco e Isla, Royal Spanish Navy sailor, commander (b. 1711)
- August 20 – Shah Waliullah, Islamic reformer (b. 1703)
- August 21 – Lady Mary Wortley Montagu, English writer (b. 1689)
- August 31 – Emperor Momozono of Japan (b. 1741)
- August 26 – John Fane, 7th Earl of Westmorland, British politician (b. 1685)
- September 17 – Francesco Geminiani, Italian composer (b. 1687)
- October 5 – John Olmius, 1st Baron Waltham of Ireland (b. 1711)
- October 6 – Francesco Manfredini, Italian composer (b. 1684)
- November 16 – John Boyle, 5th Earl of Cork, Irish writer (b. 1707)
- November 19 – Lord Robert Manners-Sutton, British politician (b. 1722)
- date unknown – William Moraley, English-American indentured servant and autobiographer (b. 1698)

1763

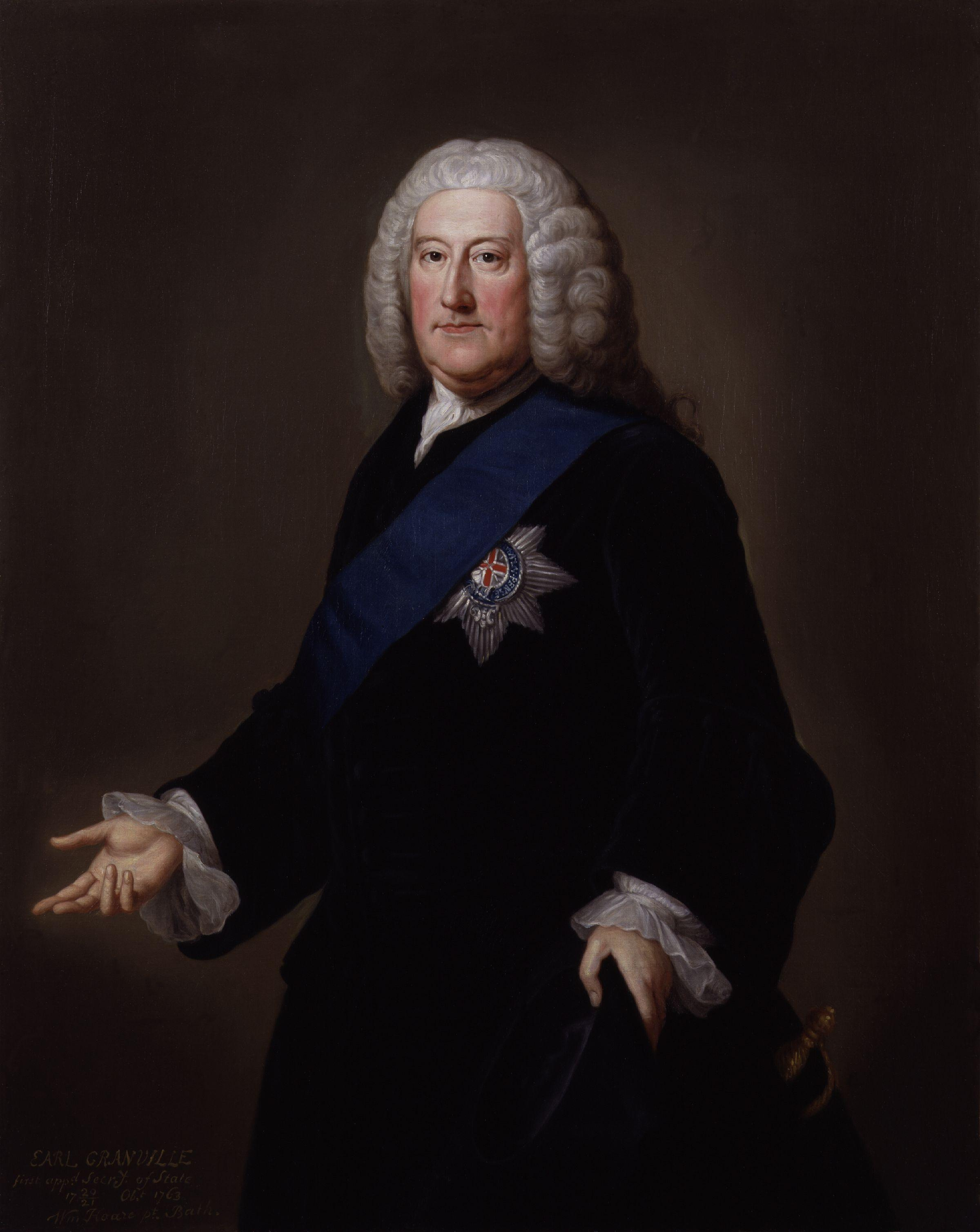
John Carteret, 2nd Earl Granville

- January 2 – John Carteret, 2nd Earl Granville, English statesman (b. 1690)
- January 11 – Caspar Abel, German theologian, historian, and poet (b. 1676)
- January 29 – Louis Racine, French poet (b. 1692)
- February 11 – William Shenstone, English poet (b. 1714)
- February 12 – Pierre de Marivaux, French writer (b. 1688)
- February 26 – Frederick, Margrave of Brandenburg-Bayreuth (b. 1711)
- March 2 – Antoine Walsh, Irish-French slave trader and Jacobite (b. 1703)
- March 4 – Johan Hörner, Danish artist (b. 1711)
- March 24 – Catherine Charlotte De la Gardie, Swedish countess (b. 1723)
- March 31 – Abraham Darby II, English ironmaster (b. 1711)
- April 8
  - Koca Ragıp Pasha, Ottoman (Turkish) Grand Vizier (b. 1698)
  - Ann Beddingfield, English mariticide, executed (b. 1742)
- April 13 – James Waldegrave, 2nd Earl Waldegrave of Great Britain (b. 1715)
- April 22 – Jared Eliot, Connecticut farmer, writer on horticulture (b. 1685)
- May 3 – George Psalmanazar, French-born impostor and English writer (b. c. 1679)
- June 29 – Hedvig Charlotta Nordenflycht, Swedish writer (b. 1718)
- August 14 – Giovanni Battista Somis, Italian violinist and composer (b. 1686)
- August 21 – Charles Wyndham, 2nd Earl of Egremont, British statesman (b. 1710)
- September 20 – Gabriela Silang, Filipina rebel leader, heroine (b. 1731)
- September 26 – John Byrom, English poet (b. 1692)
- October – Anna Maria Garthwaite, British designer (b. 1688)
- October 5 – Augustus, Elector of Saxony, King of Poland and Grand Duke of Lithuania (b. 1696)
- October 28 – Heinrich von Brühl, German statesman (b. 1700)
- November 10 – Joseph Dupleix – French governor general at Pondichéry (b. 1697)
- November 23 – Friedrich Heinrich von Seckendorff, German soldier (b. 1673)
- November 28 – Naungdawgyi, Burmese king (b. 1734)
- December 3 – Carl August Thielo, Danish composer (b. 1702)
- December 17 – Frederick Christian, Elector of Saxony (b. 1722)
- December 23 – Antoine François Prévost, French writer (b. 1697)

1764

Giuseppe Alessandro Furietti

- January 14 – Giuseppe Alessandro Furietti, Italian Catholic cardinal (b. 1685)
- March 6 – Philip Yorke, 1st Earl of Hardwicke, Lord Chancellor of England (b. 1690)
- March 16 – Frederick Augustus Rutowsky, German general (b. 1702)
- March 17 – George Parker, 2nd Earl of Macclesfield, English astronomer (b. c.1696)
- March 25 – Mikhail Mikhalovich Golitsyn, Russian naval officer (b. 1684)
- March 30 – Pietro Locatelli, Italian composer (b. 1695)
- April 9 – Marco Benefial, Italian painter (b. 1684)
- April 15 – Madame de Pompadour, mistress of King Louis XV (b. 1721)
- April 17 – Johann Mattheson, German composer (b. 1681)
- May 3 – Francesco Algarotti, Italian philosopher (b. 1712)
- June 29 – Ralph Allen, English businessman and politician (b. 1693)
- July 7 – William Pulteney, 1st Earl of Bath, English politician (b. 1683)

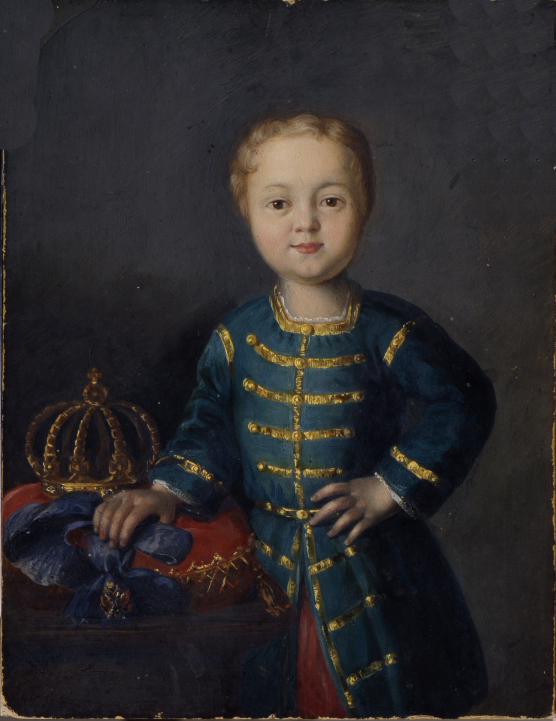
Tsar Ivan VI of Russia

- July 16 – Tsar Ivan VI of Russia (murdered in prison) (b. 1740)
- July 23 – Gilbert Tennent, Irish-born religious leader (b. 1703)
- September 2 – Nathaniel Bliss, English Astronomer Royal (b. 1700)
- September 12 – Jean-Philippe Rameau, French composer (b. 1683)
- September 23 – Robert Dodsley, English writer (b. 1703)
- September 26 – Benito Jerónimo Feijóo y Montenegro, Spanish scholar (b. 1676)

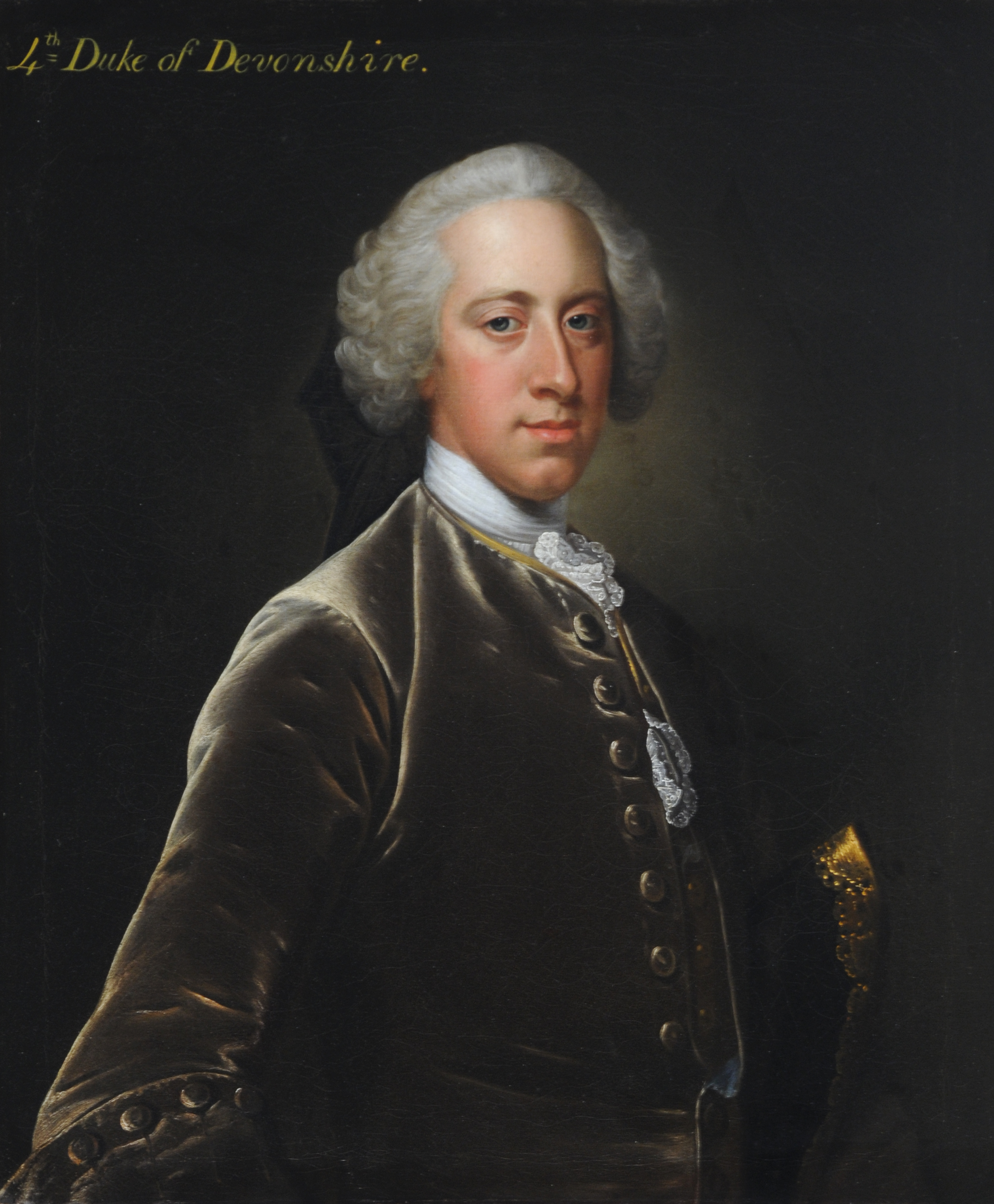
William Cavendish, 4th Duke of Devonshire

- October 2 – William Cavendish, 4th Duke of Devonshire, Prime Minister of Great Britain (b. 1720)
- October 22 – Jean-Marie Leclair, French composer and violinist (murdered) (b. 1697)
- October 23 – Emmanuel-Auguste de Cahideuc, Comte Dubois de la Motte, French naval officer (b. 1683)
- October 26 – William Hogarth, English painter and satirist (b. 1697)
- November 20 – Christian Goldbach, Prussian mathematician (b. 1690)
- November 27 – Aleksandr Aleksandrovich Menshikov, Russian army officer (b. 1714)

1765

- February 2 – Teresia Constantia Phillips, British autobiographer (b. 1709)
- February 4 – Jean-Jacques Blaise d'Abbadie, Director-general of the Colony of Louisiana (b. 1726)
- February 9 – Elisabetta de Gambarini, English composer (b. 1730)
- March 3 – William Stukeley, English archaeologist (b. 1687)
- March 27 – Arthur Dobbs, Irish politician and governor of the Royal Colony of North Carolina (b. 1689)

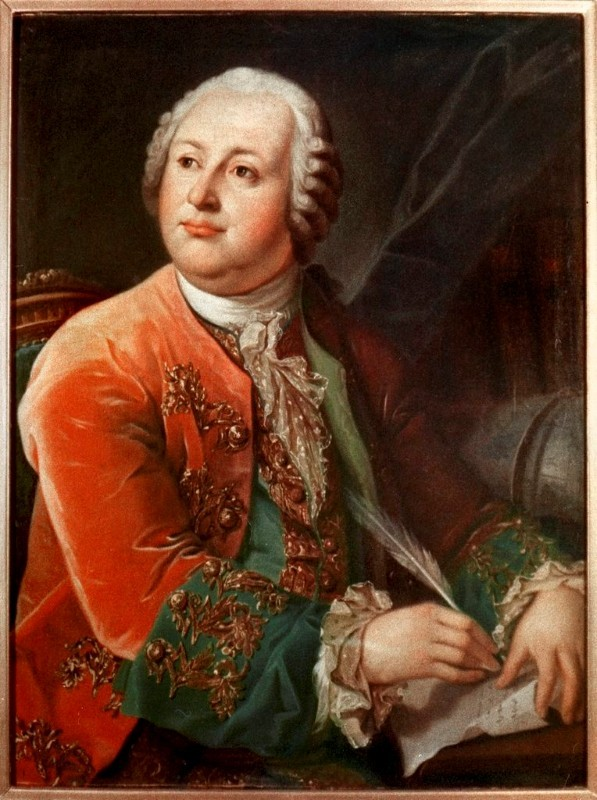
Mikhail Lomonosov

- April 5 – Edward Young, English poet (b. 1683)
- April 11 – Lewis Morris (1701–1765), Welsh hydrographer (b. 1701)
- April 15 – Mikhail Lomonosov, Russian author and scientist (b. 1711)
- April 20 – Abigail Williams, American accuser in the Salem witch trials (b. 1681)
- May 17 – Alexis Clairaut, French mathematician (b. 1713)
- June 21 – Nachman of Horodenka, Hasidic rabbi
- July 15 – Charles-André van Loo, French painter (b. 1705)
- July 18 – Philip, Duke of Parma, Spanish prince (b. 1720)
- August 17 – Timothy Cutler, rector of Yale College (b. 1684)
- August 18 – Francis I, Holy Roman Emperor (b. 1708)
- September 2 – Henry Bouquet, Swiss-born British army officer (b. 1719)
- September 26 – Jean-Baptiste Bénard de la Harpe, French explorer of North America (b. 1683)
- October 10 – Lionel Sackville, 1st Duke of Dorset, Lord Lieutenant of Ireland (b. 1688)
- October 21 – Giovanni Paolo Panini, Italian painter and architect (b. 1691)
- October 31 – Prince William, Duke of Cumberland, English military leader (b. 1721)
- November 30 – George Glas, Scottish merchant and adventurer (b. 1725)
- December 3 – Lord John Sackville, English cricketer (b. 1713)
- December 16 – Peter Frederick Haldimand, Swiss-born military officer and surveyor
- December 20 – Louis, Dauphin of France, heir apparent to the French throne (b. 1729)
- December 25 – Prokop Diviš, Czech scientist (b. 1698)

1766

- January 1 – James Francis Edward Stuart, The Old Pretender to the British throne (b. 1688)
- January 9 – Thomas Birch, English historian (b. 1705)
- January 14 – King Frederick V of Denmark (b. 1723)
- January 19 – Giovanni Niccolò Servandoni, French architect and painter (b. 1695)
- January 21 – James Quin, English actor (b. 1693)
- February 5 – Count Leopold Joseph von Daun, Austrian field marshal (b. 1705)
- February 23 – Stanisław Leszczyński, King of Poland (b. 1677)
- March 7 – Ercole Lelli, Italian painter of the late-Baroque (b. 1702)
- March 10 – Jane Colden, American botanist (b. 1724)
- April 4 – John Taylor, English classical scholar (b. 1704)
- April 7 – Tiberius Hemsterhuis, Dutch philologist, critic (b. 1685)
- May 5 – Jean Astruc, French physician, scholar (b. 1684)
- May 8 – Samuel Chandler, English non-conformist minister (b. 1693)
- May 20 – Malhar Rao Holkar, Indian nobleman (b. 1693)
- May 22 – Hedvig Strömfelt, Swedish psalm writer (b. 1723)
- June 13 – Isaac Norris (statesman), American politician (b. 1701)
- June 22 – Carlo Zimech, Maltese priest and painter (b. 1696)
- June 24 – Adrien Maurice de Noailles, 3rd Duke of Noailles, French soldier (b. 1678)
- July 9 – Jonathan Mayhew, American minister, patriot (b. 1720)
- July 11 – Elisabeth Farnese, queen of Philip V of Spain (b. 1692)
- July 14 – František Maxmilián Kaňka, Czech architect (b. 1674)
- July 17
  - Giuseppe Castiglione, Italian missionary to China (b. 1688)
  - Samuel Finley, American clergyman and educator (b. 1715)
- September 3 – Archibald Bower, Scottish historian (b. 1686)
- September 13 – Benjamin Heath, English classical scholar (b. 1704)
- September 23 – John Brown, English divine and author (b. 1715)
- November 7 – Jean-Marc Nattier, French painter (b. 1685)
- November 9 – Unico Wilhelm van Wassenaer, Dutch composer (b. 1692)
- December 12 – Johann Christoph Gottsched, German writer (b. 1700)

1767

- January 7 – Thomas Clap, first president of Yale University (b. 1703)
- January 22 – Johann Gottlob Lehmann, German mineralogist, geologist (b. 1719)
- February 15 – Mikhail Illarionovich Vorontsov, Russian noble, politician (b. 1714)
- March 7 – Jean-Baptiste Le Moyne, Sieur de Bienville, French colonizer and Governor of Louisiana (b. 1680)
- March 13 – Maria Josepha of Saxony, Dauphine of France (b. 1731) (tuberculosis)
- April 5 – Princess Charlotte Wilhelmine of Saxe-Coburg-Saalfeld, countess by marriage of Hanau-Münzenberg (b. 1685)
- April 7 – Franz Sparry, composer (b. 1715)
- May 26 – Prince Frederick Henry of Prussia (b. 1747) (smallpox)
- May 28 – Maria Josepha of Bavaria (b. 1739) (smallpox)
- June 12 – Florida Cevoli, Italian Capuchin Poor Clare and Blessed (b. 1685)
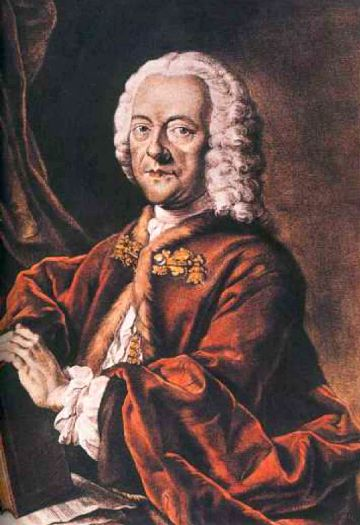
- Georg Philipp Telemann
  June 25 – Georg Philipp Telemann, German composer (b. 1681)
- July 13 – John Quincy, American Soldier (b. 1689)
- July 19 – John Carmichael, 3rd Earl of Hyndford (b. 1701)
- September 4 – Charles Townshend, English politician (b. 1725)
- October 15 – Archduchess Maria Josepha of Austria (b. 1751) (smallpox)
- October 16 – Burkhard Christoph von Münnich, Russian military leader (b. 1683)
- October 26 – Harry Pulteney, British politician (b. 1686)
- November 5 – John Reading (New Jersey governor), Colonial Governor of New Jersey (b. 1686)
- December 1 – Henry Erskine, 10th Earl of Buchan, British Freemason (b. 1710)
- December 22
  - Jacques Bridaine, French Catholic preacher and missionary (b. 1701)
  - John Newbery, English publisher (b. 1713)
- December 28 – Emer de Vattel, Swiss philosopher (b. 1714)
- date unknown
  - Firmin Abauzit, French scientist (b. 1679)
  - Blas María de la Garza Falcón, Spanish settler of Texas (b. 1712)
  - Marie Anne Victoire Pigeon, French mathematician (b. 1724)
  - Ana III of Matamba, African monarch

1768

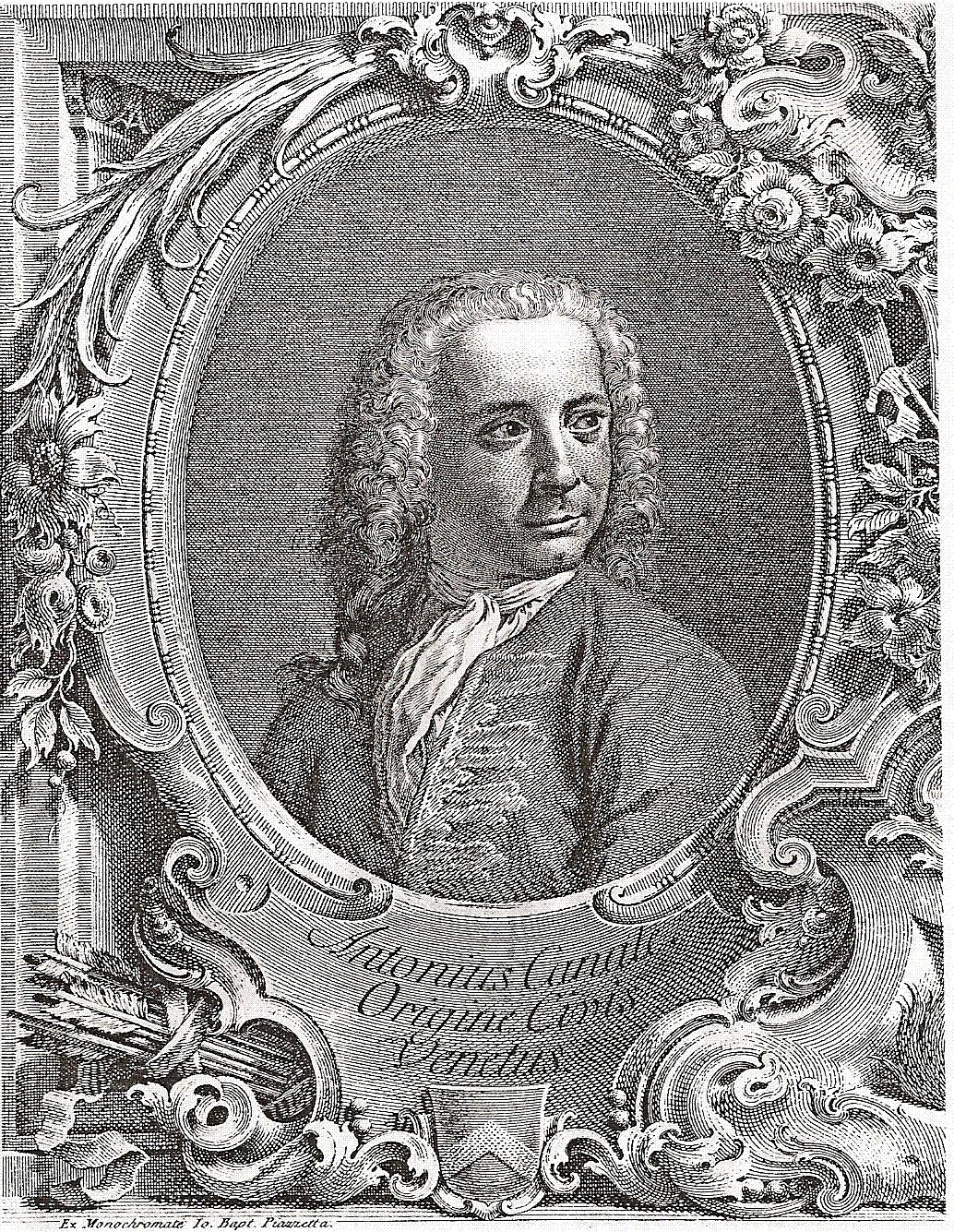
Canaletto

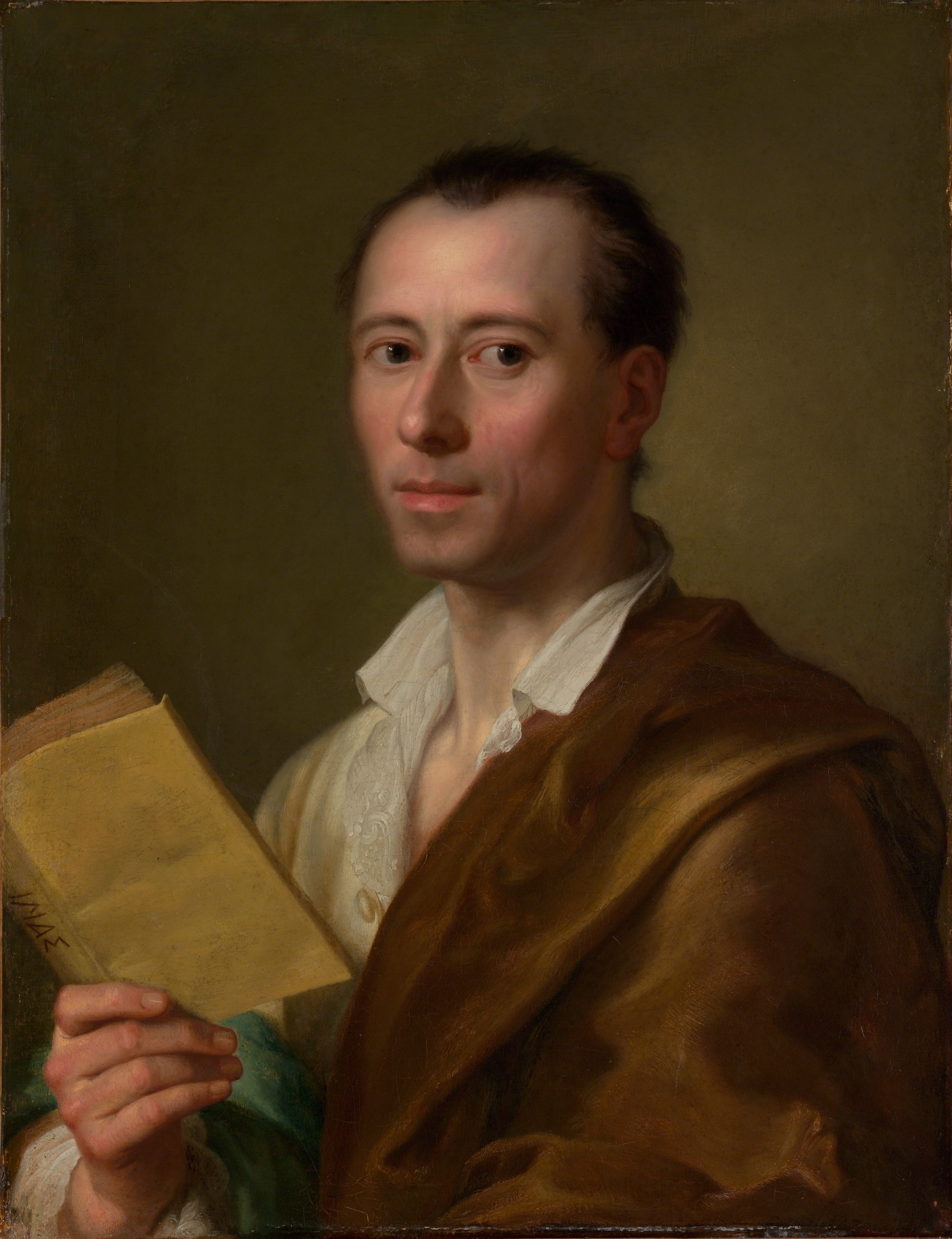
Johann Joachim Winckelmann

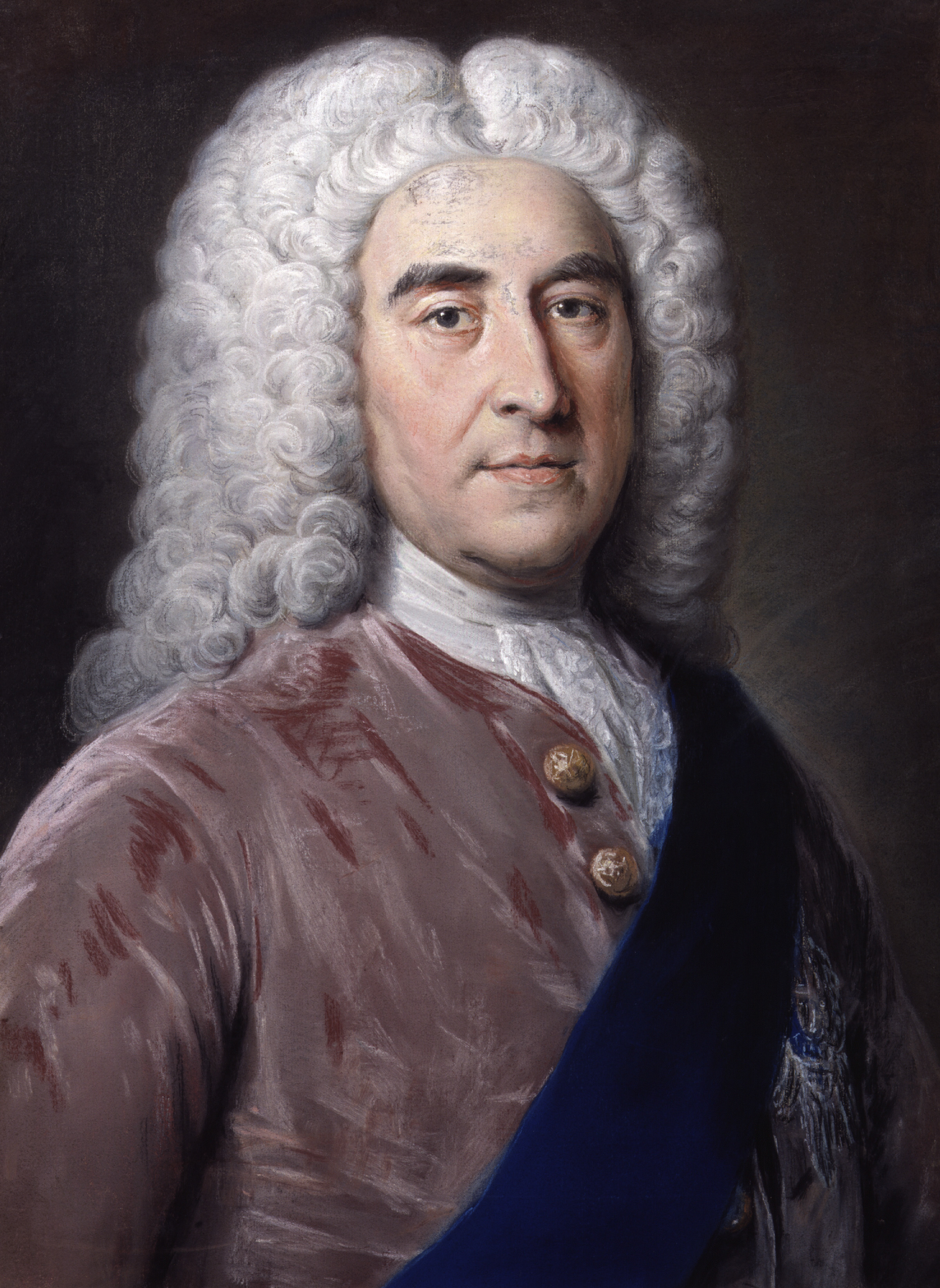
Thomas Pelham-Holles, 1st Duke of Newcastle

- January 20 – Sir Walter Bagot, 5th Baronet (b. 1702)
- February 1 – Sir Robert Rich, 4th Baronet, British cavalry officer (b. 1685)
- February 2 – Robert Smith, English mathematician (b. 1689)
- February 8 – George Dance the Elder, British architect (b. 1695)
- February 17 – Arthur Onslow, English politician (b. 1691)
- February 29 – John Mitchell, colonial American physician and botanist (b. 1711)
- March 1 – Hermann Samuel Reimarus, German philosopher, writer (b. 1694)
- March 3
  - Francis Fauquier, English statesman and Royal Governor of Virginia since 1758 (b. 1703)
  - Nicola Porpora, Italian composer (b. 1686)
- March 11 – Giovanni Battista Vaccarini, Italian architect (b. 1702)
- March 18 – Laurence Sterne, Irish writer (b. 1713)
- April 9 – Sarah Fielding, English writer (b. 1710)
- April 19 – Canaletto, Italian artist (b. 1697)
- April 29 – Georg Brandt, Swedish chemist, mineralogist (b. 1694)
- May 30 – Harry Grey, 4th Earl of Stamford, British earl and politician (b. 1715)
- June 8 – Johann Joachim Winckelmann, German classical scholar, archaeologist (b. 1717)
- June 15 – James Short, Scottish mathematician (b. 1710)
- June 19 – Benjamin Tasker, Provincial Governor of Maryland (b. 1690)
- June 28 – George Hadley, English lawyer and amateur meteorologist (b. 1685)
- July 6 – Conrad Beissel, German-born American religious leader (b. 1691)
- July 11 – José de Nebra, Spanish composer (b. 1702)
- July 24 – Nathaniel Lardner, English theologian (b. 1684)
- August 3 – Thomas Secker, Archbishop of Canterbury (b. 1693)
- August 17 – Vasily Trediakovsky, Russian poet (b. 1703)
- September 2 – Antoine Deparcieux, French mathematician (b. 1703)
- September 11 – Joseph-Nicolas Delisle, French astronomer (b. 1688)
- October 1 – Robert Simson, Scottish mathematician (b. 1687)
- October 8 – Pierre Simon Fournier, French typographer (b. 1712)
- October 17 – Louis VIII, Landgrave of Hesse-Darmstadt (b. 1691)
- October 28 – Michel Blavet, French flutist (b. 1700)
- October 31 – Francesco Maria Veracini, Italian composer (b. 1690)
- November 14 – John Bristow, English merchant, politician (b. 1701)
- November 16 – Hans von Lehwaldt, German general (b. 1685)
- November 17 – Thomas Pelham-Holles, 1st Duke of Newcastle, Prime Minister of Great Britain (b. 1693)
- December 8 – Jean Denis Attiret, French Jesuit missionary, painter (b. 1702)
- December 14 – Ulla Tessin, Swedish countess (b. 1711)
- December 20 – Carlo Innocenzo Frugoni, Italian poet (b. 1692)
- date unknown – Elsie Marley, English alewife (b. 1713)

1769

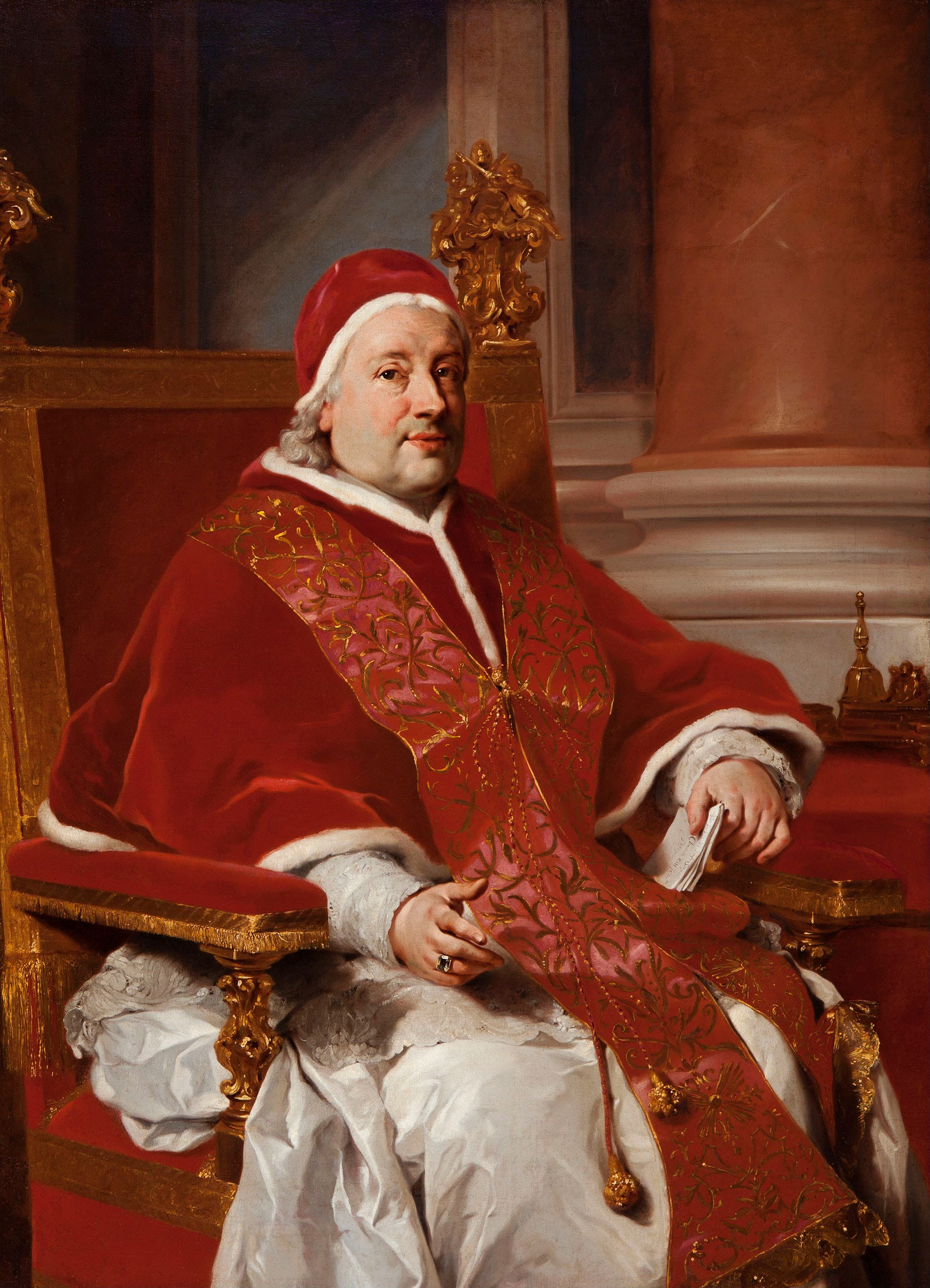
Pope Clement XIII

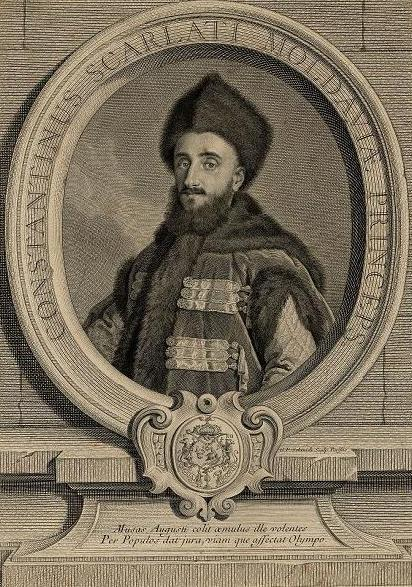
Prince Constantine Mavrocordatos

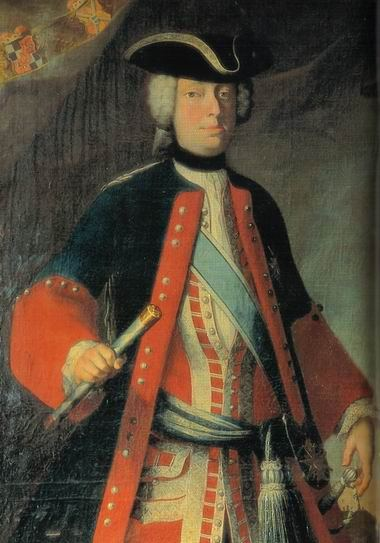
Joseph Friedrich Ernst, Prince of Hohenzollern-Sigmaringen

- January 5 – Charles Sackville, 2nd Duke of Dorset, English cricketer (b. 1711)
- February 2 – Pope Clement XIII (b. 1693)
- March 6 – Andrew Lauder, Burgess of the Royal Burgh of Lauder (1 August 1737) (b. 1702)
- March 28 – Johann Friedrich Endersch, German cartographer (b. 1705)
- April 5 – Marc-Antoine Laugier, French Jesuit priest, architectural theorist (b. 1713)
- April 13 – Anna Canalis di Cumiana, morganatic spouse of Victor Amadeus II of Savoy (b. 1680)
- April 20 – Chief Pontiac, Ottawa chief (murdered) (b. c. 1719)
- April 21 – John Gilbert Cooper, British poet and writer (b. 1722)
- May 14 – Iyoas I, Emperor of Ethiopia.
- June 1 – Edward Holyoke, American President of Harvard University (b. 1689)
- June 28 – Elisabeth Stierncrona, Swedish noble (b. 1714)
- August 1 – Jean-Baptiste Chappe d'Auteroche, French astronomer (b. 1722)
- August 2 – Daniel Finch, 8th Earl of Winchilsea, English politician (b. 1689)
- August 29 – Edmond Hoyle, English game expert (b. 1672)
- September 22 – Antonio Genovesi, Italian philosopher (b. 1712)
- September 23 – Michel Ferdinand d'Albert d'Ailly, French astronomer (b. 1714)
- September 27 – Anna Karolina Orzelska, Polish adventurer (b. 1707)
- November 3 – Diane Adélaïde de Mailly, third of the five famous French de Nesle sisters (b. 1713)
- November 16 – Henry Paget, 2nd Earl of Uxbridge (b. 1719)
- November 23 – Constantine Mavrocordatos, Prince of Wallachia and Prince of Moldavia (b. 1711)
- November 27 – Kamo no Mabuchi, Japanese poet, philologist (b. 1697)
- December 8 – Joseph Friedrich Ernst, Prince of Hohenzollern-Sigmaringen (b. 1702)
- December 13 – Christian Fürchtegott Gellert, German poet (b. 1715)
- December 30 – Nicholas Taaffe, 6th Viscount Taaffe, Austrian soldier (b. 1685)
- date unknown
  - King Suremphaa of Assam
  - Birgitte Sofie Gabel, Danish noble (b. 1746)
