= 1698 =

Calendar year

1698 in various calendars
- Gregorian calendar: 1698; MDCXCVIII
- Ab urbe condita: 2451
- Armenian calendar: 1147; ԹՎ ՌՃԽԷ
- Assyrian calendar: 6448
- Balinese saka calendar: 1619–1620
- Bengali calendar: 1104–1105
- Berber calendar: 2648
- English Regnal year: 10 Will. 3 – 11 Will. 3
- Buddhist calendar: 2242
- Burmese calendar: 1060
- Byzantine calendar: 7206–7207
- Chinese calendar: 丁丑年 (Fire Ox); 4395 or 4188 — to — 戊寅年 (Earth Tiger); 4396 or 4189
- Coptic calendar: 1414–1415
- Discordian calendar: 2864
- Ethiopian calendar: 1690–1691
- Hebrew calendar: 5458–5459
- Hindu calendars
- Vikram Samvat: 1754–1755
- Shaka Samvat: 1619–1620
- Kali Yuga: 4798–4799
- Holocene calendar: 11698
- Igbo calendar: 698–699
- Iranian calendar: 1076–1077
- Islamic calendar: 1109–1110
- Japanese calendar: Genroku 11 (元禄１１年)
- Javanese calendar: 1621–1622
- Julian calendar: Gregorian minus 10 days
- Korean calendar: 4031
- Minguo calendar: 214 before ROC 民前214年
- Nanakshahi calendar: 230
- Thai solar calendar: 2240–2241
- Tibetan calendar: མེ་མོ་གླང་ལོ་ (female Fire-Ox); 1824 or 1443 or 671 — to — ས་ཕོ་སྟག་ལོ་ (male Earth-Tiger); 1825 or 1444 or 672

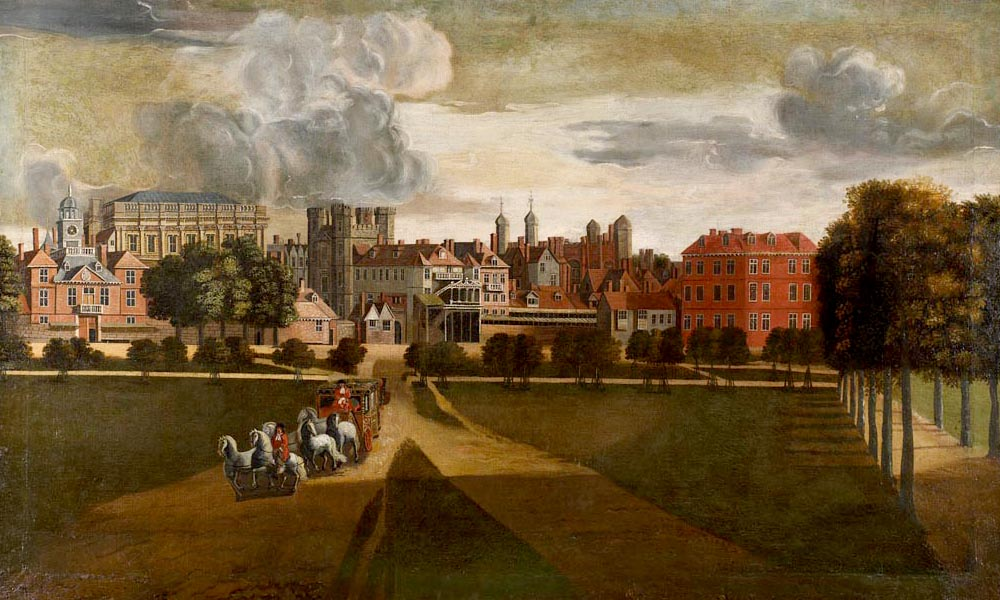
January 4: In England, the Palace of Whitehall is destroyed by fire.

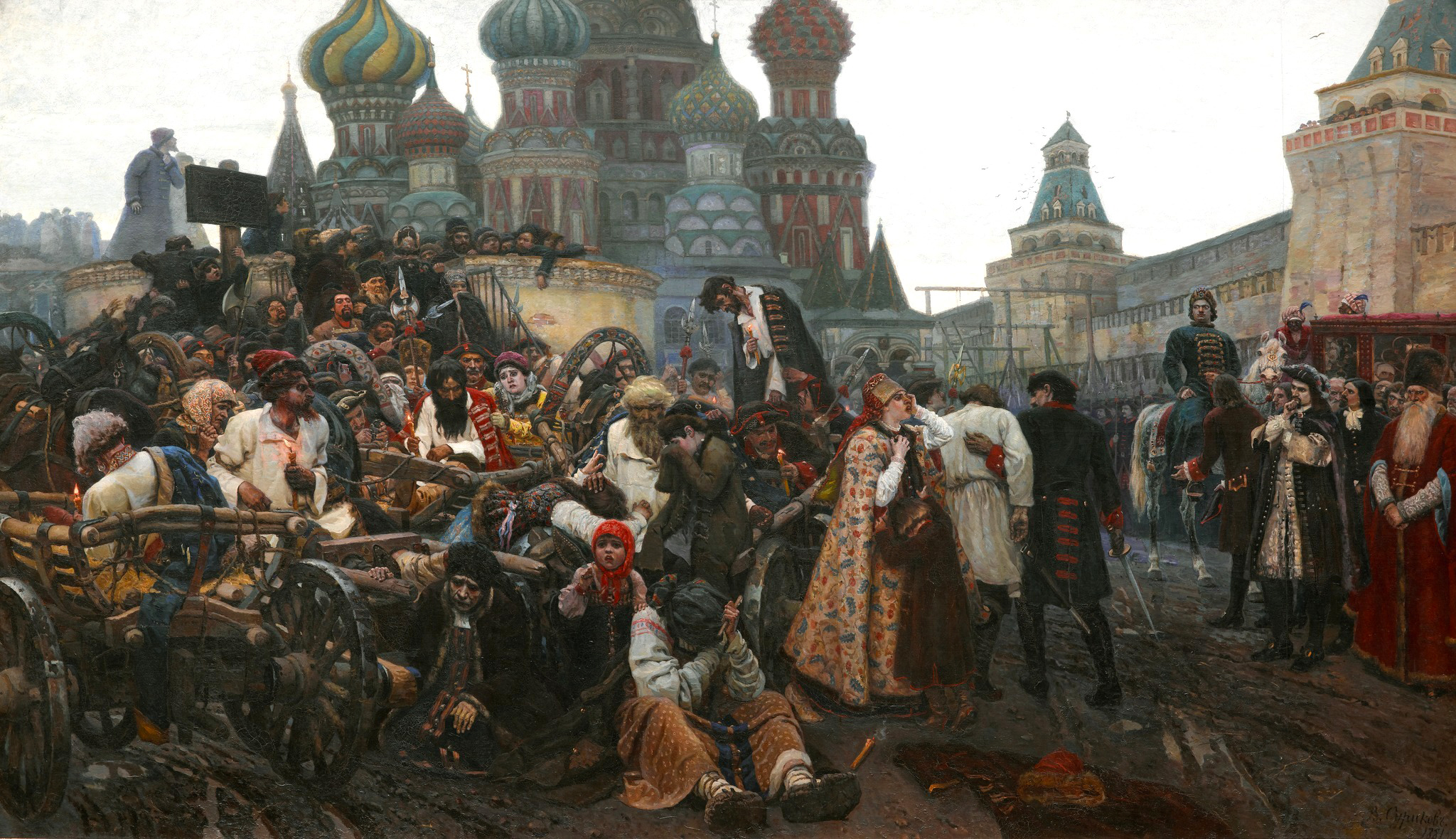
June 22: Executions of 57 leaders of the Streltsy uprising begin in Russia and last for seven days (1881 painting by Vasily Surikov)

1698 (MDCXCVIII) was a common year starting on Wednesday of the Gregorian calendar and a common year starting on Saturday of the Julian calendar, the 1698th year of the Common Era (CE) and Anno Domini (AD) designations, the 698th year of the 2nd millennium, the 98th year of the 17th century, and the 9th year of the 1690s decade. As of the start of 1698, the Gregorian calendar was 10 days ahead of the Julian calendar, which remained in localized use until 1923.

== Events ==
=== January–March ===
- January 1 – The Abenaki tribe and Massachusetts colonists sign a treaty, ending the conflict in New England.
- January 4 – The Palace of Whitehall in London, England is destroyed by fire.
- January 8 – The Maratha Empire fort at Gingee falls after a siege of almost nine years by the Mughal Empire as King Rajaram escapes to safety. General Swarup Singh Bundela, who led the scaling of the fortress walls and Gingee's capture, is rewarded by Mughal Emperor Aurangzeb with command of the area.
- January 23 – George Louis becomes Elector of Hanover upon the death of his father, Ernest Augustus. Because the widow of Ernest Augustus, George's mother Sophia, was heiress presumptive as the cousin of Anne, Queen of Great Britain, and Anne's closest eligible heir, George will become King of Great Britain.
- January 30 – William Kidd, who initially seized foreign ships under authority as a privateer for the British Empire before becoming a pirate, becomes an outlaw and uses his ship, the Adventure Galley, to capture an Indian ship, the valuable Quedagh Merchant, near India.
- March 8 – The Society for Promoting Christian Knowledge, the oldest Anglican mission organization in the world, is founded by English clergyman Thomas Bray and four other people at Lincoln's Inn in London, along with Sir Humphrey Mackworth, Maynard Colchester, Lord Guilford and John Hooke.
- March
  - English Bishop Jeremy Collier publishes his pamphlet A Short View of the Immorality and Profaneness of the English Stage, accusing several contemporary playwrights of undermining public morality in their popular comedies by using profanity, blasphemy and indecency.
  - Samuel Cranston becomes the governor of the Colony of Rhode Island and Providence Plantations.

=== April–June ===
- April 1 – Scottish pirate William Kidd and his crew arrive at Île Sainte-Marie off of the coast of Madagascar in Kidd's Adventure Galley bringing with them the cargo of the captured ships Quedagh Merchant and Rouparelle. Upon arrival, all but 13 of Kidd's crew desert to work for another pirate, Robert Culliford. The Adventure Galley, which is leaking and falling apart, sinks and the Rouparelle is sunk by the deserters. Kidd and his 13 henchmen depart on Quedah Merchant.
- April 10 – A total solar eclipse is visible in Central America.
- May 1 – The Banishment Act of 1697 goes into effect for Roman Catholic church officials in Ireland, having been the deadline for all "popish archbishops, bishops, vicars general, deans, jesuits, monks, friars, and other regular popish clergy" to have reported to Irish ports for deportation. Re-entry to Ireland after May 4, 1698, is a criminal offense with a penalty of 12 months imprisonment and expulsion, while a second re-entry is punishable by death as treason.
- May 4 – At the imperial capital at Inwa, Sanay Min of the Toungoo dynasty becomes the new King of Burma upon the death of his father, Minye Kyawhtin.
- May 17 – The British Royal Navy ship HMS Hastings, a 32-gun fifth rate, is launched.
- June 20 – An earthquake of magnitude 7.2–7.9 damages an extended region around Ambato, Ecuador, including the Tungurahua, Cotopaxi and Chimborazo provinces. Ambato and Latacunga are completely destroyed and several thousand casualties are reported.
- June 21 – John Churchill, Earl of Marlborough is reinstated in the English Army, with readmission to the Privy Council by King William III. On July 26, he is selected as one of the Lords Justice.
- June 22 – The executions of 57 leaders of the Streltsy uprising begin and continue until June 28.
- June 24 – The Trade with Africa Act 1697 goes into effect in English overseas possessions, ending the monopoly of the Royal African Company (RAC) on the triangular trade by opening it to any English merchants who pay a 10 percent fee to the RAC.

=== July–September ===
- July 2 – Thomas Savery patents the first steam engine.
- July 7 – The English House of Commons is dissolved and new elections are held between July 19 and August 10 for a parliament to be summoned on August 24.
- July 14 – Darien scheme: The first Scottish settlers leave for an ill-fated colony in Panama.
- July 25 – English engineer Thomas Savery obtains a patent for a steam pump.
- August 24 – King William III opens the newly elected House of Commons at Westminster.
- August 25 – Peter the Great arrives back in Moscow; General Patrick Gordon has already crushed the Streltsy Uprising, with 341 rebels sentenced to be decapitated.
- September 5
  - In an effort to move his people away from Asiatic customs, Tsar Peter I of Russia imposes a beard tax.
  - A charter is granted by King William III of England to the new East India Company of England, called "the New Company" or "the English Company" to break the monopoly that has existed in India since 1689 with the existing British East India Company.
- September 8 – The Polish–Lithuanian Commonwealth defeats the Tatars in the Battle of Podhajce, the last battle between the Ottoman Empire and the Polish and Lithuanians.

=== October–December ===
- October 11 – The Treaty of the Hague is signed between the Dutch Republic, England and France.
- October 24 – Iberville and Bienville sail from Brest to the Gulf of Mexico, to defend the southern borders of New France.
- November 2 – The Darien scheme Scottish settlers land in Panama and establish their ill-fated colony; 80% of them would die within the first year.
- November 14
  - The first Eddystone Lighthouse, built off Plymouth, England, is illuminated.
  - The Spanish king Carlos names his grandson Jozef Ferdinand as his heir.
- November 16 – A congress begins in Sremski Karlovci to discuss a treaty between the Ottoman Empire and the Holy League.
- November – Tani Jinzan, astronomer and calendar scholar, observes a fire destroy Tosa (now Kōchi) in Japan at the same time as a Leonid meteor shower, taking it as evidence to reinforce belief in the "Theory of Areas".
- December 8 – King William III of England issues a proclamation of "our most gracious pardon unto all such pirates in the East Indies, viz., all eastward of the Cape of Good Hope, who shall surrender themselves for piracies or robberies committed by them upon sea or land" before April 30, 1699, to Captain Thomas Warren, but specifically "excepting Henry Every, alias Bridgman, and William Kidd.
- December 9 – Francis Nicholson becomes the new British colonial governor of Virginia, succeeding Sir Edmund Andros.
- December 12 – Mombasa (referred to at the time as Fort Jesus, and now part of Kenya) falls under control of the Emirate of Oman, with Imam Sa'if ibn Sultan as the first Omani Governor.

=== Date unknown ===
- Bucharest becomes the capital of Wallachia (part of modern-day Romania).
- In Africa, Zanzibar is captured by Oman.
- The Whigs sponsor Captain Kidd of New York as a privateer against French shipping.
- Humphrey Hody is appointed regius professor of Greek at Oxford.
- Shepherd Neame Brewery founded.
- Ukraine suffers a great famine.
- Cinderella is made as a folktale

== Births ==
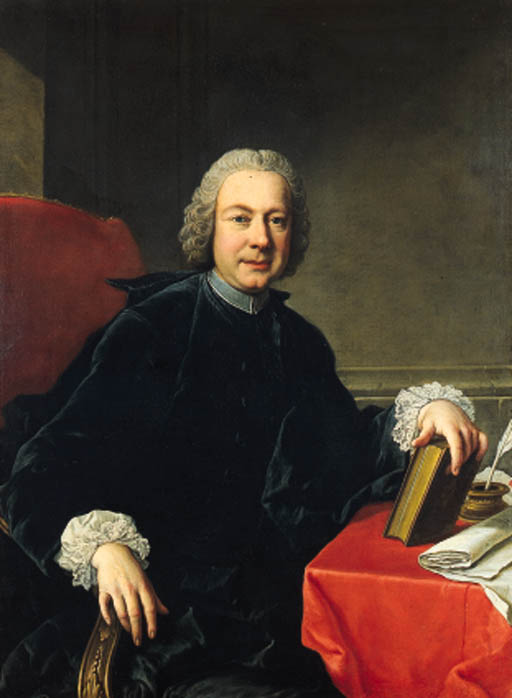
Pietro Metastasio born 3 January

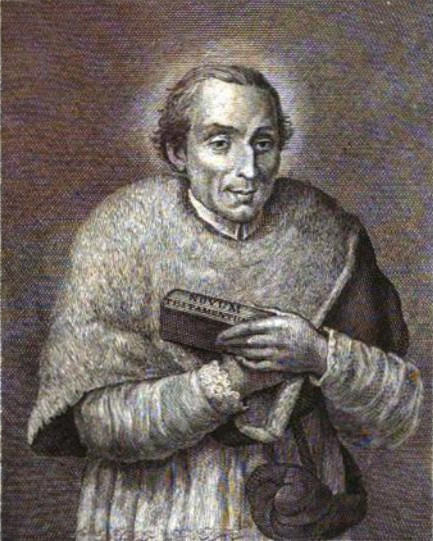
Giovanni Battista de' Rossi born 22 February

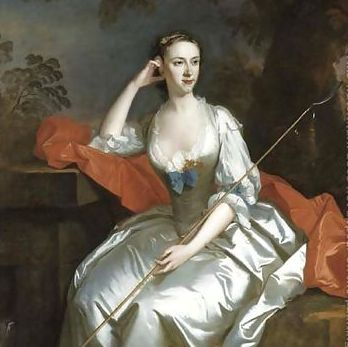
Lady Jane Douglas born 17 March

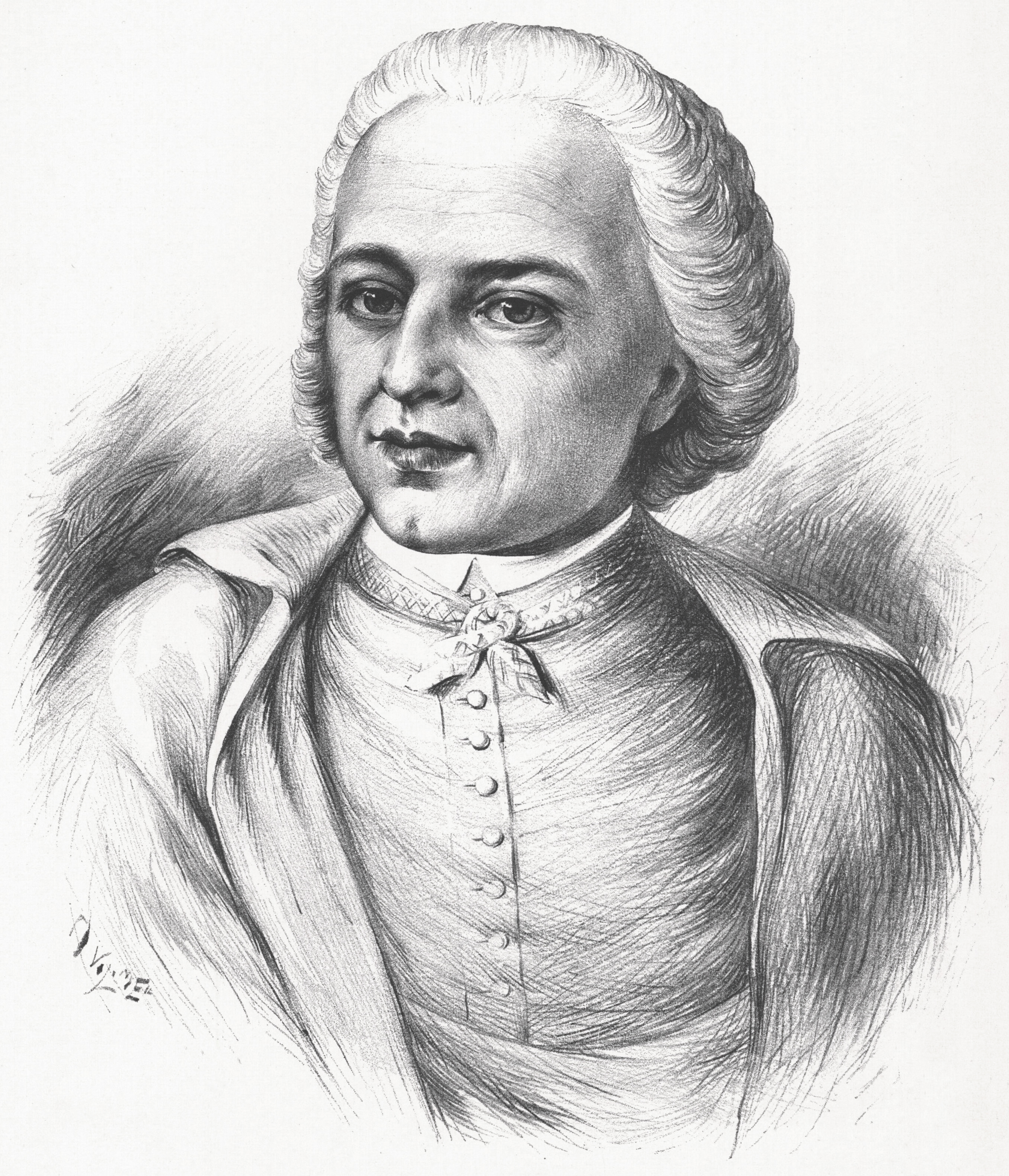
Prokop Diviš born 26 March

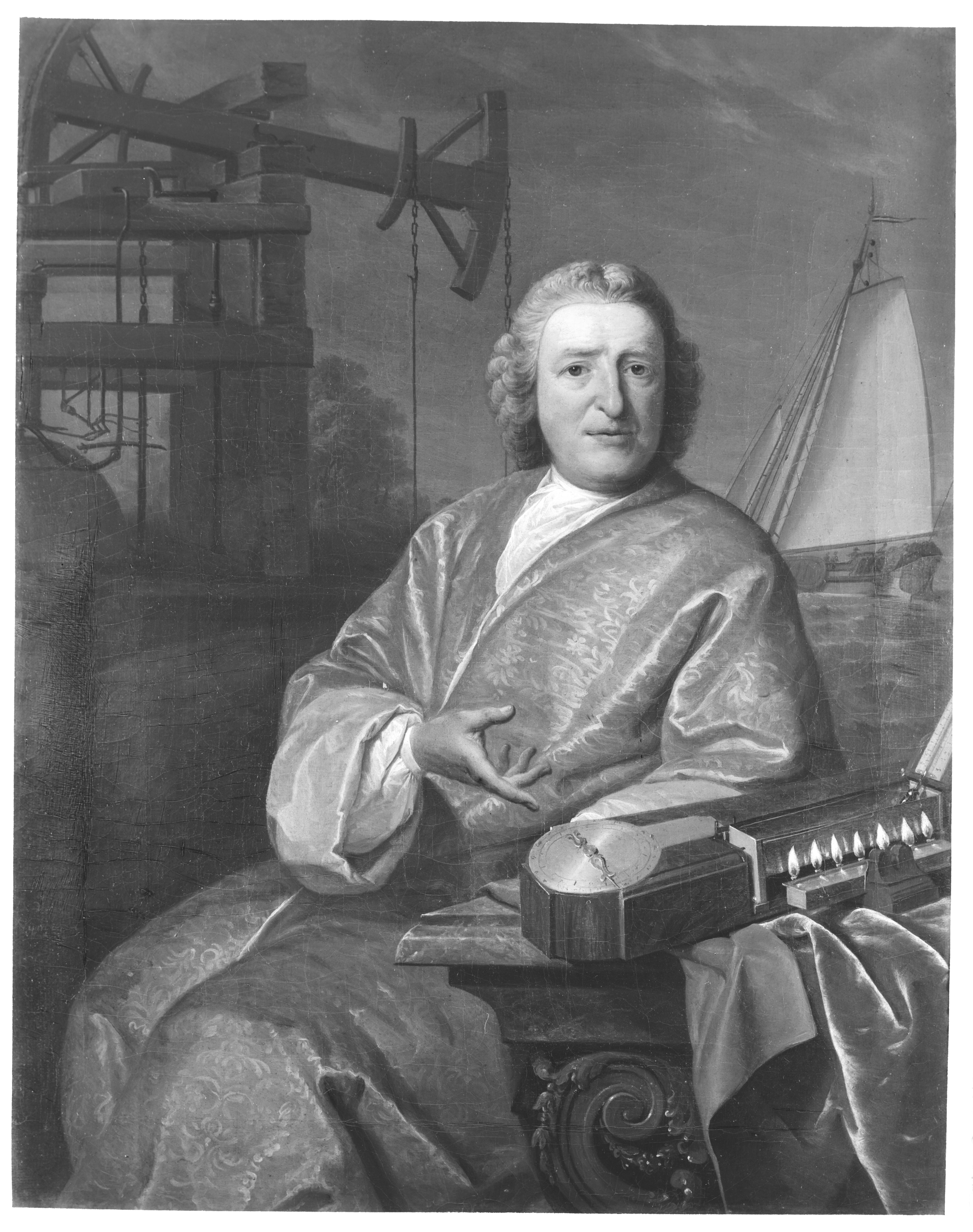
Steven Hoogendijk born 1 April

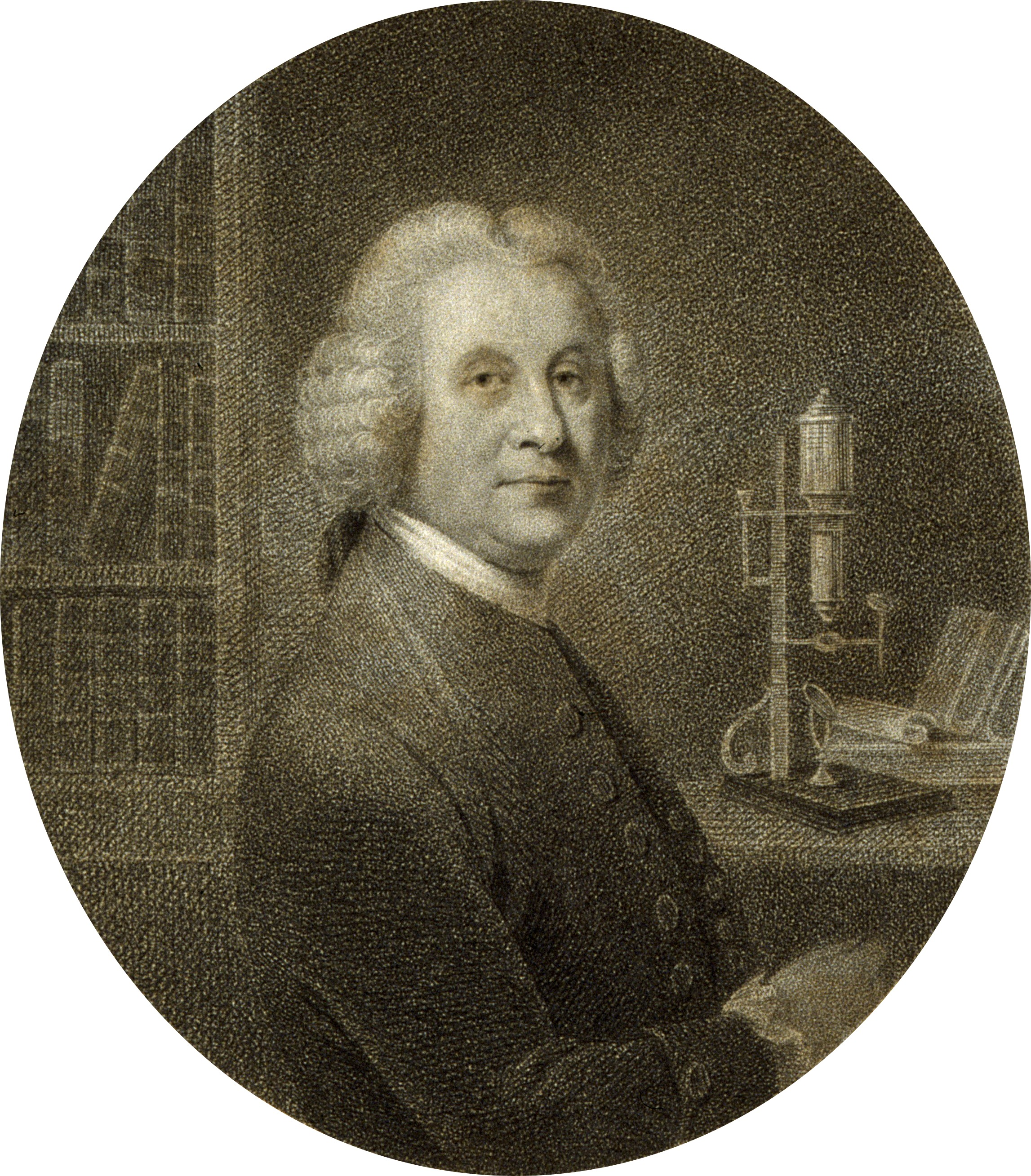
Henry Baker (naturalist) born 8 May

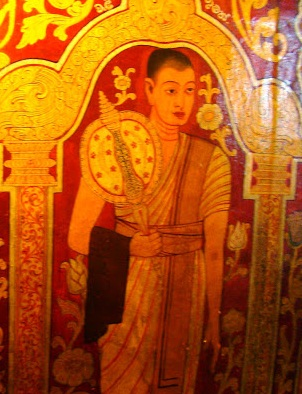
Weliwita Sri Saranankara Thero born 19 June

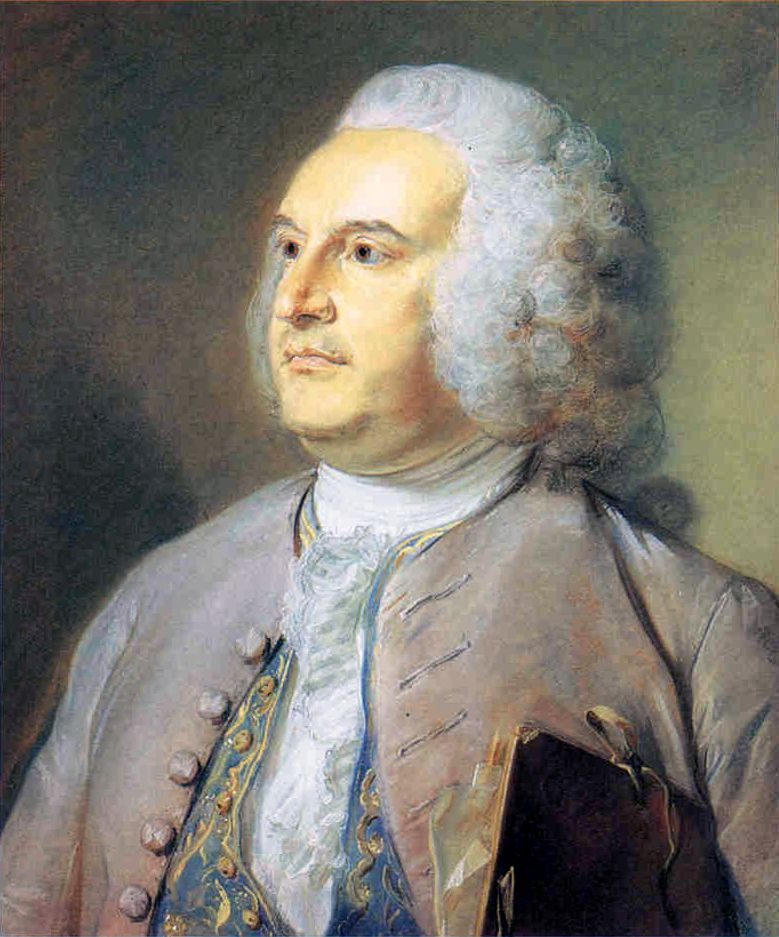
Jean-Michel Chevotet born 11 July

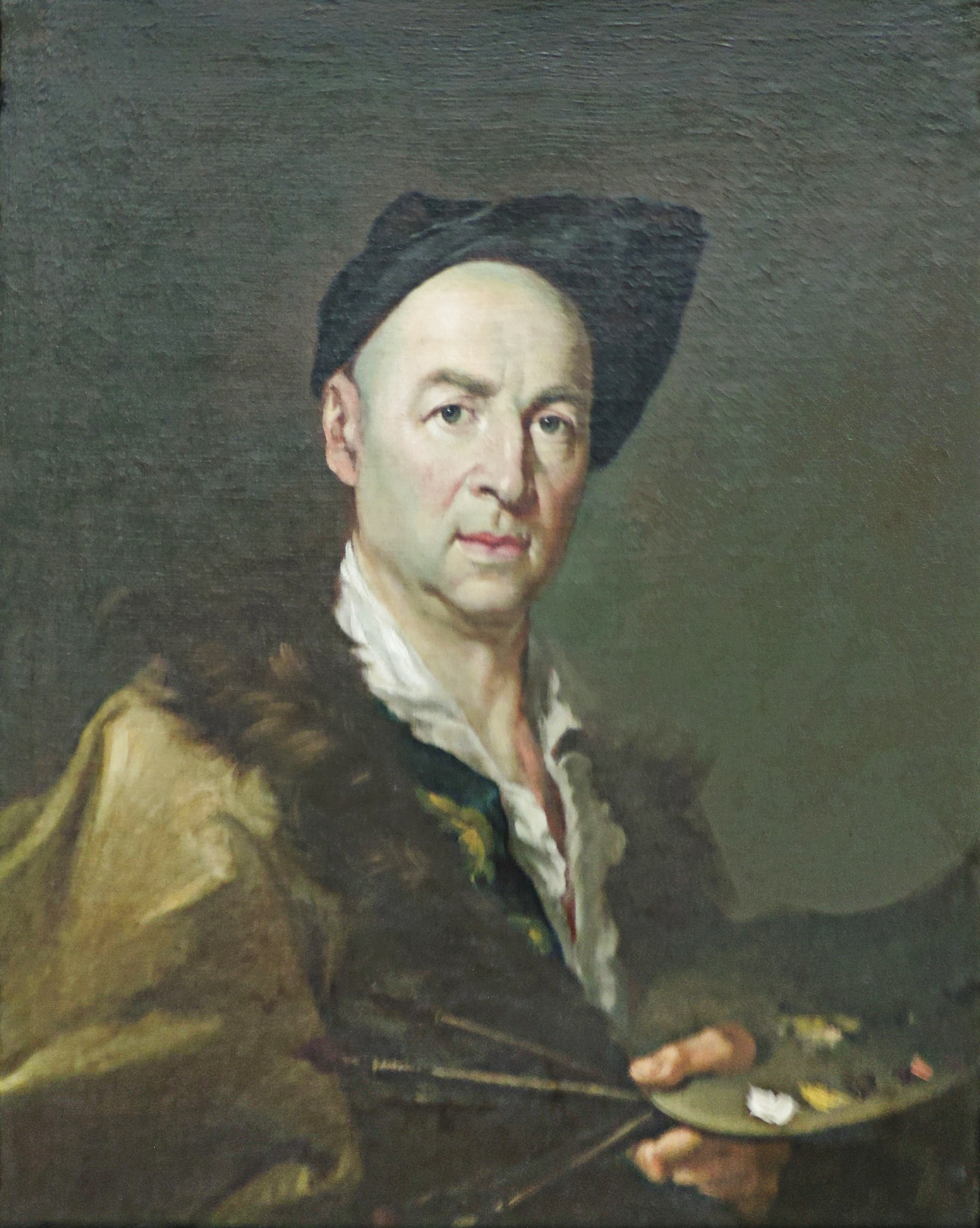
Giacomo Ceruti born 13 October

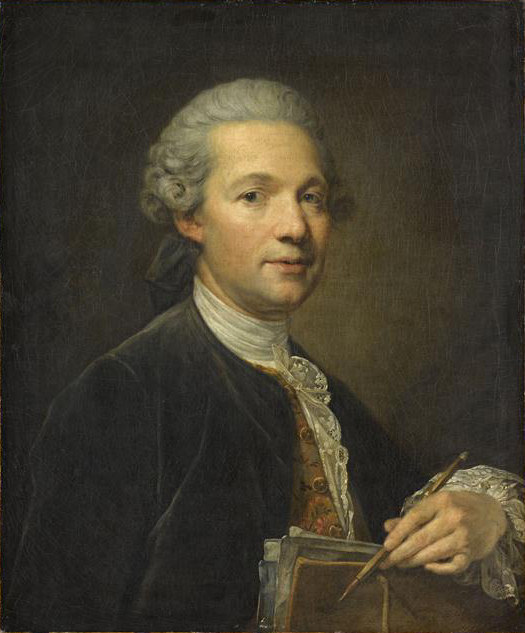
Ange-Jacques Gabriel born 23 October

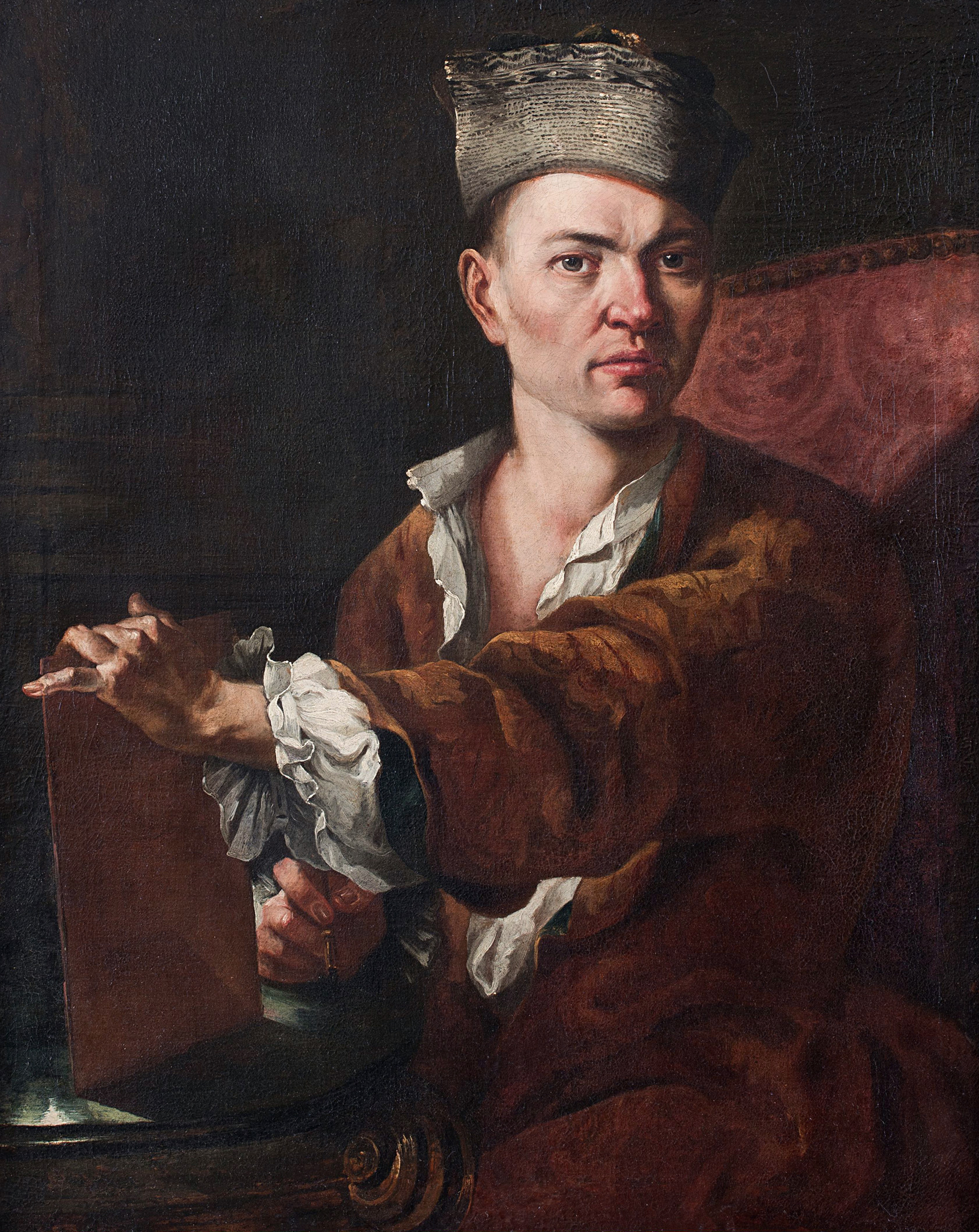
Paul Troger born 30 October

=== January–March ===
- January 1 – Leonardo VII Tocco, Italian noble, the Prince of Montemiletto and the titular Prince of Achaea (d. 1776)
- January 3 – Metastasio, (b. Pietro Antonio Domenico Trapassi), Italian poet and opera librettist (d. 1782)
- January 7 – Thomas Southwell, 2nd Baron Southwell, Irish peer, politician and freemason (d. 1766)
- January 21 – Auguste Louise of Württemberg-Oels, Duchess of Württemberg-Oels by birth and by marriage Duchess of Saxe-Weissenfels-Barby (d. 1739)
- February 4 – Heinrich August de la Motte Fouqué, Prussian Lieutenant general and General der Infanterie and a confidant of King Frederick the Great (d. 1774)
- February 5 – Germain-François Poullain de Saint-Foix, 18th-century French writer and playwright (d. 1776)
- February 7 – Nicolas Sarrabat, French mathematician and scientist (d. 1739)
- February 16
  - Pierre Bouguer, French mathematician, geophysicist, geodesist, and astronomer (d. 1758)
  - Johann Elias Ridinger, German painter (d. 1767)
- February 19 – William FitzRoy, 3rd Duke of Cleveland, English nobleman (d. 1774)
- February 20
  - Gerard Arnout Hasselaer, burgomaster and counsellor of the city of Amsterdam (d. 1766)
  - Bernardo Tanucci, Italian statesman (d. 1783)
- February 22 – Giovanni Battista de' Rossi, Italian Roman Catholic priest (d. 1764)
- February 23 – Thomas Bladen, colonial governor in North America and British MP (d. 1780)
- February 28 – Sigismund von Schrattenbach, Prince-Archbishop of Salzburg (d. 1771)
- March 6 – Johannes Alberti, Dutch theologian (d. 1762)
- March 17 – Lady Jane Douglas, Scottish noblewoman (d. 1753)
- March 26 – Václav Prokop Diviš, Czech priest, scientist and inventor (d. 1765)

=== April–June ===
- April 1 – Steven Hoogendijk, Rotterdam watch and instrument maker and physicist (d. 1788)
- April 2 – Henry Edgar, Scottish Episcopal minister, Bishop of Fife from 1762 to 1765 (d. 1765)
- April 5 – Anne Hamilton, 2nd Countess of Ruglen, Scottish noblewoman (d. 1748)
- April 19 – Daniel Gerdes, German Calvinist theologian and historian (d. 1765)
- April 28 – John Phillipson, British Navy administrator, commissioner, MP for over 20 years (d. 1756)
- May 1 – Francesco Robba, Italian sculptor (d. 1757)
- May 8 – Henry Baker, British naturalist (d. 1774)
- May 10
  - Cuthbert Ellison, British Army officer and MP for Shaftesbury (d. 1785)
  - François Parfaict, 18th-century French theatre historian (d. 1753)
- May 11 – Pierre Contant d'Ivry, French architect and designer (d. 1777)
- May 17
  - Gio Nicola Buhagiar, Maltese painter (d. 1752)
  - Sir John Major, 1st Baronet, British merchant (d. 1781)
- May 22 – Lord William Beauclerk, British army officer and politician (d. 1733)
- May 24 – John, Count Palatine of Gelnhausen (d. 1780)
- June 2 – Henry Miles, English Dissenting minister, scientific writer, Fellow of the Royal Society (d. 1763)
- June 15 – George Browne, Irish soldier of fortune in Russian service (d. 1792)
- June 19
  - Aoki Konyō, Confucian scholar (d. 1769)
  - Weliwita Sri Saranankara Thero, Last Sangharaja of Sri Lanka (d. 1778)
- June 22 – Charles-Hugues Le Febvre de Saint-Marc, 18th-century French playwright and homme de lettres (d. 1769)
- June 23 – Lord Nassau Powlett, English army officer and MP (d. 1741)

=== July–September ===
- July 8 – Nicolò Maria Antonelli, Italian Cardinal in the Roman Catholic Church (d. 1767)
- July 11
  - Jean-Michel Chevotet, French architect (d. 1772)
  - George Turnbull, Scottish philosopher (d. 1748)
- July 17 – Pierre Louis Moreau de Maupertuis, French mathematician (d. 1759)
- July 19
  - Johann Jakob Bodmer, Swiss author (d. 1783)
  - John Clavering, English MP and Groom of the Bedchamber at the Court of George II (d. 1762)
- July 24 – František Jiránek, Czech (Bohemian) Baroque composer (d. 1778)
- August 18 – Samuel Klingenstierna, Swedish mathematician and scientist (d. 1765)
- August 20 – Louis Fornel, Canadian merchant (d. 1745)
- August 24 – Erik Pontoppidan, Danish author (d. 1764)
- August 29
  - Richard Pearsall, English Congregationalist minister, friend of Philip Doddridge (d. 1762)
  - Jacob Vernet, prominent theologian in Geneva (d. 1789)
- September 6 – Jean Thurel, French soldier (d. 1807)
- September 8
  - François Francoeur, French composer and violinist (d. 1787)
  - Friederike Charlotte of Hesse-Darmstadt, princess of Hesse-Darmstadt and through her marriage a princess of Hesse-Kassel (d. 1777)
- September 14 – Charles François de Cisternay du Fay, French chemist and superintendent of the Jardin du Roi (d. 1739)
- September 15 – Pier Francesco Guala, Italian painter (d. 1757)
- September 23 – Lewis Morris, colonial American judge (d. 1762)
- September 26 – William Cavendish, 3rd Duke of Devonshire, British nobleman, Whig politician and MP (d. 1755)
- September 28 – Joachim Christian von Tresckow, Prussian Lieutenant General (d. 1762)

=== October–December ===
- October 6 – François-Bernard Lépicié, 18th-century French engraver (d. 1755)
- October 7 – Henry Madin, French composer at the Chapelle royale (d. 1748)
- October 12 – Jean Paul Timoléon de Cossé-Brissac, Marshal of France (d. 1784)
- October 13 – Giacomo Ceruti, Italian late Baroque painter (d. 1767)
- October 23
  - Ange-Jacques Gabriel, principal architect of King Louis XV of France (d. 1782)
  - John Jortin, English church historian (d. 1770)
- October 30
  - Peter Thompson, English merchant (d. 1770)
  - Paul Troger, Austrian painter (d. 1762)
- November 4 – Caleb Fleming, English dissenting minister and Polemicist (d. 1779)
- November 6 – Sir Alexander Lauder, 4th Baronet (d. 1730)
- November 8 – Alberico Archinto, Italian cardinal and papal diplomat (d. 1758)
- November 10 – Maria Taylor Byrd, colonial woman who managed her and her husband William Byrd II's Westover Plantation when he was absent (d. 1771)
- November 22 – Pierre de Rigaud, marquis de Vaudreuil-Cavagnial, Canadian-born colonial governor of French Canada in North America (d. 1778)
- November 23 – Jacob Johann Köhler, Estonian printer who published the first Estonian-language Bible in 1739 (d. 1757)
- November 24 – Charles Douglas, 3rd Duke of Queensberry, Scottish nobleman, extensive landowner, Privy Counsellor, Vice Admiral of Scotland (d. 1778)
- November 28 – Charlotta Frölich, Swedish agronomist (d. 1770)
- December 2 – Oliver Legipont, German Benedictine bibliographer (d. 1758)
- December 6 – Anthony Mooyart, acting Governor of Ceylon during the Dutch period in Ceylon (d. 1767)
- December 9 – Mark Hiddesley, Anglican churchman (d. 1773)
- December 20 – Paul Fourdrinier, English engraver (d. 1758)
- December 21 – Philip Wharton, 1st Duke of Wharton, powerful Jacobite politician (d. 1731)
- December 24 – William Warburton, English critic and Bishop of Gloucester (d. 1779)
- December 25 – Jacobus Houbraken, Dutch engraver and the son of the artist and biographer Arnold Houbraken (d. 1780)
- December 26 – Filippo della Valle, Italian late-Baroque or early Neoclassic sculptor (d. 1768)
- December 27 – Vlaho Kabužić, Ragusan nobleman and diplomat (d. 1750)
- date unknown
  - Bernard Forest de Bélidor, French engineer (d. 1761)
  - William Moraley, English-American indentured servant and autobiographer, a primary source for life in the Province of Pennsylvania (d. 1762)
  - Baal Shem Tov, Polish rabbi and founder of the Hasidic movement of Judaism.

== Deaths ==
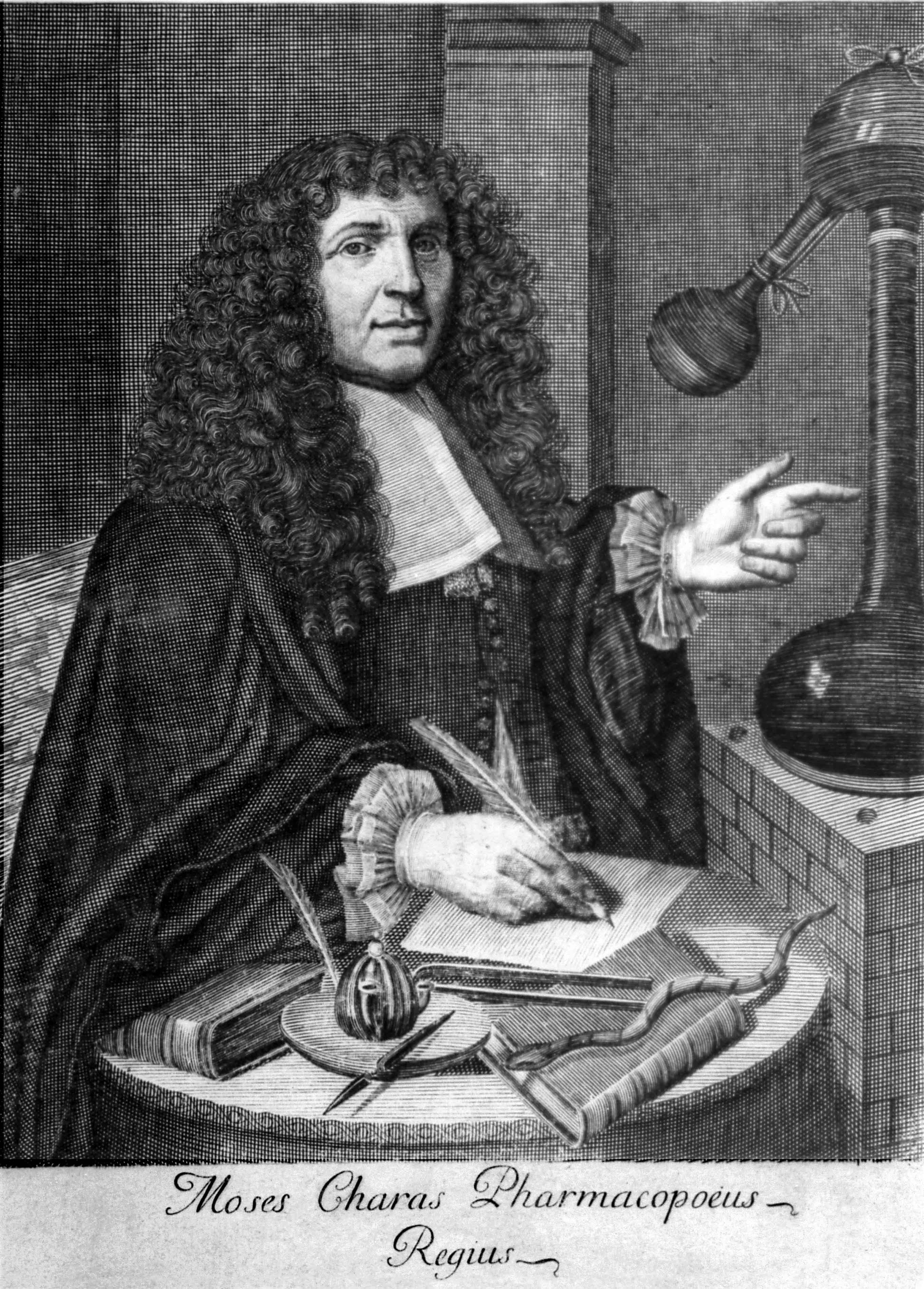
Moyse Charas died 17 January

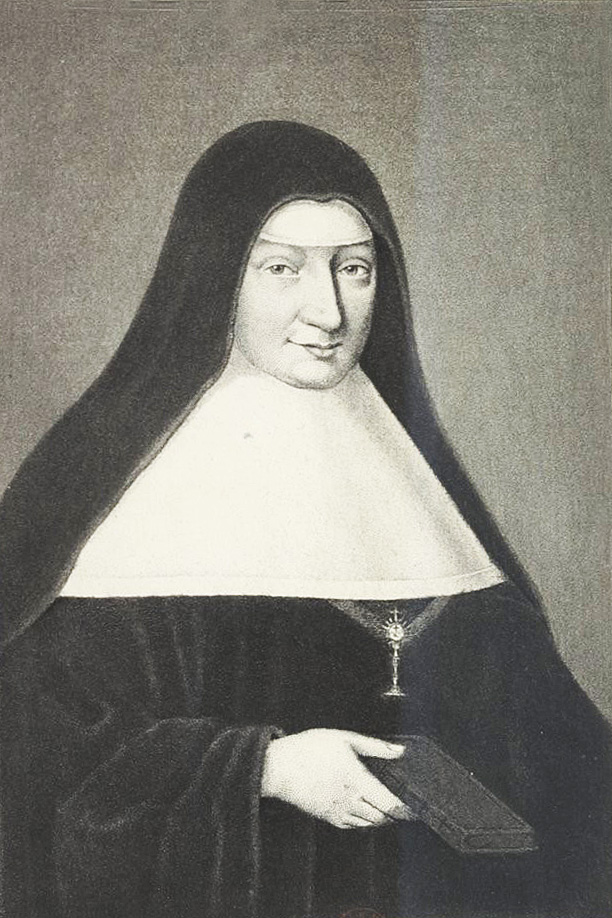
Mechtilde of the Blessed Sacrament died 6 April

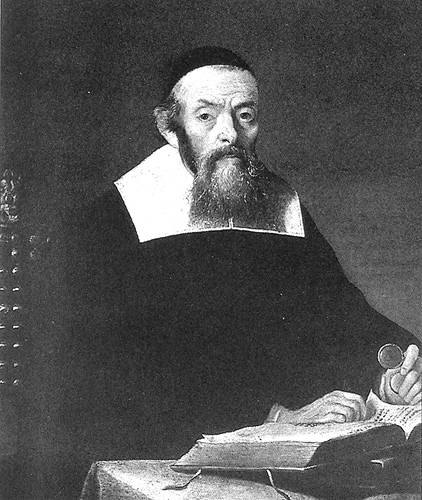
Jacob ben Aaron Sasportas died 15 April

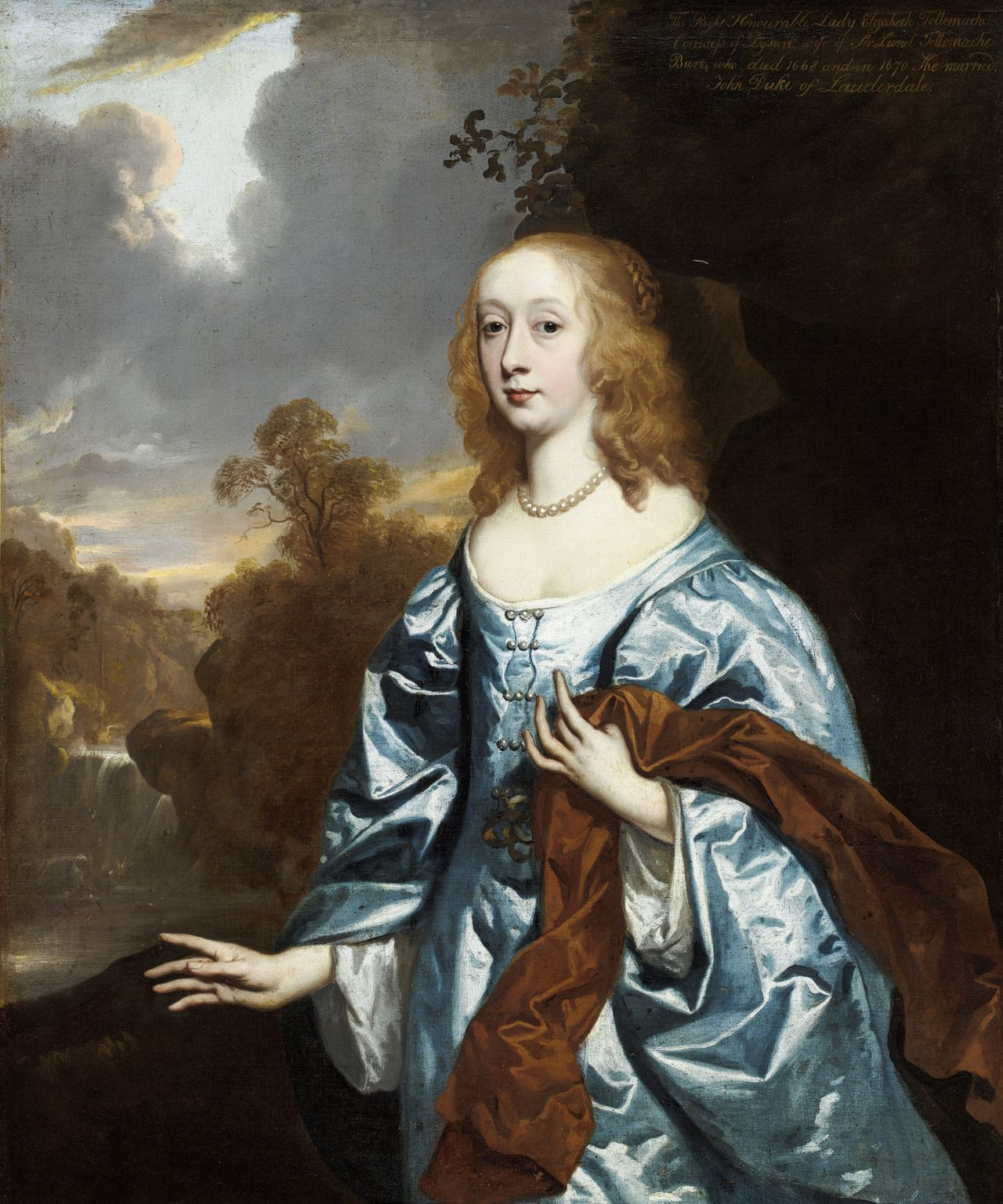
Elizabeth Maitland, Duchess of Lauderdale died 5 June

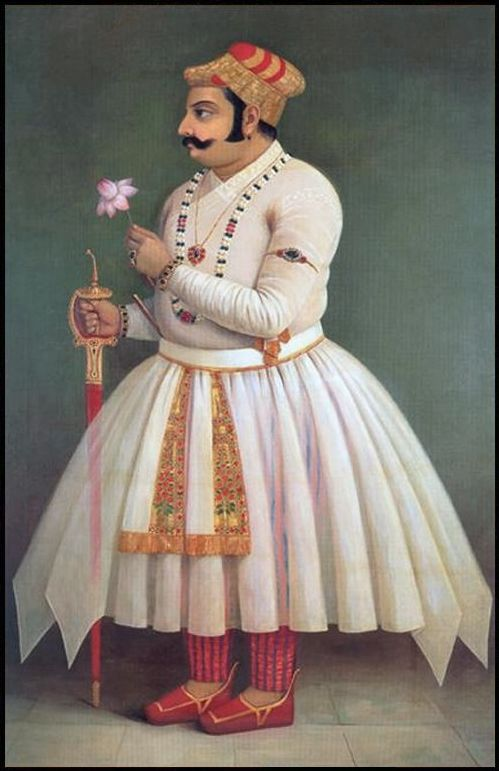
Jai Singh of Mewar died 23 September

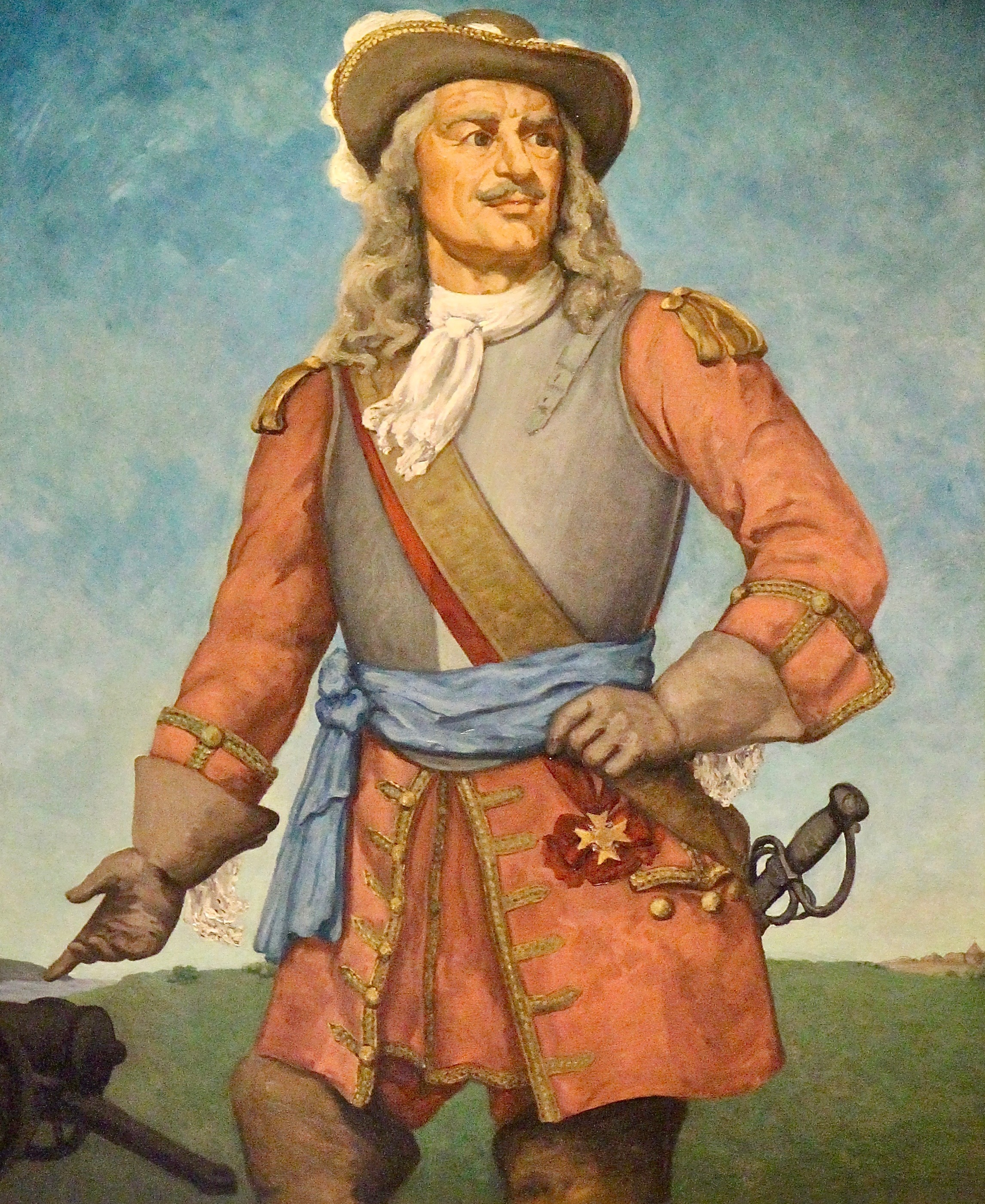
Louis de Buade de Frontenac died 28 November

=== January–March ===
- January 10 – Louis-Sébastien Le Nain de Tillemont, French ecclesiastical historian (b. 1637)
- January 15
  - Girolamo Borghese, Roman Catholic prelate, Bishop of Pienza (1668–1698) (b. 1616)
  - Richard Boyle, 1st Earl of Burlington, Anglo-Irish nobleman, Lord High Treasurer of Ireland, Cavalier (b. 1612)
- January 17 – Moyse Charas, apothecary in France during the reign of Louis XIV (b. 1619)
- January 20 – Giannicolò Conti, Roman Catholic cardinal (b. 1617)
- January 22 – Frederick Casimir Kettler, Duke of Courland and Semigallia (b. 1650)
- January 23 – Ernest Augustus, Elector of Brunswick-Lüneburg (b. 1629)
- February 9 – Francis Bernard, English apothecary (b. 1628)
- February 16 – Sir James Rushout, 1st Baronet, English politician (b. 1644)
- February 21 – Rowland Thomas, English colonist of Springfield, Massachusetts, selectman, stonemason, surveyor, and proprietor (b. 1621)
- March 2 – Jacques Quétif, French Dominican and noted bibliographer (b. 1618)
- March 6 – Philip Sidney, 3rd Earl of Leicester, English politician (b. 1619)
- March 14 – Claes Rålamb, Swedish statesman (b. 1622)
- March 16 – Leonora Christina Ulfeldt, Danish countess (b. 1621)

=== April–June ===
- April 6 – Mechtilde of the Blessed Sacrament, French nun (b. 1614)
- April 9 – Charles d'Albert d'Ailly, French diplomat (b. 1625)
- April 11 – Charles Morton, Cornish nonconformist minister (b. 1627)
- April 15 – Jacob ben Aaron Sasportas, Rabbi, Kabbalist, anti-Shabbethaian (b. 1610)
- April 29 – Charles Cornwallis, 3rd Baron Cornwallis, First Lord of the British Admiralty (b. 1655)
- May 4 – Minye Kyawhtin, king of Toungoo dynasty of Burma (Myanmar) (b. 1651)
- May 15 – Marie Champmeslé, French actress (b. 1642)
- May 19 – Vere Fane, 5th Earl of Westmorland (b. 1678)
- May 24 – William Blundell of Crosby, English Royalist landowner and topographer (b. 1620)
- June 5
  - Elizabeth Maitland, Duchess of Lauderdale, influential British noblewoman (b. 1626)
  - Domenico Minio, Roman Catholic prelate, Bishop of Caorle (1684–1698) (b. 1628)
- June 10 – Gerrit Berckheyde, Dutch Golden Age painter (b. 1638)
- June 11 – Balthasar Bekker, Dutch minister and author of philosophical and theological works (b. 1634)
- June 29 – Paluzzo Paluzzi Altieri degli Albertoni, Italian Catholic Cardinal and Cardinal-Nephew to Pope Clement X (b. 1623)
- June 30 – Charles Cheyne, 1st Viscount Newhaven, English Member of Parliament (b. 1625)

=== July–September ===
- July 11 – Antonio Molinari, Roman Catholic prelate, Bishop of Lettere-Gragnano (1676–1698) (b. 1626)
- July 13 – Charles Somerset, Marquess of Worcester, English nobleman and politician (b. 1660)
- July 18 – Johann Heinrich Heidegger, Swiss theologian (b. 1633)
- July 29 – Bartolomeo Gradenigo, Roman Catholic prelate, Bishop of Brescia (1682–1698) (b. 1636)
- August 14 – Francisco de Aguiar y Seijas, Spanish cleric and bishop (b. 1632)
- August 25 – Fleetwood Sheppard, English poet (b. 1634)
- August 31 – Miguel Jerónimo de Molina, Spanish prelate and bishop (b. 1638)
- September 23 – Jai Singh of Mewar, Maharana of Mewar from 1680 to 1698 (b. 1653)

=== October–December ===
- October 11 – William Molyneux, Irish philosopher and writer (b. 1656)
- October 23 – David Klöcker Ehrenstrahl, German artist (b. 1628)
- October 24 – Daniel de Rémy de Courcelle, Canadian politician (b. 1626)
- November 4 – Rasmus Bartholin, Danish physician and grammarian (b. 1625)
- November 10 – John George II, Duke of Saxe-Eisenach (b. 1665)
- November 13 – Johann, Count of Leiningen-Dagsburg-Falkenburg, German nobleman (b. 1662)
- November 20 – Giovanni Battista De Pace, Roman Catholic prelate, Bishop of Capaccio (1684–1698) (b. 1627)
- November 23 – César-Pierre Richelet, French grammarian and lexicographer (b. 1626)
- November 28 – Louis de Buade de Frontenac, Governor of New France (b. 1622)
- December 1 – Ferdinand Joseph, Prince of Dietrichstein, German prince (b. 1636)
- December 7 – Andrea Guarneri, Italian luthier (b. 1626)
- December 9 – José González Blázquez, Roman Catholic prelate, Bishop of Plasencia (1695–1698) (b. 1630)
- December 16 – Simone Pignoni, Italian painter (b. 1611)
- December 26 – Wolfgang Julius, Count of Hohenlohe-Neuenstein, German field marshal and the last count of Hohenlohe-Neuenstein (b. 1622)
- date unknown
  - Nicholas Barbon, English economist (b. c. 1640)
  - Franciscus Mercurius van Helmont, Flemish alchemist (b. 1614)
- in fiction – Mircalla Karnstein, Countess of Karnstein (b. 1680)
