= Jacob Kohler =

Jacob Kohler may refer to:

- Jacob Kohler (Ontario politician) (1860–?), Ontario farmer and political figure
- Jacob A. Kohler (1835–1916), Republican politician from the state of Ohio
- Jacob Johann Köhler (1698–1757), Estonian printer
