= 1762 =

1762 in various calendars
- Gregorian calendar: 1762; MDCCLXII
- Ab urbe condita: 2515
- Armenian calendar: 1211; ԹՎ ՌՄԺԱ
- Assyrian calendar: 6512
- Balinese saka calendar: 1683–1684
- Bengali calendar: 1168–1169
- Berber calendar: 2712
- British Regnal year: 2 Geo. 3 – 3 Geo. 3
- Buddhist calendar: 2306
- Burmese calendar: 1124
- Byzantine calendar: 7270–7271
- Chinese calendar: 辛巳年 (Metal Snake); 4459 or 4252 — to — 壬午年 (Water Horse); 4460 or 4253
- Coptic calendar: 1478–1479
- Discordian calendar: 2928
- Ethiopian calendar: 1754–1755
- Hebrew calendar: 5522–5523
- Hindu calendars
- Vikram Samvat: 1818–1819
- Shaka Samvat: 1683–1684
- Kali Yuga: 4862–4863
- Holocene calendar: 11762
- Igbo calendar: 762–763
- Iranian calendar: 1140–1141
- Islamic calendar: 1175–1176
- Japanese calendar: Hōreki 12 (宝暦１２年)
- Javanese calendar: 1687–1688
- Julian calendar: Gregorian minus 11 days
- Korean calendar: 4095
- Minguo calendar: 150 before ROC 民前150年
- Nanakshahi calendar: 294
- Thai solar calendar: 2304–2305
- Tibetan calendar: ལྕགས་མོ་སྦྲུལ་ལོ་ (female Iron-Snake); 1888 or 1507 or 735 — to — ཆུ་ཕོ་རྟ་ལོ་ (male Water-Horse); 1889 or 1508 or 736

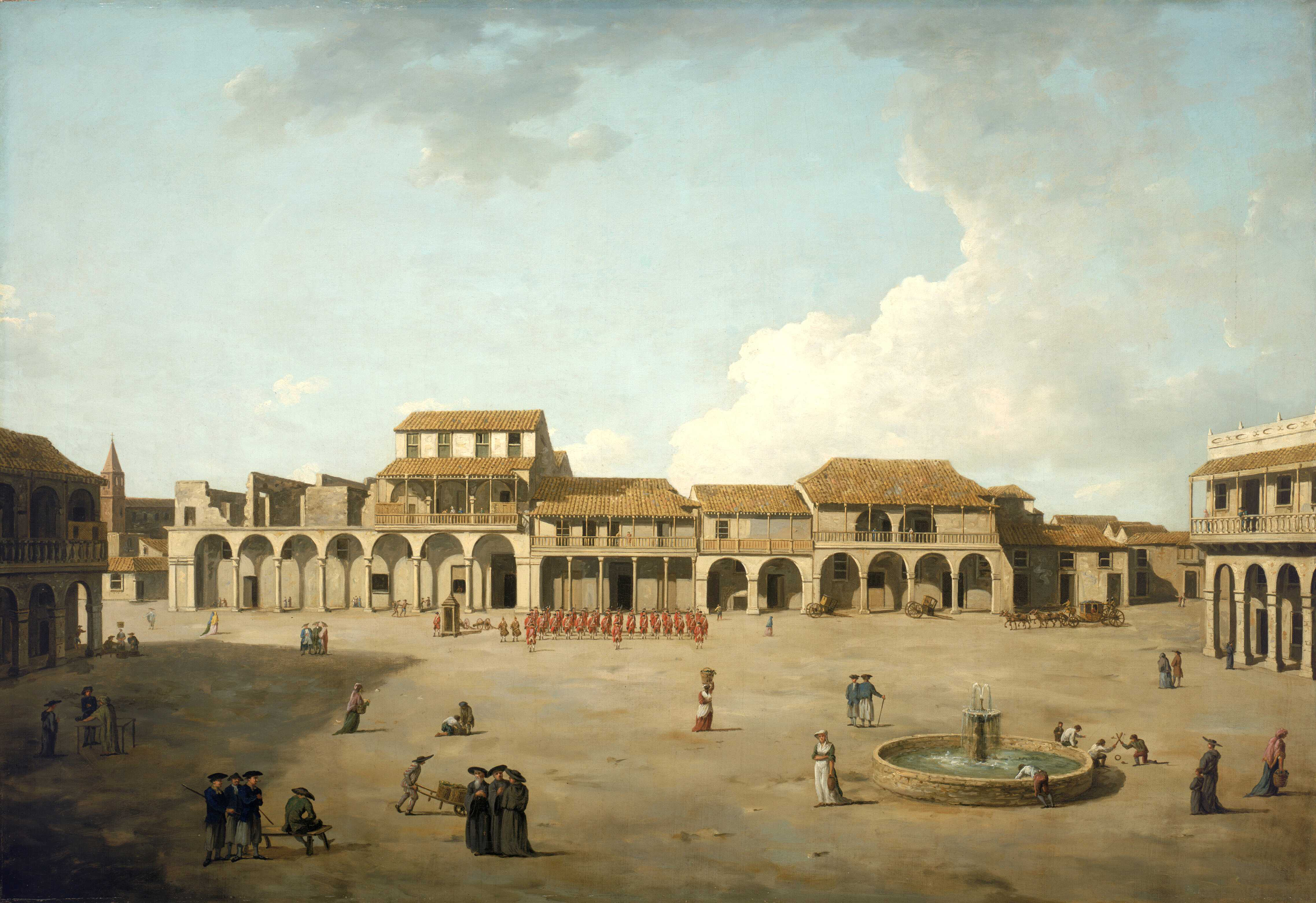
August 13: British troops storm Havana on the island of Cuba and occupy the Spanish city.(shown:The Piazza at Havana by Dominic Serres.)

1762 (MDCCLXII) was a common year starting on Friday of the Gregorian calendar and a common year starting on Tuesday of the Julian calendar, the 1762nd year of the Common Era (CE) and Anno Domini (AD) designations, the 762nd year of the 2nd millennium, the 62nd year of the 18th century, and the 3rd year of the 1760s decade. As of the start of 1762, the Gregorian calendar was 11 days ahead of the Julian calendar, which remained in localized use until 1923.

== Events ==
=== January–March ===
- January 4 – Seven Years' War: Britain declares war against Spain and Naples, following their recent alliance with France.
- January 5 – Empress Elisabeth of Russia dies, and is succeeded by her nephew Peter III. Peter, an admirer of Frederick the Great, immediately opens peace negotiations with the Prussians.
- January 16 – British forces under Robert Monckton land on the French island of Martinique in the Caribbean.
- February 5 – The Great Holocaust of the Sikhs is carried out by the forces of Ahmed Shah Abdali in Punjab. In all, around 30,000 men, women and children perish in this campaign of slaughter.
- February 15 – Invasion of Martinique (1762): French forces on Martinique surrender to the British. The island is subsequently returned to France, as part of the Peace of Paris.
- March 5 – A Royal Navy fleet with 16,000 men departs Britain from Spithead and sets sail toward Cuba in order to seize strategic Spanish Empire possessions in the Americas.
- March 10 – Jean Calas, a 68 year old French merchant convicted unjustly of murdering his son because of religious differences, is brutally executed on orders of the Parlement of Toulouse. After his legs and hips are broken and crushed, Calas is tortured on the breaking wheel (la roue), to remain "in pain and repentance for his crimes and misdeeds, for as long as it shall please God to keep him alive."
- March 17 – The first Saint Patrick's Day Parade in New York City takes place in lower Manhattan, inaugurating an annual tradition; the Ancient Order of the Hibernians organization later becomes the sponsor of the event, which attracts as many a 300,000 marchers in some years.
- March 20 – Innovative publisher Samuel Farley launches the weekly newspaper The American Chronicle, the seventh in New York City.

=== April–June ===
- April 2 – A powerful earthquake along the border between modern-day Bangladesh and Myanmar causes a tsunami in the Bay of Bengal that kills at least 200 people.
- April 5 – France issues a new ordinance requiring all black and mixed-race Frenchmen to register their identity information with the offices of the Admiralty Court, upon the advice of Guillaume Poncet de la Grave, adviser to King Louis XV. The new rule, which requires both free and enslaved blacks and mulattoes to list data including their age, surname, purpose for which they are residing in France, whether they have been baptized as Christians, where they emigrated from in Africa and the name of the ship upon which they arrived. Previously, the Declaration of 1738 required slave-owners to register their slaves, but placed no requirement on free people.
- May 5 (April 24 O.S.) – The Treaty of Saint Petersburg ends the war between Russia and Prussia, and returns all of Russia's territorial conquests to the Prussians.
- May 22 – The Treaty of Hamburg takes Sweden out of the war against Prussia.
- May 26 – Dissatisfied with the progress of the French and Indian War, King George III dismisses his Prime Minister, the Duke of Newcastle, and replaces him with his former tutor, Tory politician John Stuart, 3rd Earl of Bute. The Bute ministry lasts less than a year before Stuart's resignation in 1763.
- May 31 – Marco Foscarini becomes the new Doge of the Republic of Venice after the death of Francesco Loredan, who had administered the Republic for 10 years.
- June 8 – Cherokee Indian war chief Ostenaco and his two aides, Standing Turkey (Cunneshote) and Pouting Pigeon, are received by King George III. They had arrived three days earlier at Plymouth on the British frigate Epreuvre as guests of the Timberlake Expedition of Henry Timberlake, to discuss terms of peace with the British government.
- June 24 – Battle of Wilhelmsthal: The Anglo-Hanoverian army of Ferdinand of Brunswick defeats the French forces in Westphalia. The British commander Lord Granby distinguishes himself.

=== July–September ===
- July 9 – Catherine II becomes empress of Russia after planning the overthrow of her husband, the Tsar Peter III. The incipient Russo-Prussian alliance falls apart, but Russia does not rejoin the war. Peter is strangled eight days later.
- July 21 – Battle of Burkersdorf: In his last major battle, Frederick defeats Marshal Daun in Silesia.
- August 13 – Seven Years' War: The Battle of Havana concludes after more than two months, with the surrender of Havana by Spain to Great Britain.
- August 21 – King Prithvi Narayan Shah of Gorkha conquers Makwanpur.
- September 15
  - French and Indian War: Battle of Signal Hill – British troops defeat the French in the last battle of the North American theatre of the Seven Years' War, fought in the Newfoundland Colony.
  - Empress Go-Sakuramachi succeeds to the throne of Japan upon the death of her brother, the Emperor Momozono. She reigns for eight years before abdicating on January 9, 1771. She was the last empress regnant of Japan up to this day.
- September 24–October 6 – Battle of Manila: Troops of the British East India Company take Manila from the Spanish, leading to the British occupation of Manila and its being made an open port.

=== October–December ===
- October 5 – Orfeo ed Euridice by Cristoph Willibald Gluck was given its first performance.
- October 7 – Siege of Schweidnitz in Silesia. Prussia takes the strategic fortress from Austria.
- October 29 – Battle of Freiberg: Prince Henry of Prussia, Frederick's brother, defeats the Austrian army of Marshal Serbelloni.
- November 13 – In the Treaty of Fontainebleau, Louis XV secretly cedes Louisiana (New France) to Charles III of Spain to compensate his ally for territorial losses to Britain.
- December 4 – Less than six months after becoming Russia's Empress, Catherine the Great announces that almost all foreigners are welcome to travel to and settle in Russia, and waives previous requirements that new residents must be members of the Russian Orthodox Church; however, the manifesto adds the phrase kromye Zhydov - "except the Jews".
- December 22 – Catherine follows the waiver of religious requirement for Russian immigration with a 190-word invitation, translated into various European languages, that invites Europeans to build settlements along arable, but undeveloped, land in southern Russia along the Volga River; when the invitation attracts little notice, she follows on July 22 with a longer manifesto promising free travel expenses and a written guarantee of rights.

=== Date unknown ===
- Louis XV orders the construction of the Petit Trianon, in the park of the Palace of Versailles, for his mistress Madame de Pompadour.
- Neolin, a Lenape prophet, begins to preach in America.
- The North Carolina General Assembly incorporates Kingston, named for King George III, as the county seat of Dobbs County, North Carolina. The name is later shortened to Kinston in 1784.
- The town of Charlottesville, Virginia is founded.
- The Plymouth Synagogue is built in Plymouth, England, the oldest built by Ashkenazi Jews in the English-speaking world.
- Philosopher Jean-Jacques Rousseau's The Social Contract (Du Contrat social, ou Principes du droit politique) and Emile, or On Education (Émile, ou De l’éducation) are published in Amsterdam and The Hague respectively. In Rousseau's native Republic of Geneva they are publicly burned and prohibited in Paris.
- James "Athenian" Stuart and Nicholas Revett's architectural treatise Antiquities of Athens is published.
- Istoriya Slavyanobolgarskaya is finished by Paisius of Hilendar.
- Approximate date of the foundation of Zubarah on the northwestern shore of the Qatari Peninsula, by Shaikh Mohamed bin Khalifa Al Khalifa, who assumes the chieftainship of the city state and gains authority over the Arab tribes in the area.

== Births ==
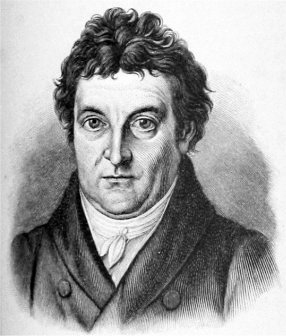
Johann Gottlieb Fichte

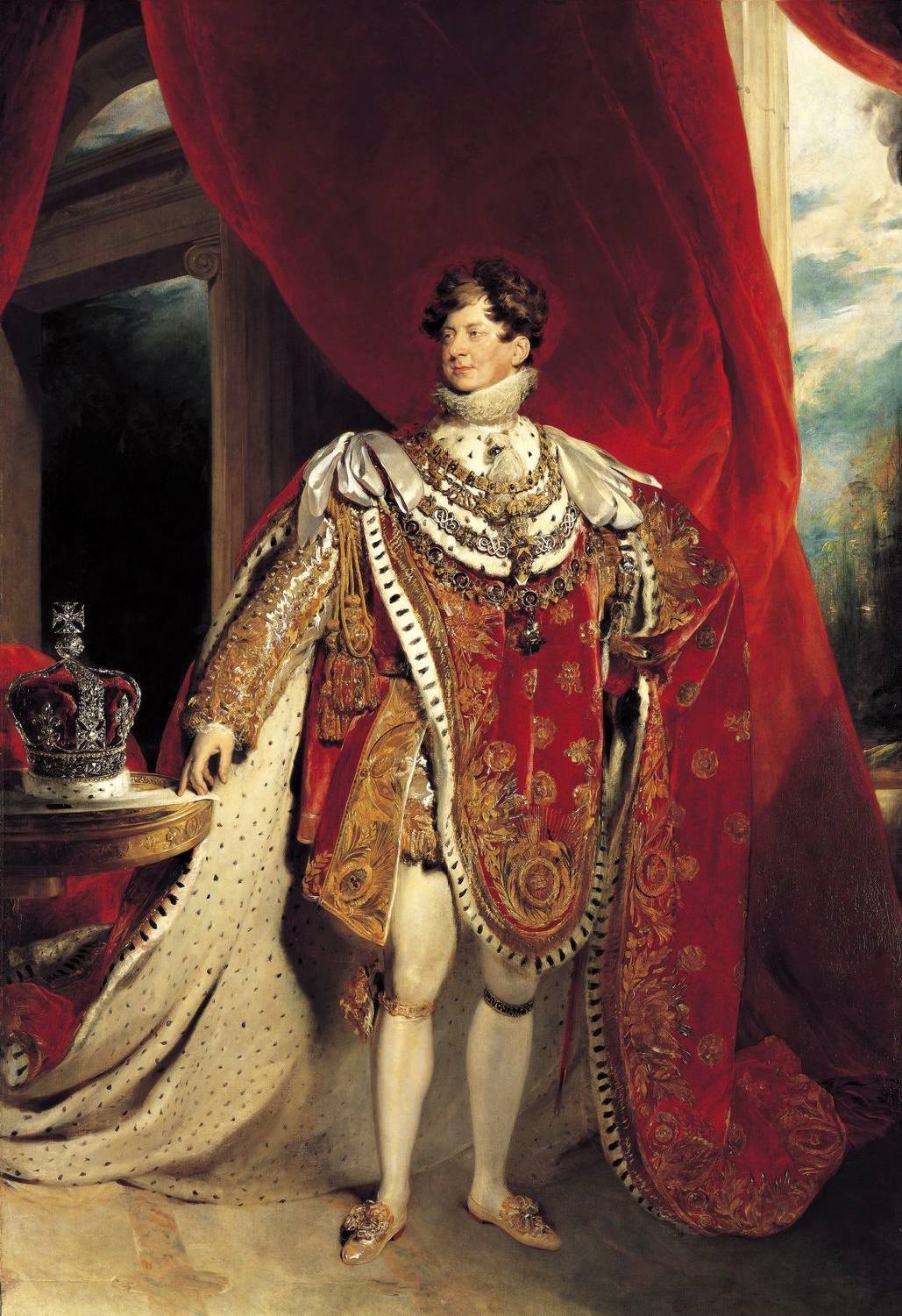
George IV

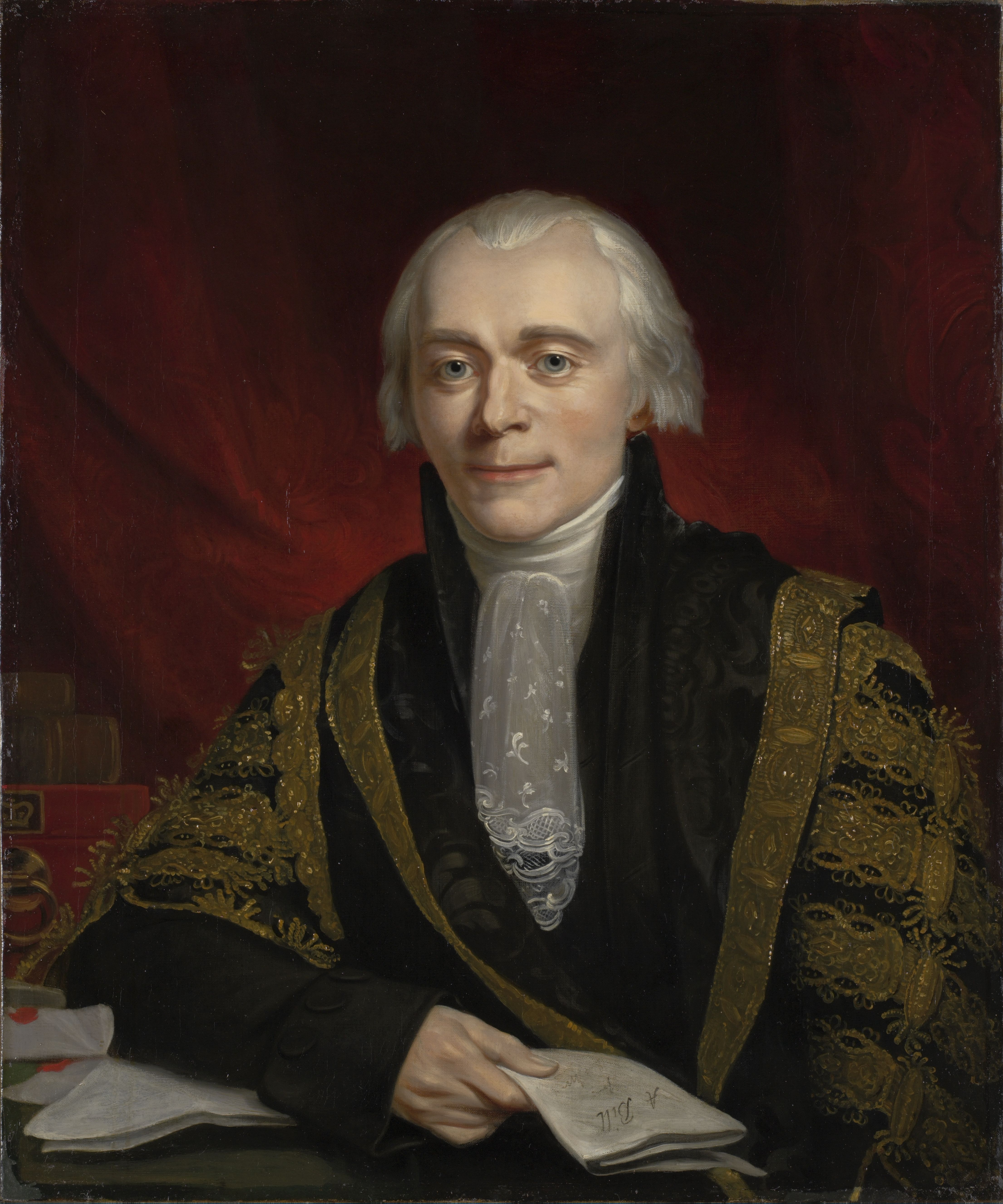
Spencer Perceval, British Prime Minister assassinated in 1812.

- January 31 – Molly Morgan, British convict and settler in Australia (d. 1835)
- February 4 – Johan Herman Schützercrantz, Swedish admiral
- February 17 – John Cooke, English captain (d. 1805)
- March 11 – Robert Gray, British bishop (d. 1834)
- March 22 – William Robert Broughton, British explorer (d. 1821)
- April 29 – Jean-Baptiste Jourdan, French marshal (d. 1833)
- May 6 – William Hargood, British admiral (d. 1839)
- May 19 – Johann Gottlieb Fichte, German philosopher (d. 1814)
- May 20 – Eyre Coote, Irish soldier and politician (d. 1823)
- May 22 – Henry Bathurst, 3rd Earl Bathurst, British politician (d. 1834)
- June 5 – Bushrod Washington, American politician and Associate Justice of the Supreme Court of the United States (d. 1829)
- July 17 – Alexander Macdonell, Scottish bishop in Canada (d. 1840)
- August 12
  - King George IV of the United Kingdom (d. 1830)
  - Christoph Wilhelm Hufeland, German physician (d. 1836)
- August 13 – Théroigne de Méricourt, French revolutionary (d. 1817)
- September 11 – Joanna Baillie, Scottish writer (d. 1851)
- October 1 – Anton Bernolák, Slovak linguist (d. 1813)
- October 9 – Charles de Suremain, French military and diplomat (d. 1835)
- October 12 – Jan Willem Janssens, Governor-General of the Dutch East Indies (d. 1838)
- October 16 – Paul Hamilton, American politician (d. 1816)
- October 21
  - George Colman the Younger, British playwright (d. 1836)
  - Herman Willem Daendels, governor-general of the Dutch East Indies (d. 1818)
- October 23 – Samuel Morey, American inventor (d. 1843)
- October 30 – André Chénier, French writer (d. 1794)
- November 1 – Spencer Perceval, Prime Minister of the United Kingdom (d. 1812)
- November 27 – Sir Samuel Hood, 1st Baronet, British admiral (d. 1814)
- November – Manuel Torres, first Colombian ambassador to the United States (d. 1822)
- December 22 – Dudley Ryder, 1st Earl of Harrowby, British politician (d. 1847)
- December 25 – Michael Kelly, Irish composer and singer (d. 1826)

=== Date unknown ===
- Andrew Hay, British general (d. 1814)
- Birgithe Kühle, Norwegian journalist (d. 1832)
- Natalia Shelikhova, Russian business person (d. 1810)

== Deaths ==
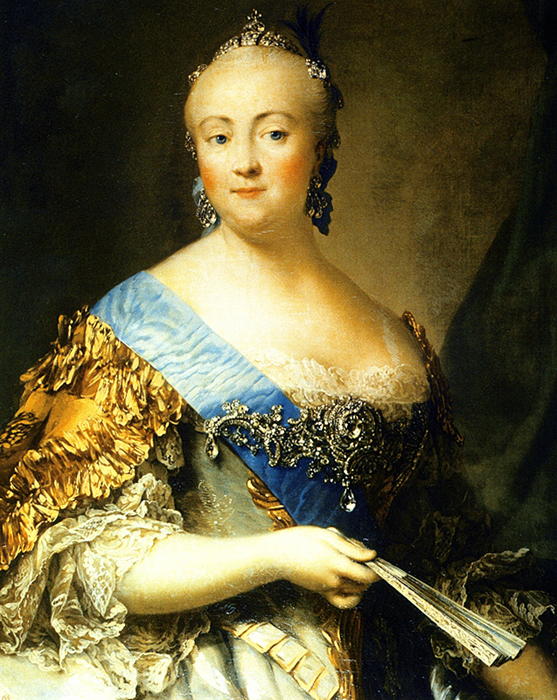
Elizabeth of Russia

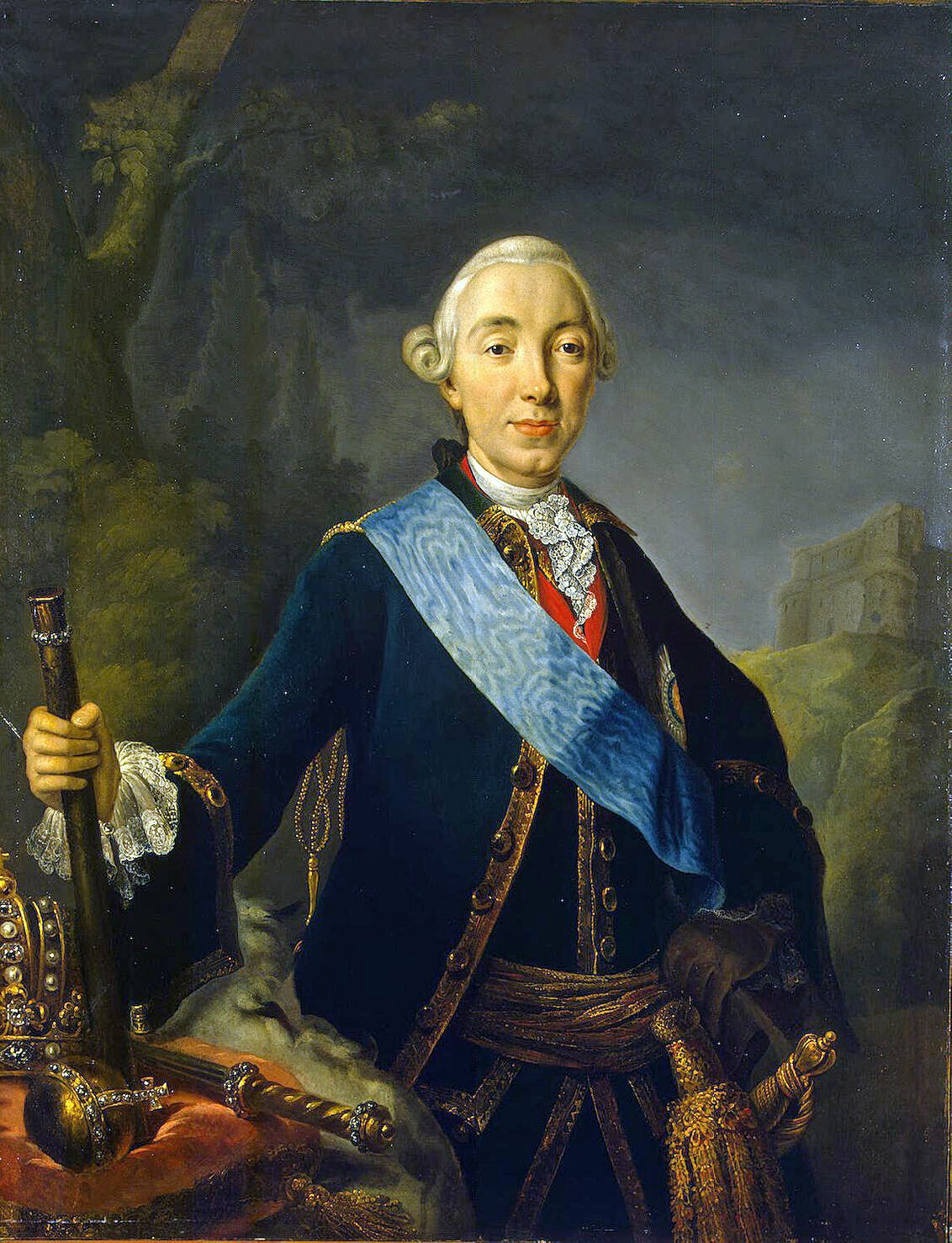
Peter III of Russia, nephew of Elizabeth.

- January 5 – Empress Elizabeth of Russia (b. 1709)
- January 7 – Manuel de Montiano, Spanish colonial administrator (b. 1685)
- January 11 – Louis-François Roubiliac, French sculptor (b. 1695)
- February 11 – Johann Tobias Krebs, German composer (b. 1690)
- February 12 – Laurent Belissen, French composer (b. 1693)
- February 20 – Tobias Mayer, German astronomer (b. 1723)
- March 4 – Johannes Zick, German fresco painter (b. 1702)
- March 18 – Paul II Anton, Prince Esterházy of Hungary (b. 1711)
- March 21 – Nicolas-Louis de Lacaille, French astronomer (b. 1713)
- April 1 – Germain Louis Chauvelin, French politician (b. 1685)
- May 15 – Michał Kazimierz "Rybeńko" Radziwiłł, Polish-Lithuanian noble (b. 1702)
- May 19 – Francesco Loredan, doge of Venice (b. 1685)
- May 21 – Alexander Joseph Sulkowski, Polish and Saxon general (b. 1695)
- May 26 – Alexander Gottlieb Baumgarten, German philosopher (b. 1714)
- June 13 – Dorothea Erxleben, German physician (b. 1715)
- June 17 – Prosper Jolyot de Crébillon, French writer (b. 1674)
- June 19 – Johann Ernst Eberlin, German composer (b. 1702)
- June 26 – Luise Gottsched, German poet, playwright, essayist and translator (b. 1713)
- July 12 – Prince Sado, son of Yeongjo of Joseon (b. 1735)
- July 13 – James Bradley, English Astronomer Royal (b. 1693)
- July 17 – Emperor Peter III of Russia (b. 1728)
- July 28 – George Dodington, 1st Baron Melcombe, English politician (b. 1691)
- July 31 – Luis Vicente de Velasco e Isla, Royal Spanish Navy sailor, commander (b. 1711)
- August 20 – Shah Waliullah, Islamic reformer (b. 1703)
- August 21 – Lady Mary Wortley Montagu, English writer (b. 1689)
- August 31 – Emperor Momozono of Japan (b. 1741)
- August 26 – John Fane, 7th Earl of Westmorland, British politician (b. 1685)
- September 17 – Francesco Geminiani, Italian composer (b. 1687)
- October 5 – John Olmius, 1st Baron Waltham of Ireland (b. 1711)
- October 6 – Francesco Manfredini, Italian composer (b. 1684)
- November 16 – John Boyle, 5th Earl of Cork, Irish writer (b. 1707)
- November 19 – Lord Robert Manners-Sutton, British politician (b. 1722)
- date unknown – William Moraley, English-American indentured servant and autobiographer (b. 1698)
