= Helvíkovice =

- Municipality
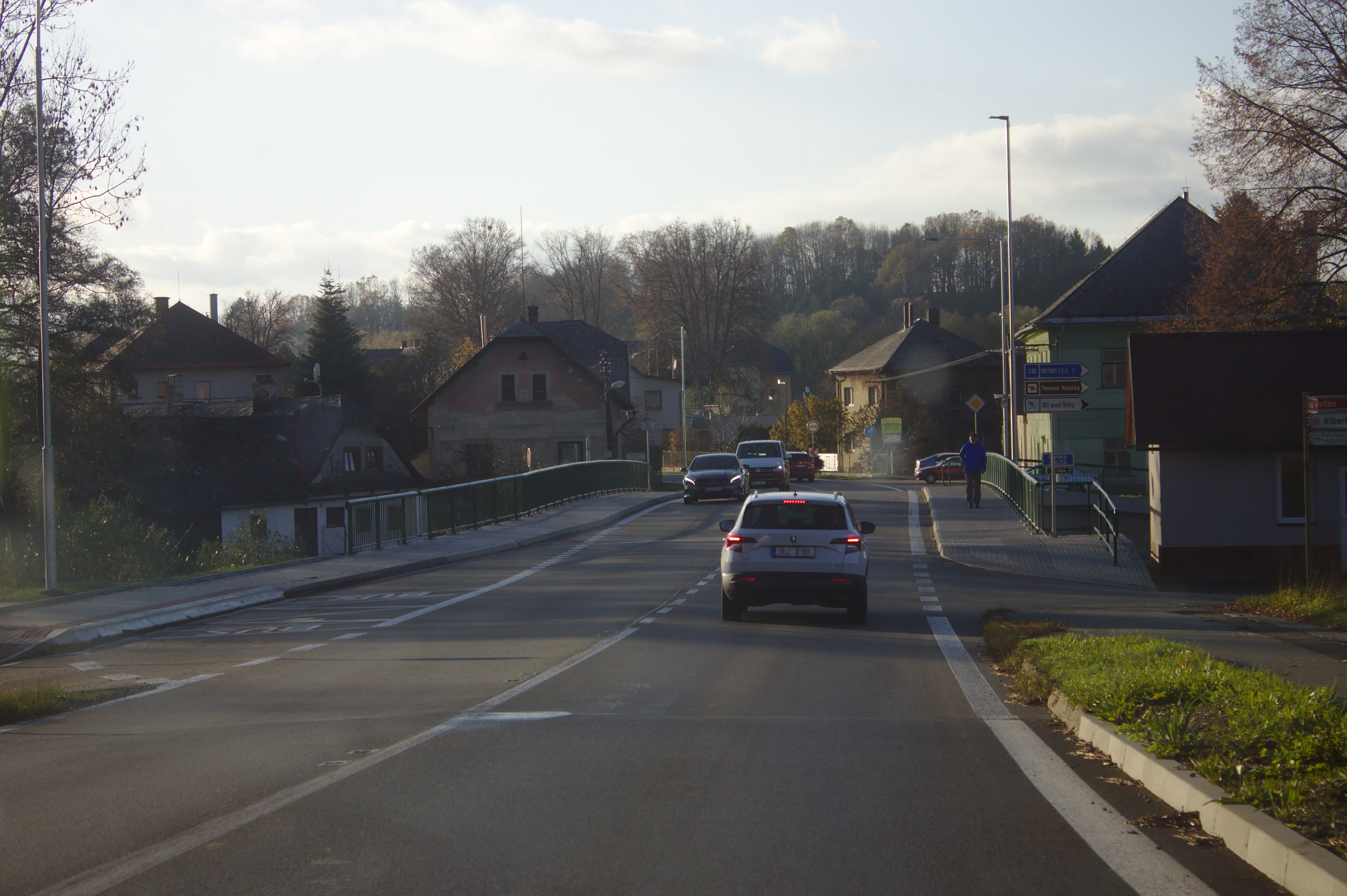
- Main road

- Flag Coat of arms

- Location in the Czech Republic
- Coordinates: 50°5′32″N 16°25′52″E
- Country: Czech Republic
- Region: Pardubice
- District: Ústí nad Orlicí
- First mentioned: 1365

Area
  - Total: 10.74 km^{2} (4.15 sq mi)
- Elevation: 398 m (1,306 ft)

Population (2026-01-01)
  - Total: 574
  - Density: 53.4/km^{2} (138/sq mi)
- Time zone: UTC+1 (CET)
  - Summer (DST): UTC+2 (CEST)
- Postal code: 564 01
- Website: www.helvikovice.cz

Helvíkovice (German: Helkowitz) is a municipality and village in Ústí nad Orlicí District in the Pardubice Region of the Czech Republic. It has about 600 inhabitants.

== Administrative division ==
Helvíkovice consists of two municipal parts (in brackets population according to the 2021 census):

- Helvíkovice (488)
- Houkov (25)

== Etymology ==
The name is derived from the personal name Helvík, meaning "the village of Helvík's people".

== Geography ==
Helvíkovice is located about 13 kilometres (8 mi) north of Ústí nad Orlicí and 46 km (29 mi) east of Pardubice. It lies in the Orlické Foothills. The highest point is the near the top of the hill Hůrka at 515 m (1,690 ft) above sea level. The Divoká Orlice River flows through the municipality.

== History ==
The first written mention of Helvíkovice is from 1365. The village was founded in the second half of the 14th century.

== Demographics ==
Historical population

Year	Pop.	±%
1869	769	—
1880	648	−15.7%
1890	682	+5.2%
1900	663	−2.8%
1910	646	−2.6%

Year	Pop.	±%
1921	627	−2.9%
1930	611	−2.6%
1950	475	−22.3%
1961	470	−1.1%
1970	452	−3.8%

Year	Pop.	±%
1980	385	−14.8%
1991	397	+3.1%
2001	407	+2.5%
2011	443	+8.8%
2021	513	+15.8%

Source: Censuses

== Transport ==
The I/11 road (the section from Hradec Králové to Šumperk) runs through the municipality.

== Sights ==
There are no protected cultural monuments in the municipality. The main landmark of Helvíkovice is the Chapel of Saint Anthony of Padua, dating from 1894.

== Notable people ==
- Prokop Diviš (1698–1765), inventor and Catholic priest
