= Prokop Diviš =

Czech theologian and scientist

Dom Prokop Diviš O.Praem.
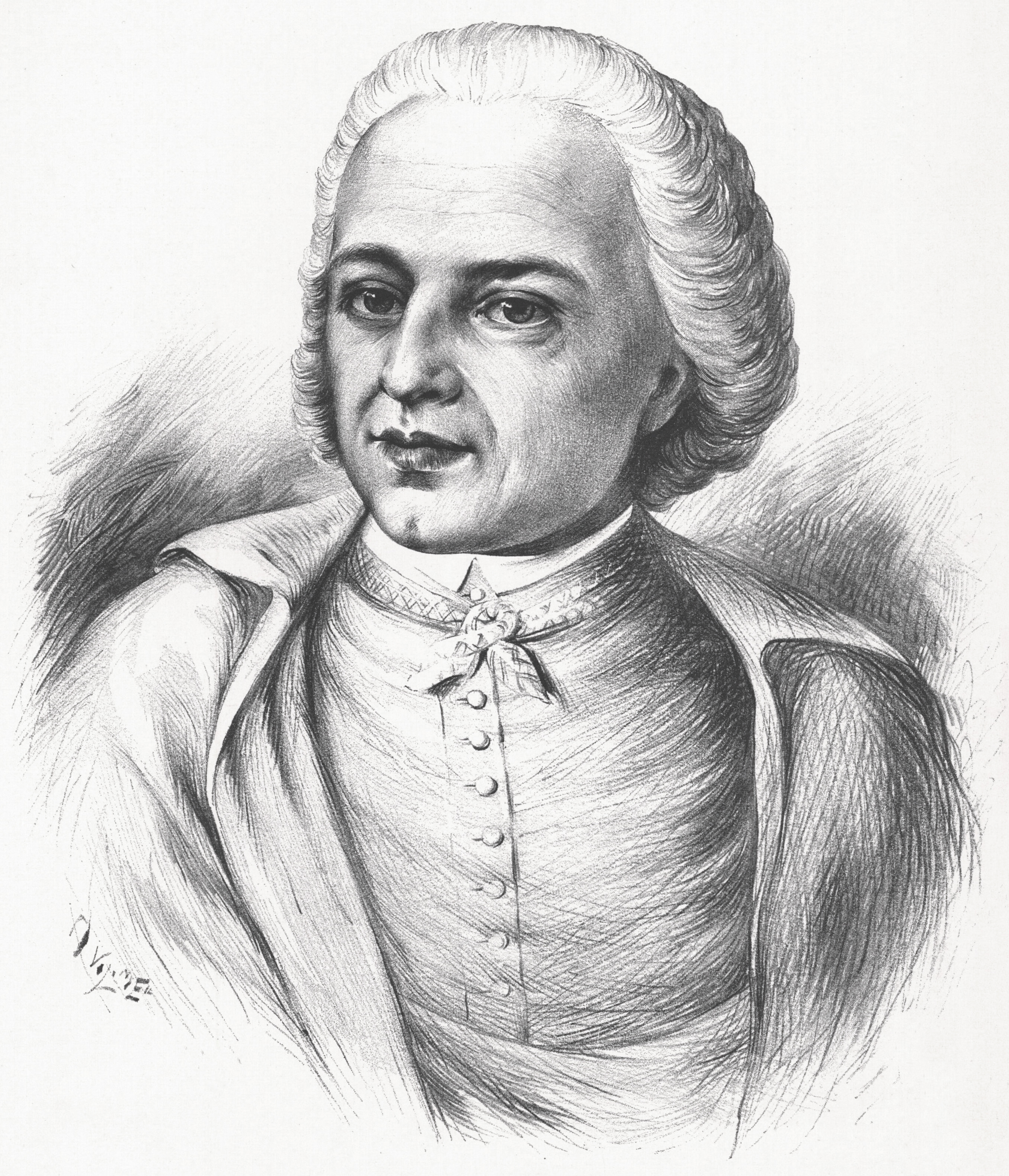
- Portrait by Jan Vilímek
- Born: 26 March 1698; Helvíkovice, Kingdom of Bohemia, Habsburg Empire
- Died: 21 December 1765 (aged 67); Přímětice, Kingdom of Bohemia, Habsburg Empire
- Education: University of Salzburg
- Occupations: Praemonstratensian canon regular and scientist

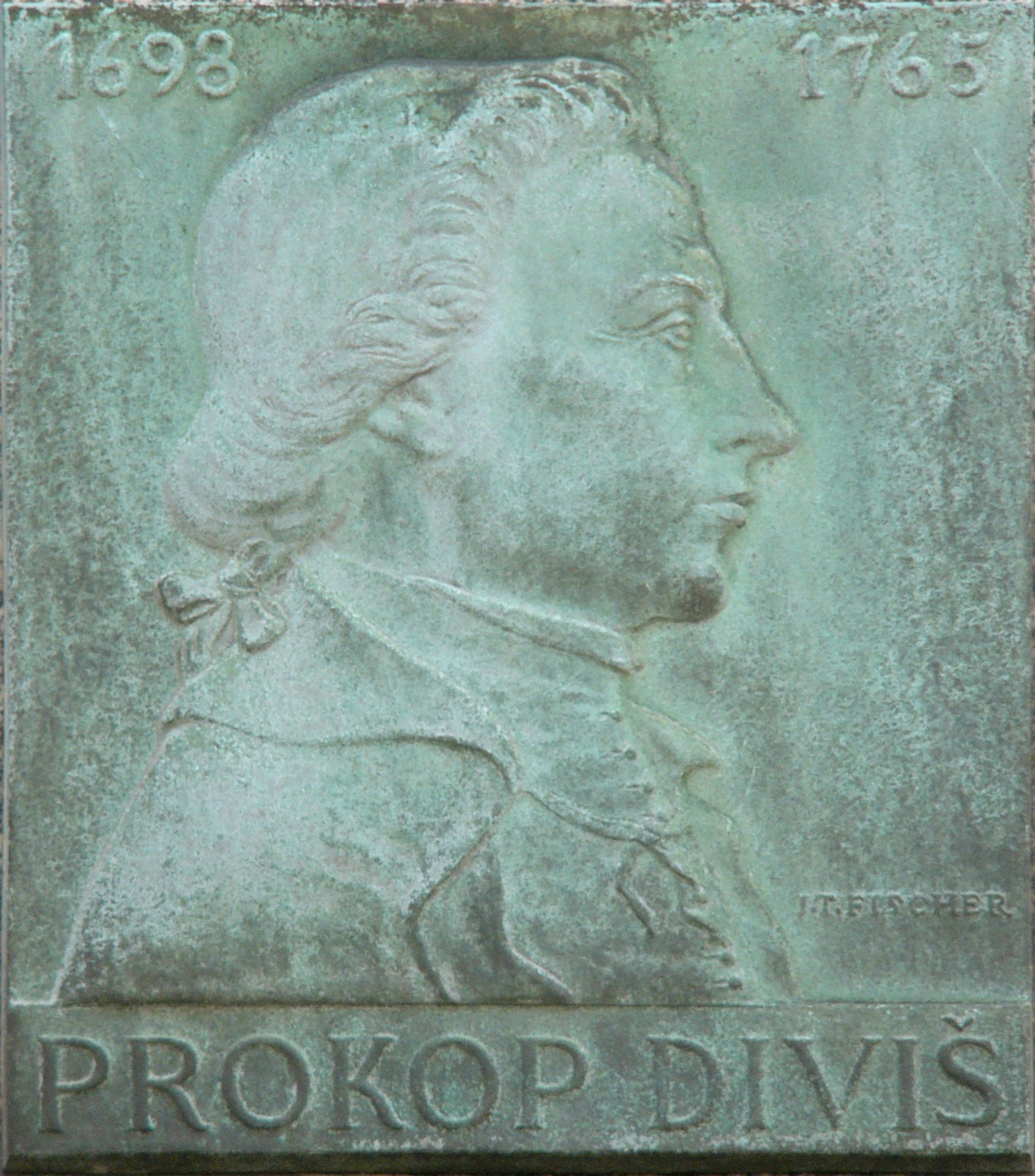
Plaque of Prokop Diviš by Jan Tomáš Fischer (1912–1957) at the former Jesuit gymnasium on Jezuitské Square in Znojmo.

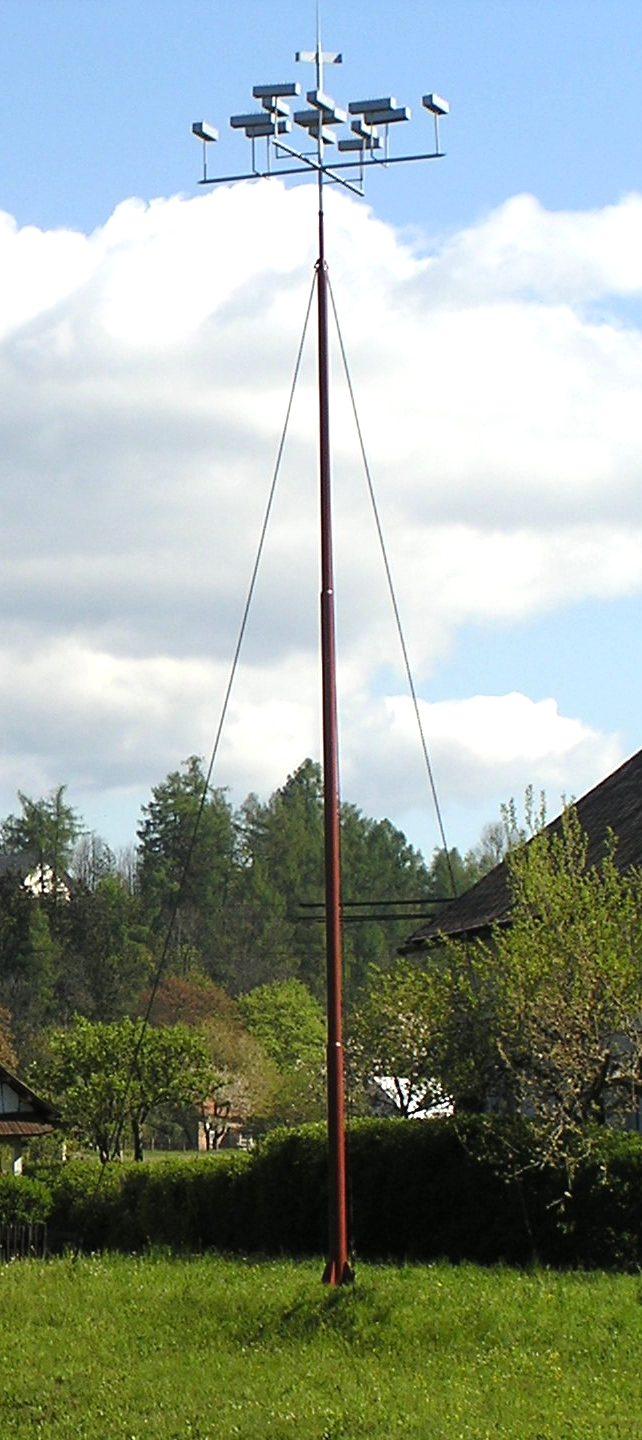
The "machina meteorologica" invented by Prokop Diviš worked like a lightning rod.

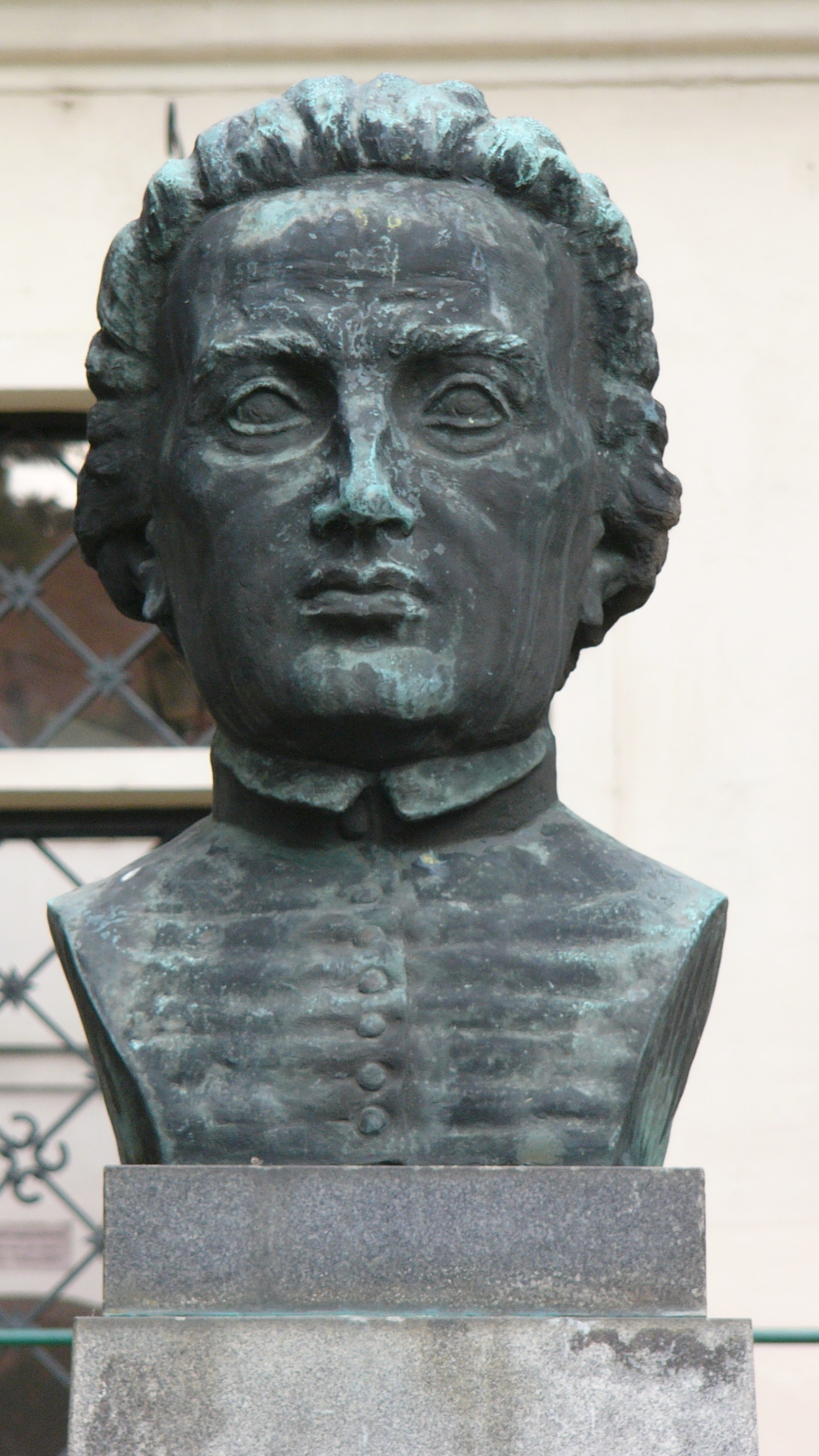
Bust of Prokop Diviš by Jan Tomáš Fischer in front of the former Jesuit gymnasium on Divišovo Square in Znojmo.

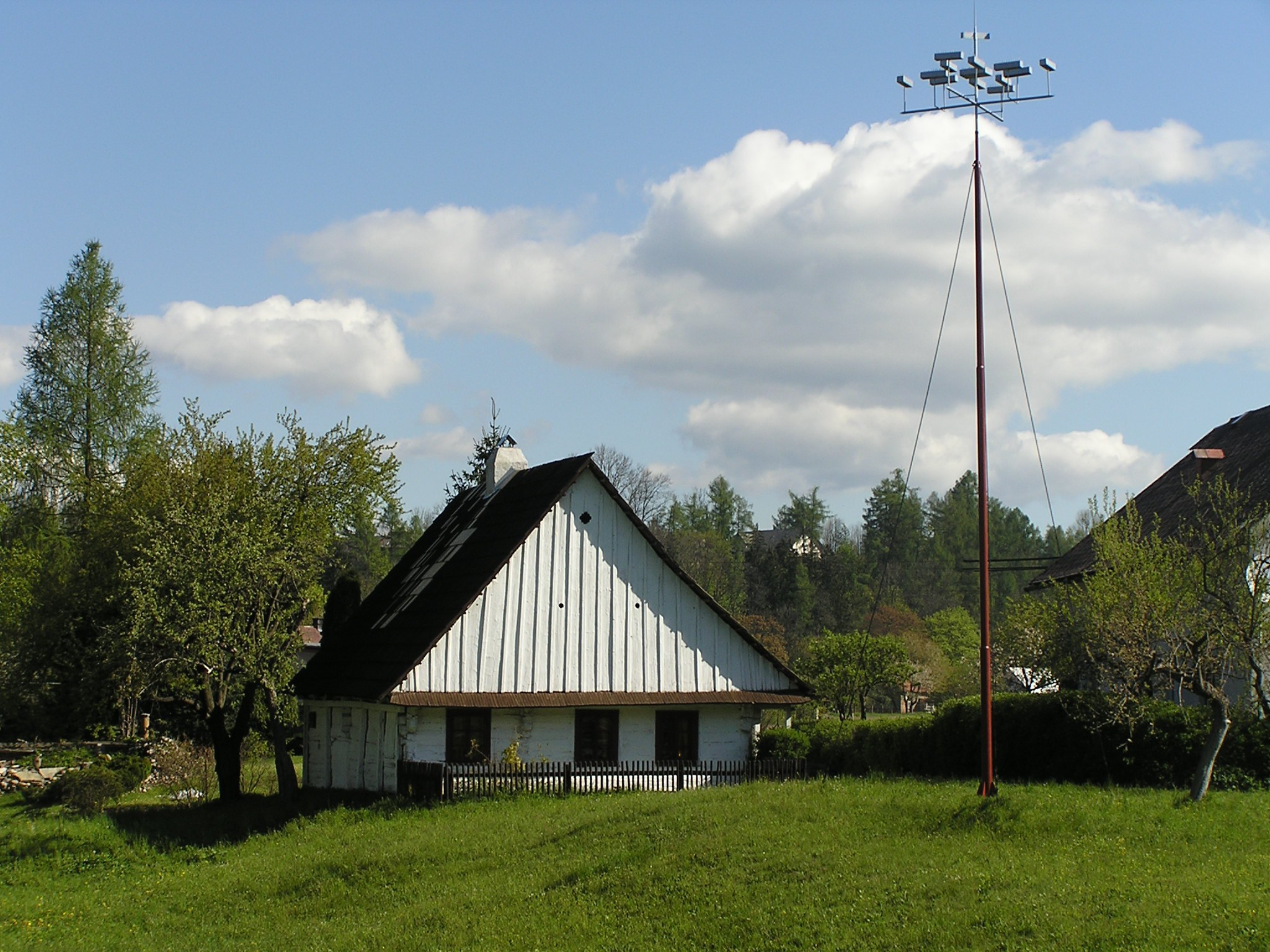
Family home of Prokop Diviš, "machina meteorologica" on the right.

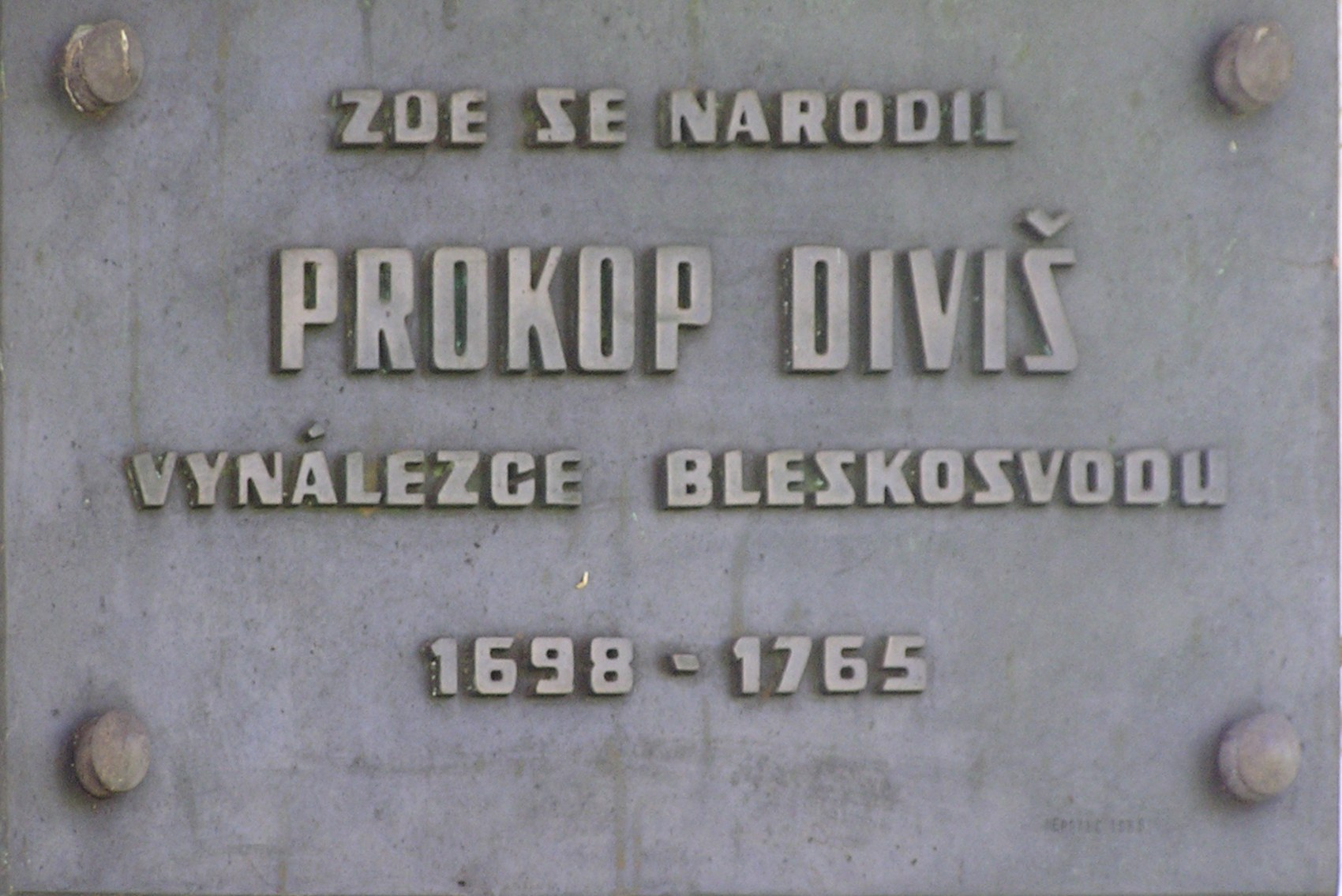
Plaque on Prokop Diviš' family home.

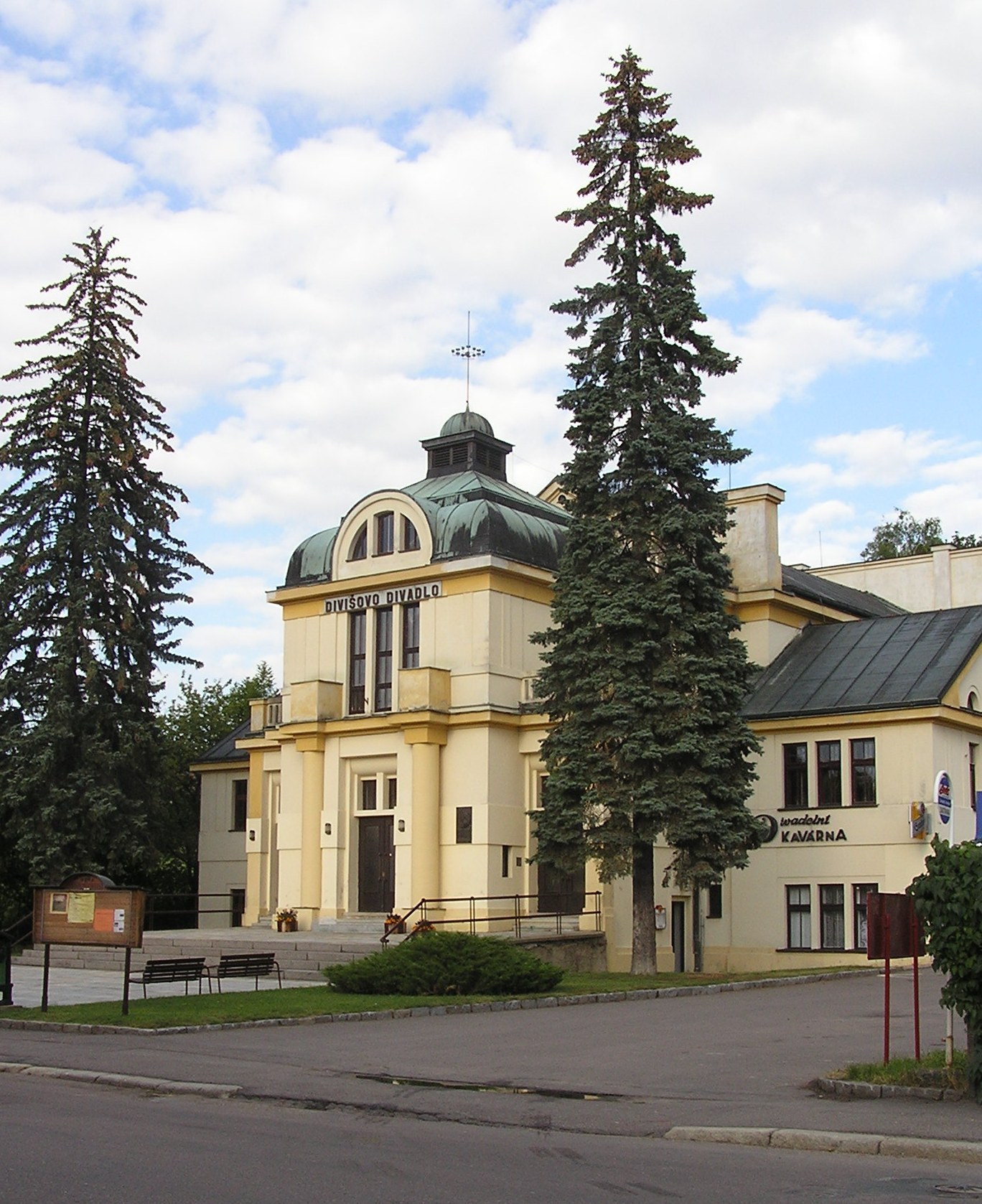
Prokop Diviš Theatre in Žamberk with "machina meteorologica" on the top.

Prokop Diviš O.Praem. (Czech pronunciation: [ˈprokop ˈɟɪvɪʃ]; (Note: German: Prokop Diwisch; Latin: Procopius Divis(ch)) 26 March 1698 – 21 December 1765) was a Czech canon regular, theologian, and natural scientist. In an effort to prevent thunderstorms, he inadvertently developed one of the earliest grounded lightning rods.

== Early life ==
Václav Divíšek was born on 26 March 1698 in Helvíkovice, Bohemia (now in the Ústí nad Orlicí District, Czech Republic). As a child, he began his education at the Jesuit gymnasium in his hometown. In 1716, at the age of 18, he entered a gymnasium operated by the Premonstratensian abbey in the village of Louka, where he completed his basic studies in 1719.

Following this, Divíšek entered the novitiate of the abbey and took the religious name Prokop (or Procopius). He completed his novitiate the following year and professed his vows in the Premonstratensian Order. He then studied philosophy and theology in preparation for ordination to the Catholic priesthood, which took place in 1726. From 1729 to 1735, he taught philosophy at the abbey's gymnasium. During this period, he was sent by his abbot to the Paris Lodron University in Salzburg (now the University of Salzburg) for advanced theological studies. In 1733, he completed his doctoral dissertation and was awarded the degree of Doctor of Theology.

Upon returning to the abbey, Diviš resumed his duties as a canon regular and was appointed sub-prior. In 1736, he was assigned as pastor of the parish in Přímětice (now part of Znojmo), which was under the care of the abbey. He served in this role for five years before being recalled to the abbey in April 1741, where he was appointed prior.

In the spring of the following year, during the First Silesian War, the abbot, Antonín Nolbek, was arrested by forces of the Kingdom of Prussia and imprisoned. Diviš arranged for his release by paying a substantial ransom. However, this action displeased the abbot, who subsequently reassigned Diviš to the parish in Přímětice.

== Scientist ==
Upon returning to the parish, Diviš took responsibility for managing its agricultural lands. He undertook the construction of water conduits on the property, which sparked his interest in a growing area of scientific inquiry at the time: electricity. Over the following years, he conducted a series of experiments, primarily focused on plant growth and the therapeutic use of low electrical voltages. He published his findings and reportedly demonstrated his work at the Imperial Court in Vienna.

Diviš also constructed an instrument known as the Denis d'or, which purportedly imitated the sounds of various musical instruments. The device, dated to 1753, was a novelty creation of which only one prototype is known to have existed; it disappeared shortly after Diviš's death. The instrument was also capable of delivering electric shocks as a form of practical joke. It remains disputed whether the Denis d'or produced its musical sounds through electrical means or functioned as a purely acoustic instrument.

The 1753 death of Georg Wilhelm Richmann, a professor in St. Petersburg who was fatally struck by lightning while attempting to measure atmospheric electric fields, prompted Diviš to explore the nature of atmospheric electricity. He wrote to several prominent physicists—including members of the academies of science in St. Petersburg and Vienna, and to Leonhard Euler—proposing the construction of a "weather machine" designed to suppress thunderstorms by continuously discharging atmospheric electricity. His proposals were considered unorthodox, even at the time, and were largely ignored. When he received no responses, Diviš proceeded to construct the device himself.

On 15 June 1754, he erected a forty-metre-high free-standing pole in Přímětice, on which he installed his "weather machine," consisting of multiple tin boxes and more than 400 metal spikes. The design was based on the then-prevalent belief that pointed spikes could efficiently conduct electricity. The pole was grounded by heavy metal chains, inadvertently making the structure one of the earliest grounded lightning rods. Diviš claimed the device was effective in dispersing storms: clouds allegedly formed when the machine was dismantled and dissipated when reinstalled. He interpreted these observations as evidence that the spikes were extracting latent electricity from the atmosphere, thereby preventing lightning formation. His experiments were reported in several local and regional newspapers in southern Germany.

Despite these efforts, his work was not well received by the broader scientific community, which generally dismissed his theories. In 1759, during a period of drought, local farmers in Přímětice destroyed his weather machine, blaming it for the adverse weather conditions. The resulting conflict between Diviš and the parishioners only ended after church authorities intervened, instructing him to cease his experiments. He was ordered to dismantle a second weather machine he had installed on the church tower for security reasons, and to return it to Louka Abbey.

Diviš continued to correspond with scientists and promote his ideas, which he termed Magia naturalis. With the assistance of two like-minded priests from Württemberg, Fricker and Oetinger, who had visited him during his experiments, he published his theory in Germany under the title Längst verlangte Theorie von der meteorologischen Electricité ("Long-desired theory of meteorological electricity") in the same year as his death. The publication was again largely overlooked, though a few years later, the philosopher Johannes Nikolaus Tetens reviewed the work and dismissed it as a product of fantasy.

== Death and legacy ==
Diviš died on 21 December 1765 in Přímětice.

After years of obscurity, interest in Diviš was revived in the late 19th century. He came to be regarded by some as a visionary inventor and is sometimes credited as the European co-inventor of the lightning rod, having conducted his experiments around the same time as Benjamin Franklin—possibly even independently.

Despite subsequent scientific analyses highlighting inaccuracies in his theories—such as the review by German physicist Heinrich Meidinger in 1888, and later assessments by Czech science historians Jaroslav Smolka and Vladimír Haubelt in 2004–2005—claims persist that Diviš invented a form of the lightning rod. Notably, the apparatus he erected in 1754 was more effectively grounded than Franklin's early experimental designs.

== See also ==
- List of Roman Catholic scientist-clerics

== Sources ==
- Reinhard Breymayer Bibliographie zu Prokop Diviš. In: Friedrich Christoph Oetinger: Die Lehrtafel der Prinzessin Antonia. Hrsg. von Reinhard Breymayer und Friedrich Häußermann; Teil 2. Anmerkungen. Berlin, New York: Walter de Gruyter & Co. 1977, pp. 431–453
- Luboš Nový (Ed.): Dějiny exaktních věd v českých zemích do konce 19. století. Prague 1961
- Wolfgang Grassl: Culture of Place: An Intellectual Profile of the Premonstratensian Order. Nordhausen: Bautz 2012.
