= Joachim Christian von Tresckow =

Joachim Friedrich Christian von Tresckow ( 28 September 1698 in Niegripp bei Magdeburg– 20 April 1762 in Neisse) was a Prussian Lieutenant General, Proprietor of the Prussian Infantry Regiment Nr. 32. He was a Knight of the Black Eagle Order and a recipient of the Order Pour le Mérite. He served Frederick the Great in the War of Austrian Succession and the Seven Years' War.
