= William Moraley =

William Moraley (1698–1762) was an Englishman who emigrated to Philadelphia, Pennsylvania in 1729 as an indentured servant. In his autobiography The Infourtunate: or the Voyage and Adventures of William Moraley, Written by Himself, originally published in 1743, Moraley gives a different view of colonial America, commenting on the lives of slaves, servants and Native Americans, topics not often mentioned by other writers of the time.

The book is used in college history courses, contrasting the lives of wealthy landowners and government figures with the lives of common people. It often is taught in conjunction with The Autobiography of Benjamin Franklin. Moraley describes flora, fauna and life in general as a commoner would, with a non-esoteric vernacular and little respect for scientific details.

An edition of this book published in 1992 and edited by Susan E. Klepp and Billy G. Smith has an extensive introduction with biographical information and commentary on the contrast between this work and others of the era.

== Sources ==
- The Infortunate: The Voyage And Adventures Of William Moraley, An Indentured Servant, by William Moraley, edited and with an introduction by Susan E. Klepp and Billy Gordon Smith
