= Jacob Johann Köhler =

Estonian printer

Jacob Johann Köhler (23 November 1698 in Narva – 1757 in Tallinn) was an Estonian printer who published the first Estonian-language Bible in 1739.
