= 1723 =

1723 in various calendars
- Gregorian calendar: 1723; MDCCXXIII
- Ab urbe condita: 2476
- Armenian calendar: 1172; ԹՎ ՌՃՀԲ
- Assyrian calendar: 6473
- Balinese saka calendar: 1644–1645
- Bengali calendar: 1129–1130
- Berber calendar: 2673
- British Regnal year: 9 Geo. 1 – 10 Geo. 1
- Buddhist calendar: 2267
- Burmese calendar: 1085
- Byzantine calendar: 7231–7232
- Chinese calendar: 壬寅年 (Water Tiger); 4420 or 4213 — to — 癸卯年 (Water Rabbit); 4421 or 4214
- Coptic calendar: 1439–1440
- Discordian calendar: 2889
- Ethiopian calendar: 1715–1716
- Hebrew calendar: 5483–5484
- Hindu calendars
- Vikram Samvat: 1779–1780
- Shaka Samvat: 1644–1645
- Kali Yuga: 4823–4824
- Holocene calendar: 11723
- Igbo calendar: 723–724
- Iranian calendar: 1101–1102
- Islamic calendar: 1135–1136
- Japanese calendar: Kyōhō 8 (享保８年)
- Javanese calendar: 1647–1648
- Julian calendar: Gregorian minus 11 days
- Korean calendar: 4056
- Minguo calendar: 189 before ROC 民前189年
- Nanakshahi calendar: 255
- Thai solar calendar: 2265–2266
- Tibetan calendar: ཆུ་ཕོ་སྟག་ལོ་ (male Water-Tiger); 1849 or 1468 or 696 — to — ཆུ་མོ་ཡོས་ལོ་ (female Water-Hare); 1850 or 1469 or 697

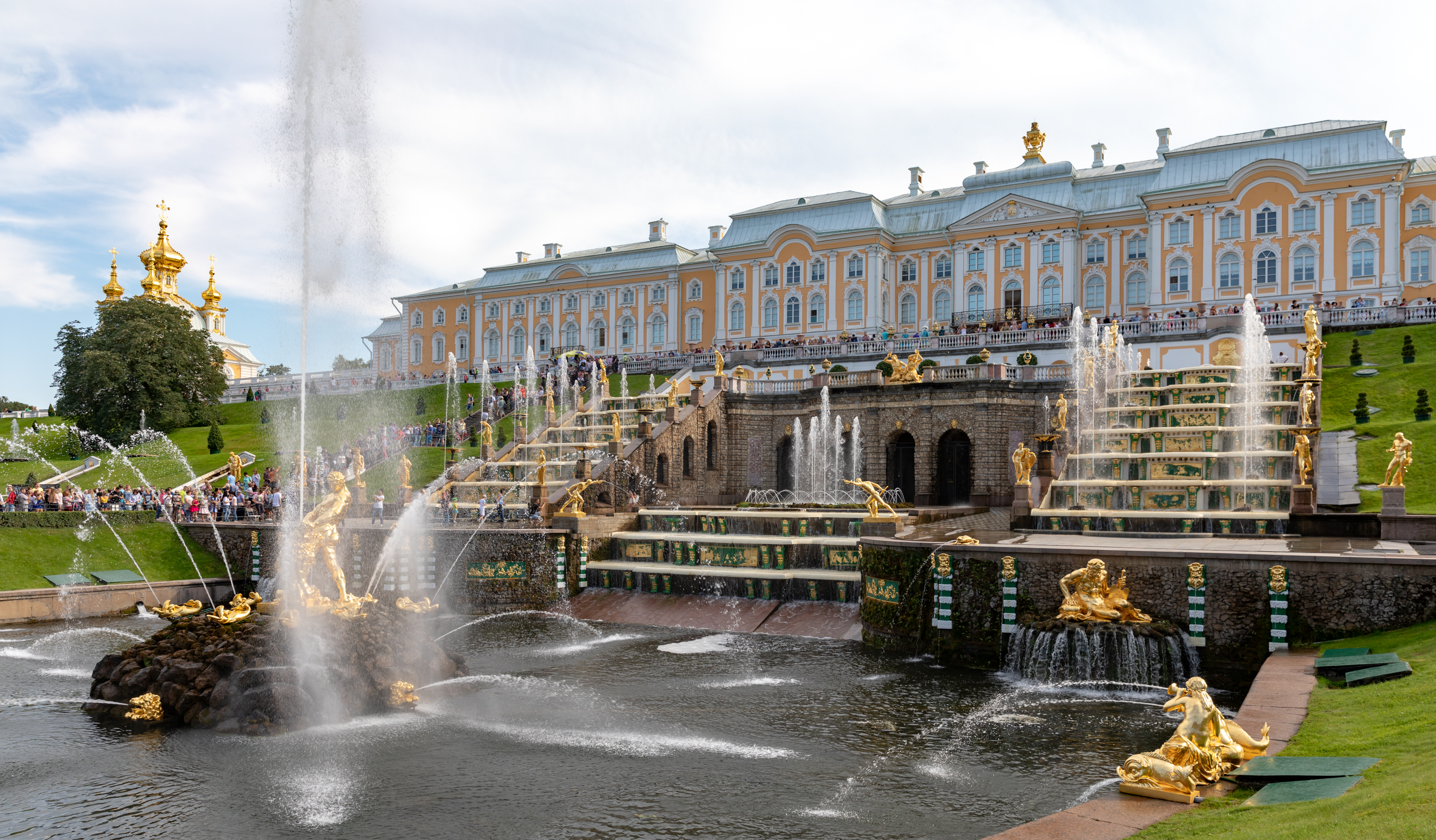
August 15: Peterhof Palace is formally dedicated in Saint Petersburg in the Russian Empire

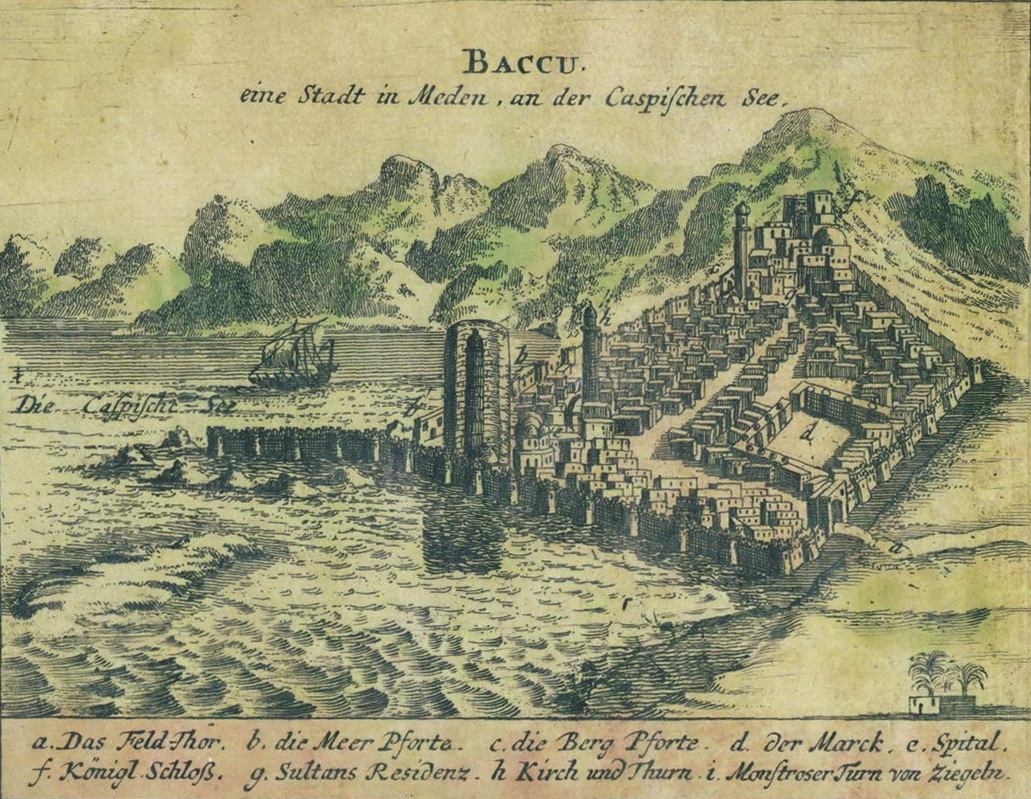
June 26: Baku surrenders to the Russians

1723 (MDCCXXIII) was a common year starting on Friday of the Gregorian calendar and a common year starting on Tuesday of the Julian calendar, the 1723rd year of the Common Era (CE) and Anno Domini (AD) designations, the 723rd year of the 2nd millennium, the 23rd year of the 18th century, and the 4th year of the 1720s decade. As of the start of 1723, the Gregorian calendar was 11 days ahead of the Julian calendar, which remained in localized use until 1923.

== Events ==
=== January–March ===
- January 25 – English-born pirate Edward Low intercepts the Portuguese ship Nostra Signiora de Victoria. After the Portuguese captain throws his treasure of 11,000 gold coins into the sea rather than surrendering it, Low orders the captain's brutal torture and execution, then has the rest of the Victoria crew murdered. Low commits more atrocities this year, but is not certainly heard of after the end of the year.
- February 4 – The Kangxi Era ends in Qing dynasty China, and the Yongzheng Era begins, with the coronation of Yinzhen, the Yongzheng Emperor.
- February 15 – King Louis XV of France attains his majority on his 13th birthday, bringing an end to the regency of his cousin Philippe II, Duke of Orléans.
- March 9 – The Mapuche Uprising begins in Chile as the indigenous Mapuche people, commanded by Toqui (war chief) Vilumilla, leading an attack against the city of Tucapel. The war lasts until February 13, 1726.
- March 28 – The capture of Rasht from the Persian Empire by the Russian Empire brings Rasht and the Gilan Province under Russian control.

=== April–June ===
- April 1 – In Switzerland, the attempt by Major Abraham Davel to make the canton of Vaud independent of the Swiss government, is put down, one day after he and 500 men had taken control of the Vaudois capital, Lausanne. Davel is arrested, tortured and tried for treason; he is beheaded on April 24.
- May 27 – The Black Act 1723, intended to combat illegal hunting in Great Britain, comes into force and expands the number of crimes that are punishable by death, and remains in effect for 100 years.
- May 30 – Johann Sebastian Bach assumed the office of Thomaskantor in Leipzig, presenting his first new cantata, Die Elenden sollen essen, BWV 75, in the St. Nicholas Church on the first Sunday after Trinity.
- June 26 – Russo-Persian War: Baku surrenders to the Russians.

=== July–September ===
- July 2 – Bach's Magnificat is first performed.
- July 12 – Christian von Wolff holds a lecture for students and the magistrates at the end of his term as a rector, as a result of which he is banned from Prussia, on a charge of atheism.
- July 18 – Johann Sebastian Bach leads the first performance of his cantata Erforsche mich, Gott, und erfahre mein Herz, BWV 136, in Leipzig on the eighth Sunday after Trinity.
- August 10 – Philippe II, Duke of Orléans, who had served as the Regent of France to rule for King Louis XV from 1715 until the latter's attainment of majority on February 15, is appointed by the King to serve as his Prime Minister, but dies in office less than four months later.
- August 11 – The Ostend Company is chartered by merchants and shipowners to establish trade for the Austrian Netherlands in the East Indies and West Indies. Over the next two days, 54 major investors in Antwerp purchase the shares of stock in the company.
- August 15 – The Peterhof Palace is opened in a formal ceremony just outside Saint Petersburg, capital of the Russian Empire.
- September 1 – The Treaty of Saint Petersburg is signed in Russia, ending the Russo-Persian War (1722–1723).
- September 14 – Grand Master of the Knights Hospitaller António Manoel de Vilhena lays down the first stone of Fort Manoel in Malta.

=== October–December ===
- October 23 – Russian Emperor Peter the Great authorizes an incentive for men of Serbia to join a new Russian Imperial Army unit, the Serbian Hussar Regiment. The Emperor sends Jovan Albanez to recruit new officers and troops with a grant of farmable land in Russia, and 1,070 take advantage of the offer over the next two years.
- October 31 – Gian Gastone de' Medici becomes the new Grand Duke of Tuscany upon the death of his father Cosimo III de' Medici; he will be the state's last ruler from the House of Medici. During his reign, the state treasury is depleted and Tuscany becomes one of the poorest nations in Europe.
- November 23 – The Province of Carolina charters New Bern as Newbern (the town later becomes the capital of North Carolina until Raleigh is founded).
- December 2 – Philippe II, Duke of Orléans, regent of France from 1715 to 1723, and Prime Minister since August 10, dies at the age of 49 at Versailles.
- December 26 – Bach leads the first performance of Darzu ist erschienen der Sohn Gottes, BWV 40, his first Christmas Cantata composed for Leipzig.

=== Date unknown ===
- The Province of Carolina incorporates Beaufort, North Carolina, as the Port of Beaufort, making it the third incorporated town in the province.

== Births ==
- January 5 – Nicole-Reine Lepaute, French astronomer, mathematician (d. 1788)
- January 11 – Prithvi Narayan Shah, First Monarch of Nepal (d. 1775)
- January 12 – Samuel Langdon, American President of Harvard University (d. 1797)
- January 31 – Petronella Johanna de Timmerman, Dutch poet, scientist (d. 1786)
- February 15 – John Witherspoon, American signer of the Declaration of Independence (d. 1794)
- February 17 – Tobias Mayer, German astronomer (d. 1761)
- February 21 – Louis-Pierre Anquetil, French historian (d. 1808)
- February 23 – Richard Price, Welsh philosopher (d. 1791)
- March 22 – Charles Carroll, American lawyer, Continental Congressman (d. 1783)
- March 25 – Catharina Mulder, Dutch organist (d. 1798)
- March 31 – King Frederick V of Denmark (d. 1766)
- April 5 – Catherine Charlotte De la Gardie, Swedish countess (d. 1763)
- April 20 – Cornelius Harnett, American Continental Congressman (d. 1781)
- April 30 – Mathurin Jacques Brisson, French naturalist (d. 1806)
- June 3 – Giovanni Antonio Scopoli, Italian-born physician, naturalist (d. 1788)
- June 11 – Johann Georg Palitzsch, German astronomer (d. 1788)

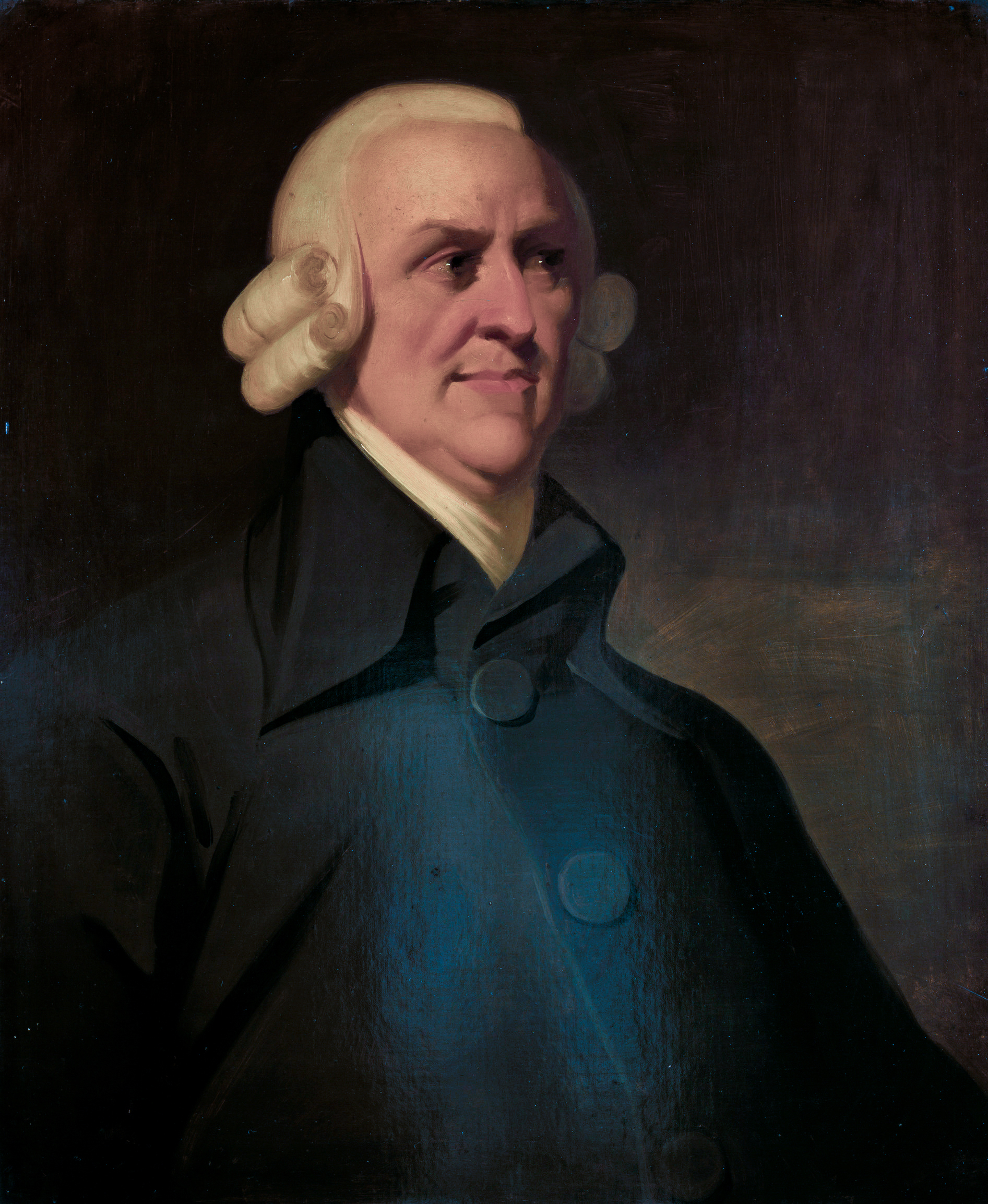
Adam Smith

- June 16 – (baptised) Adam Smith, Scottish economist, philosopher (d. 1790)
- June 20
  - Adam Ferguson, Scottish philosopher, historian (d. 1816)
  - Theophilus Lindsey, English theologian (d. 1808)
- July 1 – Pedro Rodríguez, Count of Campomanes, Spanish statesman, writer (d. 1802)
- July 10 – William Blackstone, English jurist (d. 1780)
- July 11 – Jean-François Marmontel, French historian, writer (d. 1799)
- July 16 – Sir Joshua Reynolds, English painter (d. 1792)
- September 11 – Johann Bernhard Basedow, German educational reformer (d. 1790)
- October 4 – Nikolaus Poda von Neuhaus, German entomologist (d. 1798)
- October 11 – Hedvig Strömfelt, Swedish psalm writer (d. 1766)
- November 8 – John Byron, English admiral (d. 1786)
- November 30 – William Livingston, American politician, journalist (d. 1790)
- December 22 – Carl Friedrich Abel, German composer (d. 1787)
- December 26 – Friedrich Melchior, baron von Grimm, German writer (d. 1807)
- Date unknown
  - Carl Albert von Lespilliez, German draftsman, architect and printmaker (d. 1796)
  - Eva Merthen, Finnish political activist (d. 1811)

== Deaths ==
- January 14 – Charles Henri, Prince of Commercy (b. 1649)
- January 23 – William Phippard, English politician (b. 1649)
- February 23 – Anne Henriette of Bavaria, Duchess of Guise (b. 1648)

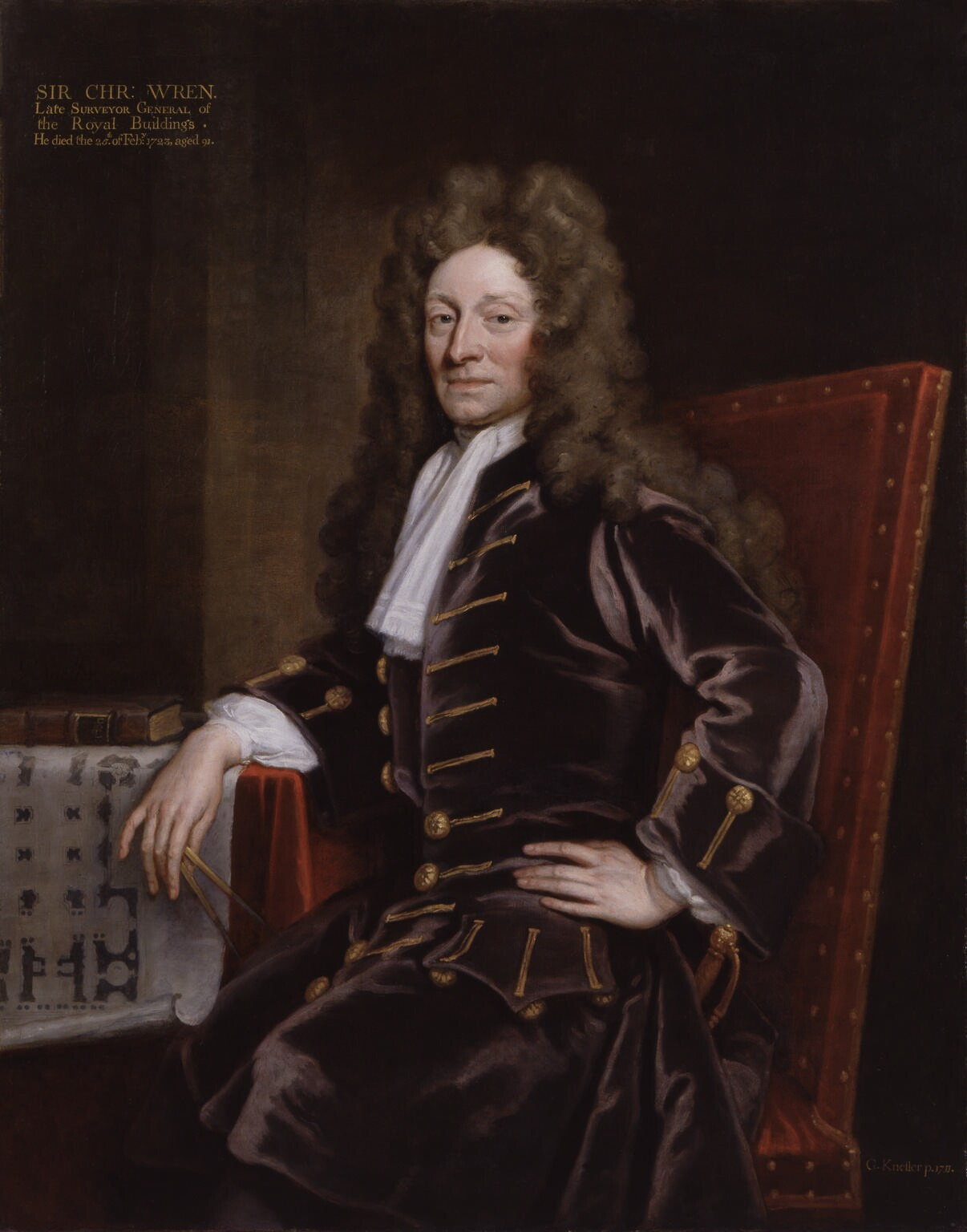
Christopher Wren

- February 25 – Sir Christopher Wren, English architect, astronomer and mathematician (b. 1632)
- February 26 – Thomas d'Urfey, English writer (b. 1653)
- March 13 – René Auguste Constantin de Renneville, French writer (b. 1650)
- March 15 – Johann Christian Günther, German poet (b. 1695)
- March 30 – Filippo Bonanni, Italian Jesuit scholar (b. 1638)
- March 31 – Edward Hyde, 3rd Earl of Clarendon, British Governor of New York and New Jersey (b. 1661)
- April 5 – Johann Bernhard Fischer von Erlach, Austrian architect (b. 1656)
- April 11 – John Robinson, English diplomat (b. 1650)
- May 2 – Christopher of Baden-Durlach, German prince (b. 1684)
- May 11 – Jean Galbert de Campistron, French dramatist (b. 1656)
- May 12 – Johannes Voorhout, Dutch painter (b. 1647)
- May 29 – Jean de La Chapelle, French writer and dramatist (b. 1651)
- June 4 – Léopold Clément, Hereditary Prince of Lorraine, French prince (b. 1707)
- June 8 – Isaac Chayyim Cantarini, Italian rabbi (b. 1644)
- June 14 – Richard Newport, 2nd Earl of Bradford, English politician (b. 1644)
- July 14 – Claude Fleury, French historian (b. 1640)
- July 26 – Robert Bertie, 1st Duke of Ancaster and Kesteven, English statesman (b. 1660)
- July 28 – Mariana Alcoforado, Portuguese nun (b. 1640)
- August 4 – William Fleetwood, Anglican bishop (b. 1656)
- August 10 – Guillaume Dubois, French cardinal, statesman (b. 1656)
- August 14 – Edward Northey (barrister), British barrister and politician (b. 1652)
- August 17 – Joseph Bingham, English scholar (b. 1668)
- August 21 – Dimitrie Cantemir, Moldavian linguist and scholar (b. 1673)
- August 23 – Increase Mather, American Puritan minister (b. 1639)

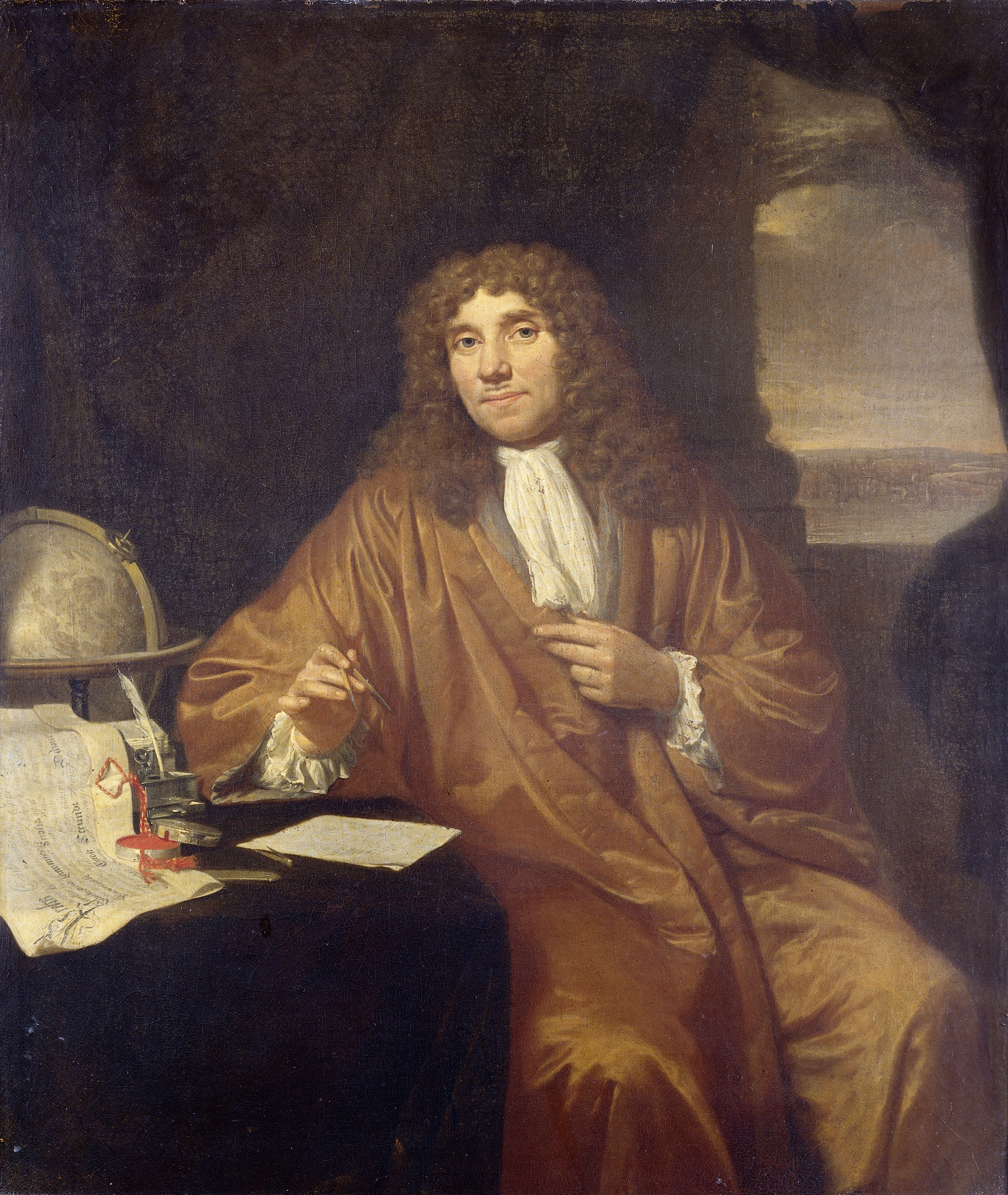
Antonie van Leeuwenhoek

- August 26 – Antonie van Leeuwenhoek, Dutch scientist (b. 1632)
- September 19 – Robert Sutton, 2nd Baron Lexinton, English diplomat (b. 1662)
- October 1 – Frédéric Maurice Casimir de La Tour d'Auvergne, French prince (b. 1702)
- October 10 – William Cowper, 1st Earl Cowper, Lord Chancellor of England (b. c. 1665)
- October 13 – Praskovia Saltykova, Russian tsarina (b. 1664)
- October 19 – Godfrey Kneller, German-born artist (b. 1646)
- October 28 – Christopher Vane, 1st Baron Barnard, English politician and peer (b. 1653)
- October 31 – Cosimo III de' Medici, Grand Duke of Tuscany (b. 1642)
- November 19 – Antoine Nompar de Caumont, French courtier and statesman (b. 1632)
- December 1 – Susanna Centlivre, English dramatist, actress (b. 1669)
- December 2 – Philippe II, Duke of Orléans, regent of France (b. 1674)
- December 7 – Jan Santini Aichel, Czech architect (b. 1677)
- December 20 – Augustus Quirinus Rivinus, German physician, botanist (b. 1652)
