= 1766 =

1766 in various calendars
- Gregorian calendar: 1766; MDCCLXVI
- Ab urbe condita: 2519
- Armenian calendar: 1215; ԹՎ ՌՄԺԵ
- Assyrian calendar: 6516
- Balinese saka calendar: 1687–1688
- Bengali calendar: 1172–1173
- Berber calendar: 2716
- British Regnal year: 6 Geo. 3 – 7 Geo. 3
- Buddhist calendar: 2310
- Burmese calendar: 1128
- Byzantine calendar: 7274–7275
- Chinese calendar: 乙酉年 (Wood Rooster); 4463 or 4256 — to — 丙戌年 (Fire Dog); 4464 or 4257
- Coptic calendar: 1482–1483
- Discordian calendar: 2932
- Ethiopian calendar: 1758–1759
- Hebrew calendar: 5526–5527
- Hindu calendars
- Vikram Samvat: 1822–1823
- Shaka Samvat: 1687–1688
- Kali Yuga: 4866–4867
- Holocene calendar: 11766
- Igbo calendar: 766–767
- Iranian calendar: 1144–1145
- Islamic calendar: 1179–1180
- Japanese calendar: Meiwa 3 (明和３年)
- Javanese calendar: 1691–1692
- Julian calendar: Gregorian minus 11 days
- Korean calendar: 4099
- Minguo calendar: 146 before ROC 民前146年
- Nanakshahi calendar: 298
- Thai solar calendar: 2308–2309
- Tibetan calendar: ཤིང་མོ་བྱ་ལོ་ (female Wood-Bird); 1892 or 1511 or 739 — to — མེ་ཕོ་ཁྱི་ལོ་ (male Fire-Dog); 1893 or 1512 or 740

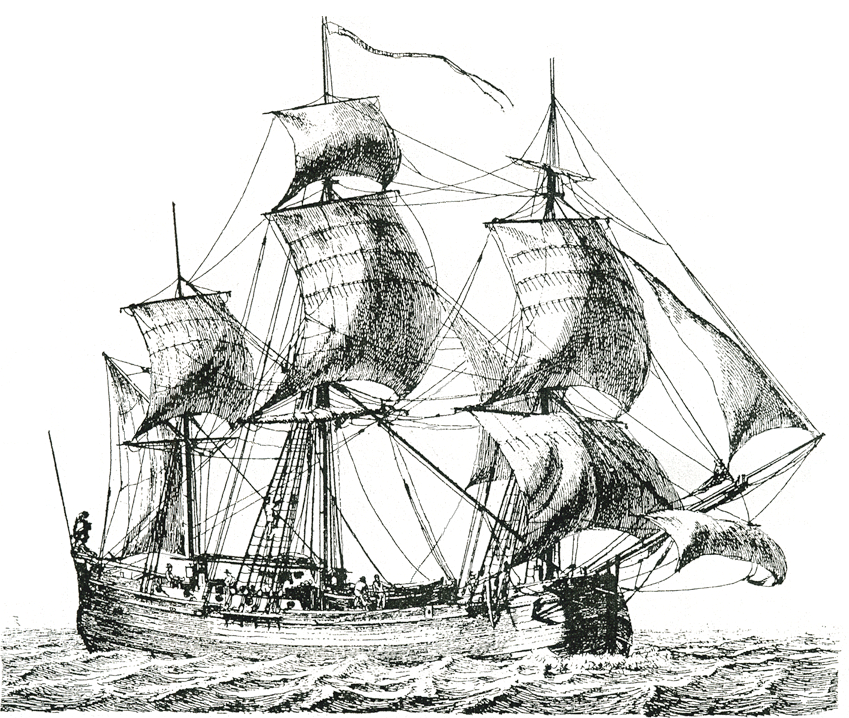
February 18: Malagasy slaves take control of the Dutch ship Meermin.

1766 (MDCCLXVI) was a common year starting on Wednesday of the Gregorian calendar and a common year starting on Sunday of the Julian calendar, the 1766th year of the Common Era (CE) and Anno Domini (AD) designations, the 766th year of the 2nd millennium, the 66th year of the 18th century, and the 7th year of the 1760s decade. As of the start of 1766, the Gregorian calendar was 11 days ahead of the Julian calendar, which remained in localized use until 1923.

== Events ==
=== January–March ===
- January 1 – Charles Edward Stuart ("Bonnie Prince Charlie") becomes the new Stuart claimant to the throne of Great Britain, as King Charles III, and figurehead for Jacobitism.
- January 14 – Christian VII becomes King of Denmark-Norway.
- January 20 – Burmese–Siamese War: Outside of the walls of the Thailand capital of Ayutthaya, tens of thousands of invaders from Burma (under the command of General Ne Myo Thihapate and General Maha Nawatra) are confronted by Thai defenders led by General Phya Taksin. The defenders are overwhelmed and the survivors take refuge inside Ayutthaya. The siege continues for 15 months before the Burmese attackers collapse the walls by digging tunnels and setting fire to debris. The city falls on April 9, 1767, and King Ekkathat is killed.
- February 5 – An observer in Wilmington, North Carolina reports to the Edinburgh newspaper Caledonian Mercury that three ships have been seized by British men-of-war, on the charge of carrying official documents without stamps. The strict enforcement causes seven other ships to leave Wilmington for other ports.
- February 13 – John Mills is elected a Fellow of the Royal Society, with Benjamin Franklin as one of his sponsors.
- February 15 – Protesting against the Stamp Act 1765, members of the New York City Sons of Liberty travel to Pennsylvania and set fire to a British supply of tax stamps before the stamps can be taken to distributors in the province of Maryland.
- February 18 – Meermin Slave Mutiny: Captive Malagasy people seize a Dutch East India Company slave ship in the Indian Ocean.
- February 20 – The Pennsylvania Gazette reports that a British sloop off Wilmington, North Carolina, has seized a sloop sailing from Philadelphia, and another sailing from Saint Christopher, on the charge of carrying official documents without stamps. In response, local residents threaten to burn a Royal Man-of-War attempting to deliver stamps to Wilmington, forcing the ship to return to the mouth of the Cape Fear River.
- February 23 – Lorraine and Bar become French again, on the death of Stanisław Leszczyński, King of Poland and last Duke of Lorraine.
- February – Ferocious wolf attacks occur in France, such as the Beast of Gévaudan or Wolves of Périgord.
- March 5 – Antonio de Ulloa, the first Spanish governor of Louisiana, arrives in New Orleans.
- March 18 – American Revolution: The British Parliament repeals the Stamp Act, which has been very unpopular in the British colonies; the persuasion of Benjamin Franklin is considered partly responsible. The Declaratory Act asserts the right of Britain to bind the colonies in all other respects.

=== April–June ===
- April 3 – Seventeen days after the Stamp Act's repeal in London, news reaches America of the decision.
- April 9
  - African slaves are imported directly into the American colony of Georgia for the first time, as the sloop Mary Brow arrives in Savannah with 78 captives imported from Saint-Louis, Senegal.
  - American botanist John Bartram completes his first exploration and cataloging of North American plants after more than nine months.
- April 17 – King Carlos III of Spain issues a royal cédula from Aranjuez to round up all ethnic Chinese in the Philippines and to move them to ghettoes in various provinces.
- May 29 – In a paper read to the Royal Society, British theoretical chemist Henry Cavendish first describes his process of producing what he refers to as "inflammable air" by dissolving base metals such as iron, zinc and tin in a flask of sulfuric acid or hydrochloric acid, drawing the conclusion that the vapor that was released is different from air. Seven years later, French chemist Antoine Lavoisier bestows the name "hydrogen" on the gas.
- May 30 – The Theatre Royal, Bristol, opens in England. Also this year in England, the surviving Georgian Theatre (Stockton-on-Tees) opens as a playhouse.
- June 4 – On the occasion of the 28th birthday of King George III, members of the Sons of Liberty in Manhattan erect a liberty pole as a protest for the first time. The historic symbol, a tall "wooden pole with a Phrygian cap" is placed "on the Fields somewhere between Broadway and Park Row". British soldiers cut down the pole in August.

=== July–September ===
- July 1 – François-Jean de la Barre, a young French nobleman, is tortured and beheaded, before his body is burnt on a pyre, along with a copy of Voltaire's Dictionnaire philosophique nailed to his torso, supposedly for the crime of not saluting a Roman Catholic religious procession in Abbeville, and for other sacrileges, including desecrating a crucifix.
- August 10 – During the occupation of New York, members of the 28th Foot Regiment of the British Army chop down the liberty pole that was erected by the Sons of Liberty on June 4. The Sons of Liberty put up a second pole the next day, and that pole is cut down on August 22.
- August 13 – A hurricane sweeps across the French island colony of Martinique, killing more than 400 people and destroying the plantation owned by Joseph-Gaspard de La Pagerie, the father of the future French Empress Joséphine.
- September 1 – The revolt in Quito (at this time part of Spain's Viceroyalty of Nueva Granada; the modern-day capital of Ecuador) is ended peacefully as royal forces enter the city under the command of Guayaquil Governor Pedro Zelaya. Rather than seeking retribution from the Quito citizens over their insurrection that has broken the monopoly over the sale of the liquor aguardiente, Zeleaya oversees a program of reconciliation.
- September 13 – The position of Patriarch of the Serbs, established on April 9, 1346 as the authority over the Serbian Orthodox Church, is abolished by order of Sultan Mustafa III of the Ottoman Empire; the patriarchate is not re-established until 1920 following the creation of Yugoslavia at the end of World War One.
- September 23 – John Penn, the Colonial Governor of Pennsylvania and one of the four Penn family owners of the Pennsylvania land grant, issues a proclamation forbidding British American colonist residents from building settlements on lands in the west "not yet purchased of the Nations" of the Iroquois Indians.

=== October–December ===
- October 1 – Crown Prince Gustav of Sweden weds Princess Sophia Magdalena of Denmark. They become King Gustav III and Queen Consort Sophia of Sweden upon his ascension to the throne in 1771.
- October 4 – The kingdom of France formally cedes its rights to the Malouines Islands to Spain. On March 24, Spain renames the islands the Malvinas, and in 1833, the United Kingdom re-colonises the recently abandoned territory and renames it the Falkland Islands.
- November – Raja Lumu consolidates his claim to the Selangor Sultanate by marriage to the niece of the Sultan of Perak.
- November 10 – The last Colonial governor of New Jersey, William Franklin, signs the charter of Queen's College (later renamed Rutgers University).
- November 27 – A British sloop-of-war is searching all vessels passing near Cape Lookout, North Carolina, and some vessels have been seized, according to an observer in New York City, in the Province of New York, reporting to the Pennsylvania Gazette.
- November 29 – Wolfgang Amadeus Mozart returns to Salzburg, after the Mozart family grand tour of Europe.
- December 2 – The Law on the Freedom of Printing abolishes censorship in Sweden and guarantees freedom of the press, making Sweden the first country of the world to introduce constitutional protection of press freedom, and to pass wide-ranging freedom of information legislation.
- December 5 – James Christie holds the first sale at Christie's auction house in London.
- December 25 – Mapuches in Chile launch a series of surprise attacks against the Spanish starting the Mapuche uprising of 1766.

=== Date unknown ===
- Childsburgh, the Orange County, North Carolina seat laid out as Corbin Town in 1754, and renamed in 1759, is renamed Hillsborough, in honor of Wills Hill, 1st Marquess of Downshire, Earl of Hillsborough.
- Dr. James Fordyce's two-volume compendium Sermons to Young Women is published in London.

== Births ==
- January 1 – Magdalena Rudenschöld, Swedish conspirator (d. 1823)
- January 3 – Nguyễn Du, Vietnamese poet (d. 1820)
- January 6 – José Gaspar Rodríguez de Francia, Supreme Leader of Paraguay (d. 1840)
- January 17 – Joseph Kinghorn, Particular Baptist Minister (d. 1832)
- February 11 – Henry Fourdrinier, British engineer, inventor (d. 1854)
- February 14 – Thomas Malthus, English demographer, economist (d. 1834)
- February 24 – Samuel Wesley, English organist and composer (died 1837)
- April 1 – François-Xavier Fabre, French painter of historical subjects (d. 1837)
- April 6 – Charles-Louis de Fourcroy, French Consul at A Coruña, Chevalier de la Légion d'honneur (d. 1824)
- April 22 – Germaine de Staël, French author (d. 1817)
- May 11 – Isaac D'Israeli, English literary scholar (died 1848)
- May 30 – Robert Darwin, medical doctor and father of Charles Darwin (d. 1848)
- June 13 – Jean-Frédéric Waldeck, French cartographer (d. 1875)
- July 8 – Dominique Jean Larrey, French surgeon, innovator in battlefield medicine (d. 1842)
- July 9 – Jacob Perkins, American physicist, inventor and engineer (d. 1849)
- July 21 – Thomas Charles Hope, Scottish chemist, discoverer of strontium (d. 1844)

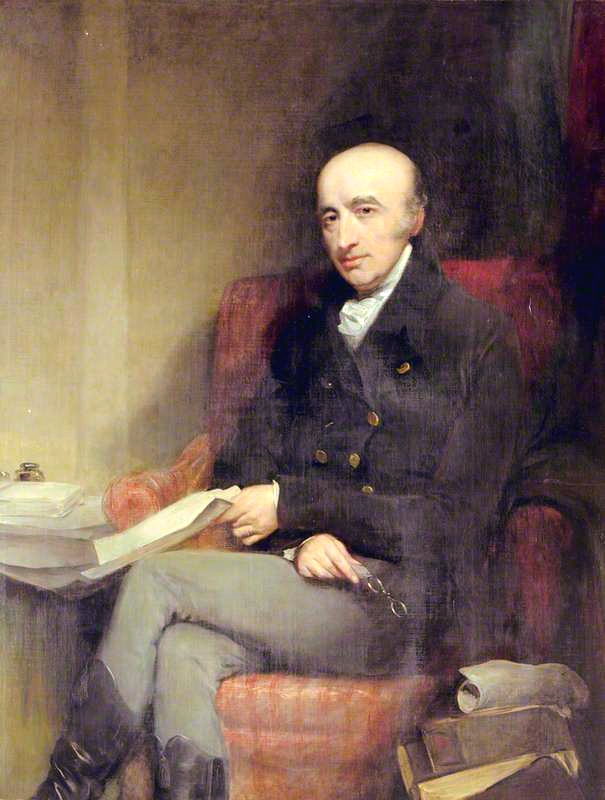
William Hyde Wollaston

- August 6 – William Hyde Wollaston, English chemist (d. 1828)

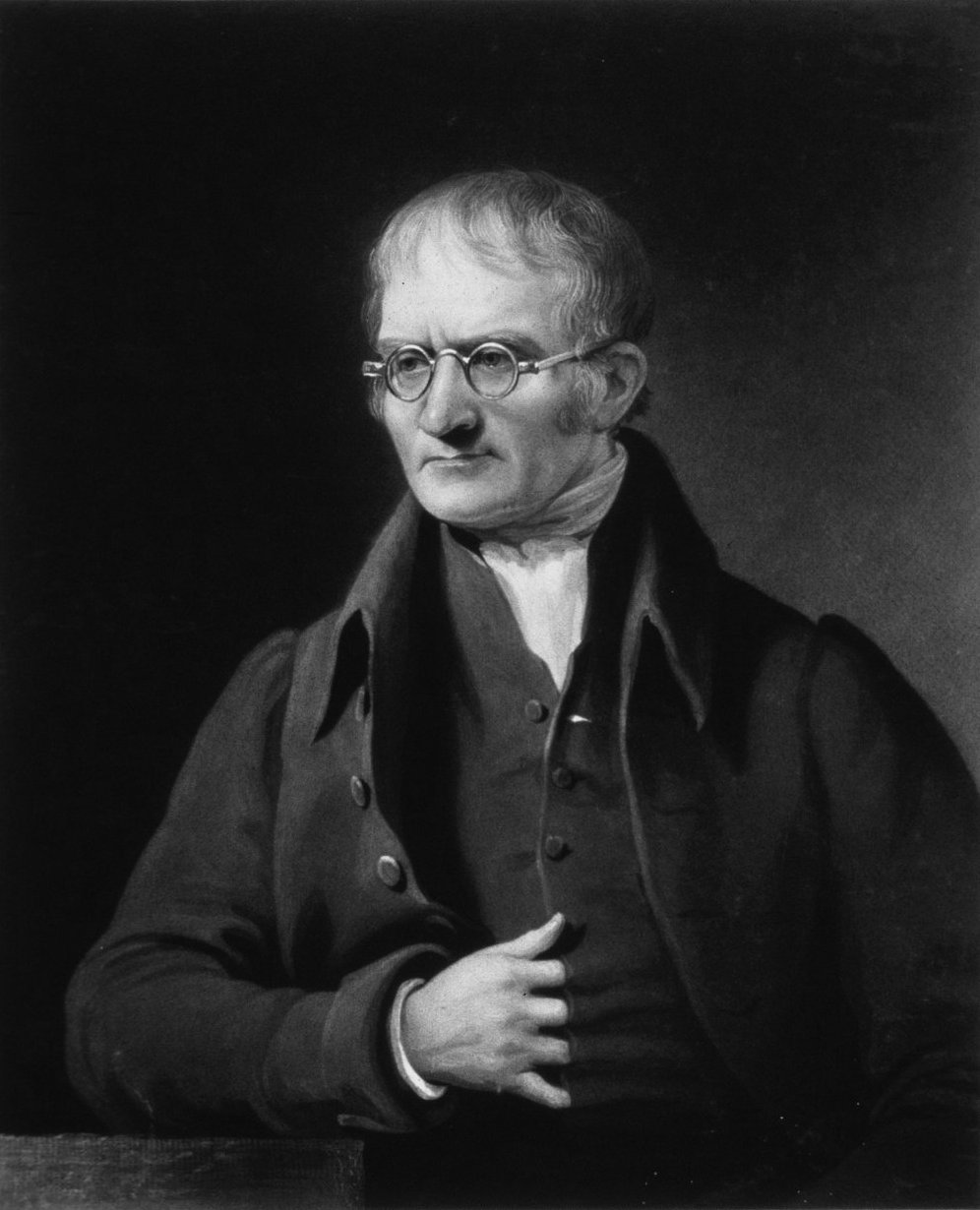
John Dalton

- September 6 – John Dalton, English chemist and physicist (d. 1844)
- September 25 – Armand-Emmanuel de Vignerot du Plessis, Duc de Richelieu, Prime Minister of France (d. 1822)
- October 3 – John Walbach, French baron and officer in the United States Army, with a military career spanning over 57 years (d. 1857)
- October 23 – Emmanuel de Grouchy, Marquis de Grouchy, French marshal (d. 1847)
- November 2 – Joseph Radetzky von Radetz, Austrian field marshal (d. 1858)
- November 9 – Edward Abbott, Australian soldier, politician and judge (d. 1832)
- November 12 – Daniel Sykes, English politician (d. 1832)
- November 16 – Rodolphe Kreutzer, violinist and composer (d. 1831)
- December 3 – Barbara Fritchie, U.S. patriot in the Civil War (d. 1862)
- December 23 – Wilhelm Hisinger, Swedish physicist and chemist (d. 1852)
- December 29 – Charles Macintosh, Scottish inventor of a waterproof fabric (died 1843)
- date unknown – Lolotte Forssberg, Swedish courtier (d. 1840)

== Deaths ==
- January 1 – James Francis Edward Stuart, The Old Pretender to the British throne (b. 1688)
- January 9 – Thomas Birch, English historian (b. 1705)
- January 14 – King Frederick V of Denmark (b. 1723)
- January 19 – Giovanni Niccolò Servandoni, French architect and painter (b. 1695)
- January 21 – James Quin, English actor (b. 1693)
- February 5 – Count Leopold Joseph von Daun, Austrian field marshal (b. 1705)
- February 23 – Stanisław Leszczyński, King of Poland (b. 1677)
- March 7 – Ercole Lelli, Italian painter of the late-Baroque (b. 1702)
- March 10 – Jane Colden, American botanist (b. 1724)
- April 4 – John Taylor, English classical scholar (b. 1704)
- April 7 – Tiberius Hemsterhuis, Dutch philologist, critic (b. 1685)
- May 5 – Jean Astruc, French physician, scholar (b. 1684)
- May 8 – Samuel Chandler, English non-conformist minister (b. 1693)
- May 20 – Malhar Rao Holkar, Indian nobleman (b. 1693)
- May 22 – Hedvig Strömfelt, Swedish psalm writer (b. 1723)
- June 13 – Isaac Norris (statesman), American politician (b. 1701)
- June 22 – Carlo Zimech, Maltese priest and painter (b. 1696)
- June 24 – Adrien Maurice de Noailles, 3rd Duke of Noailles, French soldier (b. 1678)
- July 9 – Jonathan Mayhew, American minister, patriot (b. 1720)
- July 11 – Elisabeth Farnese, queen of Philip V of Spain (b. 1692)
- July 14 – František Maxmilián Kaňka, Czech architect (b. 1674)
- July 17
  - Giuseppe Castiglione, Italian missionary to China (b. 1688)
  - Samuel Finley, American clergyman and educator (b. 1715)
- September 3 – Archibald Bower, Scottish historian (b. 1686)
- September 13 – Benjamin Heath, English classical scholar (b. 1704)
- September 23 – John Brown, English divine and author (b. 1715)
- November 7 – Jean-Marc Nattier, French painter (b. 1685)
- November 9 – Unico Wilhelm van Wassenaer, Dutch composer (b. 1692)
- December 12 – Johann Christoph Gottsched, German writer (b. 1700)
