= François de Cuvilliés the Younger =

German architect

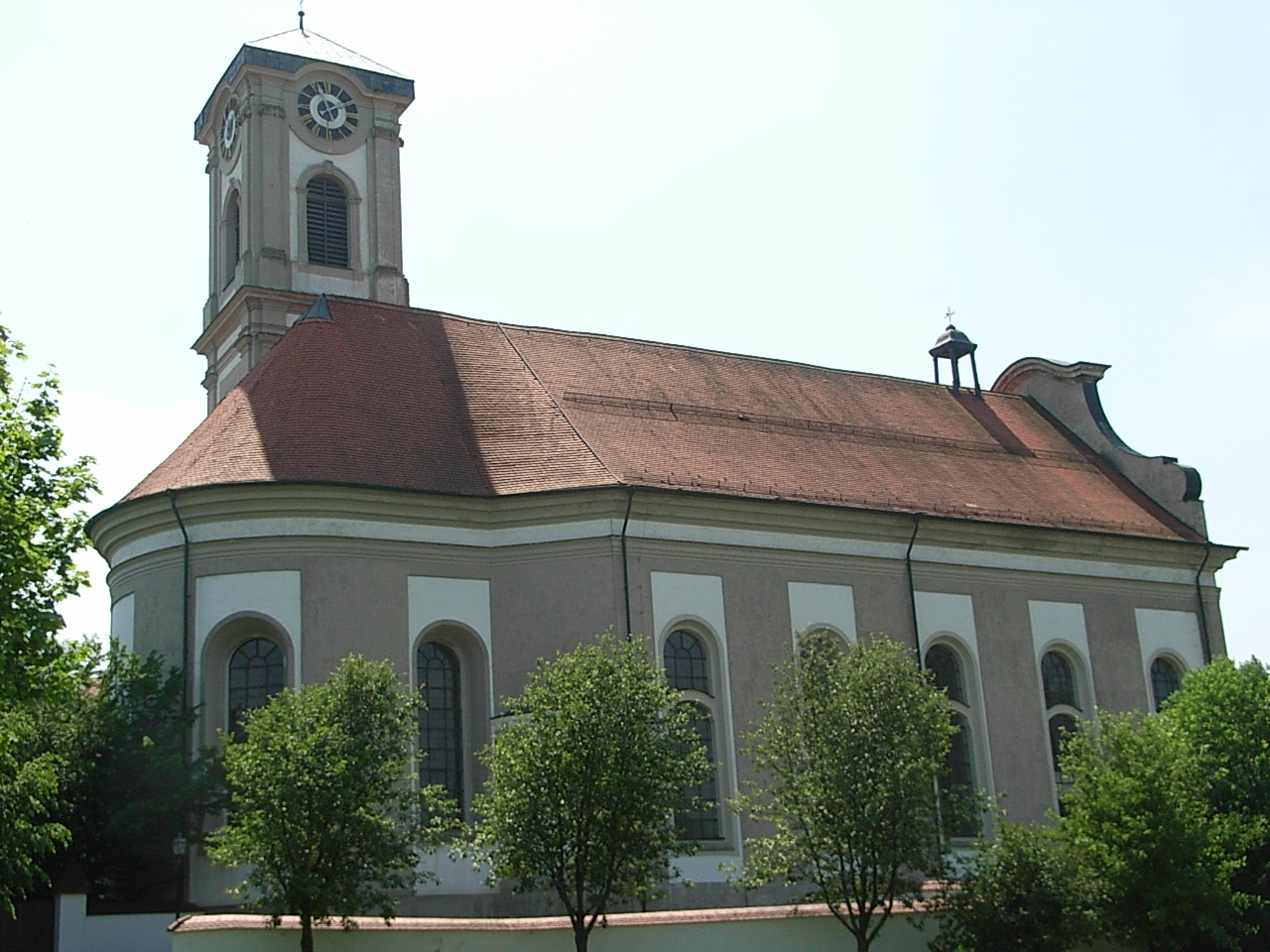
The Kloster Asbach, built between 1771 and 1780 on plans by François de Cuvilliés the Younger

François de Cuvilliés the Younger (French: [fʁɑ̃swa də kyvilje]; 24 October 1731 – 10 January 1777) was a German architect, engraver, draftsman, engineer, and author. He was the son of François de Cuvilliés (the Elder).

== Biography ==
He was born in Munich on 24 October 1731. Cuvilliés the Younger was trained by his father and later studied at the Académie royale d'architecture in Paris. In 1757 he got a job at the electoral court in Munich, around 1765 he was promoted to Captain of Engineers. He was in the service of his father until, after his death in 1768, he became second chief master builder behind Karl Albert von Lespilliez. His works lead from late Rococo to early Classicism, following the October 1770 mandate of Maximilian III Joseph, Elector of Bavaria, whereby he practically forbade Rococo as a "ridiculous" ornament for country churches and called for a "noble simplicity".

Cuvilliés the Younger continued to publish ornamental prints based on the works of his father. His incomplete textbook Vitruve bavarois, named after a textbook by the Roman architect Vitruvius, was a model for various artists of different disciplines.

== Works ==
- 1769: Alte Hauptwache at Marienplatz (Thomass-Eck) in Munich
- 1771–1777: Pfarrkirche Zell an der Pram
- 1771–1780: Abbey church of Kloster Asbach
- 1774: Neues Landschaftsgebäude in Munich

== Gallery ==
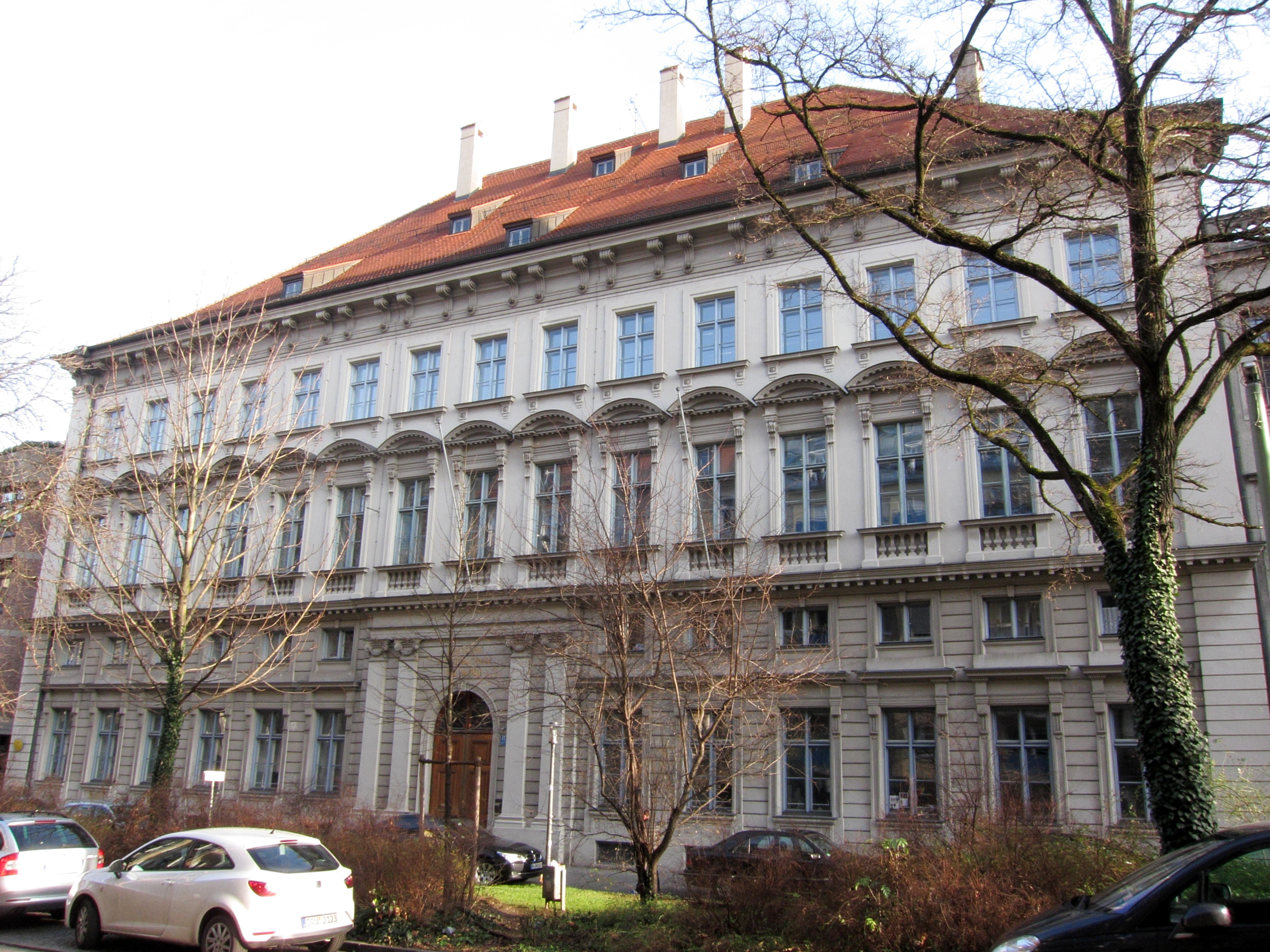
Neues Landschaftsgebäude, Munich

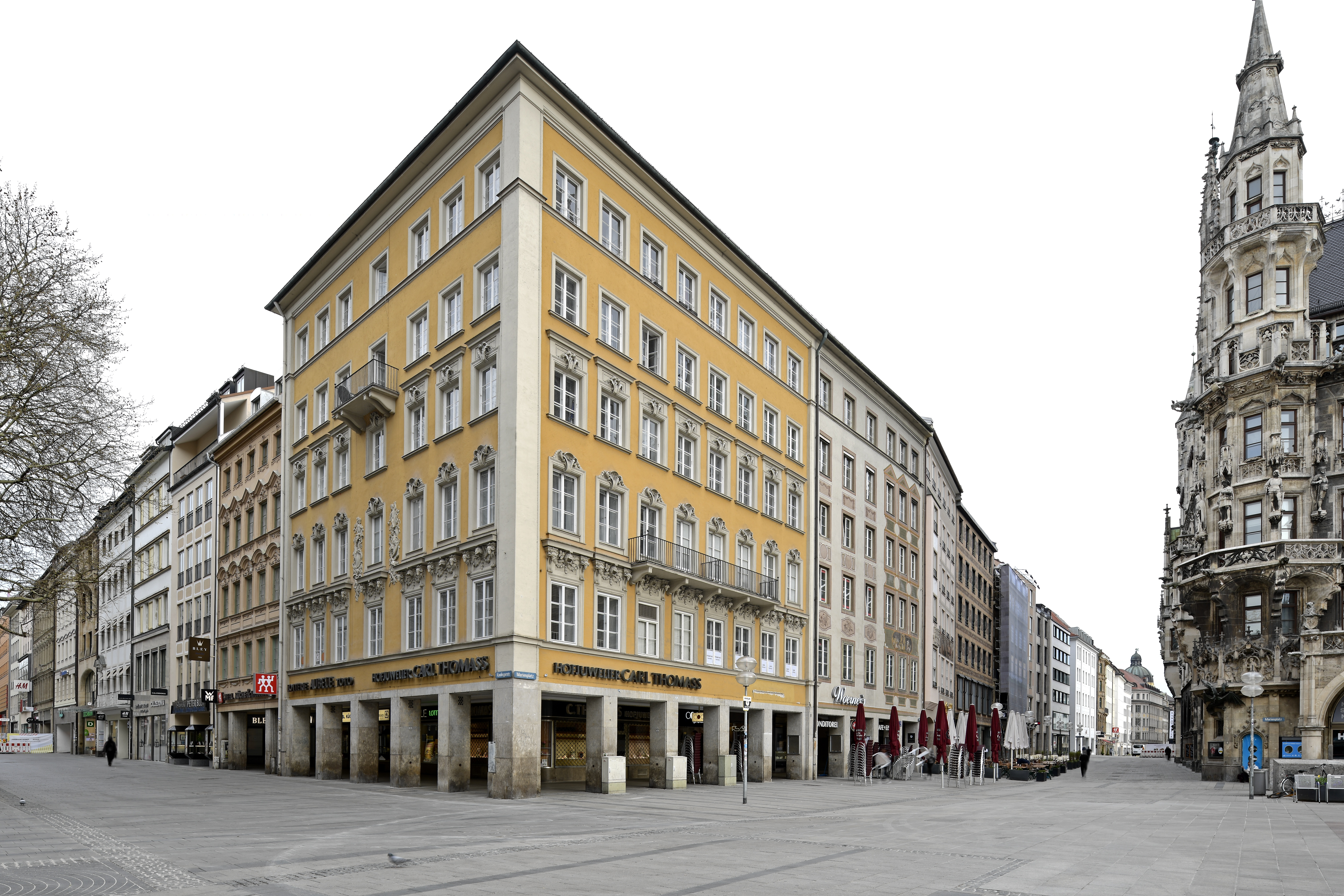
Thomass-Eck, Munich

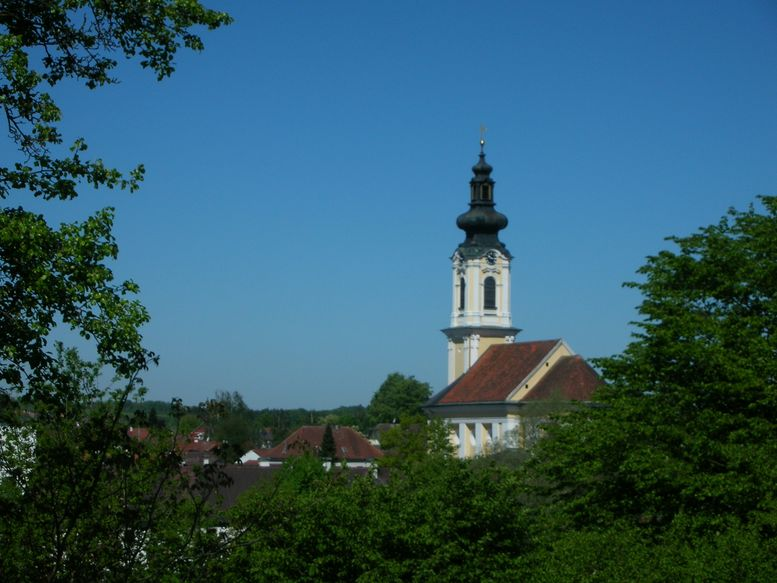
Pfarrkirche Zell an der Pram, Zell an der Pram, Schärding, Upper Austria

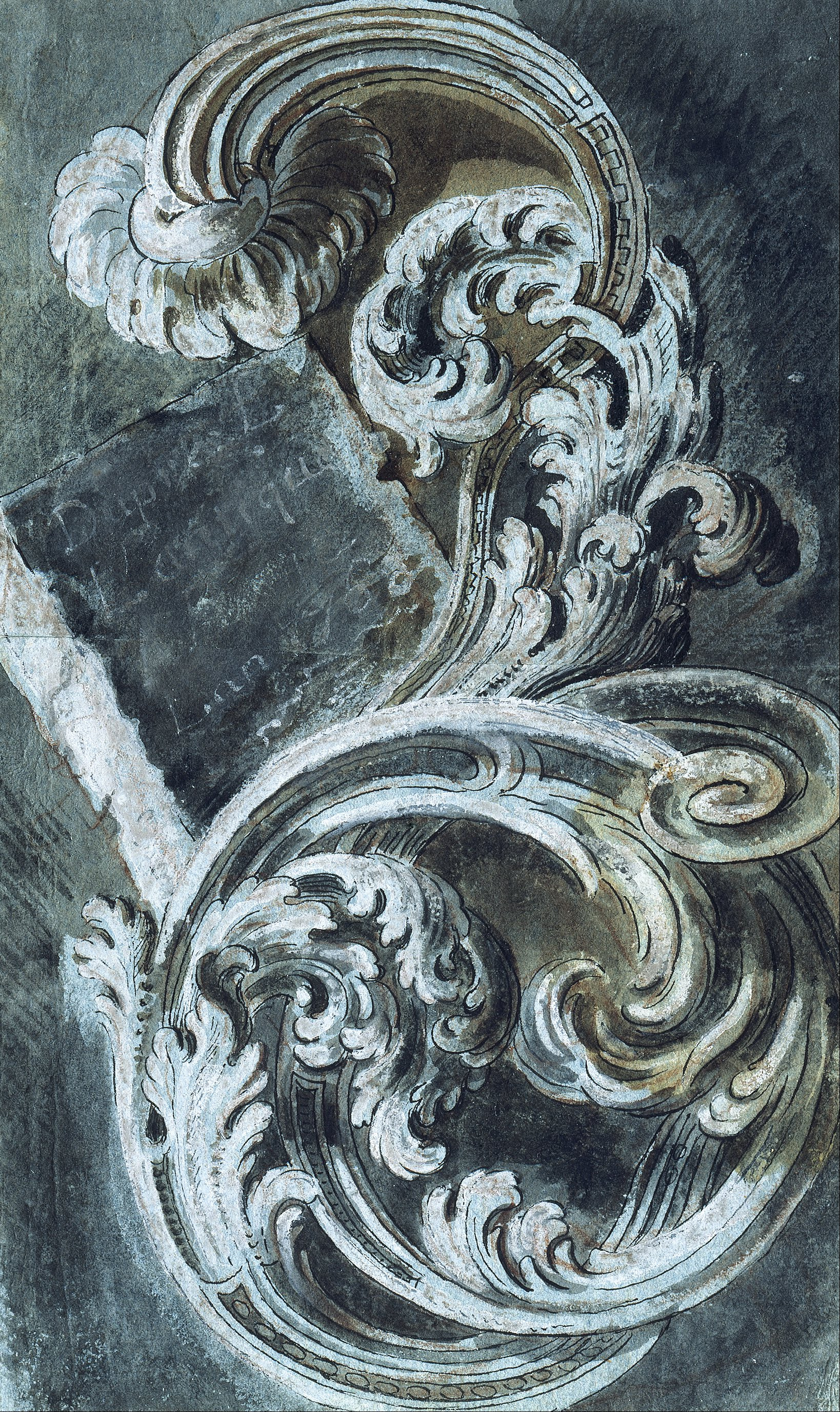
Inscription Plate in Scroll Ornament, ink over red chalk on blue paper, c. 1768, Museum Kunstpalast

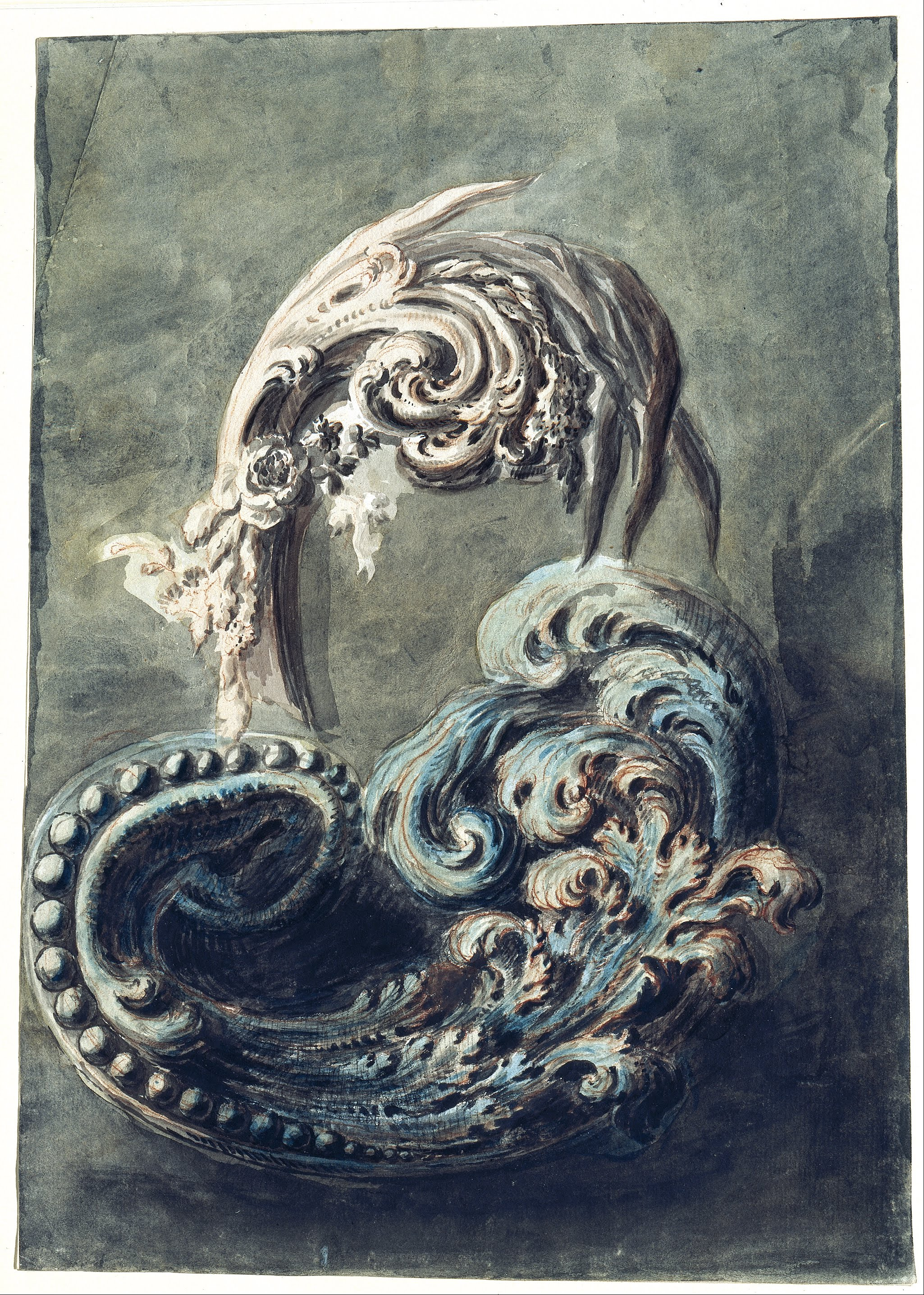
Scroll Ornament, watercolor over red chalk, 1768, Museum Kunstpalast

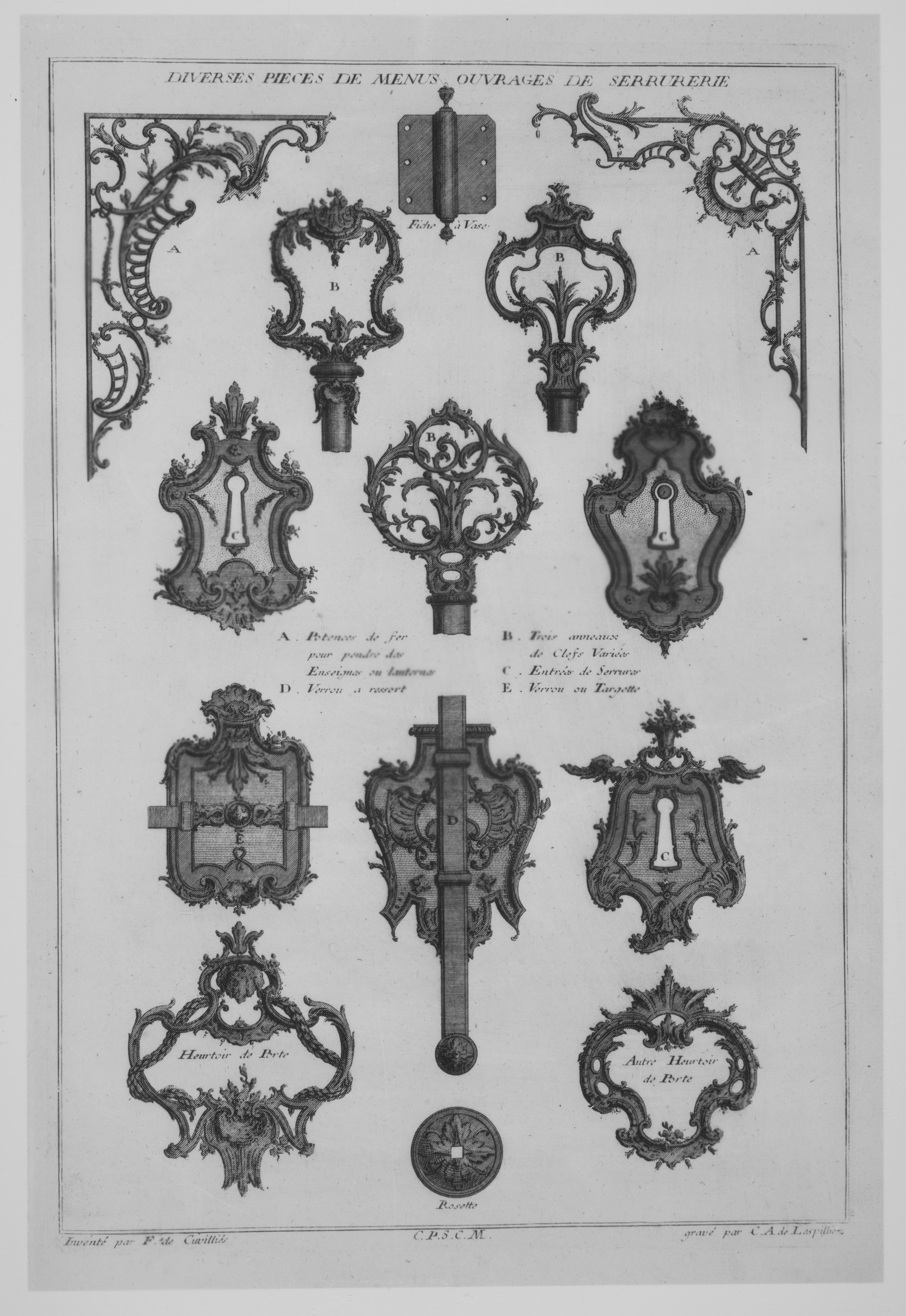
Morceaux de Caprice, engraving, 1745–56, Metropolitan Museum of Art

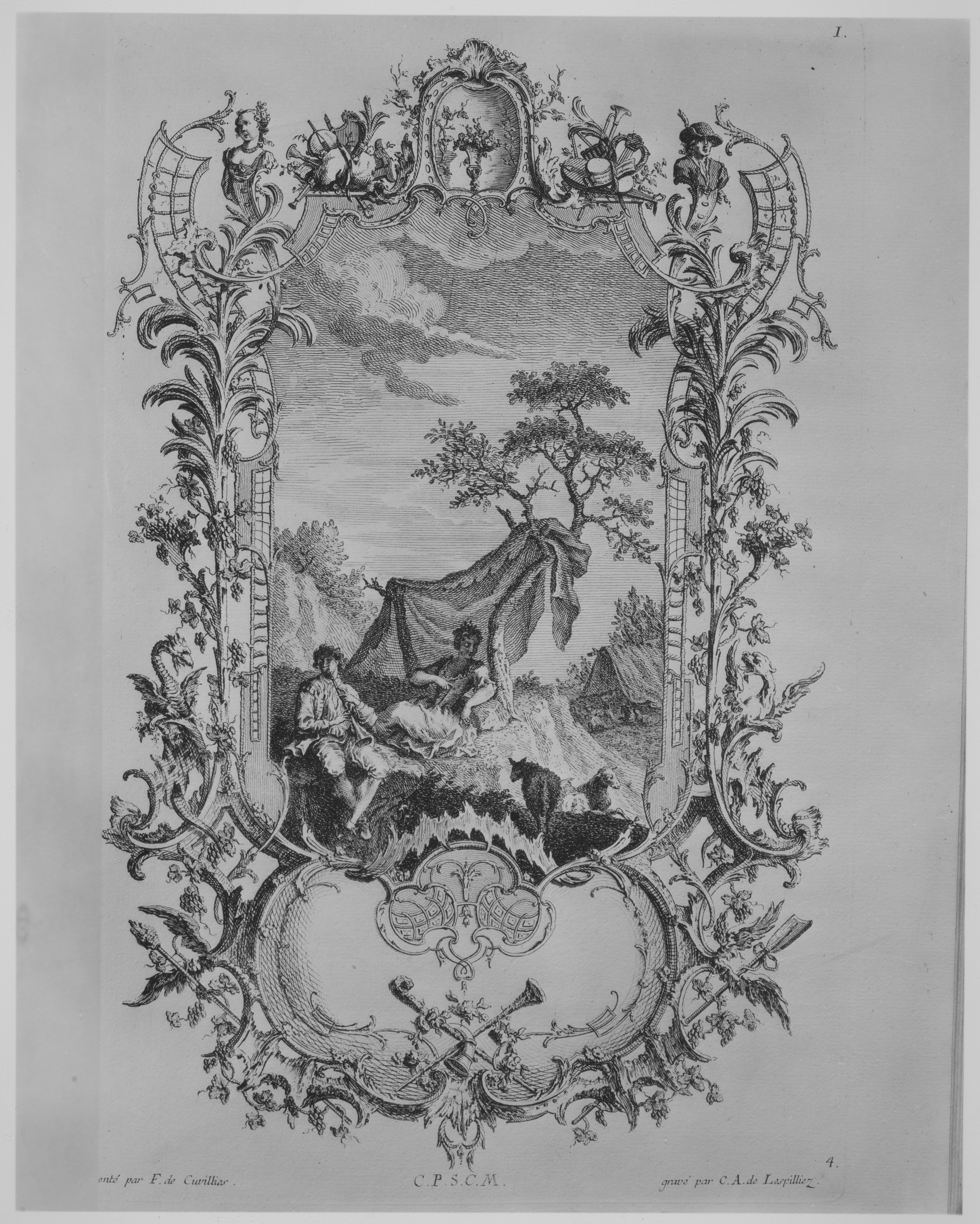
Morceaux de Caprice, engraving, 1745–56, Metropolitan Museum of Art

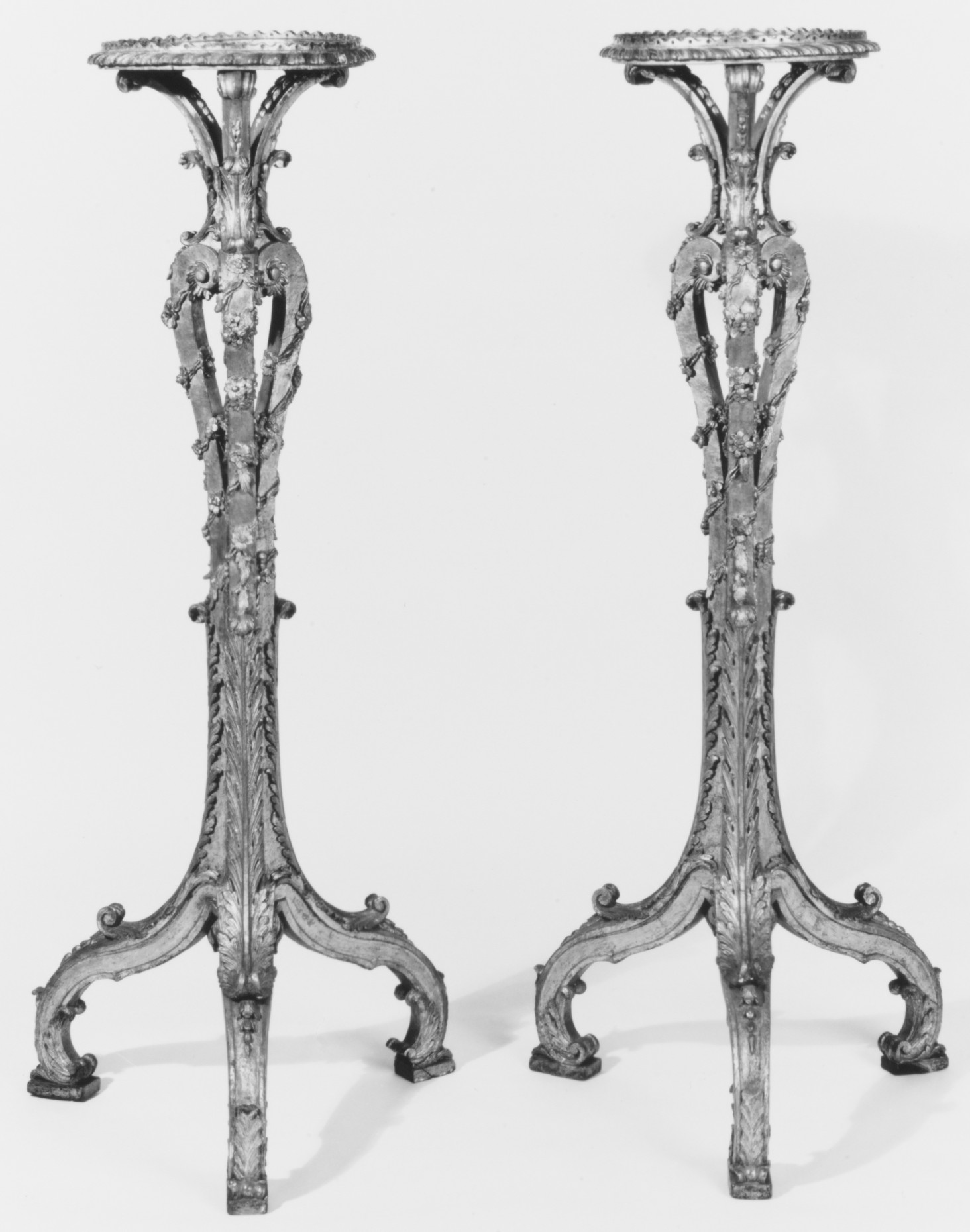
Pair of tripod candlestands, c. 1740, Metropolitan Museum of Art
