= Calden =

- Municipality
- Coat of arms

- Location of Calden within Kassel district
- Interactive map of Calden
- Location within Germany Location within Hesse
- Coordinates: 51°25′N 09°24′E
- Country: Germany
- State: Hesse
- Admin. region: Kassel
- District: Kassel
- Subdivisions: 6 districts

Government
  - Mayor (2020–26): Maik Mackewitz (Ind.)

Area
  - Total: 54.84 km^{2} (21.17 sq mi)
- Elevation: 200–239 m (656–784 ft)

Population (2025-12-31)
  - Total: 6,963
  - Density: 127.0/km^{2} (328.8/sq mi)
- Time zone: UTC+01:00 (CET)
  - Summer (DST): UTC+02:00 (CEST)
- Postal codes: 34377–34379
- Dialling codes: 05674, 05677
- Vehicle registration: KS
- Website: www.calden.de

Calden is a municipality in the district of Kassel in Hesse, Germany. It is located 12 km northwest of the city of Kassel, and the Kassel Airport is situated near Calden.

== Schloss Wilhelmsthal ==
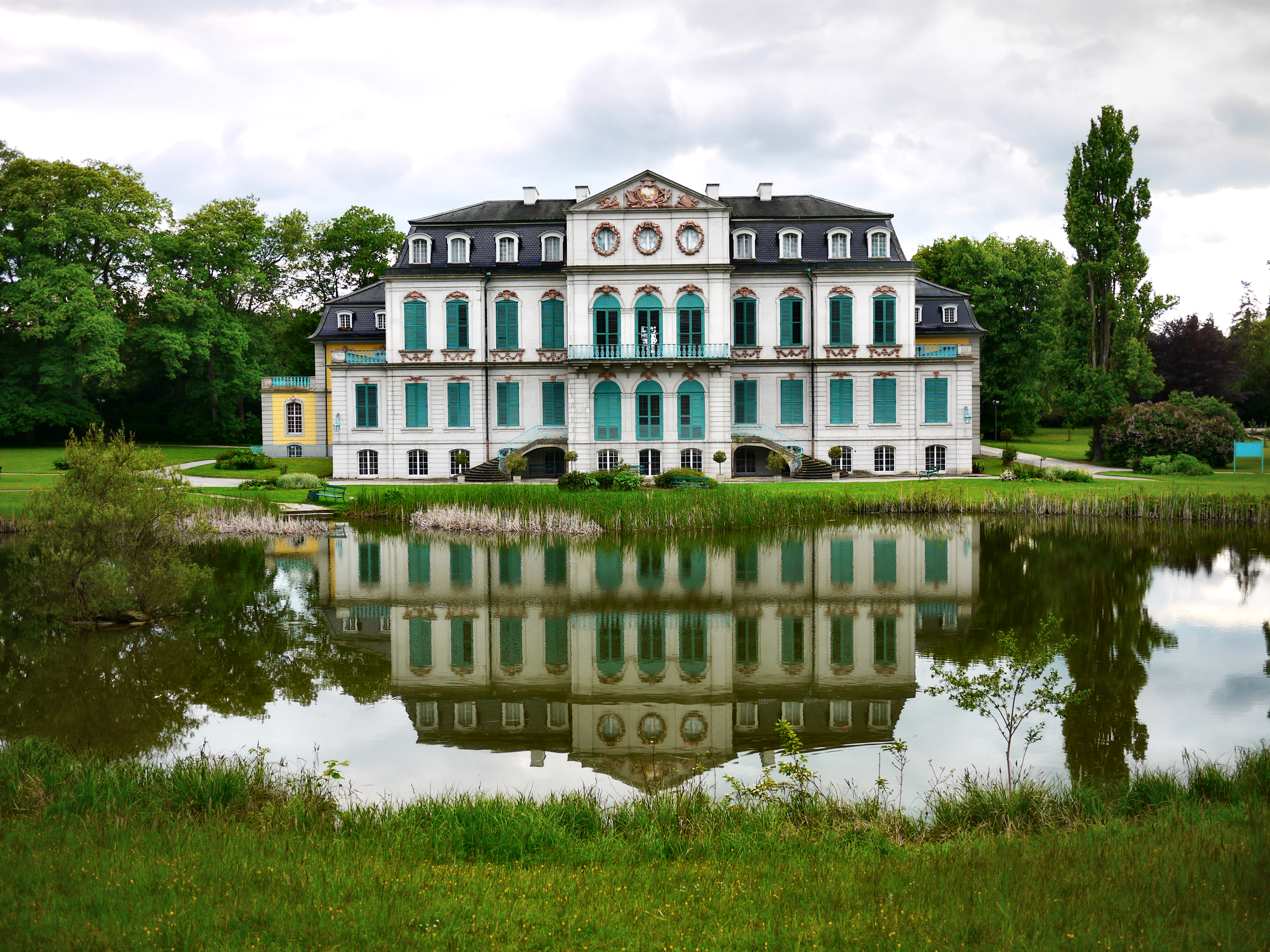
Schloss Wilhelmsthal

Schloss Wilhelmsthal is a Baroque château located to the south of Calden. It was built in the mid 18th century for William VIII, Landgrave of Hesse-Kassel according to plans by François de Cuvilliés.
