= François de Cuvilliés =

Bavarian decorative designer and architect

François de Cuvilliés, sometimes referred to as the Elder (French: [fʁɑ̃swa də kyvilje]; 23 October 1695, Soignies, Hainaut – 14 April 1768, Munich), was a Bavarian decorative designer and architect born in the Spanish Netherlands. He was instrumental in bringing the Rococo style to the Wittelsbach court at Munich and to Central Europe in general.

== Life and career ==
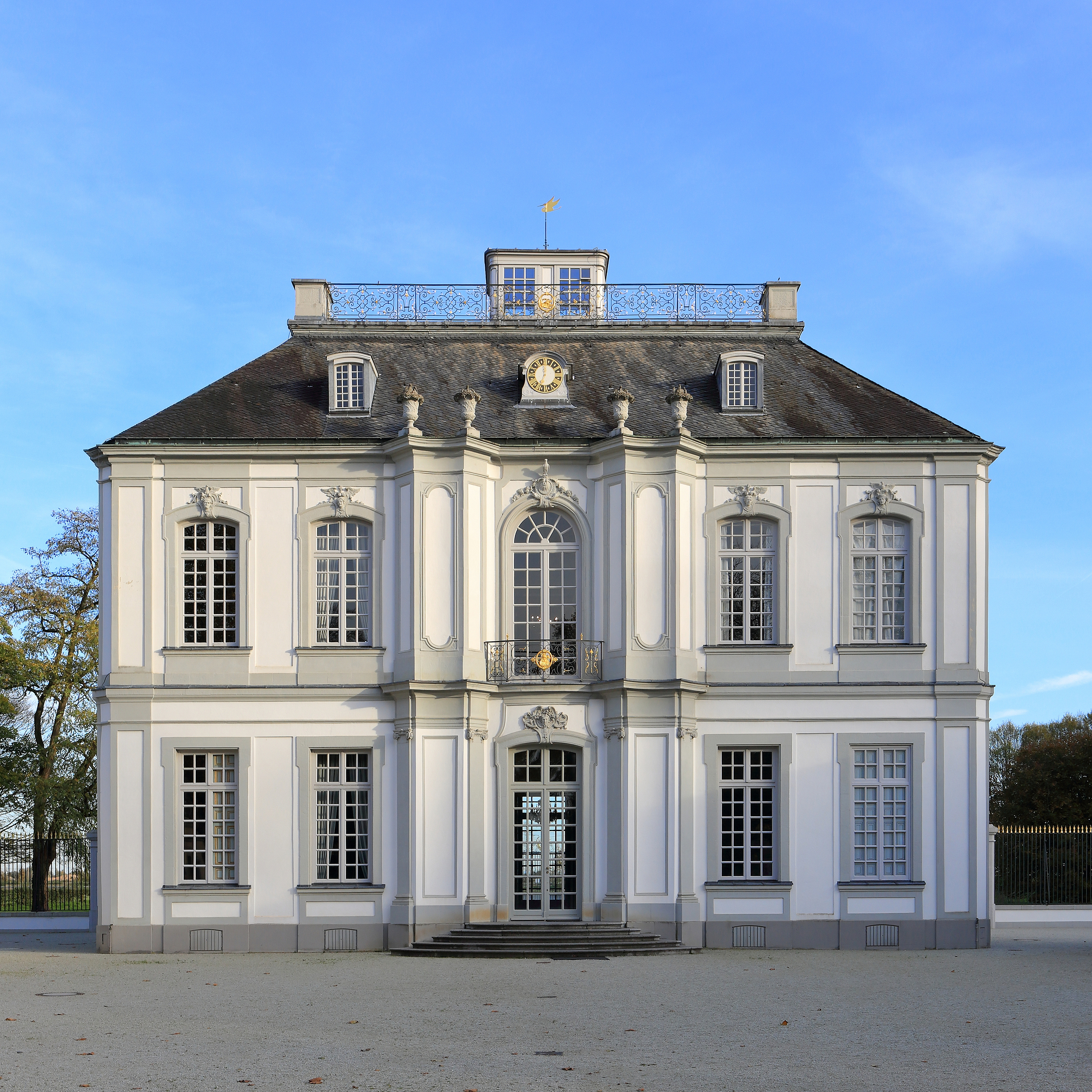
Falkenlust Hunting Lodge at Brühl

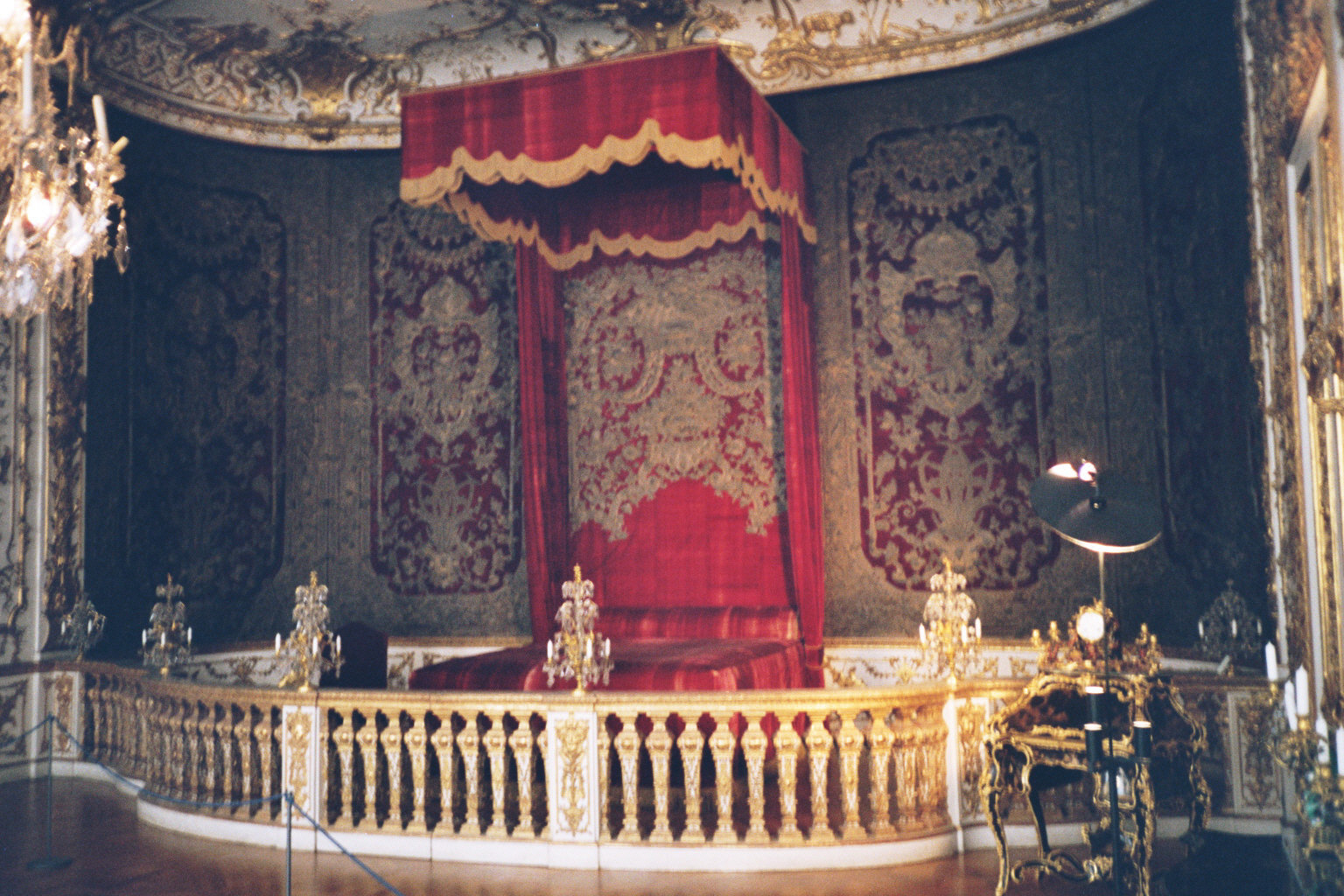
State bedroom of the Bavarian elector, Munich Residence

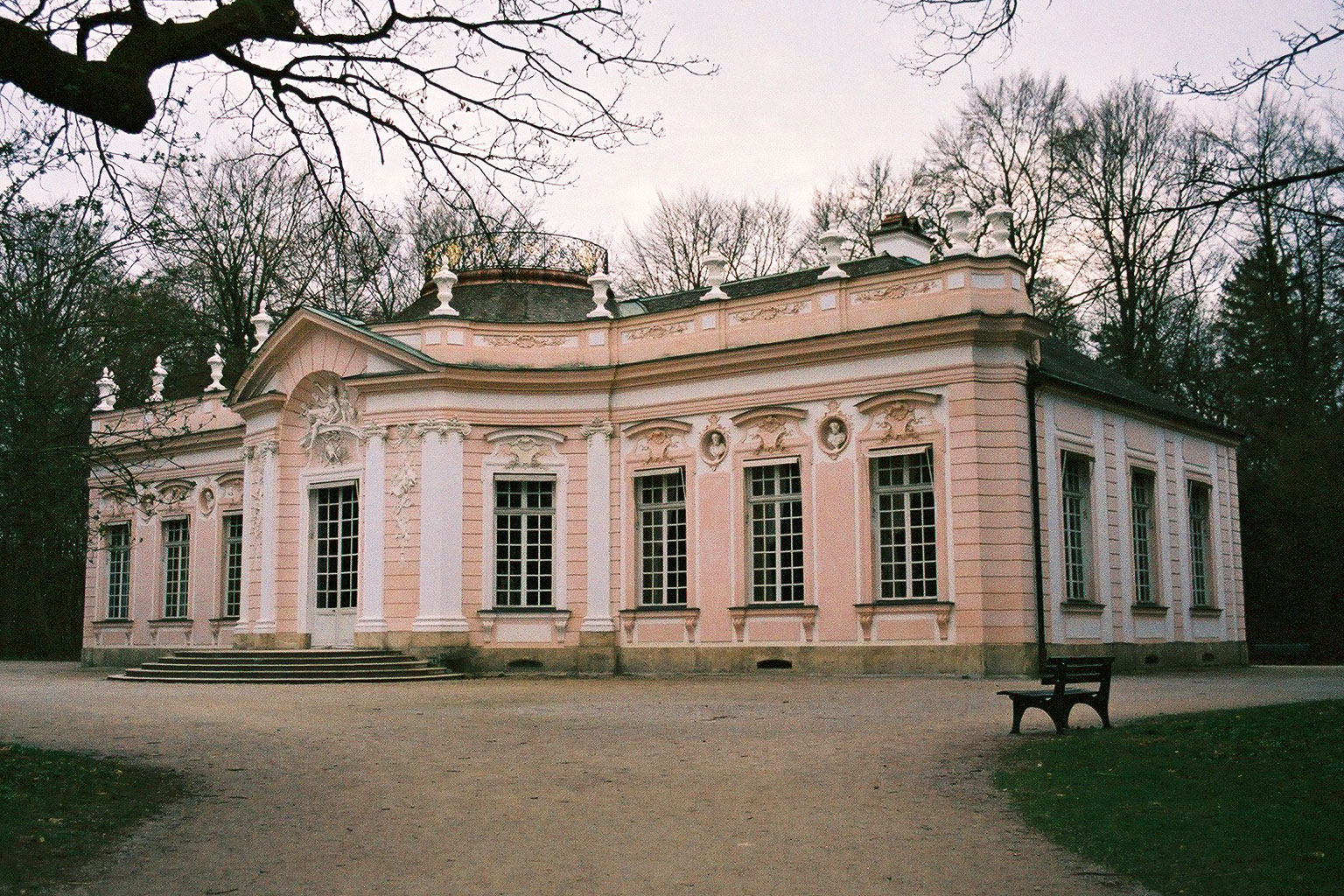
Amalienburg in the Nymphenburg Palace Park

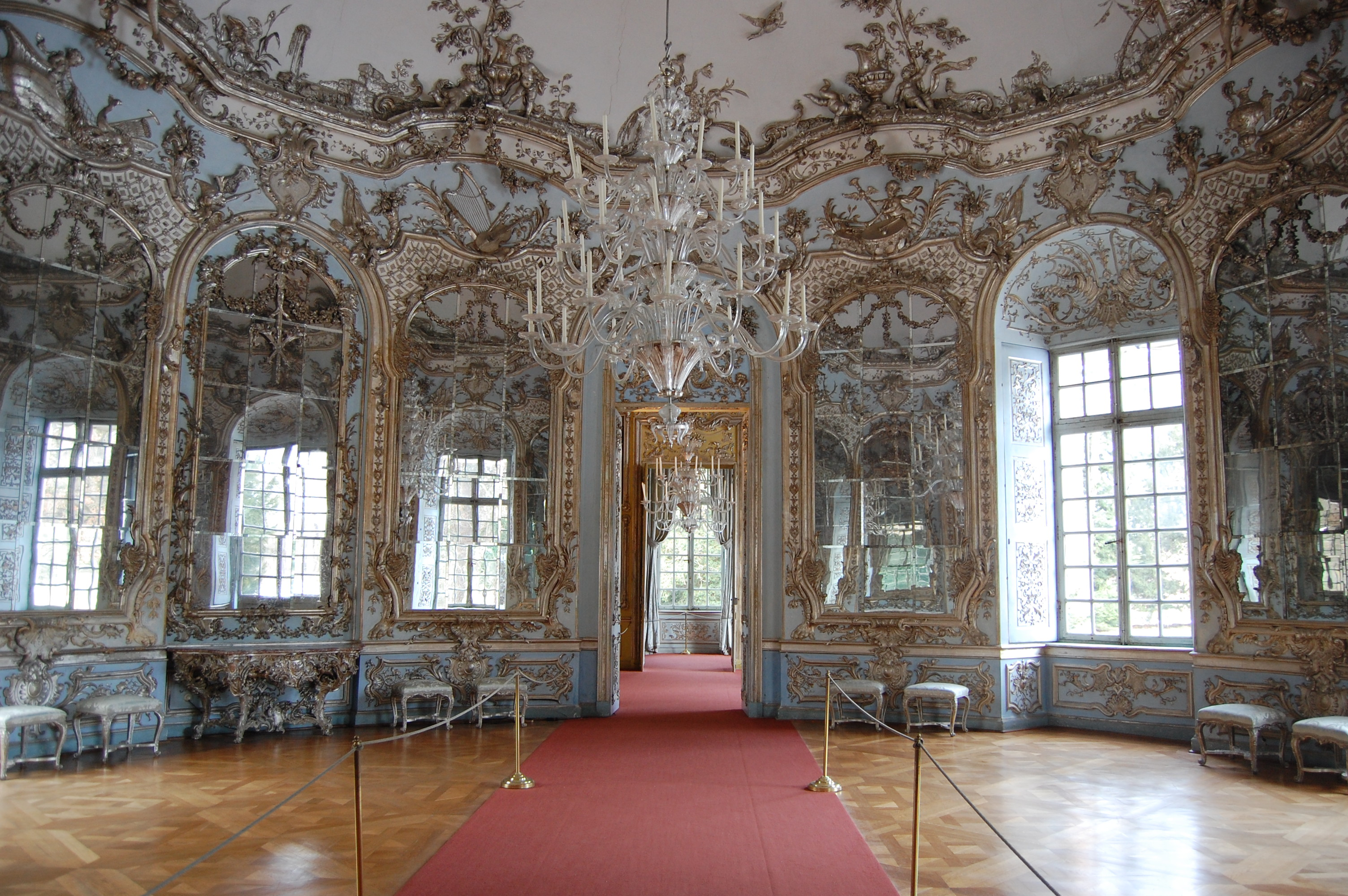
Hall of mirrors at Amalienburg

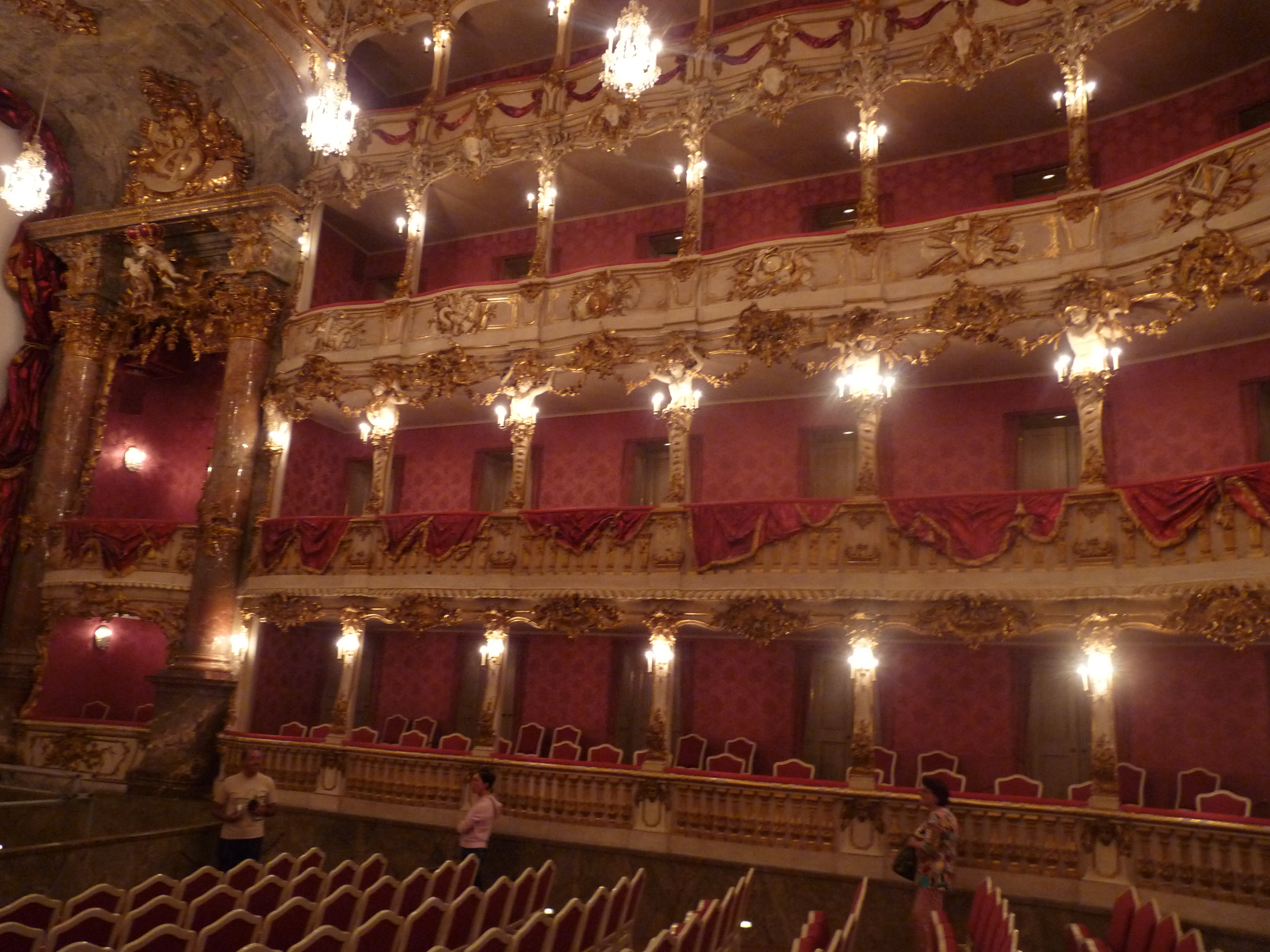
Interior of the Cuvilliés Theatre, Munich Residence

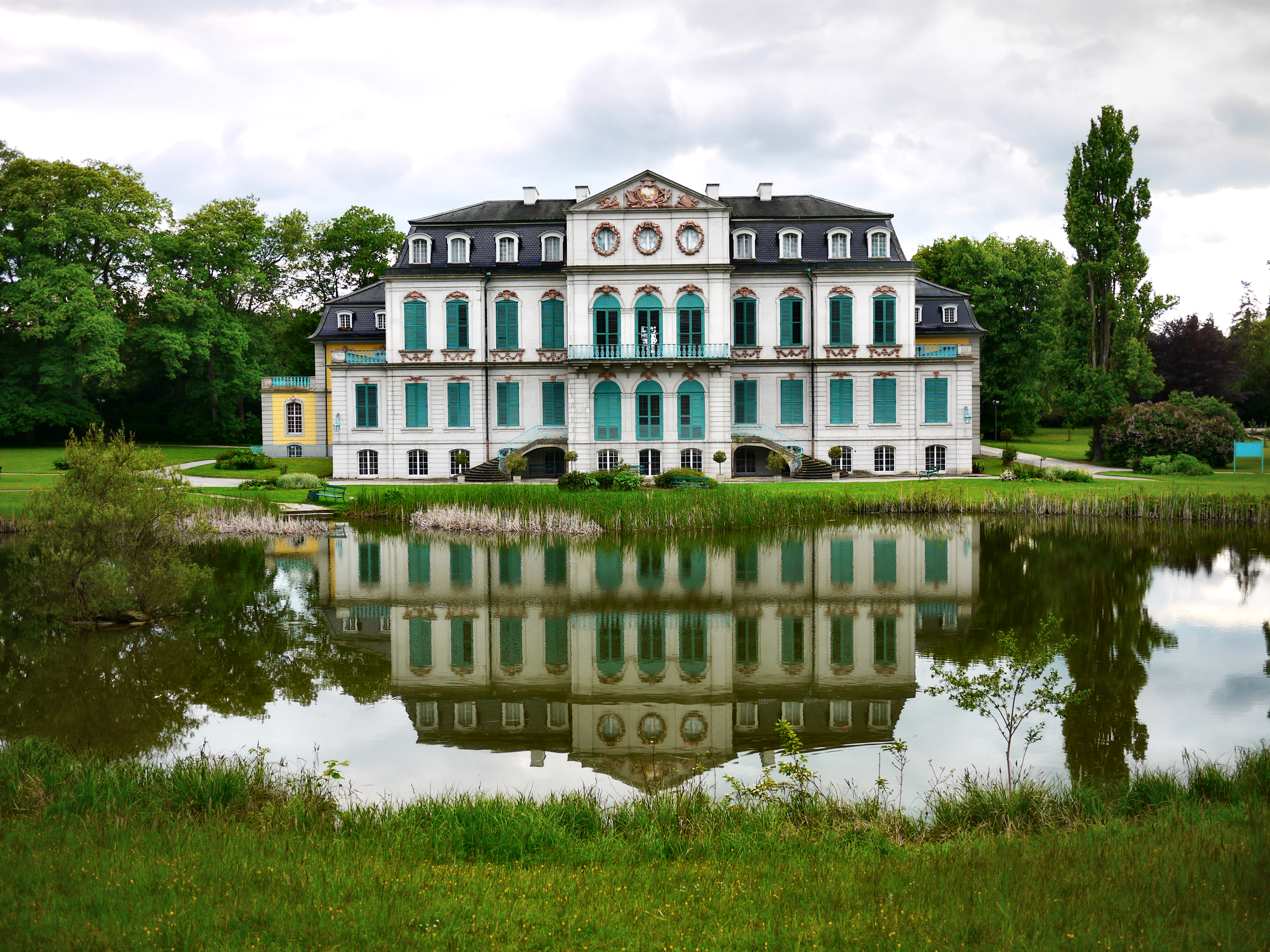
Schloss Wilhelmsthal in Calden

Cuvilliés was so diminutive in stature that it was as a court dwarf that he first came to the notice of the then-exiled Max Emanuel, Elector of Bavaria, who detected the young dwarf's aptitude and had him tutored in mathematics, then underwrote his further education with Joseph Effner and sent him to Paris from 1720 to 1724, where he trained in the atelier of Jean-François Blondel, On his return to Munich, he was appointed court architect, at first in conjunction with Effner.

At the Elector's death in 1726, for a time Cuvilliés worked at Schloss Brühl for the new Elector's brother, Clemens August of Bavaria. He provided designs for the chapel at Brūhl, (1730–40) and the hunting lodge Falkenlust (1729–40) but as Charles Albert's interests shifted to Munich, he also returned to Munich. There his fame was established by the decors of the Reiche Zimmer in the Munich Residenz, which had been damaged by a fire, 14 December 1729. The contents of the Schatzkammer fortunately had been spared, and Cuvilliés was commissioned to design the panelling of a new interior, to be executed by the court's premier carver Joachim Dietrich with four rococo gilded console tables on scrolling legs with playful dragons.

His masterpiece is the Amalienburg in the park at Nymphenburg, built 1734–39, with silvered or gilded naturalist Rococo decorations set off by coloured grounds. According to the Encyclopædia Britannica Eleventh Edition, "his style, while essentially thin, is often painfully elaborate and bizarre. He designed mirrors and consoles, balustrades for staircases, ceilings and fireplaces, and in furniture, beds and commodes especially".

The Residenztheater, or "Cuvilliés Theatre", (1751–1755) was designed and constructed for Elector Max III Joseph by Cuvilliées. Though the theatre was bombed during World War II, the carved and gilded boxes had been dismantled and stored for security. Afterwards, the Residenztheatre was meticulously recreated in the 1950s.

He wrote several treatises on artistic and decorative subjects, which were edited by his son, François de Cuvilliés the Younger, who succeeded his father at the court of Munich. From 1738 he embarked on his lifelong series of suites of engravings of wall-panelling, cornices, furniture and wrought-iron work, which were then published in Munich and distributed in Paris and doubtless elsewhere; they served to disseminate the Rococo throughout Europe.

== Chief works ==
- Augustusburg and Falkenlust Palaces, Brühl (World Heritage Site) (1728–1740)
- Palais Piosasque de Non in Munich (1729; destroyed) (de)
- Upgrading of the Munich Residence (1730–1737), including construction of the Cuvilliés Theatre (1750–1753)
- Palais Holnstein in Munich (1733–1737)
- Amalienburg in the park of Nymphenburg Palace (1734–1739)
- Schloss Haimhausen (1743–49)
- Schloss Wilhelmsthal in Calden near Kassel (1744)
- Façade of Theatine Church, Munich (1768)

== François de Cuvilliés the Younger ==
His son François de Cuvilliés the Younger (* 24 October 1731 in Munich; † 10 January 1777 there) was also an architect and an assistant to his father. After the death of the latter, he became a deputy master-builder to the Electoral court at Munich. His work at first was in his father's Rococo style, but later led to Neoclassicism.
