= Georgian Theatre, Stockton-on-Tees =

Theatre in Stockton-on-Tees, England

Georgian Theatre
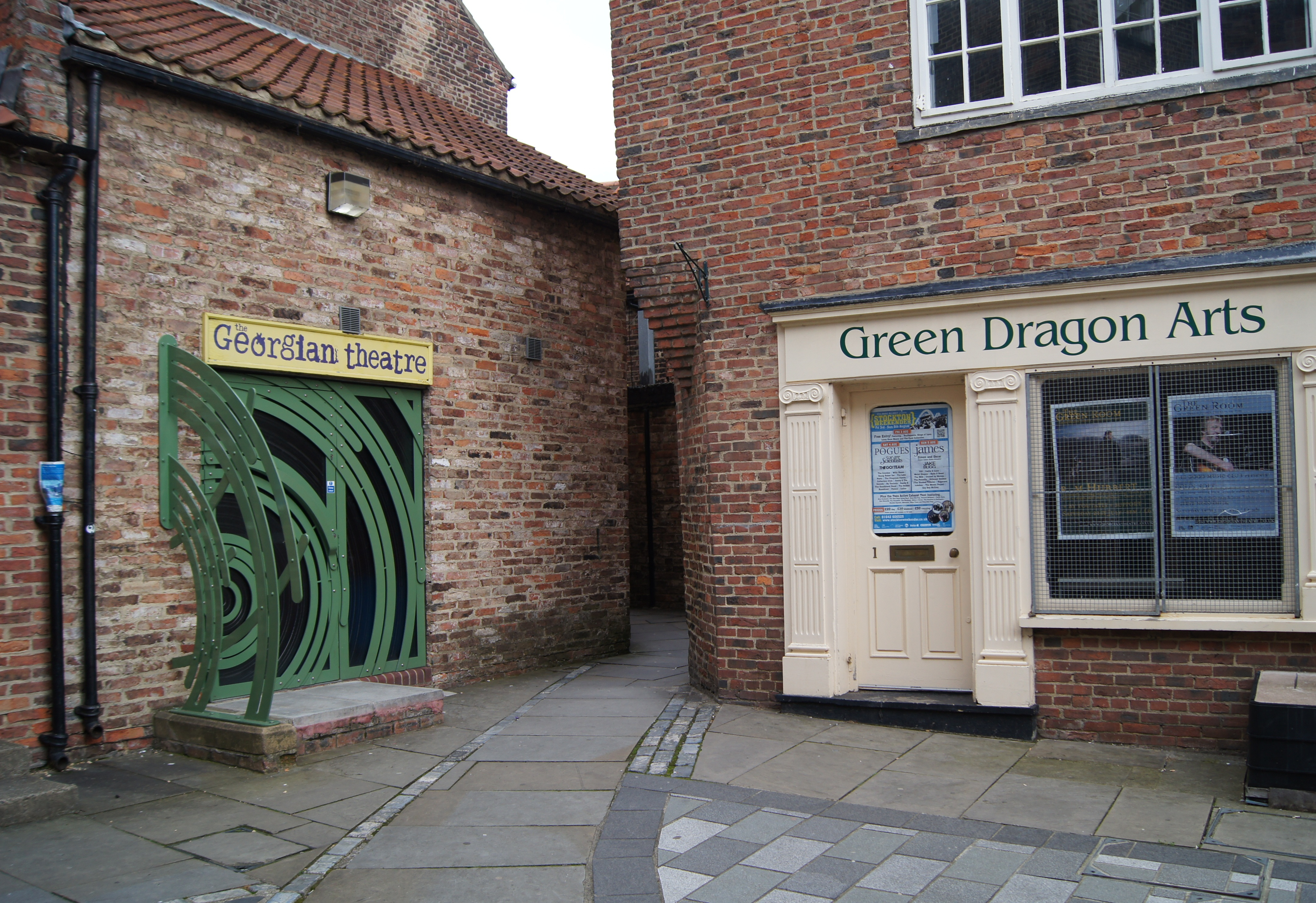
- Interactive map of Georgian Theatre
- Location: Stockton-on-Tees, England
- Coordinates: 54.5646°N 1.3118°W
- Capacity: 200
- Type: Theatre
- Designation: Grade II listed

Construction
- Opened: 1766
- Reopened: 2007

Website
- www.teesmusicalliance.org.uk/georgiantheatre

The Georgian Theatre is a Grade II listed theatre in Stockton-on-Tees, England and is one of the oldest Georgian provincial theatres in the country (cf Bath, Norwich and Wisbech). The oldest Georgian theatre in its original working form is the Theatre Royal in Richmond, Yorkshire.

The theatre has a capacity of 200 (standing) and is situated in the 'Cultural Quarter' of Stockton town centre, which is centred on Green Dragon Yard. It is gabled with pantiled roof and approached at the south end from a cobbled passage. There is a lean-to structure at the southern end, which is relatively modern. Adjoining is a cottage which was used as a drawing room, with actors entering the theatre through a door at the stage end of the east wall.

The Georgian Theatre is currently managed and programmed by the Tees Music Alliance, and typical entertainment includes live bands, jazz, folk and plays. The resident Tees Music Alliance features local artists heavily in its programme.

The studio opposite the theatre can be booked for recording and rehearsal sessions. The Tees Music Alliance also organises the Stockton Weekender: a large outdoor music festival taking place in the town each summer.

== History ==
Built as Stockton's tithe barn, the building was converted to a theatre, which opened in 1766 and began its new life as a touring house on the northern circuit, maintained by actors and stage managers. The theatre fell into disuse and disrepair some time during the 19th century, and became a sweet factory until the late 1950s. More decline followed, and the property was acquired by the local council in the 1960s, before a refurbishment saw it re-opened as a community building in 1980. The building underwent a range of uses, operating more as an historic building than working venue, until 1993 when it was handed over to the Stockton Music & Arts Collective (part of the Tees Music Alliance since 2006).

A programme of capital works saw the theatre receive a much needed and long overdue makeover in 2007. Crumbling internal walls were given a new, clean finish, new toilets and dressing rooms were constructed, an efficient heating system was installed and a bright new bar area was created. The following year, the exterior of the venue, along with its neighbour Green Dragon Studios, underwent improvements to lighting and signage. The wider Green Dragon Yard and Theatre Yard areas also underwent environmental improvements, leading to greater leisure use of the area.

Famous performers to have played at the venue include Arctic Monkeys, Sam Fender, Chrissie Hynde, Martha and the Vandellas, Mystery Jets, The Kooks, James Blunt, John Cooper Clarke, Duke Special, UK Subs, The Bluetones, The Cribs, Glasvegas, Self Esteem, Shaun Ryder, Clint Boon, Big Country, Athlete, Sleeper, Jack Peñate, Sea Power, John Shuttleworth, Daisy Chainsaw, Skids, The Maccabees, The Charlatans, The Chapman Family, Inspiral Carpets, The Wedding Present, English Teacher and Altered Images.

== Image Gallery ==
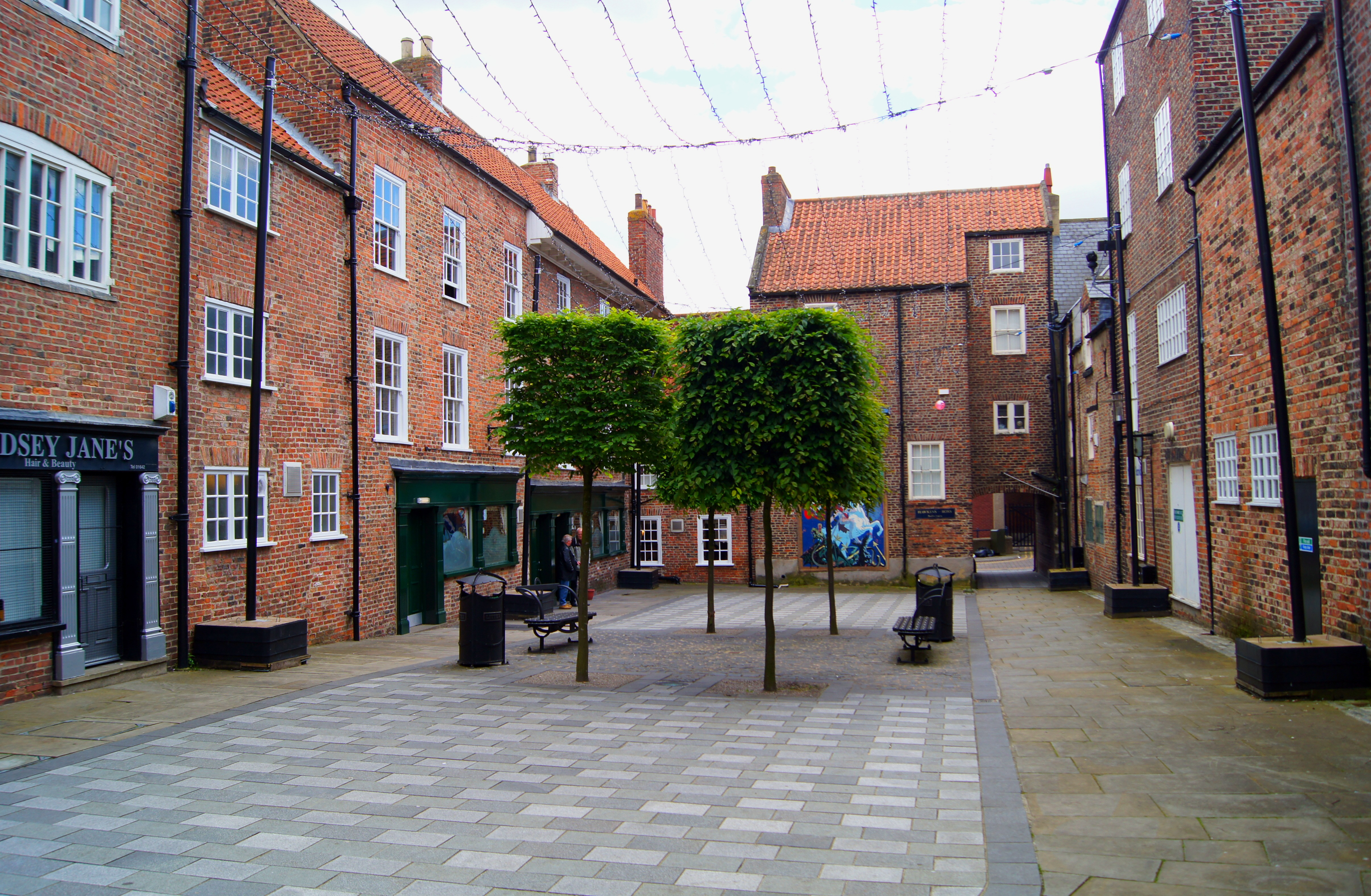
Green Dragon Yard

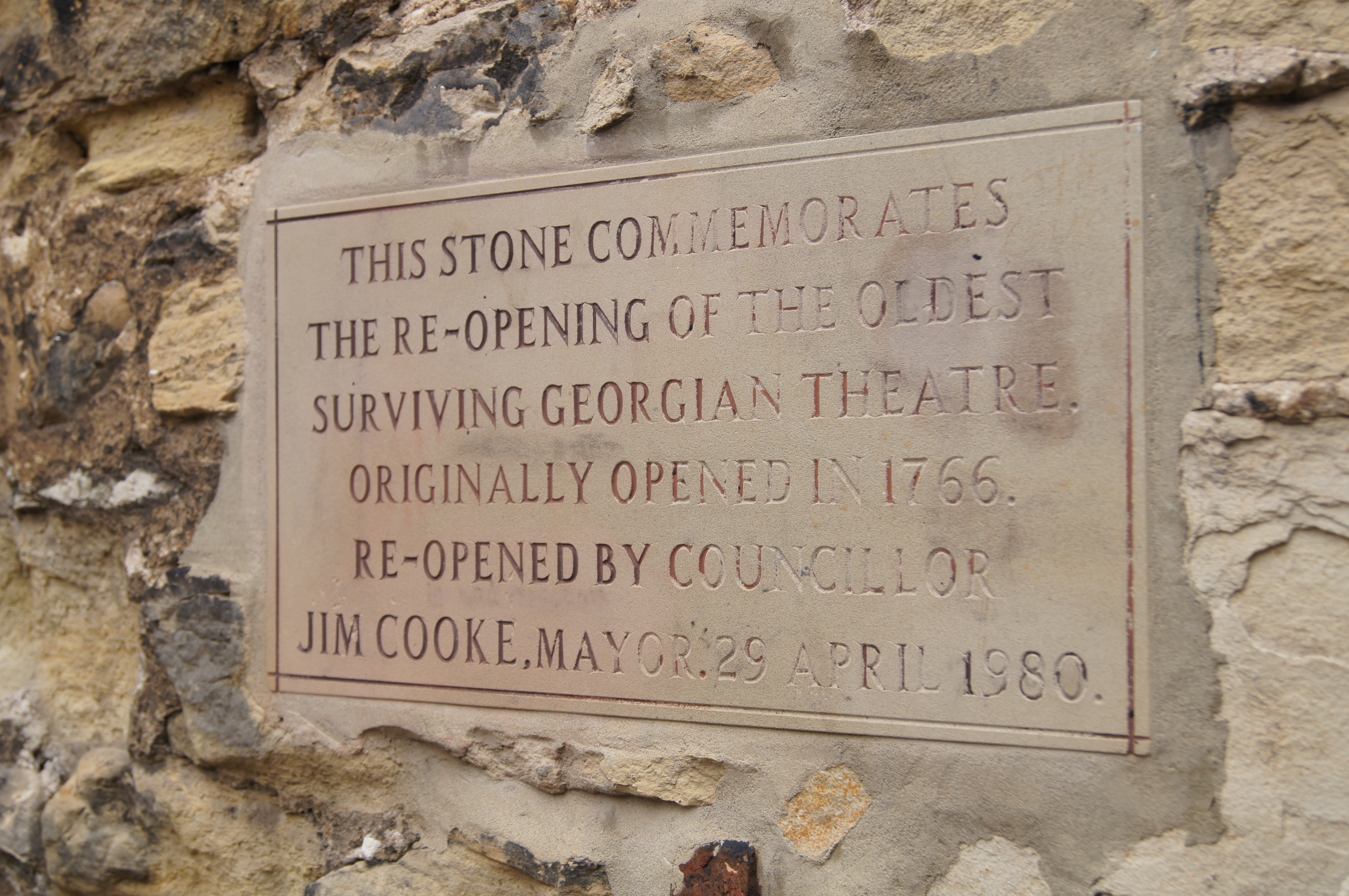
Georgian Theatre Commemorative Stone

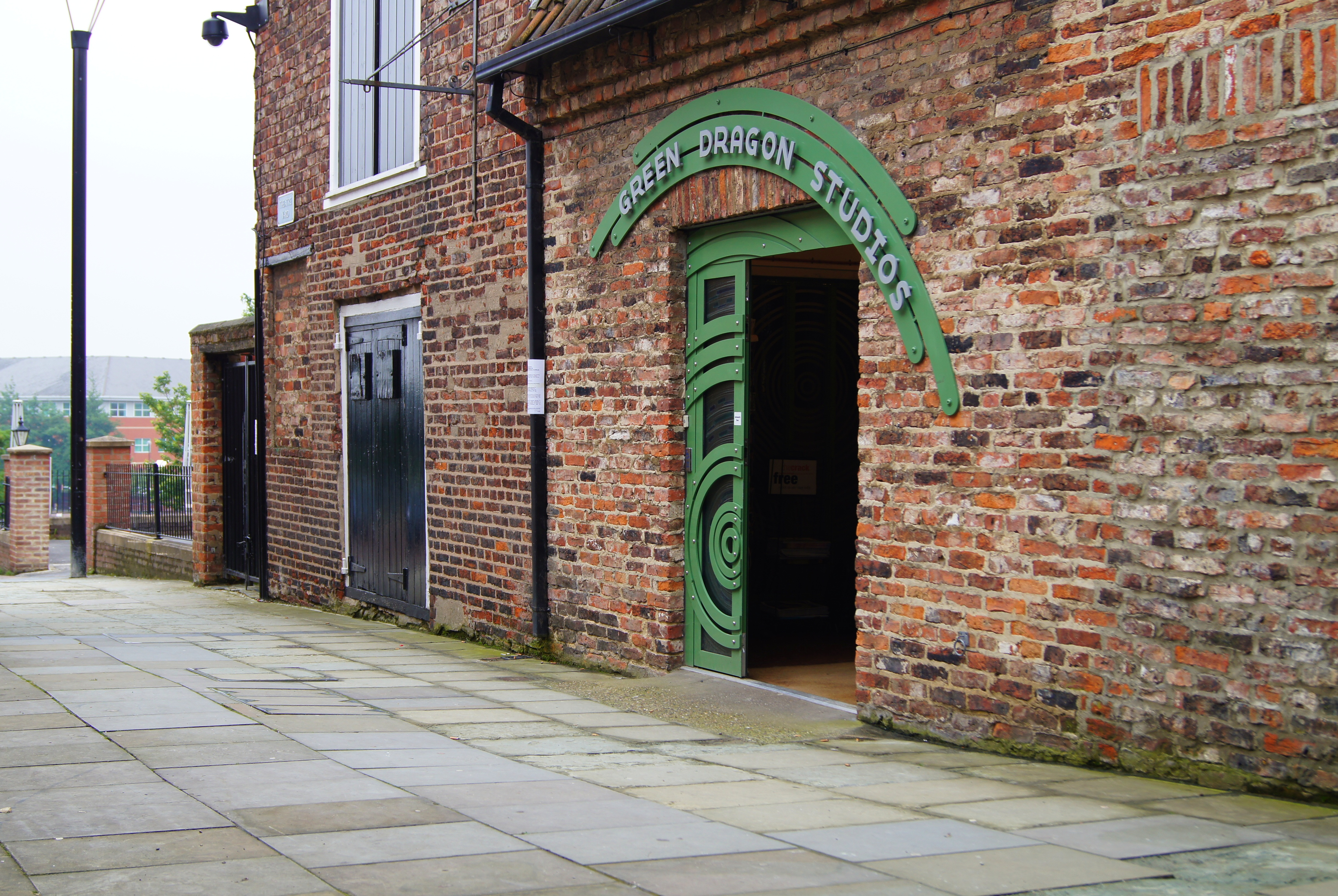
Green Dragon Studios
