= Carl Albert von Lespilliez =

German draftsman, architect and printmaker

Carl Albert von Lespilliez (also known as Karl Albert von Lespilliez) (1723–1796) was a German draftsman, architect, and printmaker. He worked as an architect for the Bavarian court. His work is held in the collection of the Cooper-Hewitt, National Design Museum and the Metropolitan Museum of Art.
