= Hedvig Strömfelt =

Hedvig Strömfelt (Stockholm 11 October 1723 - Kersö), 22 May 1766), was a Swedish baroness and psalm writer. She occupied an important place in the Moravian Church Stockholm congregation in 18th-century Sweden. She composed the psalms number 46, 59 and 63 in Sions Sånger (Songs of Sion) of 1743, and likely 72, 78, 85, 86, 105 and 108 in Sions Nya Sånger (New Songs of Sion) of 1748.

== Life ==
Hedvig Strömfelt was the daughter of baron Otto Reinhold Strömfelt, president of Svea Hovrätt, and Anna Magdalena Taube af Odenkat. Her parents, previously followers of the pietism, became followers of the Moravian Church after a visit to Livonia in 1738. Upon their return, the home of the Strömfelt family became a haven for the Moravian Church in Stockholm and Sweden, were the Moravian faith was introduced by mission of Thore Odhelius, who was referred to as the Moravian court chaplain of her father. Many Moravians were given employment and refuge in the Strömfelt home. Hedvig Strömfelt also became a leading member of the Moravian congregation and with her sisters Ottiliana, Christina and Ulrika referred to as the Strömfelt Sisters, and they acted as missionaries and preachers in especially the upper class circles of the capital.

In 1759, when the Moravian congregation of Stockholm was inspected by the Moravian Johan Huffel from Courland, it was severely divided, and the Strömfelt Sisters, along with Olof Gren, Eric Alibin and the Schmidt couple were the leaders of the so-called Six Party. When the Moravian congregation was united by the preacher Ike, the Strömfelt Sisters refused to join.

The writings of Hedvig Strömfelt are inspired by ta strong erotic mysticism around blood and wounds which were popular within the Moravian Church at the time. Alongside her sister Ulrika, she also wrote a description of the history of the first Moravian church in Sweden.
