= 1780s =

Decade

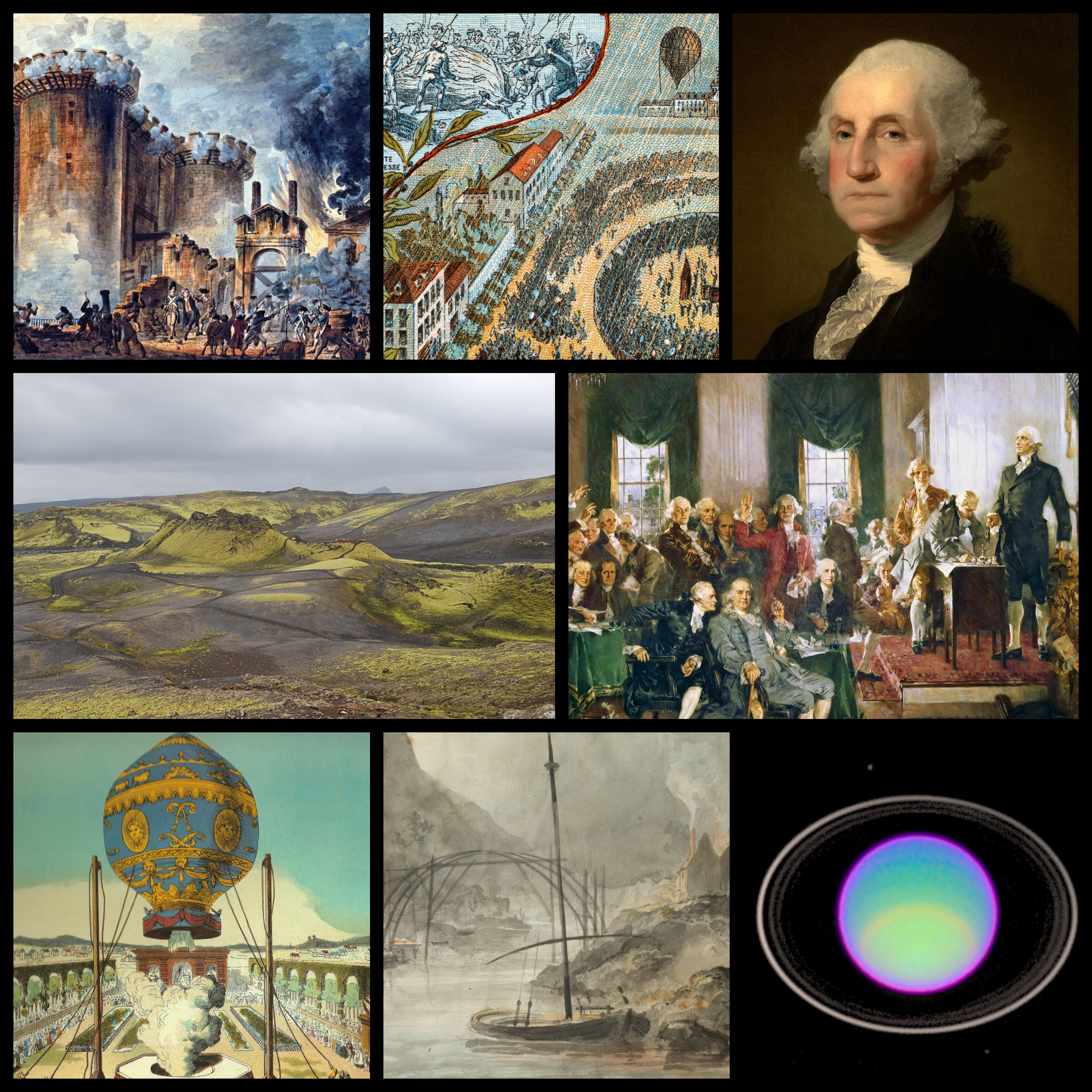
From top left, clockwise: The fall of the Bastille propelled the start of the French Revolutionary War, a war that will eventually influence global politics by the birth of democracy in governments, and conceive the idea of republicanism worldwide; The first hydrogen balloons flew successfully this decade by Jacques Charles and Nicolas-Louis Robert; George Washington becomes president of the United States of America. His ascension into office marked him as America's first president; The United States Constitution is signed in Philadelphia by delegates of the Constitutional Convention, beginning the document's ratification process; Uranus is discovered in 1781 by William Herschel, further expanding the global scientific consensuses and understanding on the Solar System, recognizing it as the seventh planet from the Sun; The Iron Bridge opens, making it the world's very first bridge made out of cast iron, ushering in the preliminary wave of the Industrial Revolution; The Montgolfier brothers manned the world's first hot-air balloon, which stayed afloat 2 kilometres above ground in its 1783 voyage; Icelandic volcano Laki erupted in 1783, unleashing an 8-month-long environmental destruction and widespread famine across Europe. Up to 33% of Iceland's population and tens of thousands more in Mainland Europe succumbed to the chain of disasters, leading the eruption to be dubbed as "one of the worst" in contemporary history.

The 1780s (pronounced "seventeen-eighties") was a decade of the Gregorian calendar that began on January 1, 1780, and ended on December 31, 1789. A period widely considered as transitional between the Age of Enlightenment and the Industrial Revolution, the 1780s saw the inception of modern philosophy. With the rise of astronomical, technological, and political discoveries and innovations such as Uranus, cast iron on structures, republicanism and hot-air balloons, the 1780s kick-started a rapid global industrialization movement, leaving behind the world's predominantly agrarian customs in the past. The last surviving person born in the 1780s, Geert Adriaans Boomgaard, died on 3 February 1899.

== Events ==
=== 1780 ===
==== January–March ====
- January 16 – American Revolutionary War – Battle of Cape St. Vincent: British Admiral Sir George Rodney defeats a Spanish fleet.
- February 19 – The legislature of New York votes to allow its delegates to cede a portion of its western territory to the Continental Congress for the common benefit of the war.
- March 1 – The legislature of Pennsylvania votes, 34 to 21, to approve An Act for the Gradual Abolition of Slavery.
- March 11
  - The First League of Armed Neutrality is formed by Russia with Denmark and Sweden to try to prevent the British Royal Navy from searching neutral vessels for contraband (February 28 O.S.).
  - General Lafayette embarks on French frigate Hermione at Rochefort, arriving in Boston on April 28, carrying the news that he has secured French men and ships to reinforce the American side in the American Revolutionary War.
- March 17 – American Revolutionary War: The British San Juan Expedition sails from Jamaica under the command of Captains John Polson and Horatio Nelson to attack the Captaincy General of Guatemala (modern-day Nicaragua) in New Spain.
- March 26 – The British Gazette and Sunday Monitor, the first Sunday newspaper in Britain, begins publication.

==== April–June ====
- April 16 – The University of Münster in Münster, North Rhine-Westphalia, Germany is founded.
- April 29 – American Revolutionary War: The Spanish commander of the Fortress of the Immaculate Conception on the San Juan River in modern-day Nicaragua surrenders it to the British San Juan Expedition.
- May 4 – The first Epsom Derby horse race is run on Epsom Downs, Surrey, England. The victor is Diomed.
- May 12 – American Revolutionary War: Charleston, South Carolina is taken by British forces after 44 days of siege.
- May 13 – The Cumberland Compact is signed by American settlers, in the Cumberland Valley of Tennessee.
- May 19 – New England's Dark Day: An unaccountable darkness spreads over New England, regarded by some observers as a fulfillment of Bible prophecy.
- May 29 – American Revolutionary War – Waxhaw Massacre: Loyalist forces under Colonel Banastre Tarleton kill surrendering American soldiers.
- June 2 – An Anti-Catholic mob led by Lord George Gordon marches on the Parliament of Great Britain, leading to the outbreak of the Gordon Riots in London.
- June 7 – The Gordon Riots in London are ended by the intervention of troops. About 285 people are shot dead, with another 200 wounded and around 450 arrested.
- June 23 – American Revolutionary War – Battle of Springfield: The Continental Army defeats the British in New Jersey.

==== July–September ====
- July 11 – French soldiers arrive in Newport, Rhode Island to reinforce the colonists, in the American Revolutionary War.
- July 17 – The first bank created in the United States, the Bank of Pennsylvania, is chartered.
- August 9 – American Revolutionary War: Spanish admiral Luis de Córdova y Córdova captures a British convoy totalling 55 vessels amongst Indiamen, frigates and other cargo ships off Cape St. Vincent.
- August 16 – American Revolutionary War – Battle of Camden: British troops inflict heavy losses on a Patriot army at Camden, South Carolina.
- August 24 – King Louis XVI abolishes the use of torture in extracting confessions in French law courts.
- September 21 – Benedict Arnold gives detailed plans of West Point to Major John André. Three days later, André is captured, with papers revealing that Arnold was planning to surrender West Point to the British.
- September 25 – Benedict Arnold flees to British-held New York.
- September 29 – The Danish ship-of-the-line Printz Friderich runs aground on the Kobbergrund shoal and is a total loss

==== October–December ====
- October 2 – American Revolutionary War: In Tappan, New York, British spy John André is hanged by American forces.
- October 7 – American Revolutionary War: Battle of Kings Mountain: Patriot militia forces annihilate Loyalists under British Major Patrick Ferguson, at Kings Mountain, South Carolina.
- October 10–16 – The Great Hurricane flattens the islands of Barbados, Martinique and Sint Eustatius; 22,000 are killed.
- November 4 – Rebellion of Túpac Amaru II: In the Spanish Viceroyalty of Peru, Túpac Amaru II leads an uprising of Aymara and Quechua peoples and mestizo peasants as a protest against the Bourbon Reforms.
- November 28 – A lightning strike in Saint Petersburg begins a fire that burns 11,000 homes.
- November 29 – Maria Theresa of Austria dies in Vienna after 40 years of rule, and her Habsburg dominions pass to her ambitious son, Joseph II, who has already been Holy Roman Emperor since 1765.
- November 30 – American Revolutionary War: The British San Juan Expedition is forced to withdraw.
- December 14 – Alexander Hamilton marries Elizabeth Schuyler Hamilton
- December 16 – Emperor Kōkaku accedes to the throne of Japan.
- December 20 – The Fourth Anglo-Dutch War begins.

==== Date unknown ====
- Jose Gabriel Kunturkanki, businessman and landowner, proclaims himself Inca Túpac Amaru II.
- The Duke of Richmond calls, in the House of Lords of Great Britain, for manhood suffrage and annual parliaments, which are rejected.
- Jeremy Bentham's Introduction to Principles of Morals and Legislation, presenting his formulation of utilitarian ethics, is printed (but not published) in London.
- Nikephoros Theotokis starts introducing Edinoverie, an attempt to integrate the Old Believers into Russia's established church.
- The Woodford Reserve bourbon whiskey distillery begins operation in Kentucky.
- In Ireland, Lady Berry, who is sentenced to death for the murder of her son, is released when she agrees to become an executioner (she retires in 1810).
- The Jameson Irish Whiskey distillery is founded in Dublin, Ireland.
- The original Craven Cottage is built by William Craven, 6th Baron Craven, in London, on what will become the centre circle of Fulham F.C.'s pitch.
- The amateur dramatic group Det Dramatiske Selskab is founded in Christiania, Norway.
- Western countries pay 16,000,000 ounces of silver for Chinese goods.
- The Kingdom of Great Britain reaches c.9 million population.

=== 1781 ===
==== January–March ====
- January – William Pitt the Younger, later Prime Minister of Great Britain, enters Parliament, aged 21.
- January 1 – Industrial Revolution: The Iron Bridge opens across the River Severn in England.
- January 2 – Virginia passes a law ceding its western land claims, paving the way for Maryland to ratify the Articles of Confederation.
- January 5 – American Revolutionary War: Richmond, Virginia is burned by British naval forces, led by Benedict Arnold.
- January 6 – Battle of Jersey: British troops prevent the French from occupying Jersey in the Channel Islands.
- January 17 – American Revolutionary War – Battle of Cowpens: The American Continental Army, under Daniel Morgan, decisively defeats British forces in South Carolina.
- February 2 – The Articles of Confederation are ratified by Maryland, the 13th and final state to do so.
- February 3 – Fourth Anglo-Dutch War – Capture of Sint Eustatius: British forces take the Dutch Caribbean island of Sint Eustatius, with only a few shots fired. On November 26 it is retaken by Dutch-allied French forces.
- March – Riots break out in Socorro, Santander, and spread to other towns.
- March 1 – The United States Continental Congress implements the Articles of Confederation, forming its Perpetual Union as the United States in Congress Assembled.
- March 13 – Sir William Herschel discovers the planet Uranus. Originally he calls it Georgium Sidus (George's Star), in honour of King George III.
- March 15 – American Revolutionary War – Battle of Guilford Court House: American General Nathanael Greene loses to the British.
- March 16 – Wolfgang Amadeus Mozart arrives in Vienna after being fired by the Archbishop of Salzburg. He would stay there for the rest of his brief life.

==== April–June ====
- April 4 – American Revolutionary War: The Spanish capture the sloop-of-war HMS St Fermin off Málaga, Spain.
- April 6 – The rebellion by Túpac Amaru II, against the Spanish colonial government of Peru, is ended as Tupac, his wife and two of his sons are captured at Checacupe.
- April 10 – Future U.S. President Andrew Jackson, age 14, is slashed by a British officer's sword at his home near Waxhaw, North Carolina, after refusing to clean the officer's boots, an event that leaves physical and psychological scars.
- April 14 – The Continental Congress votes a resolution thanking U.S. Captain John Paul Jones for his services.
- April 18 – Future New York mayor James Duane, North Carolina representative William Sharpe and future Connecticut governor Oliver Wolcott deliver the first report to the U.S. Continental Congress about the national debt and report it to be 24,057,157 and 2/5 dollars.
- April 25 – American Revolutionary War: The Battle of Hobkirk's Hill takes place in Camden, South Carolina
- May 9 – General John Campbell, defender of the British colony of West Florida, surrenders the capital at Pensacola to Spanish forces commanded by Bernardo de Galvez.
- May 18 – A Spanish army sent from Lima puts down the Inca rebellions, and captures and savagely executes Túpac Amaru II.
- June 12 – Ohmiya (近江屋), as predecessor for Takeda, a major worldwide pharmaceutical brand, is founded in Doshomachi (道修町), Osaka, Japan.

==== July–September ====
- July 27 – French spy François Henri de la Motte is hanged and drawn before a large crowd at Tyburn, London in England for high treason.
- July 29 – American Revolution – Skirmish at the House in the Horseshoe: A Tory force under David Fanning attacks Phillip Alston's smaller force of Whigs, at Alston's home in Cumberland County, North Carolina (in present day Moore County, North Carolina). Alston's troops surrender, after Fanning's men attempt to ram the house with a cart of burning straw.
- August 30 – American Revolution: A French fleet under Comte de Grasse enters Chesapeake Bay, cutting British General Charles Cornwallis off from escape by sea.
- September 4 – Los Angeles is founded as El Pueblo de Nuestra Señora la Reina de Los Ángeles de Porciuncula ("City of Our Lady the Queen of the Angels of Porciuncula"), by a group of 44 Spanish settlers in California.
- September 5 – American Revolution – Battle of the Chesapeake: A British fleet under Thomas Graves arrives and fights de Grasse, but is unable to break through to relieve the Siege of Yorktown.
- September 6 – American Revolution – Battle of Groton Heights: A British force under Benedict Arnold attacks a fort in Groton, Connecticut, achieving a strategic victory.
- September 8 – American Revolution – Battle of Eutaw Springs, South Carolina: The war's last significant battle, in the Southern theatre, ends in a narrow British tactical victory.
- September 10 – American Revolution: Graves gives up trying to break through the now-reinforced French fleet and returns to New York, leaving Cornwallis to his fate.
- September 28 – American Revolution: American and French troops begin a siege of the British at Yorktown, Virginia.

==== October–December ====
- October 12 – The first bagpipes competition is held in the Masonic Arms, Falkirk, Scotland.
- October 19 – American Revolution: Following the Siege of Yorktown, General Charles Cornwallis surrenders to General George Washington at Yorktown, Virginia, ending the armed struggle of the American Revolution.
- October 20 – A Patent of Toleration, providing limited freedom of worship, is approved in the Habsburg monarchy.
- November 5 – John Hanson is elected President of the Continental Congress.
- November 29
  - English slave traders begin to throw approximately 142 slaves taken on in Accra overboard alive from the slave ship Zong in the Caribbean Sea to conserve supplies for the remainder; the Liverpool owners subsequently attempt to reclaim part of their value from insurers.
  - Henry Hurle officially founds the Ancient Order of Druids in London, England.
- December – A school is founded in Washington County, Pennsylvania that will later be known as Washington & Jefferson College.
- December 12 – American Revolutionary War – Second Battle of Ushant: The British Royal Navy, commanded by Rear Admiral Richard Kempenfelt in HMS Victory, decisively defeats the French fleet in the Bay of Biscay.

==== Date unknown ====
- Joseph II, Holy Roman Emperor abolishes serfdom.
- The Bank of North America is chartered by the Continental Congress.
- Charles Messier publishes the final catalog of Messier objects.
- Carl Wilhelm Scheele discovers tungsten.
- Immanuel Kant publishes his Critique of Pure Reason.
- Reverend Samuel Peters publishes his General History of Connecticut, using the term blue law for the first time.
- Phillips Exeter Academy is founded in New Hampshire.
- 'Journalisme' appears for the first time (in French).

=== 1782 ===
==== January–March ====
- January 7 – The first American commercial bank (Bank of North America) opens.
- January 15 – Superintendent of Finance Robert Morris goes before the United States Congress to recommend establishment of a national mint and decimal coinage.
- January 23 – The Laird of Johnstone (George Ludovic Houston) invites people to buy marked plots of land which, when built upon, form the planned town of Johnstone, Scotland, to provide employment for his thread and cotton mills.
- February 5 – The Spanish defeat British forces and capture Menorca.
- February 6 – Singu Min is overthrown as king of Myanmar by his cousin Phaungka Min and 8 days later will be executed by his uncle Bodawpayar.
- February 18 – Fourth Anglo-Dutch War: Shirley's Gold Coast expedition lands at Elmina on the Dutch Gold Coast. The British expedition fails to take the fort here but over the next several weeks seizes, with minimal resistance, four small Dutch forts.
- February 27 – The British House of Commons votes against further war in America, paving the way for the Second Rockingham ministry and the Peace of Paris.
- March 8 – Gnadenhutten massacre: In Ohio, 29 Native American men, 27 women, and 34 children are killed by colonial militiamen in retaliation for raids carried out by another Native American group.
- March 27 – Charles Watson-Wentworth, 2nd Marquess of Rockingham becomes Prime Minister of Great Britain.
- March 31 (Easter Sunday) – Mission San Buenaventura is founded in Las Californias, part of the Viceroyalty of New Spain.

==== April–June ====
- April 6 – Rama I overthrows King Taksin of Siam (now Thailand) in a coup d'état, and moves the political capital from Thonburi, across the Chao Phraya River to Rattanakosin Island, the historic center of Bangkok.

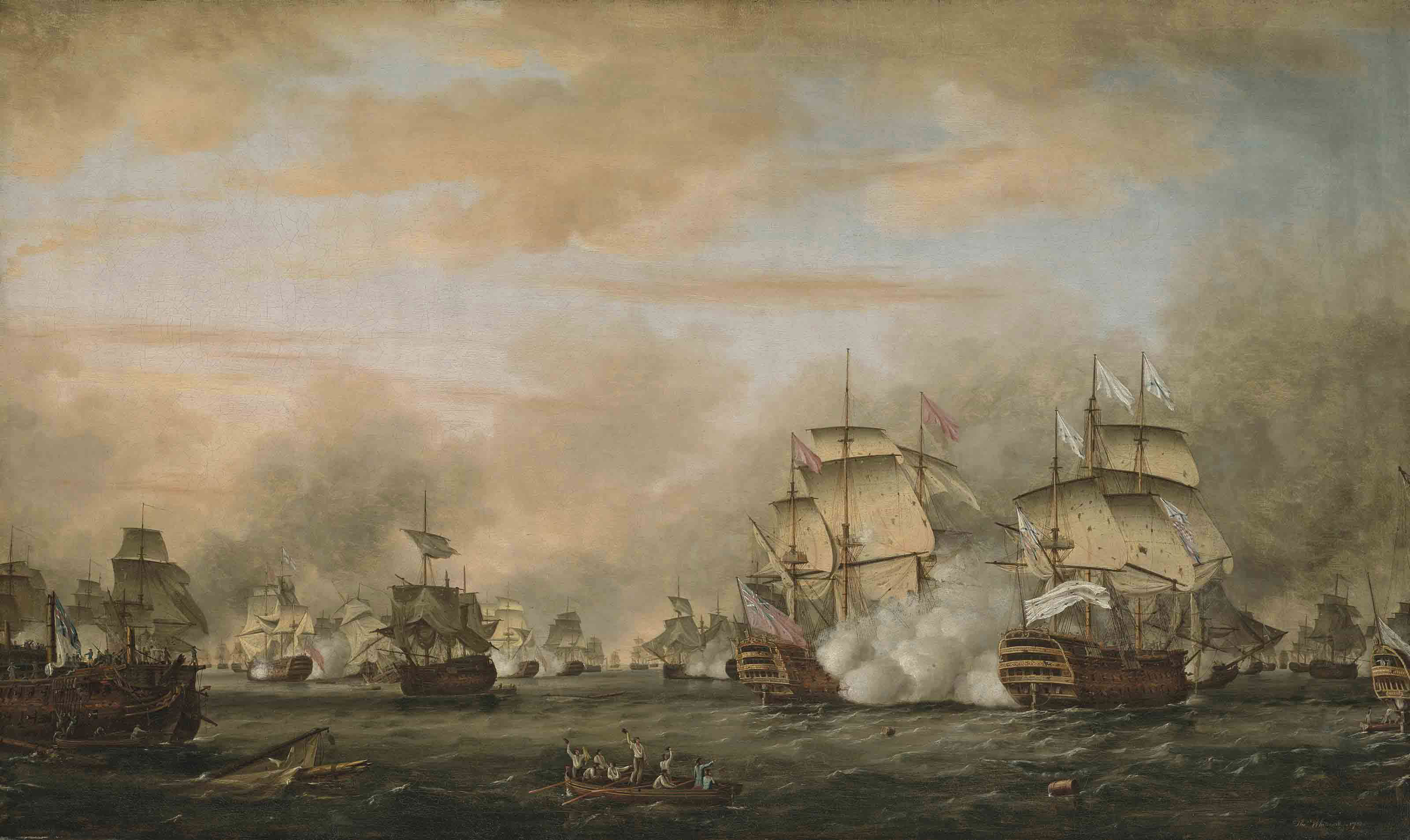
April 12: Battle of the Saintes.

- April 12 – Battle of the Saintes: A British fleet under Admiral Sir George Rodney defeats a French fleet under the Comte de Grasse, in the West Indies.
- April 19 – John Adams secures recognition of the United States as an independent government by the Dutch Republic. During this visit, he also negotiates a loan of five million guilders, financed by Nicolaas van Staphorst and Wilhelm Willink.
- April 21 – A Lak Mueang (city pillar) is erected on Rattanakosin Island, located on the eastern bank of the Chao Phraya River, by order of King Rama I, an act considered the founding of the capital city of Bangkok.
- May 17 – The Parliament of Great Britain passes the Repeal of Act for Securing Dependence of Ireland Act, a major component of the reforms collectively known as the Constitution of 1782, which restore legislative independence to the Parliament of Ireland.
- June 18 – In Switzerland, Anna Göldi is sentenced to death for witchcraft (the last legal witchcraft sentence).
- June 20 – The bald eagle is chosen as the emblem of the United States of America. On the same day, the Confederation Congress adopts the design for the Great Seal of the United States.

==== July–September ====
- July – Joseph II, Holy Roman Emperor, receives a visit from Pope Pius VI.
- July 1 – Raid on Lunenburg: American privateers attack the British settlement at Lunenburg, Nova Scotia.
- July 16–August 29 – The Masonic Congress of Wilhelmsbad, Germany, one of the most important secret society congresses in history, takes place. High-degree Freemasons from the whole of Europe spend the time deliberating the fate of the rite of Strict Observance, and hierarchy of the governing bodies of world Freemasonry, at the Hanau-Wilhelmsbad spa.
- July 16 – Wolfgang Amadeus Mozart's opera Die Entführung aus dem Serail premieres at the Burgtheater in Vienna.
- August 7
  - George Washington orders the creation of the Badge of Military Merit (or the Order of the Purple Heart) to honor soldiers' merit in battle (reinstated later by Franklin D. Roosevelt, and renamed to the more poetic "Purple Heart", to honor soldiers wounded in action).
  - Étienne Maurice Falconet's Bronze Horseman statue of Tsar Peter the Great is unveiled in Saint Petersburg.
- August 19 – A combined British and Native American force defeat Kentucky militiamen in the Battle of Blue Licks in the last major battle of the American Revolutionary War.

==== October–December ====
- October 10 – Welsh actress Sarah Siddons, the pre-eminent star of the English stage, makes a triumphant return to the theatre in the title role of David Garrick's new play, Isabella, or The Fatal Marriage.
- October 18
  - The first franking privilege is granted for official correspondence to be sent at no charge to and from members of the Confederation Congress, at government expense, during periods when the Congress is in session.
  - John Adams returns to Paris as the first United States Minister to France.
- November 4 – Elias Boudinot of New Jersey is elected the new President of the Congress of the Confederation.
- November 30 – American Revolutionary War: In Paris, representatives from the United States and the Kingdom of Great Britain sign preliminary peace articles (later formalized in the Treaty of Paris).
- December 12 – American Revolutionary War: Action of 12 December 1782: A naval engagement off Ferrol, Spain, in which the British ship HMS Mediator commanded by James Luttrell successfully attacks a convoy of French and American ships attempting to supply the United States.
- December 14 – The Montgolfier brothers first test fly a hot air balloon in France; it floats nearly 2 km (1.2 mi).
- December 16 – East India Company: Hada and Mada Miah lead a rebellion in the Indian subcontinent against East India Company officer Robert Lindsay and his troops in Sylhet Shahi Eidgah.

==== Date unknown ====
- Chief Kamehameha I of Hawaii gains control of the northern part of the island of Hawaii, after defeating his cousin Kīwalaʻō.
- Princess Yekaterina Vorontsova-Dashkova is the first woman in the world to direct a scientific academy, the Imperial Academy of Arts and Sciences.
- London creates the Foot Patrol for public security.
- The British Parliament extends James Watt's patent for the steam engine to the year 1800.
- The North Carolina General Assembly incorporates Washington, North Carolina.
- In China, the Complete Library of the Four Treasuries is completed, the largest literary compilation in China's history (surpassing the Yongle Encyclopedia of the 15th century). The books are bound in 36,381 volumes (册) with more than 79,000 chapters (卷), comprising about 2.3 million pages, and approximately 800 million Chinese characters.
- The first theater in the Baltic, the Riga City Theater, is founded.
- Saint Petersburg, Russia has 300,000 inhabitants.

=== 1783 ===
==== January–March ====
- January 20 – At the palace of Versailles, Great Britain signs preliminary peace treaties with the Kingdom of France and the Kingdom of Spain.
- January 23 – The Confederation Congress ratifies two October 8, 1782, treaties signed by the United States with the United Netherlands.
- February 3 – American Revolutionary War: Great Britain acknowledges the independence of the United States of America. At this time, the Spanish government does not grant diplomatic recognition.
- February 4 – American Revolutionary War: Great Britain formally declares that it will cease hostilities with the United States.
- February 5 – 1783 Calabrian earthquakes: The first of a sequence of five earthquakes strikes Calabria, Italy (February 5–7, March 1 & 28), leaving 50,000 dead.
- February 7 – The Great Siege of Gibraltar is abandoned.
- February 26 – The United States Continental Army's Corps of Engineers is disbanded.
- March 5 – The last celebration of Massacre Day is held in Boston, Massachusetts.
- March 15 – Newburgh Conspiracy: A potential uprising in the Continental Army stationed at Newburgh, New York, is defused, when George Washington asks the officers to support the supremacy of the United States Congress.

==== April–June ====
- April – General George Washington sends a letter to the 13 governors of the Confederation of the United States, regarding the needs of the nation.
- April 3 – A Peace and Commercial Treaty is signed between the newly-formed United States and Sweden in Paris, among the first acts of state concluded between the U.S. and a foreign power.
- April 8 – The Crimean Khanate, which has existed since 1441 and is a late remnant of the Mongol Golden Horde, is annexed by the Russian Empire of Catherine the Great.
- April 9–28 – Second Anglo-Mysore War: Siege of Bednore – Tipu Sultan of Mysore with 100,000 troops besieges 1600 British East India Company troops who are obliged to surrender with honours of war.
- April 15 – Preliminary articles of peace ending the American Revolutionary War are ratified by the Congress of the Confederation in the United States.
- April 17 – American Revolutionary War: Colbert's Raid: A Spanish garrison under Captain Jacobo du Breuil defeat British irregulars at Arkansas Post.
- April 18 – Three-Fifths Compromise: The first instance of black slaves in the United States of America being counted as three fifths of persons (for the purpose of taxation), is included in a resolution of the Congress of the Confederation (this is later adopted in the 1787 Constitution).
- May 13 – The Society of the Cincinnati, a fraternal organization for American veterans of the American Revolution, is formed in Newburgh, New York.
- May 18 – The first United Empire Loyalists, fleeing the new United States, reach Parrtown in Saint John, New Brunswick, Canada.
- May 26 – A Great Jubilee Day, celebrating the end of the American Revolution, is held in Trumbull, Connecticut.
- June 4 or June 5 – The Montgolfier brothers publicly demonstrate their hot air balloon at Annonay, France.
- June 8 – The volcano Laki in Iceland begins an 8-month eruption, starting the chain of natural disasters known as the Móðuharðindin, killing tens of thousands throughout Europe, including up to 33% of Iceland's population, and causing widespread famine. It has been described as one of "the greatest environmental catastrophes in European history".

==== July–September ====
- July 16 – Grants of land in Canada to American Loyalists are announced.
- July 24 – The Treaty of Georgievsk is signed between Imperial Russia and the Kingdom of Kartli-Kakheti, making Georgia a protectorate of Russia.
- August 4 – Mount Asama, the most active volcano in Japan, begins a climactic eruption, killing roughly 1,400 people directly and exacerbating a famine, resulting in another 20,000 deaths (Tenmei eruption).
- August 10 – The British East India Company packet ship Antelope (1781) is wrecked off Ulong Island in the Palau (Pelew) group, resulting in the first sustained European contact with those islands.
- August 18 – The 1783 Great Meteor passes on a 1,000-mile track across the North Sea, Great Britain and France, prompting scientific discussion.
- August 27 – Jacques Charles and Les Frères Robert launch the world's first hydrogen-filled balloon, Le Globe, in Paris.
- August – Robert Burns writes his poem "Now Westlin' Winds" or "Composed in August".
- September 3 – Peace of Paris: A treaty between the United States and Great Britain is signed in Paris, formally ending the American Revolutionary War, in which Britain recognizes the independence of the United States; and treaties are signed between Britain, France, and Spain at Versailles, ending hostilities with the Franco-Spanish Alliance.
- September 9 – Dickinson College is chartered in Carlisle, Pennsylvania.

==== October–December ====
- October 3 – The first Waterford Crystal glassmaking business begins production in Waterford, Ireland.
- October 17 – Mozart's Great Mass is first performed, in Salzburg, Austria.
- November 2 – In Rocky Hill, New Jersey, United States General George Washington gives his Farewell Address to the Army.
- November 3 – The American Continental Army is disbanded as the first act of business by the Confederation Congress, after Thomas Mifflin is elected the new President to succeed Elias Boudinot.
- November 21 – In Paris, Jean-François Pilâtre de Rozier and François Laurent, marquis d'Arlandes, make the first untethered hot air balloon flight (flight time: 25 minutes, Maximum height: 900 m).
- November 24 – In Spain, the Cedula of Population is signed, stating that anyone who will swear fealty to Spain and is of the Roman Catholic faith is welcome to populate Trinidad and Tobago.
- November 25 – American Revolutionary War: The last British troops leave New York City and George Washington triumphantly returns, three months after the signing of the Treaty of Paris.
- November 27 – English rector John Michell concludes that some stars might have enough gravity force to prevent light escaping from them, so he calls them "dark stars".
- November 29 – 1783 New Jersey earthquake: An earthquake of 5.3 magnitude strikes New Jersey.
- December 1 – Jacques Charles and Nicolas-Louis Robert make the first manned flight in a hydrogen-filled gas balloon in Paris.
- December 4 – At Fraunces Tavern in New York City, U.S. General George Washington formally bids his officers farewell.
- December 19 – William Pitt the Younger becomes Prime Minister of Great Britain.

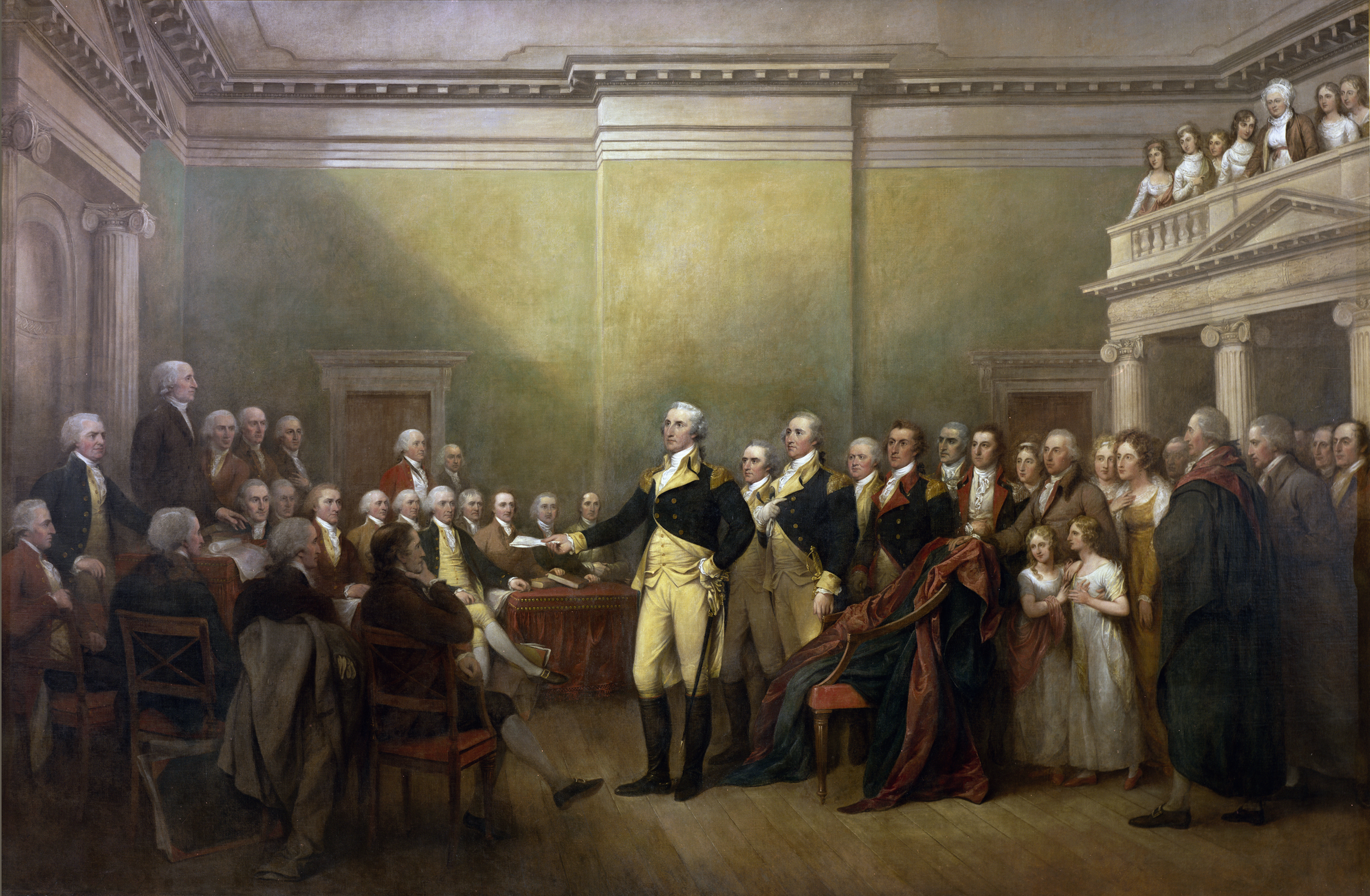
December 23: General George Washington Resigning His Commission

- December 23 – General George Washington resigns his commission as commander-in-chief of the Continental Army to the Congress of the Confederation in the Maryland State House in Annapolis, Maryland, and retires to his home at Mount Vernon. Washington's resignation, described by historian Thomas Fleming as "the most important moment in American history," affirms the United States' commitment to the principle of civilian control of the military, and prompts King George III to call Washington "the greatest character of the age."
- December 31 – Louis-Sébastien Lenormand makes the first ever recorded public demonstration of a parachute descent, by jumping from the tower of the Montpellier Observatory in France, using his rigid-framed model, which he intends as a form of fire escape.

==== Date unknown ====
- Loyalists from New York settle Great Abaco in the Bahamas.
- The city of Sevastopol is founded on the Crimean Peninsula of the Russian Empire, by Rear Admiral Thomas MacKenzie.
- Princess Yekaterina Vorontsova-Dashkova is elected an honorary member of the Royal Swedish Academy of Sciences, the first female foreign member and its second female member, after Eva Ekeblad.
- The Evan Williams (bourbon) distillery is founded in Bardstown, Kentucky.
- Ahmed ibn Muhammad ibn Khalifa, the Emir of Zubarah conquers and rules Bahrain. Shaikh Ahmed restores Arab independence and sovereignty over Bahrain and makes the islands his summer residence.

=== 1784 ===
==== January–March ====
- January 6 – Treaty of Constantinople: The Ottoman Empire agrees to Russia's annexation of the Crimea.
- January 14 – The Congress of the United States ratifies the Treaty of Paris with Great Britain to end the American Revolution, with the signature of President of Congress Thomas Mifflin.
- January 15 – Henry Cavendish's paper to the Royal Society of London, Experiments on Air, reveals the composition of water.
- February 24 – The Captivity of Mangalorean Catholics at Seringapatam begins.
- February 28 – John Wesley ordains ministers for the Methodist Church in the United States.
- March 1 – The Confederation Congress accepts Virginia's cession of all rights to the Northwest Territory and to Kentucky (Illinois County).
- March 22 – The Emerald Buddha is installed at the Wat Phra Kaew, on the grounds of the Grand Palace in Bangkok (or in 1785).

==== April–June ====
- April 23 – The Congress of the Confederation passes the Ordinance of Governance to set guidelines for adding to the original 13 states in the United States of America.
- April 27 – The Marriage of Figaro, written by playwright Pierre Beaumarchais as a sequel to The Barber of Seville, premieres at the Comédie-Française in Paris.
- May 12 – The Treaty of Paris, signed on September 3 the previous year, comes into effect.
- May 20 – A treaty is signed in Paris between the Kingdom of Great Britain and the Dutch Republic, formally ending the Fourth Anglo-Dutch War.
- June 4 – Élisabeth Thible is the first woman to ascend in a hot-air balloon, at Lyon, France.

==== July–September ====
- July 9 – The Bank of New York opens as the first in New York state and continues to operate under that name for almost 223 years until being acquired by Mellon Financial and becoming BNY Mellon.
- July 29 – The United States and the Kingdom of France sign a convention for establishing diplomatic relations and "determining the functions and prerogatives of their respective consuls, vice consuls, agents, and commissaries".
- August 13 – Parliament of Great Britain passes Pitt's India Act (An Act for the better Regulation and Management of the Affairs of the East India Company and of the British Possessions in India). It requires the governor-general to be chosen from outside the Company and makes company directors subject to parliamentary supervision.
- August 16 – Britain creates the colony of New Brunswick.
- September 19 – In France, the Robert brothers (Anne-Jean Robert and Nicolas-Louis Robert) and a Mr. Collin-Hullin (whose first name is lost to history) become the first people to fly more than 100 km or 100 miles in the air, lifting off from Paris and landing 6 hours and 40 minutes later near Bethune after a journey of 186 kilometres (116 mi).
- September 22 – Russia establishes a colony at Kodiak, Alaska.

==== October–December ====
- October 8 – "Kettle War", a 1-day action on the Scheldt in which a ship of the Dutch Republic repels forces of the Holy Roman Empire.
- October 22 – North Carolina rescinds its resolution ceding its western territory (Washington District, modern-day Tennessee) to the United States, after earlier giving Congress two years to accept the terms.
- October 31–December 14 – The Revolt of Horea, Cloșca and Crișan in Transylvania causes Joseph II, Holy Roman Emperor to suspend the Hungarian Constitution.
- November 26 – The Roman Catholic Apostolic Prefecture of the United States is established.
- November 27 – The phenomenon of black holes is first posited in a paper by John Michell, in the Philosophical Transactions of the Royal Society of London.
- November 30 – Richard Henry Lee of Virginia is selected as the new President of the Confederation Congress.
- December – Immanuel Kant's essay "Answering the Question: What Is Enlightenment?" is published.
- December 25 – The Methodist Episcopal Church in the United States is officially formed at the "Christmas Conference", led by Thomas Coke and Francis Asbury.

==== Date unknown ====
- Britain receives its first bales of imported American cotton.
- King Carlos III of the Spanish Empire authorizes land grants in Alta California.
- Princess Yekaterina Vorontsova-Dashkova is named first president of the newly created Russian Academy.
- The North Carolina General Assembly incorporates the town of Morgansborough, named for Daniel Morgan. The town is designated as the county seat for Burke County, North Carolina and is subsequently renamed Morgan, later shortened to Morganton.
- The North Carolina General Assembly changes the name of Kingston, North Carolina, originally named for King George III of Great Britain, to Kinston.
- Great Tenmei famine in Edo period Japan continues, as 300,000 die of starvation.
- A huge locust swarm hits South Africa.
- Foundation of the first theater in Estonia, the Tallinna saksa teater.
- Benjamin Franklin invents bifocal spectacles.
- Benjamin Franklin tries in vain to persuade the French to alter their clocks in winter to take advantage of the daylight.
- Antoine Lavoisier pioneers quantitative chemistry.
- Cholesterol is isolated.
- Carl Friedrich Gauss pioneers the field of summation with the formula summing at the age of 7.
- Madame du Coudray, pioneer of modern midwifery, retires.

=== 1785 ===
==== January–March ====
- January 1
  - The Burmese Konbaung Dynasty annexes the Mrauk U Kingdom of Arakan.
  - The first issue of the Daily Universal Register, later known as The Times, is published in London.
- January 7 – Frenchman Jean-Pierre Blanchard and American John Jeffries travel from Dover, England to Calais, France in a hydrogen gas balloon, becoming the first to cross the English Channel by air.
- January 11 – Richard Henry Lee is elected as President of the U.S. Congress of the Confederation.
- January 20 – Battle of Rạch Gầm-Xoài Mút: Invading Siamese forces, attempting to exploit the political chaos in Vietnam, are ambushed and annihilated at the Mekong River by the Tây Sơn.
- January 27 – The University of Georgia in the United States is chartered by the Georgia General Assembly meeting in Savannah. The first students are admitted in Athens, Georgia in 1801.
- February 9 – Sir Warren Hastings, who has been governing India on behalf of King George III as the Governor-General of the Presidency of Fort William (later British India), resigns. Sir John Macpherson administers British India until General Charles Cornwallis arrives 19 months later.
- February 27 – The Confederation Congress votes an $80,000 expense to establish diplomatic relations with Morocco.
- March 7 – Scottish geologist James Hutton first presents his landmark work, Theory of the Earth; or an Investigation of the Laws observable in the Composition, Dissolution, and Restoration of Land upon the Globe to the Royal Society of Edinburgh.
- General Henry Knox is appointed as the Confederation Congress's Secretary of War, with added duties as the Secretary of Navy, both functions later of the U.S. Department of Defense.
- March 10
  - American engineer James Rumsey sends a letter to George Washington informing of his plans to create a steamboat.
  - Thomas Jefferson is appointed the new U.S. Minister to France, and Benjamin Franklin's request for permission to return home is accepted.

==== April–June ====
- April 19 – The Commonwealth of Massachusetts cedes all of its claims to territory west of New York State to the United States Confederation Congress. The area will become the southern portions of Michigan and Wisconsin.
- April 21 – The Empress Catherine the Great of the Russian Empire issues the Charter to the Towns, providing for "a coherent, unified system of administration" for new governments organized in Russia.
- April 26 – John Adams is appointed as the U.S. ambassador to the United Kingdom, and Thomas Jefferson as ambassador to France.
- April 28 – Astronomer William Herschel begins his second series of surveys of the stars, published in 1789.
- May 10 – An unmanned hot air balloon released as part of a bet crashes in Tullamore, Ireland, causing a fire that burns down about 100 houses, making it the world's first aviation disaster (by 36 days). The town’s coat of arms now represents a phoenix emerging from the ashes.
- May 20 – The Northwest Ordinance of 1785, setting the rules for dividing the U.S. Northwest Territory (later Ohio, Indiana, Illinois, Wisconsin and Michigan) into townships of 36 square miles apiece, is passed by the Confederation Congress. The survey system will later be applied to the continent west of the Mississippi River.
- May 23 – Benjamin Franklin receives a patent for bifocals.
- June 3 – The United States' Continental Navy is disbanded.
- June 15 – After several attempts, Jean-François Pilâtre de Rozier and his companion, Pierre Romain, set off in a balloon from Boulogne-sur-Mer, but the balloon suddenly deflates (without the envelope catching fire) and crashes near Wimereux in the Pas-de-Calais, killing both men, making it the first fatal aviation disaster.

==== July–September ====
- July 2 – Don Diego de Gardoqui arrives in New York City as Spain's first minister to the United States.
- July 6 – The dollar (and a decimal currency system) is unanimously chosen as the money unit for the United States by the Congress of the Confederation.
- July 16 – The Piper-Heidsieck Champagne house is founded by Florens-Louis Heidsieck in Reims, France.
- August 1 – The fleet of French explorer Jean-François de Galaup, comte de Lapérouse leaves Paris for the circumnavigation of the globe.
- August 15 – Cardinal de Rohan is arrested in Paris; the Affair of the Diamond Necklace comes into the open.
- September 10 – The United States and the Kingdom of Prussia sign a Treaty of Amity and Commerce.
- September 13
  - The Bank of North America, central bank for the Confederation Congress government, loses its charter.
  - Benjamin Franklin returns to Philadelphia after seven years as the U.S. Ambassador to France and prepares to take office as the new Governor of Pennsylvania.

==== October–December ====
- October 5 – Vincenzo Lunardi of Italy becomes the first person to pilot a balloon over Scotland.
- October 13
  - The first newspaper in British India, the English-language Madras Courier, is published. It continues publication as a weekly until 1794.
  - France mints new Louis d'or coins, with the image of King Louis XVI on the obverse, and one-sixth less gold than the coins with King Louis XV's image.
- October 17 – The Commonwealth of Virginia stops the importation of new African slaves by declaring that "No persons shall henceforth be slaves within this commonwealth, except such as were so on the seventeenth day of October, 1785, and the descendants of the females of them."
- October 18 – Benjamin Franklin takes office as the new President of the Supreme Council of Pennsylvania, at the time the equivalent of a republic as one of the 13 independent governments of the United States of America under the Articles of Confederation.
- November 23 – John Hancock of Massachusetts, the former President of the Continental Congress, is selected as the new President of the Congress of the Confederation, but is unable to take office because of illness.
- November 28 – The Treaty of Hopewell is signed between the United States of America and the Cherokee Nation.
- December 11 – An edict is issued limiting Masonic lodges throughout the Holy Roman Empire by Emperor Joseph II. With the exception of Vienna, Budapest and Prague, no Empire province may have more than one lodge.

==== Date unknown ====
- The University of New Brunswick is founded in Fredericton, New Brunswick.
- Coal gas is first used for illumination.
- Louis XVI signs a law that a handkerchief must be square.
- The British government establishes a permanent land force in the Eastern Caribbean, based in Barbados.
- Belfast Academy (later Belfast Royal Academy) is founded by Rev. James Crombie in Belfast, Northern Ireland.
- Friedrich Heinrich Jacobi publishes Letters on the Teachings of Spinoza, and starts the Pantheism controversy.
- Napoleon Bonaparte becomes a lieutenant in the French artillery.
- Cabinet des Modes, the first fashion magazine, is published in France.
- Mozart's "Haydn" String Quartets are published, as is his collaboration with Salieri and Cornetti, Per la ricuperata salute di Ofelia.
- Charles Adams, John Adams’ son and John Quincy Adams's brother, enters Harvard in August at age 15. A few months later, he starts to drink often and to get into trouble, and is almost expelled when he is caught running naked through the Campus while drunk with other boys.

=== 1786 ===
==== January–March ====
- January 3 – The third Treaty of Hopewell is signed between the United States and the Choctaw.
- January 6 – The outward bound East Indiaman Halsewell is wrecked on the south coast of England in a storm, with only 74 of more than 240 on board surviving.
- February 2 – In a speech before The Asiatic Society in Calcutta, Sir William Jones notes the formal resemblances between Latin, Greek, and Sanskrit, laying the foundation for comparative linguistics and Indo-European studies.
- March 1 – The Ohio Company of Associates is organized by five businessmen at a meeting at the Bunch-of-Grapes Tavern in Boston to purchase land from the United States government to form settlements in the modern-day U.S. state of Ohio.
- March 13 – Construction begins in Dublin on the Four Courts Building, with the first stone laid down by the United Kingdom's Viceroy for Ireland, the Duke of Rutland.

==== April–June ====
- April 2 – The Creek Nation declares war on the U.S. State of Georgia over the matter of white settlers on land not ceded by the Nation. A truce is negotiated on April 17 between Creek Chief Alexander McGillivray (Hoboi-Hili-Miko) and U.S. Army General Lachlan McIntosh but is soon repudiated.
- April 11 – Columbia College (modern-day Columbia University) holds its first graduation, with eight students, including DeWitt Clinton.
- April 25 – The United States and the Kingdom of Portugal sign their first commercial treaty, but it is never ratified.
- April 27 – British astronomer William Herschel publishes his first list of his discoveries, Catalogue of One Thousand New Nebulae and Clusters of Stars; two additional books are published in 1789 and 1802.
- May 1 – Wolfgang Amadeus Mozart's opera The Marriage of Figaro premieres in Vienna.
- May 21 – The trial in the Affair of the Diamond Necklace ends in Paris.
- June 2 – The Tignon law is enacted by Spanish Governor of Louisiana Esteban Rodríguez Miró, to force black women to wear a tignon headscarf.
- June 6 – Nathaniel Gorham is chosen as the new President of the U.S. Confederation Congress to substitute for John Hancock, who cannot take office because of illness.
- June 10 – An earthquake-caused landslide dam on the Dadu River gives way, killing 100,000 in the Sichuan province of China.
- June 25 – Gavriil Pribylov discovers St. George Island of the Pribilof Islands in the Bering Sea.

==== July–September ====
- July 14 – Convention of London between the Kingdom of Great Britain and the Kingdom of Spain: British settlements on the Mosquito Coast of Central America are to be evacuated; Spain expands the territory available to the British in Belize on the Yucatán Peninsula, for cutting mahogany.
- July 31 – The 'Kilmarnock volume' of Robert Burns' Poems, Chiefly in the Scottish Dialect is published in Scotland.
- August
  - James Rumsey tests his first steamboat on the Potomac River, at Shepherdstown, Virginia.
  - The Cabinet of Great Britain approves the establishment of a penal colony, at Botany Bay in Australia.
- August 1 – Caroline Herschel discovers a comet (the first discovered by a woman) from England.
- August 8 – Mont Blanc is climbed for the first time, by Michel-Gabriel Paccard and Jacques Balmat.
- August 11 – Captain Francis Light acquires the island of Penang from the Sultan of Kedah on behalf of the British East India Company, renaming it Prince of Wales Island in honour of the heir to the British throne, and establishing the settlement of George Town. This is the first colony of the British Empire in Southeast Asia.
- August 17 – Frederick William II, the paternal nephew of Frederick the Great, becomes King of Prussia.
- August 18 – The Kingdom of Denmark-Norway charters six settlements in Iceland to trade with it, thus ending the Danish–Icelandic Trade Monopoly, and founding Reykjavík.
- August 29 – Shays' Rebellion begins in Massachusetts.
- September–December – Goethe undertakes his Italian Journey (published in 1817).
- September 2 – A hurricane strikes Barbados.
- September 11–14 - The Annapolis Convention is held by delegates from six of the 13 states (Maryland, Virginia, Pennsylvania, Delaware, New Jersey and New York) resulting in the scheduling of the Philadelphia Convention to draft a national constitution.
- September 14 – Connecticut cedes to the United States all of its claims to lands between the 41st and 42nd parallels north and west of the Connecticut Western Reserve.
- September 25 – The mine of Huancavelica in the Peruvian Andes collapses killing more than a hundred people. The event is a major setback for quicksilver production in the Spanish Empire.
- September 26 – Eden Agreement: A commercial treaty is signed between the Kingdoms of Great Britain and France.

==== October–December ====
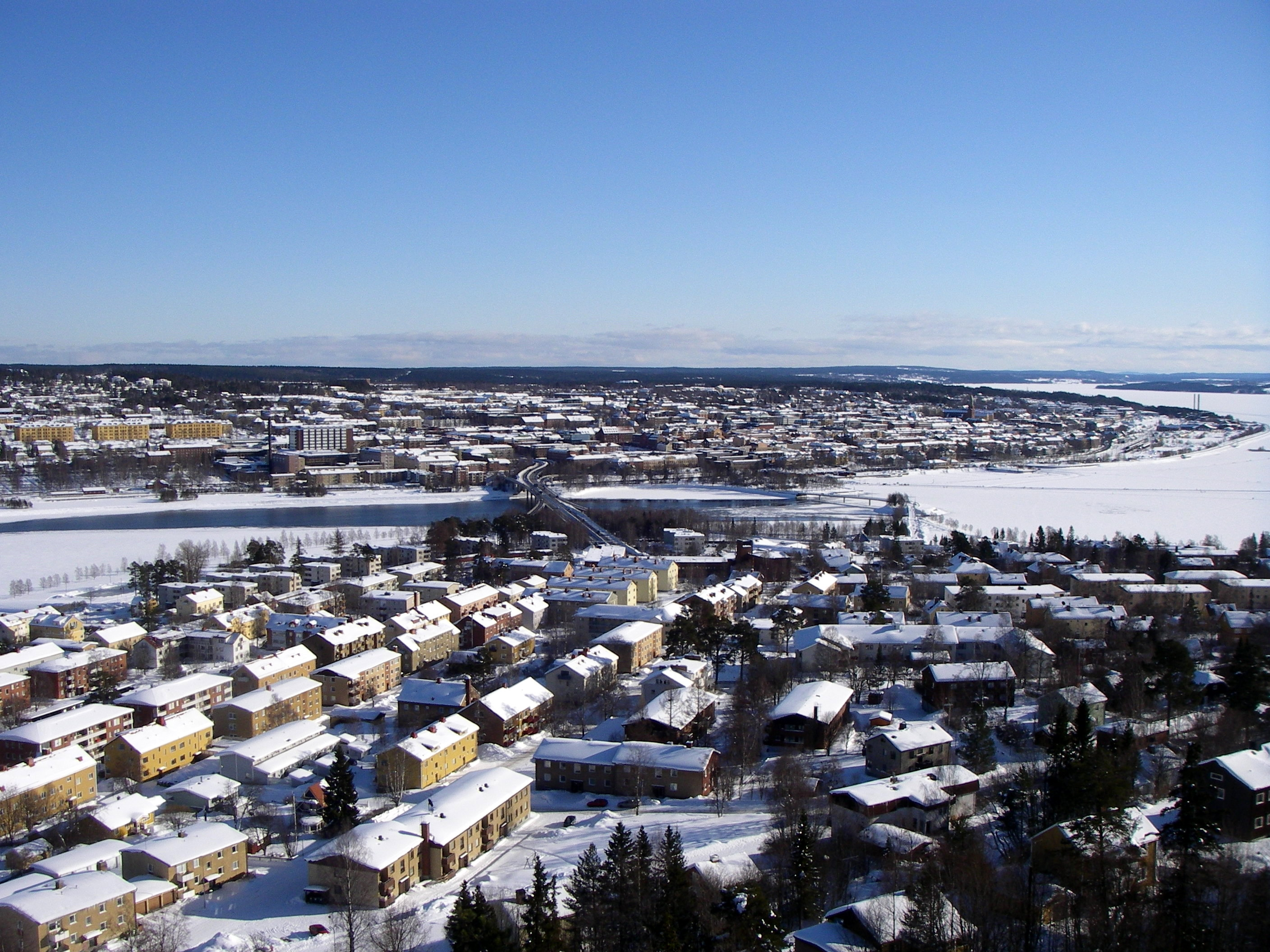
Östersund

- October 6 – HMS Bellerophon begins service with the Royal Navy.
- October 10 – The Confederation Congress of the United States directs backpay for seven months for Virginia officers who have been waiting since 1782.
- October 12 – King George III of the United Kingdom appoints Captain Arthur Phillip as the first Governor of New Holland, which comprises the area of modern Australia from the 135th meridian east to the east coast and all adjacent islands in the Pacific Ocean.
- October 16 – The Confederation Congress establishes the United States Mint to make common coinage and currency for the U.S., to replace individual state coins.
- October 23
  - The 13th century AH begins on the Islamic calendar on the 1st of Muharram 1201 AH
  - The settlement of Östersund is established in Sweden.
- October 24 – General David Cobb of the Massachusetts militia defeats a body of rebel insurgents at Taunton, Massachusetts in one of the battles of Shays' Rebellion.
- November 7 – The oldest musical organization in the United States, the Stoughton Musical Society, is founded.
- November 30 – Peter Leopold Joseph of Habsburg-Lorraine, Grand Duke of Tuscany, promulgates a penal reform, making his country the first state to abolish the death penalty. This day is therefore commemorated by 300 cities around the world as Cities for Life Day.
- December 4 – Mission Santa Barbara is founded by Padre Fermín Lasuén as the tenth of the Spanish missions in California.
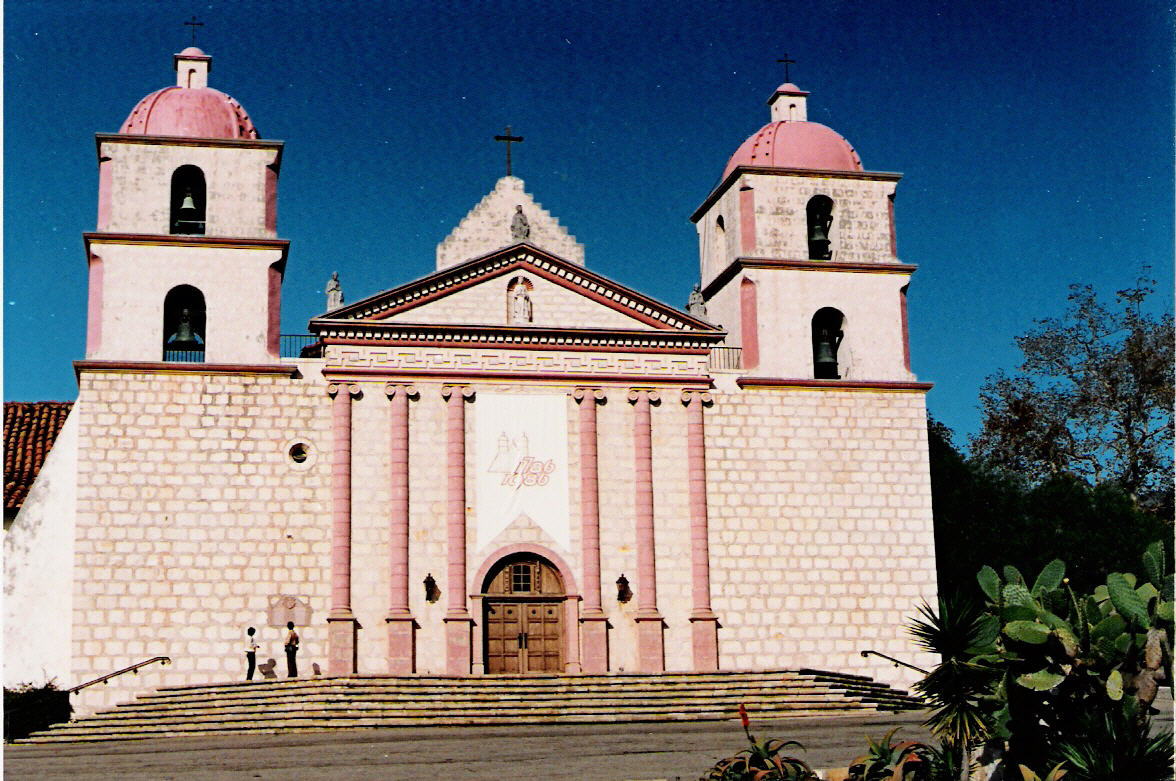
  December 4: Mission Santa Barbara is founded.
- December 20 – Robert Burns's Address to a Haggis is first published, in Edinburgh.

==== Date unknown ====
- Winter 1786/87 – English captain George Dixon becomes the first European to visit the Hawaiian island of Molokaʻi.
- The town of Martinsborough, North Carolina, named for Royal Governor Josiah Martin in 1771, is renamed "Greenesville" in honor of United States General Nathanael Greene by the North Carolina General Assembly (the name "Greenesville" is later shortened, to become Greenville).
- The last reliably recorded wolf in Ireland is hunted down and killed near Mount Leinster, County Carlow, for killing sheep.

=== 1787 ===
==== January–March ====
- January 9 – The North Carolina General Assembly authorizes nine commissioners to purchase 100 acres (0.40 km^{2}) of land for the seat of Chatham County. The town is named Pittsborough (later shortened to Pittsboro), for William Pitt the Younger.
- January 11 – William Herschel discovers Titania and Oberon, two moons of Uranus.
- January 19 – Mozart's Symphony No. 38 is premièred in Prague.
- February 2 – Arthur St. Clair of Pennsylvania is chosen as the new President of the Congress of the Confederation.
- February 4 – Shays' Rebellion in Massachusetts fails.
- February 21 – The Confederation Congress sends word to the 13 states that a convention will be held in Philadelphia on May 14 to revise the Articles of Confederation.
- February 28 – A charter is granted, establishing the institution which will become the University of Pittsburgh.
- March 3 – By a vote of 33 to 29, Harrisburg is approved as the new capital of Pennsylvania.
- March 17 – The Bank of North America, the central bank of the United States government under the Articles of Confederation, is re-incorporated after its charter had expired in 1786.
- March 28 – In the British House of Commons, Henry Beaufoy files the first motion to repeal the Test Act 1673, which restricts the rights of non-members of the Church of England.; Beaufoy's motion is rejected, and the Act is not repealed until 1829.
- March 30 – Biblical theology becomes a separate discipline from biblical studies, as Johann Philipp Gabler delivers his speech "On the proper distinction between biblical and dogmatic theology and the specific objectives of each" upon his inauguration as the professor of theology at the University of Altdorf in Germany.

==== April–June ====
- April 2 – A Charter of Justice is signed, providing the authority for the establishment of the first New South Wales (i.e. Australian) Courts of Criminal and Civil Jurisdiction.
- April 25 – The Customs and Excise Act 1787 receives Royal assent. It replaced all customs duties, which included poundage, by a system where individual tariffs would be applied to importations.
- May 7 – The New Church (Swedenborgian) is founded in England.
- May 13 – Captain Arthur Phillip leaves Portsmouth, England, with the 11 ships of the First Fleet, carrying around 700 convicts and at least 300 crew and guards to establish a penal colony in Australia.
- May 14 – In Philadelphia, delegates begin arriving for a Constitutional Convention.
- May 22 – In Britain, Thomas Clarkson and Granville Sharp found the Society for Effecting the Abolition of the Slave Trade, with support from John Wesley, Josiah Wedgwood and others.
- May 25 – In Philadelphia, delegates begin to convene the Constitutional Convention, intended to amend the Articles of Confederation (however, a new United States Constitution is eventually produced). George Washington presides over the Convention.
- May – Orangist troops attack Vreeswijk, Harmelen and Maarssen; civil war starts in the Dutch Republic.
- May 31 – The original Lord's Cricket Ground in London holds its first cricket match; Marylebone Cricket Club founded.
- June 20 – Oliver Ellsworth moves at the Federal Convention that the government be called the United States.
- June 28 – Princess Wilhelmina of Orange, sister of King Frederick William II of Prussia, is captured by Dutch Republican patriots, taken to Goejanverwellesluis and not allowed to travel to The Hague.

==== July–September ====
- July 13 – The Congress of the Confederation enacts the Northwest Ordinance, establishing governing rules for the Northwest Territory (the future states of Ohio, Indiana, Illinois, Michigan and Wisconsin). It also establishes procedures for the admission of new states, and limits the expansion of slavery.
- July 18 – The United States ratifies its first treaty with the Sultanate of Morocco.
- August 9 – South Carolina cedes to the United States its claims to a 12-mile wide strip of land that runs across northern Alabama and Mississippi.
- August 10 – Wolfgang Amadeus Mozart composes his famous Eine kleine Nachtmusik.
- August 27 – Launching a 45-foot (14 m) steam powered craft on the Delaware River, John Fitch demonstrates the first U.S. patent for his design.
- September 4 – The first secondary school open to girls in Denmark, J. Cl. Todes Døtreskole, is founded in Copenhagen.
- September 13 – Prussian troops invade the Dutch Republic; two days later the Rhinegrave Salm gives up Utrecht. Within a few weeks 40,000 Patriots (out of a population of 2,000,000) go into exile in Northern France.
- September 17 – The United States Constitution is signed by the Constitutional Convention in Philadelphia.
- September 24 – Washington Academy (later Washington & Jefferson College) is chartered by the Pennsylvania General Assembly.

==== October–December ====
- October 1 – Russo-Turkish War (1787–1792): Battle of Kinburn – Alexander Suvorov, though sustaining a wound, routs the Turks.
- October 27 – The first of The Federalist Papers, a series of essays calling for ratification of the U.S. Constitution, is published in The Independent Journal, a New York newspaper.
- October 29 – Wolfgang Amadeus Mozart's opera Don Giovanni (libretto by Lorenzo Da Ponte) premieres in the Estates Theatre in Prague.
- November 1 – The first secondary school open to girls in Sweden, Societetsskolan, is founded in Gothenburg.
- November 21 – Treaty of Versailles (1787) signed, forming an alliance between the Kingdom of France and the Lord Nguyễn Phúc Ánh, future Emperor of Vietnam.
- December 3 – James Rumsey demonstrates his water-jet propelled boat on the Potomac River.
- December 7 – Delaware ratifies the Constitution, and becomes the first U.S. state.
- December 8 – La Purisima Mission is founded by Padre Fermín Lasuén as the eleventh of the Spanish missions in California.
- December 12 – Pennsylvania becomes the second U.S. state.
- December 18 – New Jersey becomes the third U.S. state.
- December 23 – Captain William Bligh sets sail from England for Tahiti, on HMS Bounty.

==== Date unknown ====
- Caroline Herschel is granted an annual salary of £50, by King George III of Great Britain, for acting as assistant to her brother William in astronomy.
- The North Carolina General Assembly incorporates Waynesborough, and designates it the seat for Wayne County, North Carolina. The town becomes extinct after 1865.
- Antoine Lavoisier is the first to suggest that silica is an oxide of a hitherto unknown metallic chemical element, later isolated and named silicon.
- A fossil bone recovered from Cretaceous strata at Woodbury, New Jersey is discussed by the American Philosophical Society in Philadelphia.

=== 1788 ===
==== January–March ====
- January 1 – The first edition of The Times, previously The Daily Universal Register, is published in London.
- January 2 – Georgia ratifies the United States Constitution, and becomes the fourth U.S. state under the new government.
- January 9 – Connecticut ratifies the United States Constitution, and becomes the fifth U.S. state.
- January 18 – The leading ship (armed tender HMS Supply) in Captain Arthur Phillip's First Fleet arrives at Botany Bay, to colonise Australia.
- January 22 – The Congress of the Confederation, effectively a caretaker government until the United States Constitution can be ratified by at least nine of the 13 states, elects Cyrus Griffin as its last president.
- January 24 – The La Perouse expedition in the Astrolabe and Boussole arrives off Botany Bay, just as Captain Arthur Phillip is attempting to move his colony from there to Sydney Cove in Port Jackson.
- January 26 – Eleven ships of the First Fleet from Botany Bay, led by Captain Arthur Phillip, land at Sydney Cove (which will become Sydney), Australia, where he determines to establish the British prison colony of New South Wales, the first permanent European settlement on the continent.
- January 31 – Henry Benedict Stuart becomes the new Stuart claimant to the throne of Great Britain, as King Henry IX and the figurehead of Jacobitism.
- February 1 – Isaac Briggs and William Longstreet patent a steamboat.
- February 6 – Massachusetts ratifies the United States Constitution, and becomes the sixth U.S. state.
- February 7 – Sydney is named and founded, in the British colony of New South Wales.
- February 9 – Austria enters the Russo-Turkish War (1787–92), and attacks Moldavia.
- February 17 – The uninhabited Lord Howe Island is discovered by the brig HMS Supply, commanded by Lieutenant Ball, who is on his way from Botany Bay to Norfolk Island with convicts to start a penal settlement there. They arrive at Norfolk Island on March 6.
- March 10 – The La Perouse expedition leaves Sydney Cove for New Caledonia, never to be seen again.
- March 14 – The Edinburgh Evening Courant carries a notice of £200 reward for the capture of William Brodie, a town councilor doubling as a burglar.
- March 21 – The Great New Orleans Fire destroys 856 buildings, including St. Louis Cathedral and The Cabildo, leaving most of the town in ruins.

==== April–June ====
- April 7 – American pioneers establish the town of Marietta (in modern-day Ohio), the first permanent American settlement outside the original Thirteen Colonies.
- April 13 – America's first recorded riot, the 'Doctors' Mob', begins. Residents of Manhattan are angry about grave robbers stealing bodies for doctors to dissect. The rioting is suppressed on April 15.
- April 28 – Maryland ratifies the United States Constitution, and becomes the seventh U.S. state.
- May 10 – The Royal Dramatic Theatre (Kungliga Dramatiska Teatern), Sweden's national drama company, is founded.
- May 15 – The Australian frontier wars begins. With the placement of a cournerstone.
- May 23 – South Carolina ratifies the United States Constitution, and becomes the eighth U.S. state.
- June 7 – France: Day of the Tiles, which some consider the beginning of the French Revolution.
- June 9 – The African Association, an exploration group dedicated to plotting the Niger River and finding Timbuktu, is founded in England.
- June 17 – English captains Thomas Gilbert and John Marshall, returning from Botany Bay, become the first Europeans to encounter the Gilbert Islands in the Pacific Ocean. They also chart islands in "Lord Mulgrove's range", later known as the Marshall Islands.
- June 21 – New Hampshire ratifies the United States Constitution, and becomes the ninth U.S. state, enabling the Constitution to go into effect. (The latter happens on March 4, 1789, when the first Congress elected under the new Constitution assembles.)
- June 25 – The Virginia Ratifying Convention ratifies the United States Constitution, and becomes the tenth U.S. state under the new government.
- June 26 – Wolfgang Amadeus Mozart, in Vienna, completes his antepenultimate symphony, the Symphony No. 39 in E-flat.
- June 27 – The Russo-Swedish War (1788–1790) breaks out following a staged attack on Swedish troops in Puumala, present-day Finland.

==== July–September ====
- July 13 – A hailstorm sweeps across France and the Dutch Republic, with hailstones 'as big as quart bottles' that take 'three days to melt'; immense damage is done.
- July 24 – Governor General Lord Dorchester, by proclamation issued from the Chateau St. Louis in Quebec City, divides the British Province of Quebec into five Districts, namely: Gaspé, Nassau, Lunenburg, Mecklenburg, and Hesse.
- July 26 – New York ratifies the United States Constitution, and becomes the eleventh U.S. state.
- July 28 – Wolfgang Amadeus Mozart, in Vienna, completes his penultimate symphony, the Symphony No. 40 in G Minor.
- August 8 – King Louis XVI agrees to convene the Estates-General meeting in May 1789, the first time since 1614.
- August 10 – Emperor Shah Alam II was blinded by a maddened Indo-Afghan commander Ghulam Qadir Rohilla who sought revenge against the Mughal Empire.
- August 10 – Wolfgang Amadeus Mozart, in Vienna, completes his final symphony, the Symphony No. 41 in C Major, and nicknamed (after his death) The Jupiter.
- August 12 – The Anjala conspiracy is signed.
- August 27 – The trial of Deacon William Brodie for burglary begins in Edinburgh, Scotland; he is sentenced to death by hanging.
- September 13 – The United States Congress of the Confederation passes an act providing a timeline for the voting for the first President under the new U.S. Constitution.
- September 21 – Austro-Turkish War - Battle of Karánsebes: The Austrian army engages in a friendly-fire incident, which results in mass casualties.
- September 24 – The Theater War begins, when the army of Denmark–Norway invades Sweden.

==== October–December ====
- October 1 – William Brodie is hanged at the Tolbooth in Edinburgh.
- October 21 – The 14th and last session of the Continental Congress and (the 6th as Congress under the Articles of Confederation) is adjourned.
- October – King George III of the United Kingdom becomes deranged; the Regency Crisis of 1788 starts.
- November 8 – Voting takes place in the 11 states that have ratified the United States Constitution for the first U.S. Senators; in Virginia, Richard Henry Lee and William Grayson, both anti-federalists, receive the highest number of votes in the Virginia Senate.
- November 15 – Cyrus Griffin of Virginia completes his service as the last President of the Congress of the Confederation, under the Articles of Confederation.
- November 20 – In the United Kingdom, the Houses of Parliament are given the first formal report by Prime Minister Pitt of the mental illness of King George III. Parliament adjourns for two weeks, to await the results of examinations by royal physicians.
- November 25 – Fifty consecutive days of temperatures below freezing strike France, a record that will be unbroken more than 200 years later.
- December 6 – Russo-Turkish War (1787–92): The Ottoman fortress of Ochakiv falls to the Russians after a prolonged siege, and a murderous storm with a temperature of −23 °C (−9 °F).
- December 14 – King Charles III of Spain dies, and is succeeded by his son Charles IV.
- December – Robert Burns writes his version of the Scots poem Auld Lang Syne.

==== Undated ====
- Annual British iron production reaches 68,000 tons.

=== 1789 ===
French Revolution: June 20: Tennis Court Oath, drawing by David.

==== January–March ====
- January – Emmanuel Joseph Sieyès publishes the pamphlet What Is the Third Estate? (Qu'est-ce que le tiers-état?), influential on the French Revolution.
- January 7 – The 1788-89 United States presidential election and House of Representatives elections are held.
- January 9 – Treaty of Fort Harmar: The terms of the Treaty of Fort Stanwix (1784) and the Treaty of Fort McIntosh, between the United States Government and certain native American tribes, are reaffirmed, with some minor changes.
- January 21 – The first American novel, The Power of Sympathy or the Triumph of Nature Founded in Truth, is printed in Boston, Massachusetts. The anonymous author is William Hill Brown.
- January 23 – Georgetown University is founded in Georgetown, Maryland (part of modern-day Washington, D.C.), as the first Roman Catholic college in the United States.
- January 29 – In Vietnam, Emperor Quang Trung crushes the Chinese Qing forces in Ngọc Hồi-Đống Đa. It is considered one of the greatest victories in Vietnamese military history.
- February 4 – George Washington is unanimously elected the first president of the United States, by the United States Electoral College.
- February 21 – King Gustav III enforces the Union and Security Act, delivering the coup de grace to Sweden's 70-year-old parliamentarian system, in favor of absolute monarchy.
- March
  - The first version of a graphic description of a slave ship (the Brookes) is issued on behalf of the English Society for Effecting the Abolition of the Slave Trade.
  - In Southern Africa, the Second Xhosa War between the Xhosa people and European settlers begins.
- March 4 – At Federal Hall in New York City, the 1st United States Congress meets, and declares the new United States Constitution to be in effect. The bicameral United States Congress replaces the unicameral Congress of the Confederation, as the legislature of the federal government of the United States.
- March 10 – In Japan, the Menashi–Kunashir rebellion begins between the Ainu people and Japanese.
- March 11 – The Venetian arsenal on the island of Corfu, containing 72,000 pounds (33,000 kg) of gunpowder and 600 bombshells, explodes during a fire, killing 180 bystanders and knocking down a seawall.

==== April–June ====
- April 1 – At Federal Hall, the United States House of Representatives attains its first quorum, and elects congressman Frederick Muhlenberg as the first Speaker of the House.
- April 6 – At Federal Hall, the United States Senate attains its first quorum, and elects John Langdon of Pennsylvania as its first President pro tempore. Later that day, the Senate and the House of Representatives meet in joint session for the first time, and the electoral votes of the first U.S. Presidential election are counted. General George Washington is certified as President-elect, and John Adams is certified as Vice-President elect.
- April 7 – Selim III (1789–1807) succeeds Abdul Hamid I (1773–1789) as Ottoman Sultan.
- April 21 – John Adams takes office as the first vice president of the United States, and begins presiding over the United States Senate.

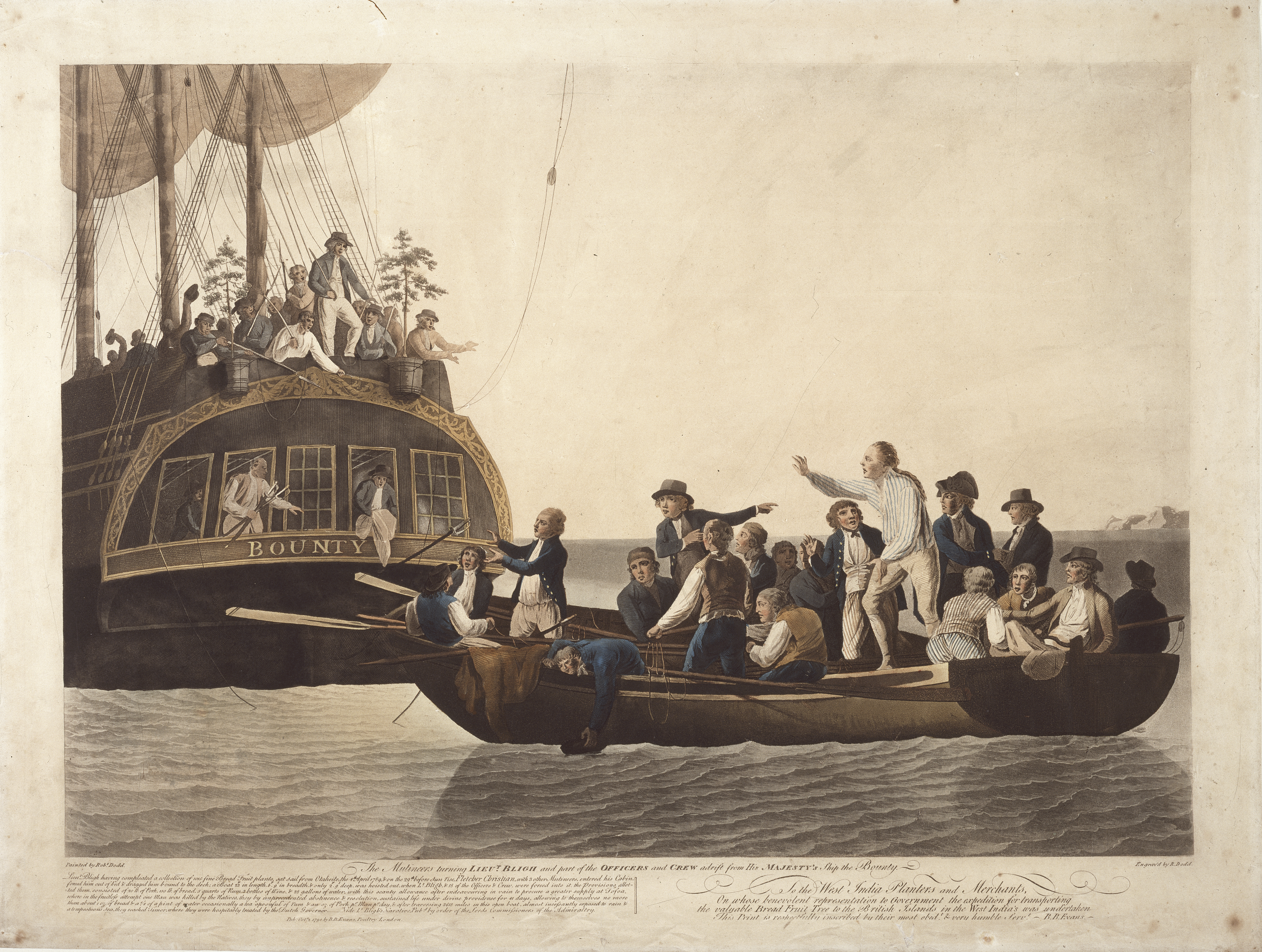
April 28: Mutiny on the Bounty.

- April 28 – Mutiny on the Bounty: Fletcher Christian leads the mutiny on the British Royal Navy ship HMS Bounty against Captain William Bligh, in the Pacific Ocean.

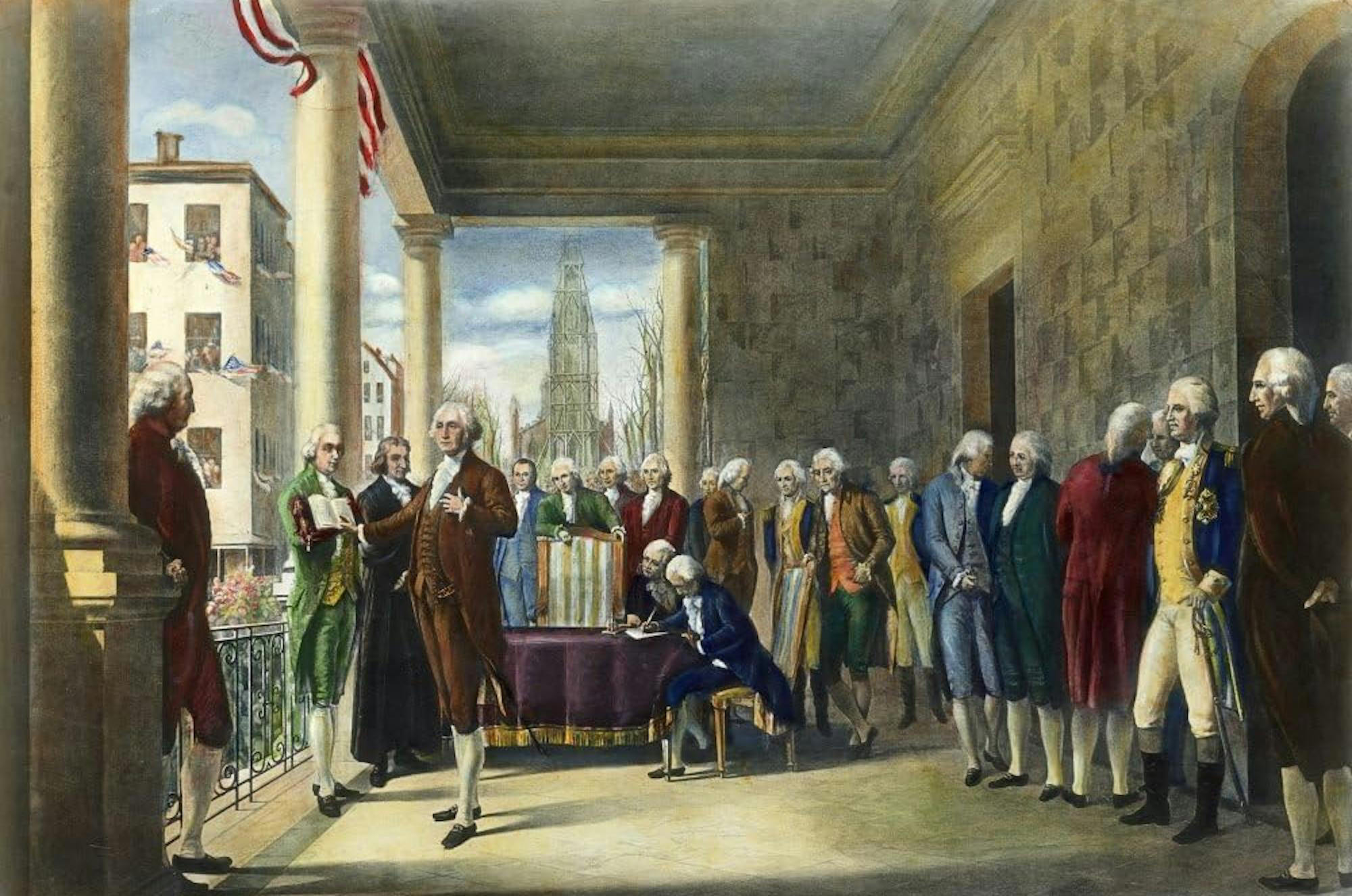
April 30: George Washington, inaugurated as the First President of the United States.

- April 30 – George Washington is inaugurated at Federal Hall in New York City, beginning his term as the first president of the United States.
- May 5 – In France, the Estates-General convenes for the first time in 175 years, taken as the start of the French Revolution (1789–1799).
- June – The Inconfidência Mineira is the first attempt at Brazilian independence from Portugal.
- June 17 – In France, representatives of the Third Estate at the Estates-General declare themselves the National Assembly.
- June 20 – The Tennis Court Oath is taken in Versailles.
- June 23 – Louis XVI of France makes a conciliatory speech urging reforms to a joint session, and orders the three estates to meet together.

==== July–September ====
- July
  - An estimated 150,000 of Paris's 600,000 people are without work.
  - Storofsen flood in Norway.
- July 1 – The comic ballet La fille mal gardée, choreographed by Jean Dauberval, is first presented under the title Le ballet de la paille, at the Grand Théâtre de Bordeaux, at Bordeaux, France.
- July 4 – The U.S. Congress passes its first bill, the Tariff of 1789, setting out tariffs.
- July 9
  - At Versailles, the National Assembly reconstitutes itself as the National Constituent Assembly, and begins preparations for what will become the French Constitution of 1791.
  - The Theatre War officially ends in Scandinavia.
- July 10 – Alexander Mackenzie reaches the Mackenzie River Delta.
- July 11 – Louis XVI of France dismisses popular Chief Minister Jacques Necker.
- July 12 – An angry Parisian crowd, inflamed by a speech from journalist Camille Desmoulins, demonstrates against the King's decision to dismiss Minister Necker.
- July 13 – The people begin to seize arms for the defense of Paris.
- July 14
  - French Revolution: Storming of the Bastille – Citizens of Paris storm the fortress of the Bastille, and free the only seven prisoners held. In rural areas, peasants attack the manors of the nobility.
  - Survivors of the mutiny on the Bounty, including Captain William Bligh and 18 others, reach Timor after a nearly 4,000-mile (6,400 km) journey in an open boat.
- July 27 – The first agency of the Federal government of the United States under the new Constitution, the Department of Foreign Affairs (on September 15 renamed the Department of State), is established.
- August 4 – In France, members of the Constituent Assembly take an oath to end feudalism and abandon their privileges.
- August 7 – The United States Department of War is established.
- August 18 – The Liège Revolution breaks out in the Prince-Bishopric of Liège.
- August 21 – A proposal for a Bill of Rights is adopted by the United States House of Representatives.
- August 24 – The first naval battle of the Svensksund begins in the Gulf of Finland.
- August 26 – The Declaration of the Rights of Man and of the Citizen is proclaimed in France by the Constituent Assembly.
- August 28 – William Herschel discovers Enceladus, one of Saturn's moons.
- September 2 – The United States Department of the Treasury is founded.
- September 11 – Alexander Hamilton is appointed as the first United States Secretary of the Treasury.
- September 22
  - Russo-Turkish War (1787–92) – Battle of Rymnik: Alexander Suvorov roundly defeats 100,000 Turks.
  - The United States Department of the Post Office is established.
- September 24 – The Judiciary Act of 1789 establishes the federal judiciary, and the United States Marshals Service.
- September 25 – The United States Congress proposes a set of 12 amendments to the U.S. Constitution, for ratification by the states. Ratification for 10 of these proposals is completed on December 5, 1791, creating the United States Bill of Rights.
- September 26 – Thomas Jefferson, U.S. Minister to France, is appointed as the first U.S. Secretary of State.
- September 29 – The U.S. Department of War establishes the nation's first regular army, with a strength of several hundred men.

==== October–December ====
- October 5 – Women's March on Versailles: Some 7,000 women march 12 miles (19 km) from Paris to the royal Palace of Versailles to demand action over high bread prices.
- October 10 – Physician Joseph-Ignace Guillotin proposes to the French National Assembly the adoption of more humane and egalitarian forms of capital punishment, including use of the guillotine.
- October 24 – Brabant Revolution: Brabant revolutionaries cross the border from the Dutch Republic into the Austrian Netherlands; the first public reading of the Manifesto of the People of Brabant declares the independence of the Austrian Netherlands.
- October 27 – Battle of Turnhout: The Austrian army is beaten by Brabant revolutionaries.
- November 2 – Decree on the goods of the clergy placed at the disposal of the Nation passed by the National Constituent Assembly.
- November 6 – Pope Pius VI creates the first diocese in the United States at Baltimore, and appoints John Carroll the first Roman Catholic bishop in the United States.
- November 20 – New Jersey ratifies the United States Bill of Rights, the first state to do so.
- November 21 – North Carolina ratifies the United States Constitution, and becomes the 12th U.S. state.
- November 26 – A national Thanksgiving Day is observed in the United States, as recommended by President George Washington and approved by Congress.
- December 11 – The University of North Carolina, the oldest public university in the United States, is founded.
- December 23 – A leaflet circulated in France accuses the Marquis de Favras of plotting to rescue the royal family.

==== Date unknown ====
- Joseph II, Holy Roman Emperor, decrees that all peasant labor obligations be converted into cash payments.
- The Qajar dynasty establish themselves as rulers in Iran.
- The Traité Élémentaire de Chimie (Elementary Treatise of Chemistry), an influential chemistry textbook by Antoine Lavoisier, is published; translated into English in 1790, it comes to be considered the first modern chemical textbook.
- German chemist Martin Heinrich Klaproth discovers the element uranium, while studying the mineral pitchblende.
- The Bengal Presidency first establishes a penal colony, in the Andaman Islands.
- Famine in Ethiopia.
- Thomas Jefferson returns from Europe, bringing the first macaroni machine to the United States.
- Influenced by Benjamin Rush's argument against the excessive use of alcohol, about 200 farmers in a Connecticut community form a temperance movement in the United States.
- Fort Washington (Cincinnati, Ohio) is built to protect early U.S. settlements in the Northwest Territory.
- Former slave Olaudah Equiano's autobiography The Interesting Narrative of the Life of Olaudah Equiano, one of the earliest published works by a black writer, is published in London.
- Peggy of Castletown, Isle of Man, the world's oldest surviving private yacht, is built.
- The pedal-powered tricycle is invented by two Frenchmen, Blanchard and Maguier.

== Births ==
1780

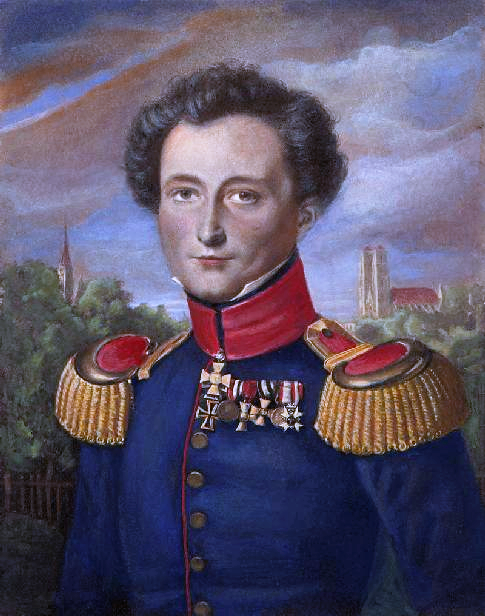
Carl von Clausewitz

- January 13 – Pierre Jean Robiquet, French chemist (d. 1840)
- January 14 – Henry Baldwin, Associate Justice of the Supreme Court of the United States (d. 1844)
- February 1 – David Porter, American naval officer (d. 1843)
- February 2 – Johannes van den Bosch, Governor-General of the Dutch East Indies (d. 1844)
- February 3 – Mihail G. Boiagi, Aromanian grammarian and professor (d. uncertain)
- February 19 – Richard McCarty, American politician (d. 1844)
- February 25 – John Sumner, Archbishop of Canterbury (d. 1862)
- February 28 – Leonard du Bus de Gisignies, Governor-General of the Dutch East Indies (d. 1849)
- March 25 – Joseph Ritner, American politician (d. 1869)
- March 29 – Jørgen Jørgensen, Danish adventurer (d. 1841)
- April 7 – William Ellery Channing, influential American Unitarian theologian and minister (d. 1842)
- April 26 – Gotthilf Heinrich von Schubert, German naturalist (d. 1860)
- April 29 – Charles Nodier, French author (d. 1844)
- May 1 – John McKinley, American politician, Associate Justice of the Supreme Court of the United States (d. 1852)
- May 21 – Elizabeth Fry, British humanitarian (d. 1845)
- May 29 – Henri Braconnot, French chemist, pharmacist (d. 1855)
- June 1 – Carl von Clausewitz, Prussian military strategist (d. 1831)
- July 4 – Sofia Hjärne, Finnish baroness, writer (d. 1860)
- July 5 – François Carlo Antommarchi, French physician (d. 1838)
- July 15 – Emilie Petersen, Swedish philanthropist (d. 1859)
- July 27 – Anastasio Bustamante, 4th President of Mexico (d. 1853)
- August 29
  - Jean-Auguste-Dominique Ingres, French painter (d. 1867)
  - Richard Rush, United States Attorney General under James Madison, United States Secretary of the Treasury under President John Quincy Adams (d. 1859)
- October 20 – Pauline Bonaparte, Italian noblewoman (d. 1825)
- October 28 – Ernst Anschütz, German teacher, organist, poet, and composer (d. 1861)
- November 13 – Ranjit Singh, Maharaja of The Punjab (Sikh Empire), (d. 1839)
- December 13 – Johann Wolfgang Döbereiner, German chemist (d. 1849)
- December 26 – Mary Fairfax Somerville, British mathematician (d. 1872)
- James Justinian Morier, British diplomat and novelist (d. 1849)
- Manuela Medina, Mexican national heroine (d. 1822)
- Elizabeth Philpot, British paleontologist (d. 1857)
- Jahonotin Uvaysiy, Uzbek Sufi poet (d. 1845)

1781

- January 26 – Achim von Arnim, German novelist and poet (d. 1831)
- January 30 – Adelbert von Chamisso, German poet and scientist (d. 1838)
- February 17 – René Laennec, French physician and inventor (d. 1826)
- March 1 – Javiera Carrera, Chilean independence campaigner (d. 1862)
- March 4 – Rebecca Gratz, American educator, philanthropist (d. 1869)
- March 13 – Karl Friedrich Schinkel, German architect, painter (d. 1841)
- March 17 – Dominique Jacques de Eerens, Governor general of the dutch east indies (d. 1840)

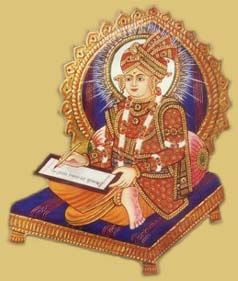
Swaminarayan

- April 3 – Swaminarayan, Indian Hindu reformer and deity (d. 1830)
- May 9 – Henri Cassini, French botanist and naturalist (d. 1832)

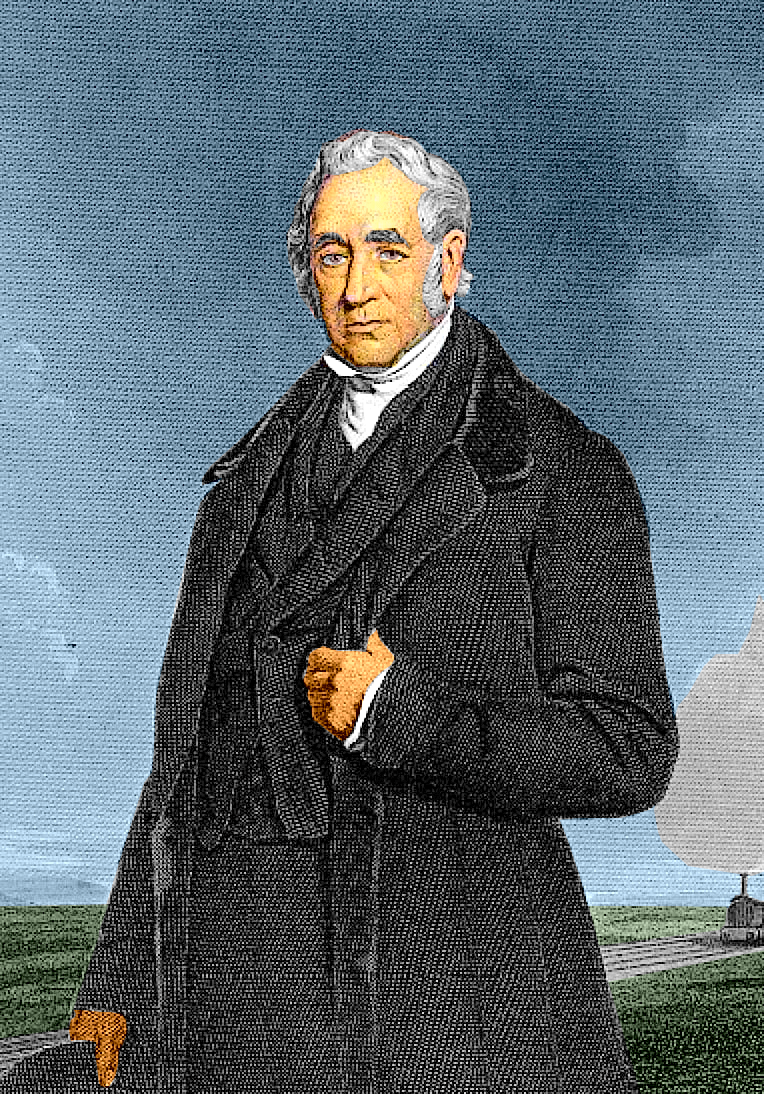
George Stephenson

- June 9 – George Stephenson, English engineer, designer of railway locomotives Locomotion No. 1, Rocket (d. 1848)
- June 21 – Siméon Denis Poisson, French mathematician, physicist (d. 1840)
- July 6
  - Stamford Raffles, English founder of Singapore (d. 1826)
  - John D. Sloat, American naval officer (d. 1867)
- July 27 – Mauro Giuliani, Italian composer (d. 1829)
- September 3 – Eugène de Beauharnais, French nobleman, son of Napoleon's wife Joséphine (d. 1824)
- September 5 – Anton Diabelli, Austrian music publisher, editor and composer (d. 1858)
- October 5 – Bernard Bolzano, Czech philosopher and mathematician (d. 1848)
- October 22 – Louis Joseph, Dauphin of France (d. 1789)
- November 1 – Joseph Karl Stieler, German painter (d. 1858)
- November 6
  - Lucy Aikin, English writer (d. 1864)
  - Maha Bandula, Commander-in-chief of the Burmese military forces (d. 1825)
- November 20 – Karl Friedrich Eichhorn, German jurist (d. 1854)
- November 29 – Andrés Bello, Venezuelan poet, lawmaker, teacher, philosopher, sociologist (d. 1865)
- November 30 – Alexander Berry, Scottish adventurer, Australian pioneer (d. 1873)
- December 11 – Sir David Brewster, Scottish physicist (d. 1868)
- Sanité Bélair, Haitian national heroine (d. 1802)
- Haji Shariatullah, Bengali Islamic scholar (d. 1840)
- William Williams of Wern, Welsh minister (d. 1840)

1782

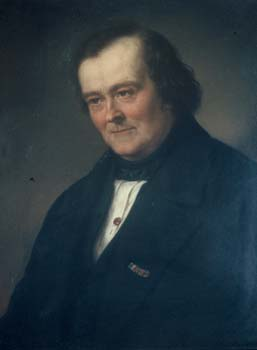
Philipp Franz von Walther born 3 January

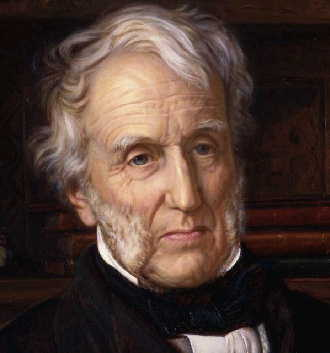
Stephen Lushington born 14 January

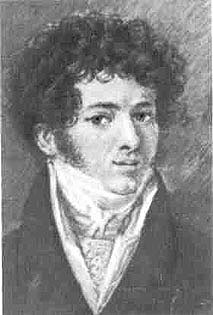
Afanasy Grigoriev born 21 January

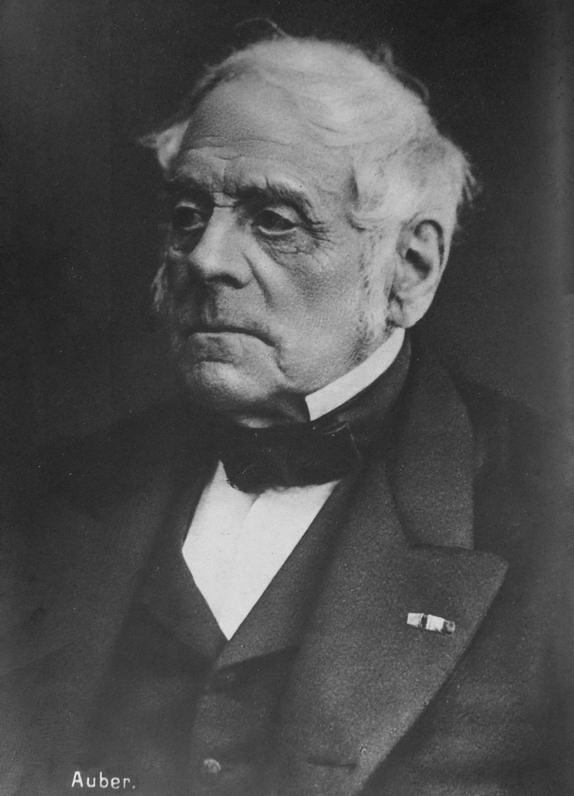
Daniel Auber born 29 January

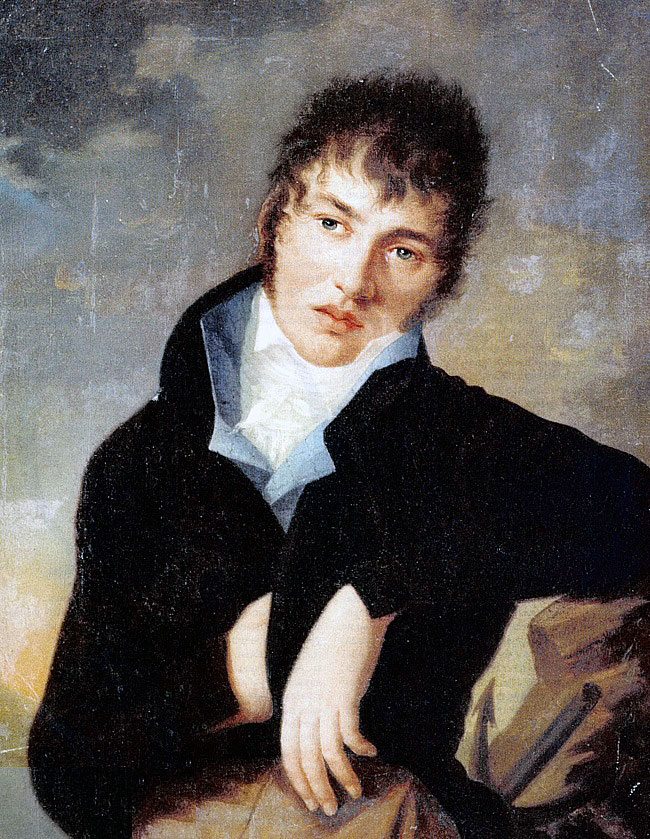
Fyodor Tolstoy born 6 February

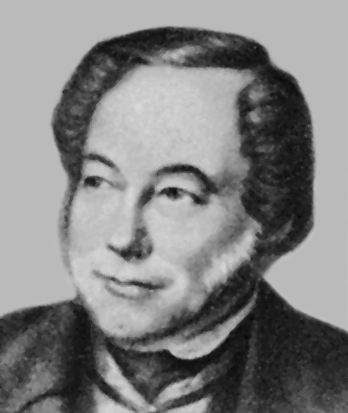
Friedrich Ernst Ludwig von Fischer born 8 February

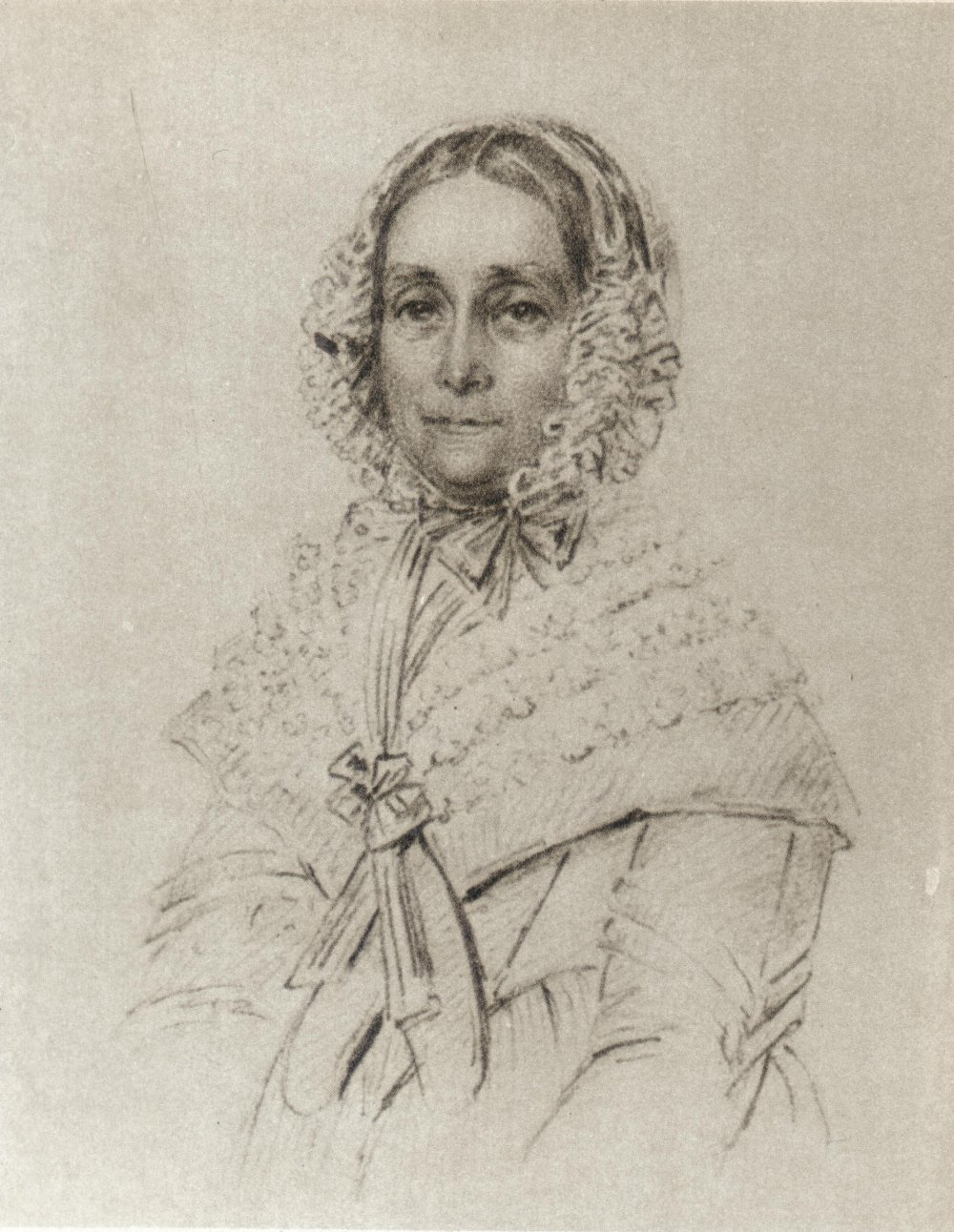
Malla Silfverstolpe born 8 February

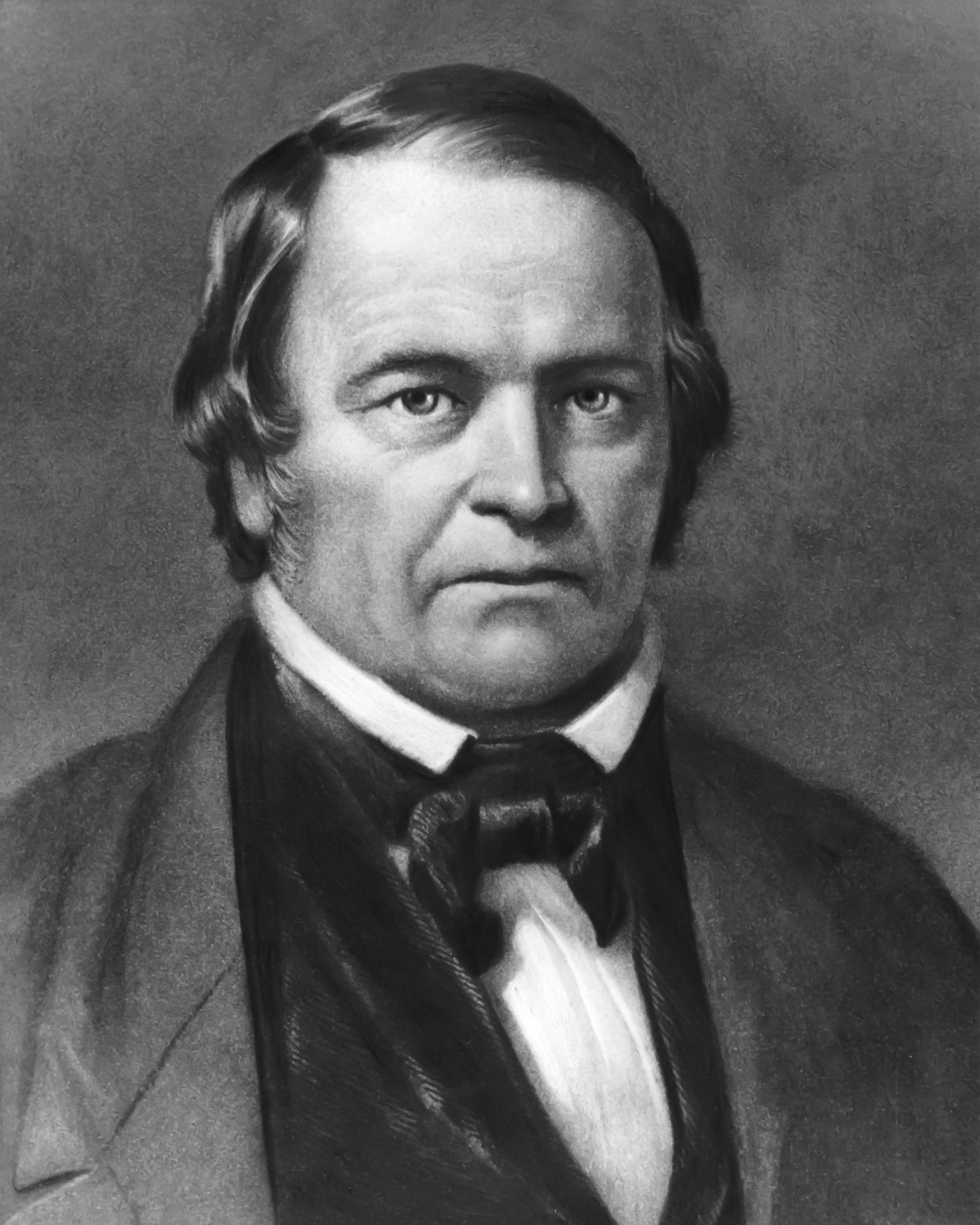
William Miller born 15 February

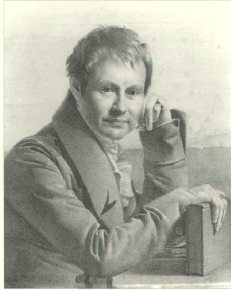
Johann Baptist Emanuel Pohl born 23 February

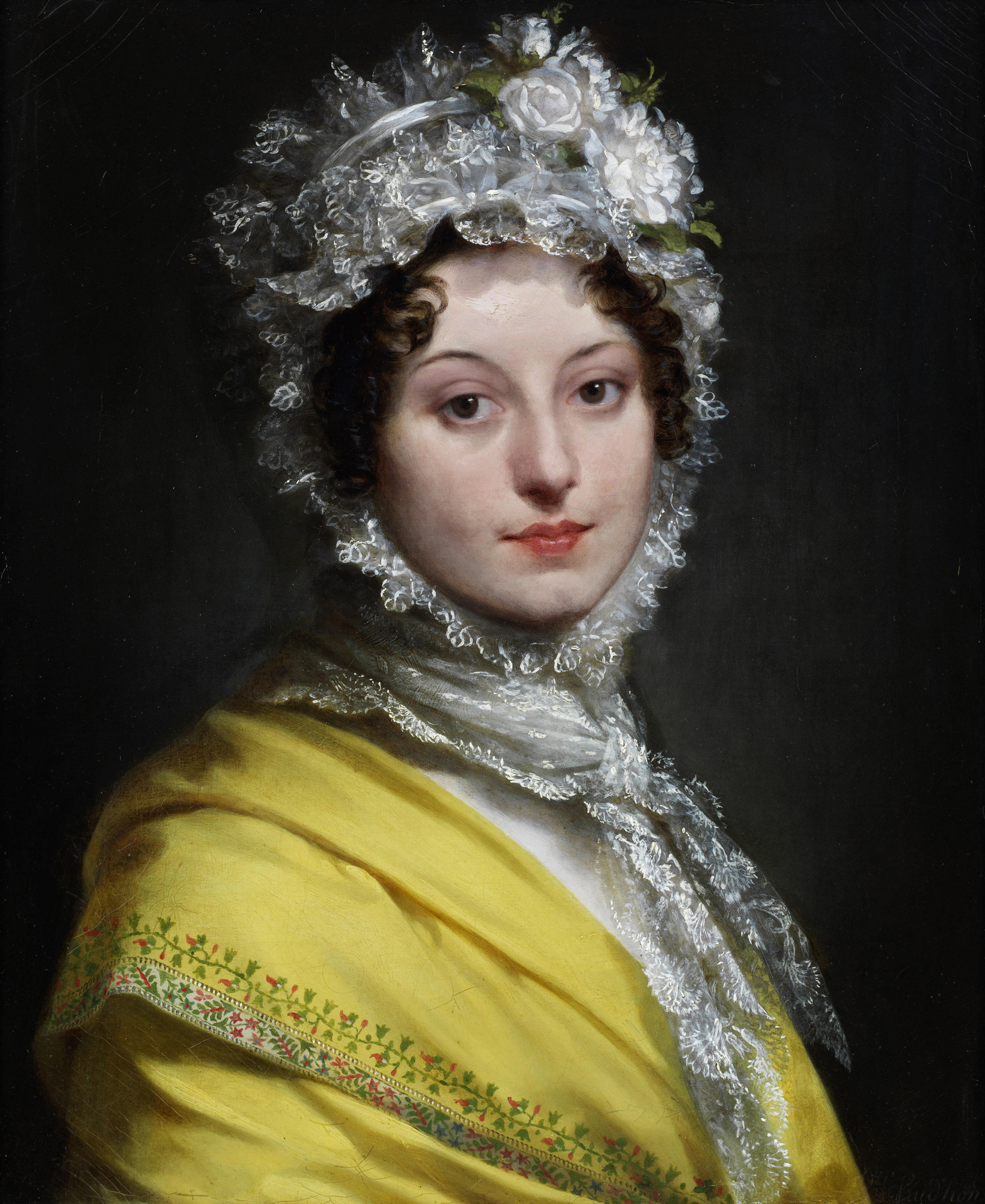
Louise Antoinette Lannes born 26 February

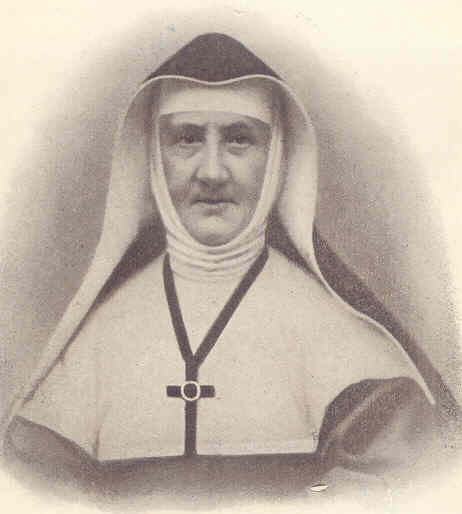
Marie Thérèse Haze born 27 February

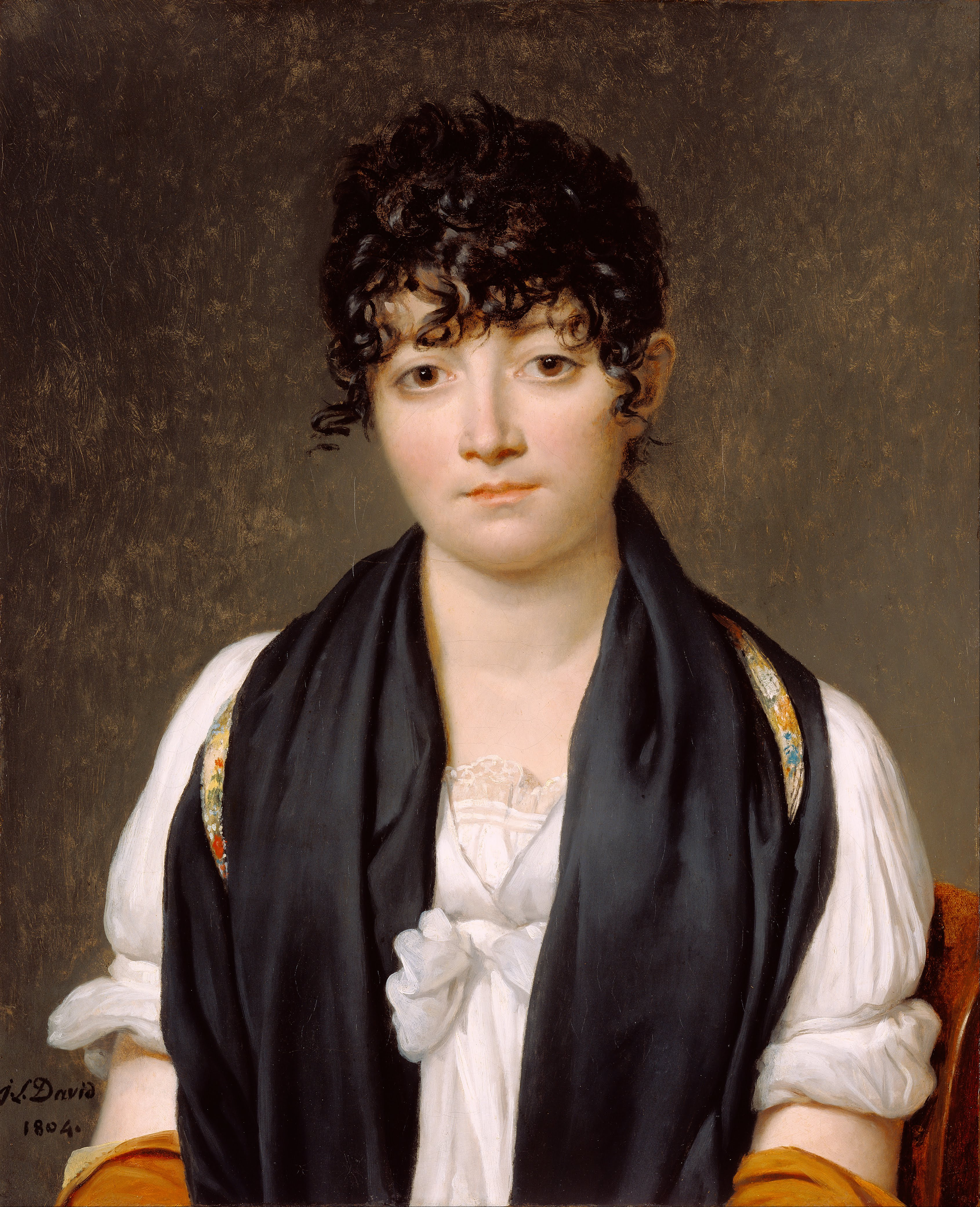
Suzanne le Peletier de Saint-Fargeau born 1 March

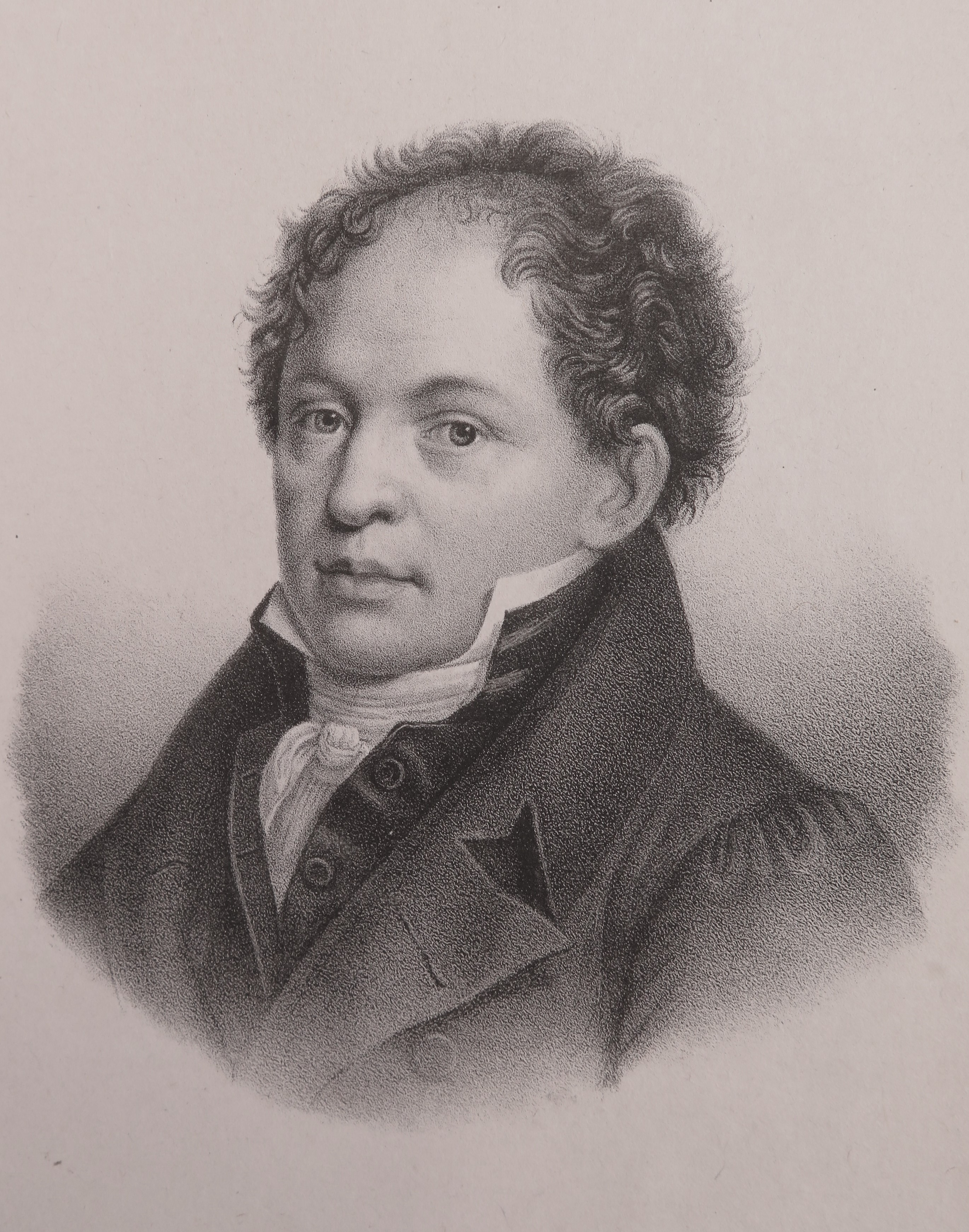
Johann Rudolf Wyss born 4 March

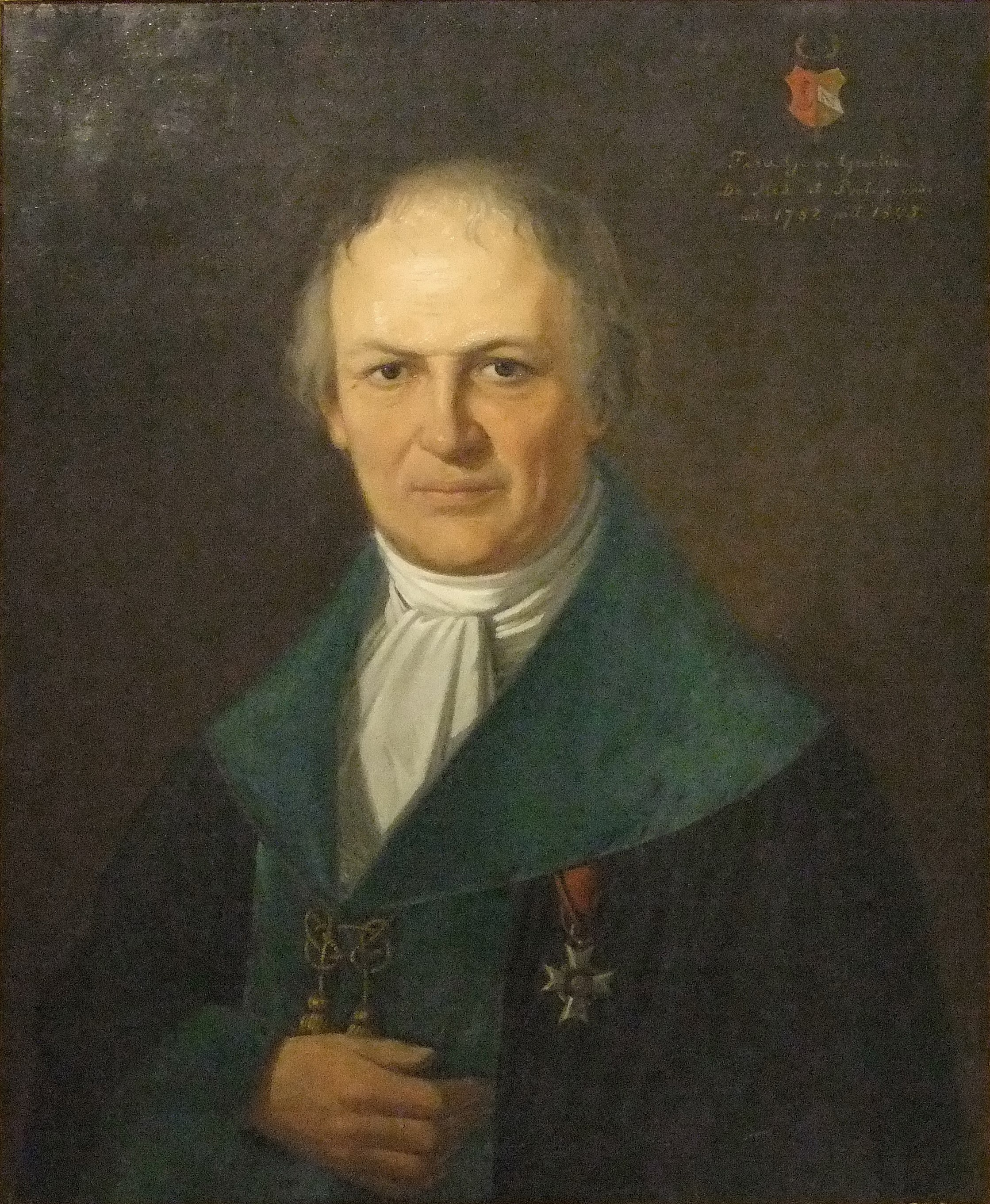
Ferdinand Gottlieb von Gmelin born 10 March

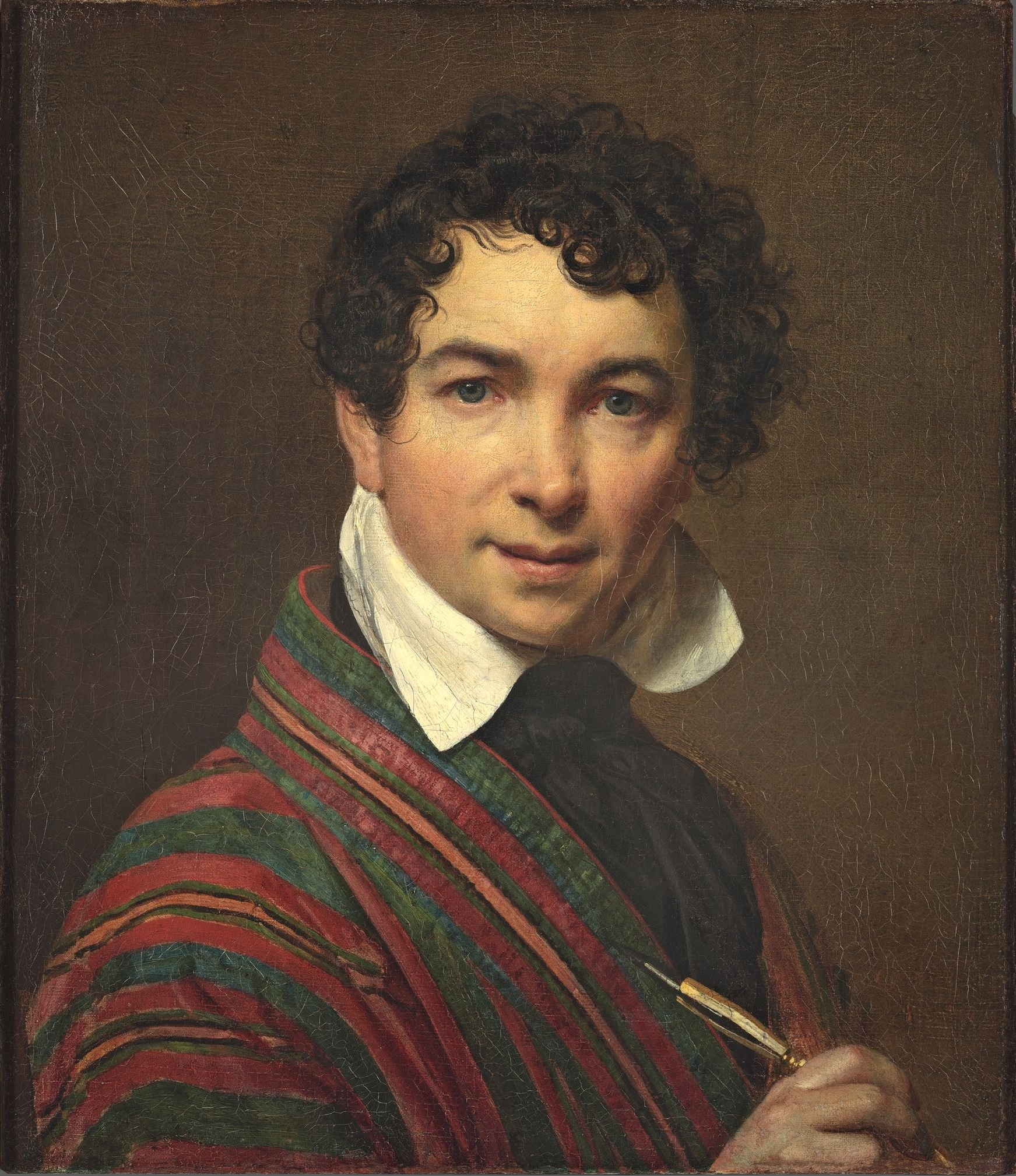
Orest Kiprensky born 13 March

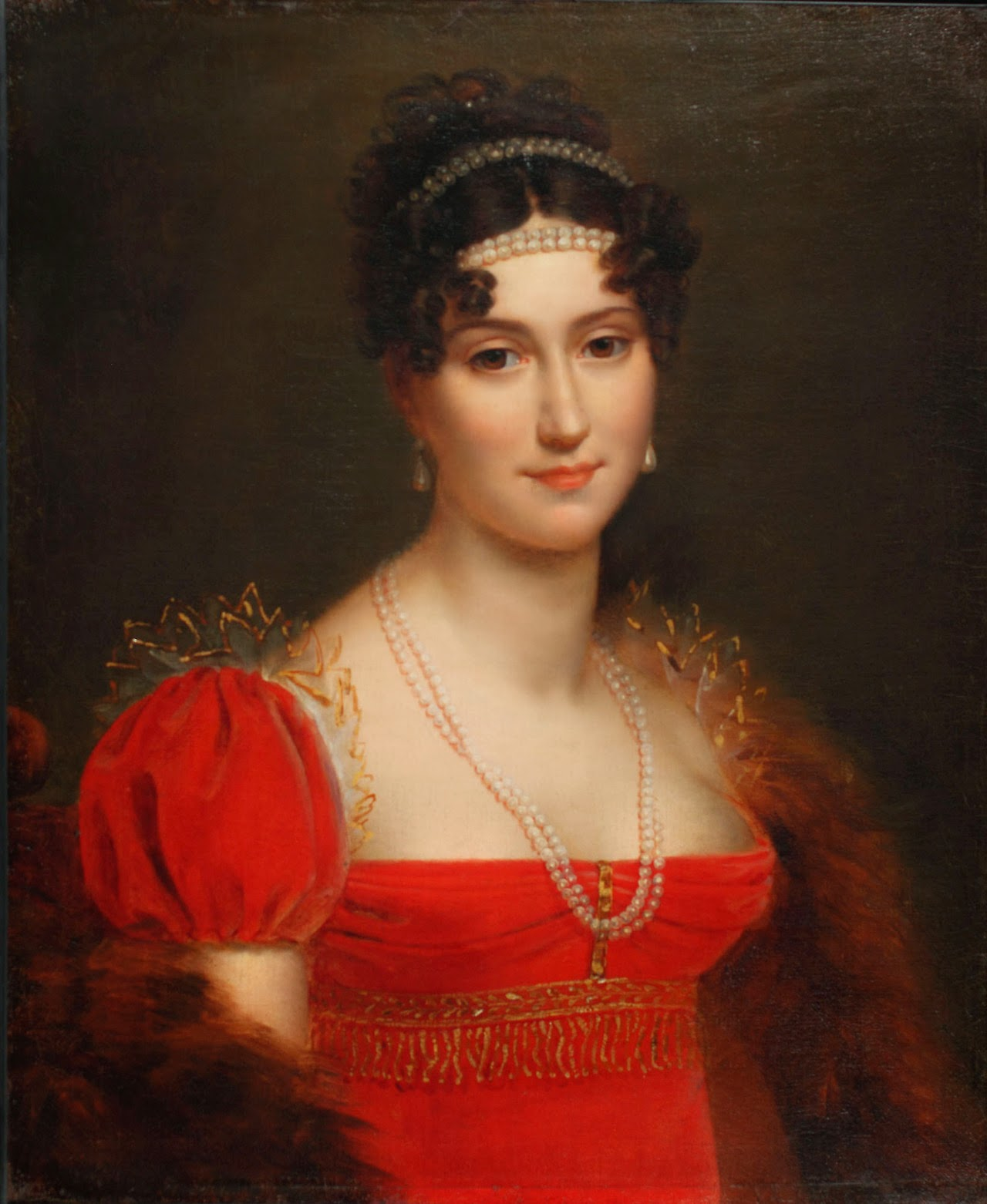
Aglaé Auguié born 24 March

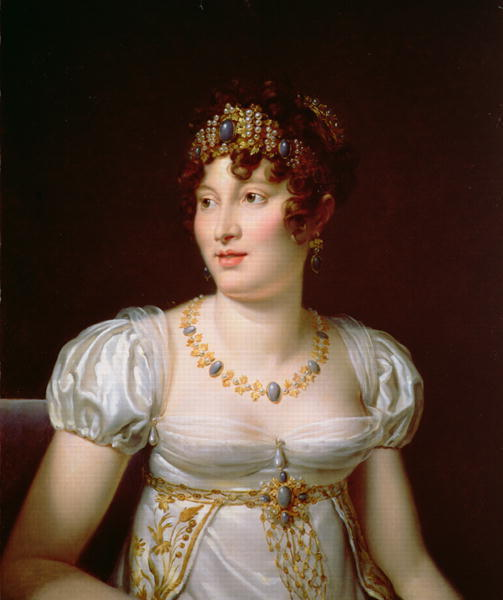
Caroline Bonaparte born 25 March

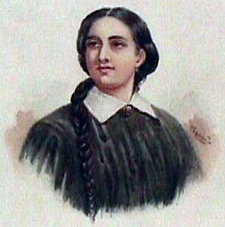
María Antonia Santos Plata born 10 April

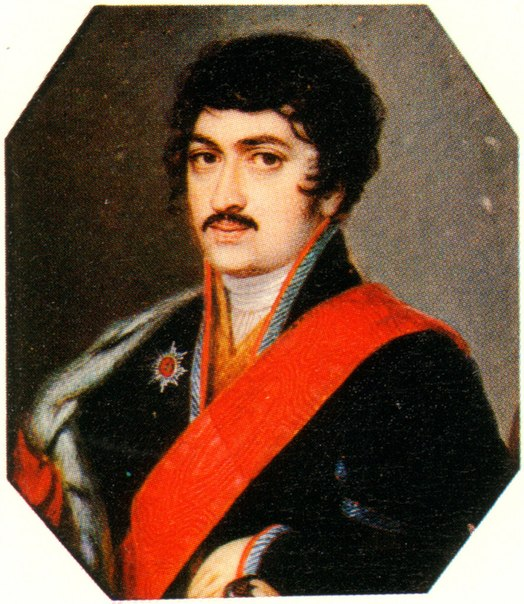
Prince Teimuraz of Georgia born 23 April

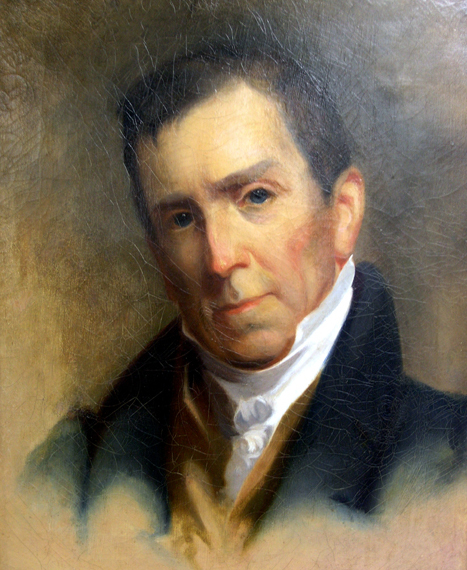
William Darlington born 28 April

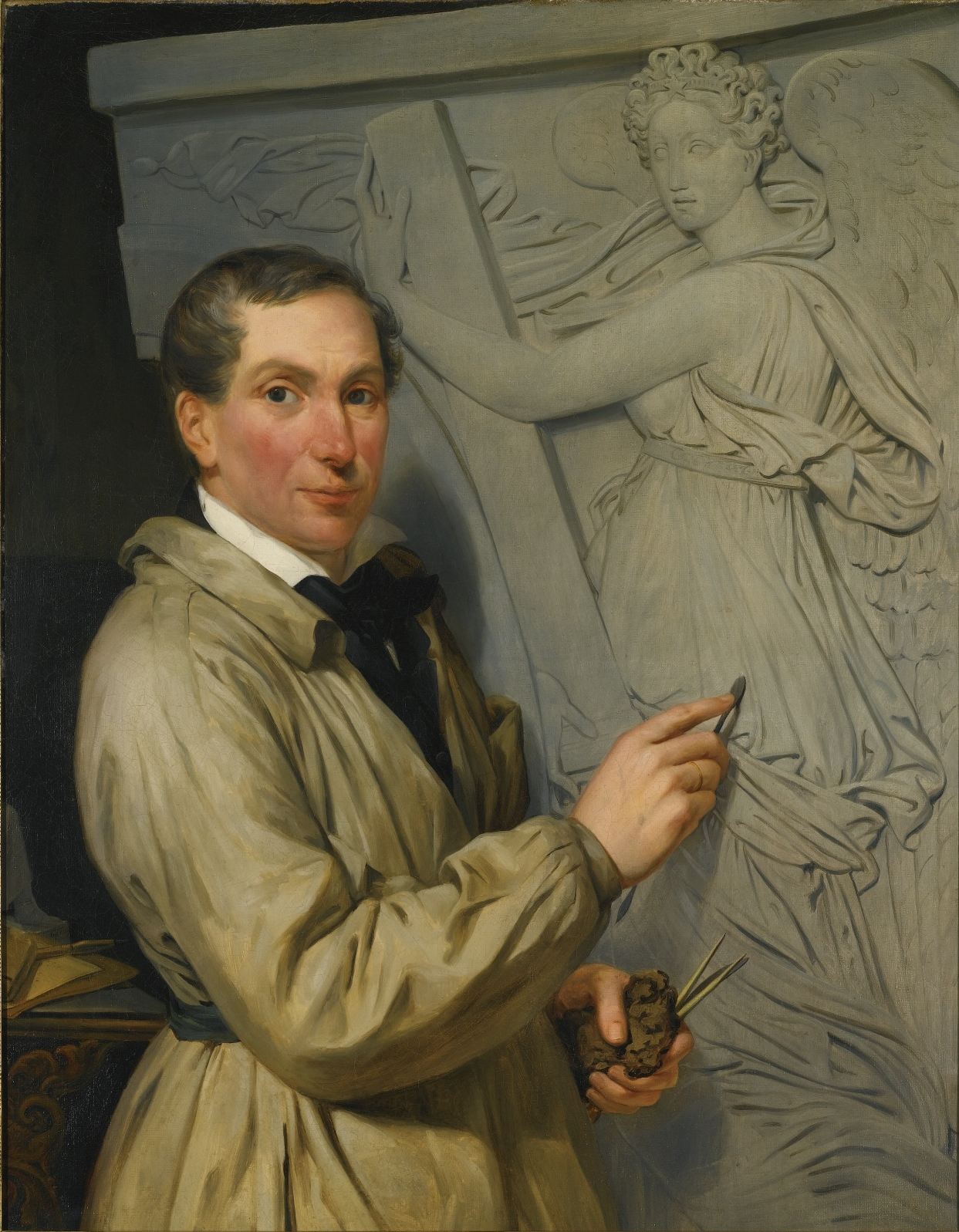
Charles-René Laitié born 6 May

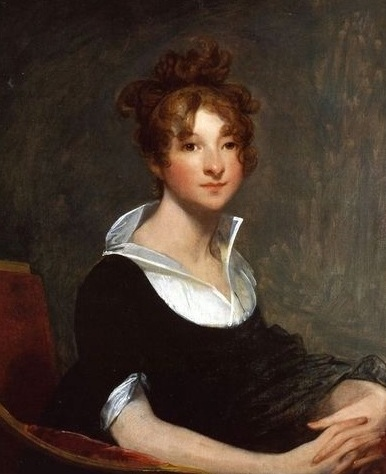
Marcia Van Ness born 9 May

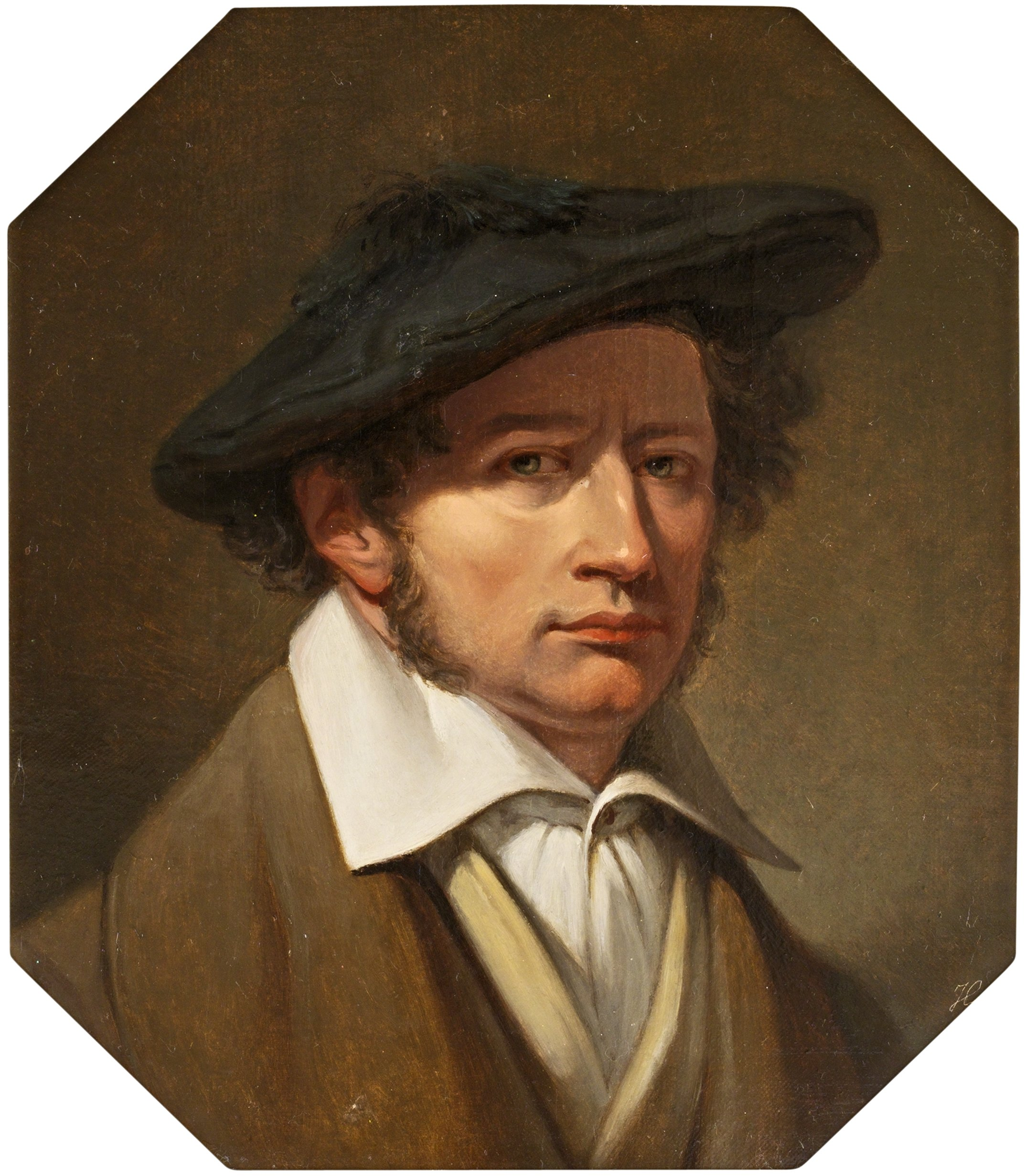
Johan Gustaf Sandberg born 13 May

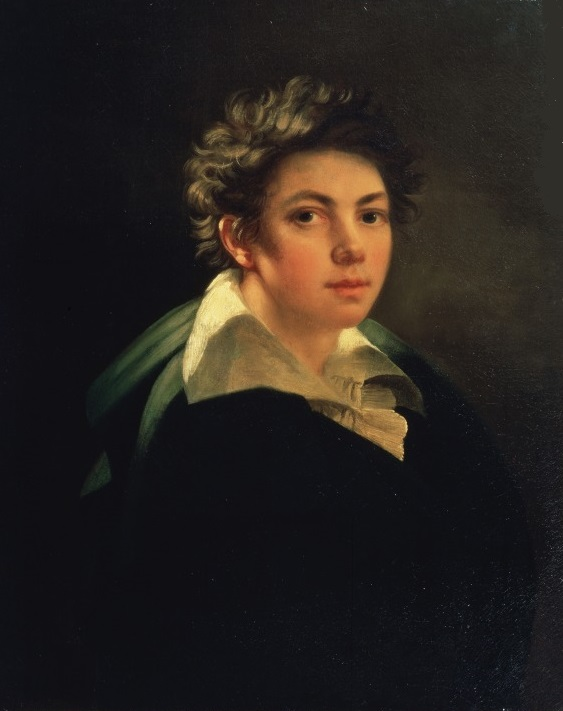
Johann Rombauer born 28 May

Charles Waterton born 3 June

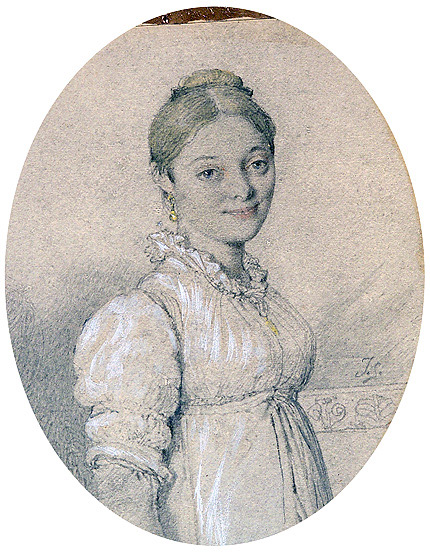
Marie-Anne-Julie Forestier born 13 June

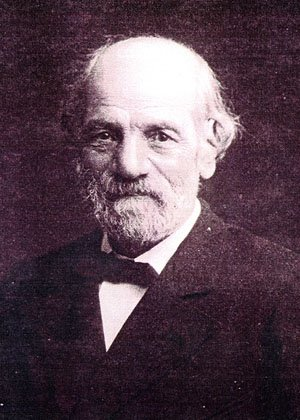
Olry Terquem born 16 June

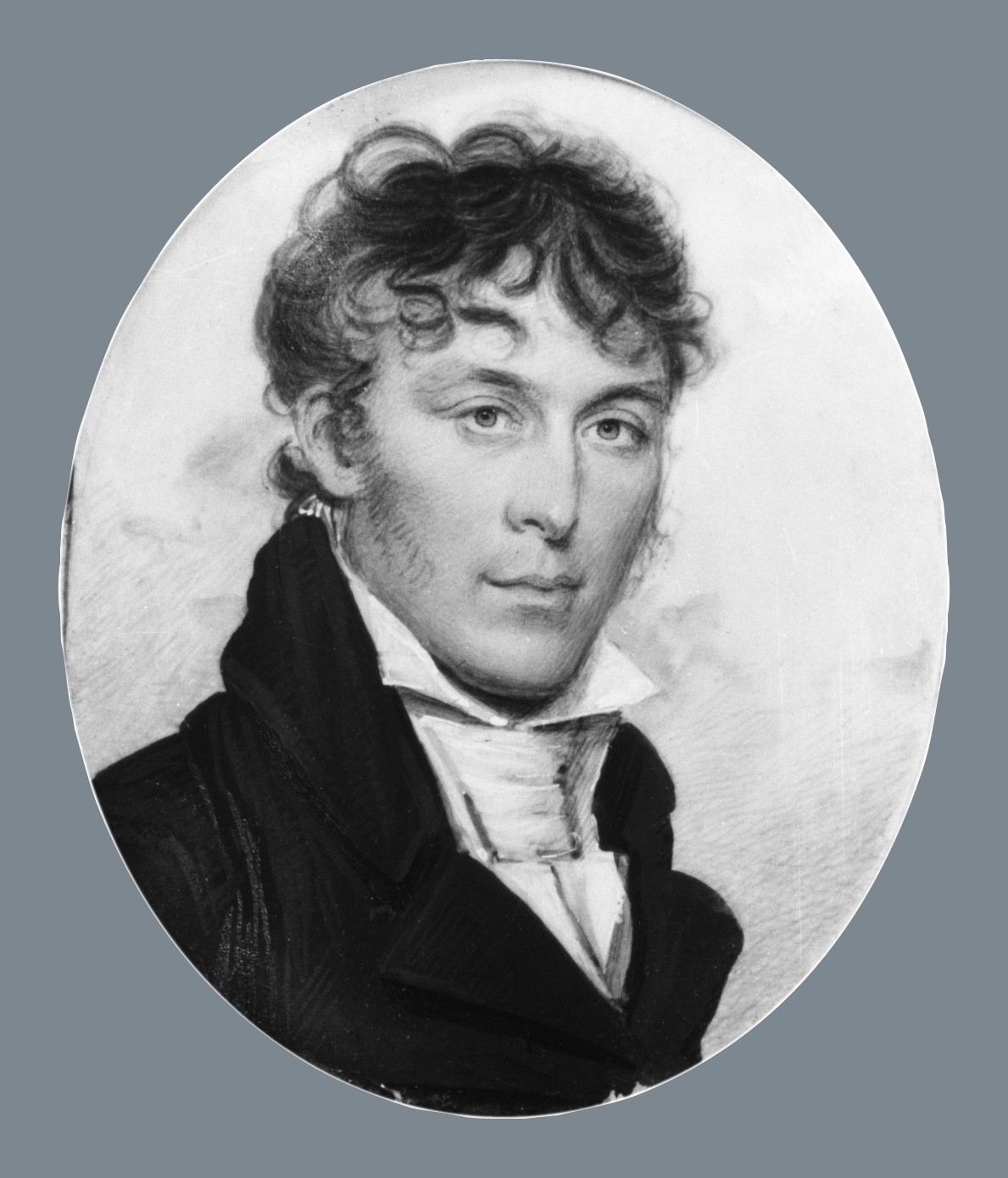
Charles Floyd born 20 June

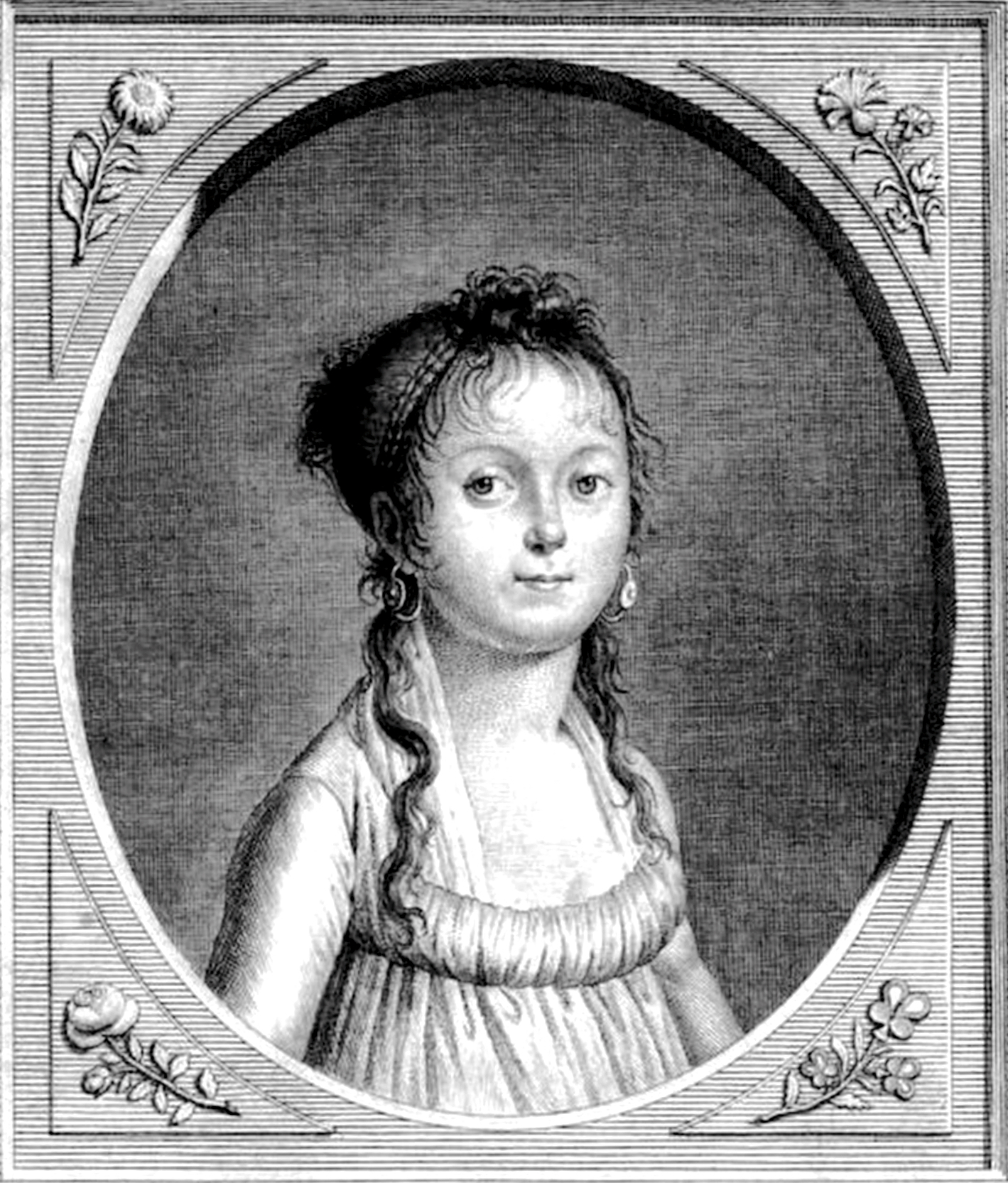
Fortunée Briquet born 26 June

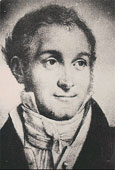
Pierre Berthier born 3 July

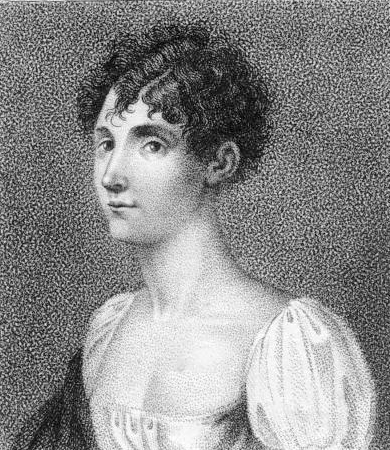
Rosa Morandi born 5 July

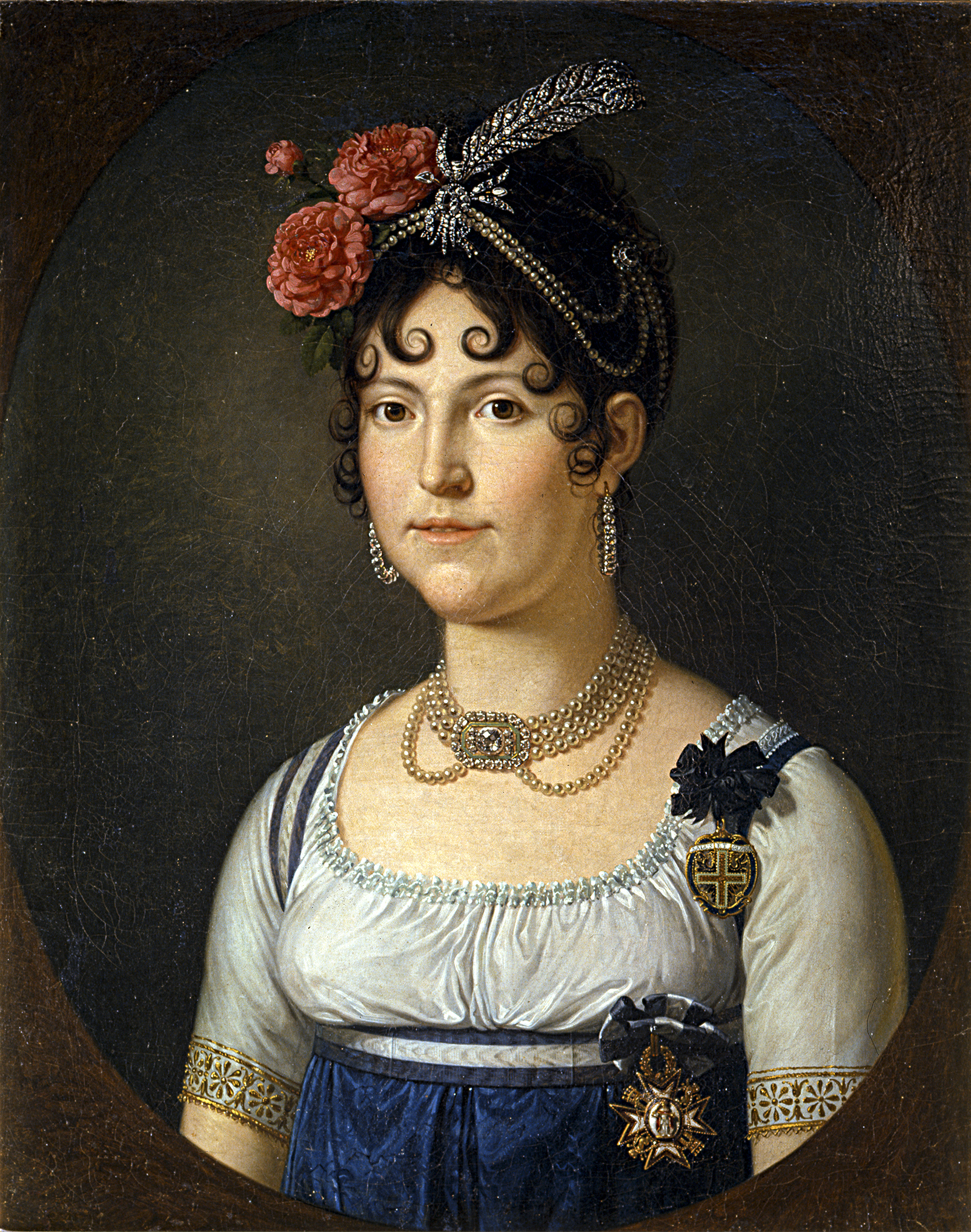
Maria Luisa, Duchess of Lucca born 6 July

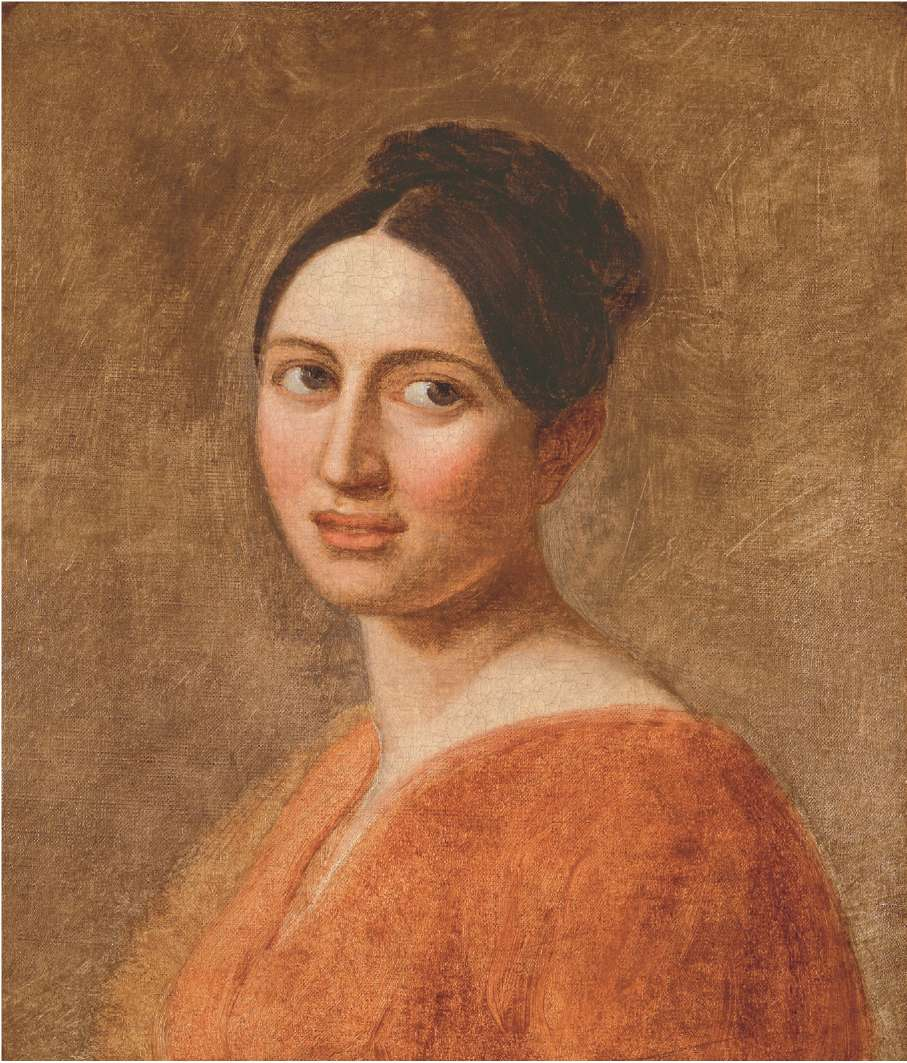
Sophie Ørsted born 16 July

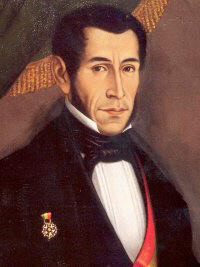
Mariano Enrique Calvo born 18 July

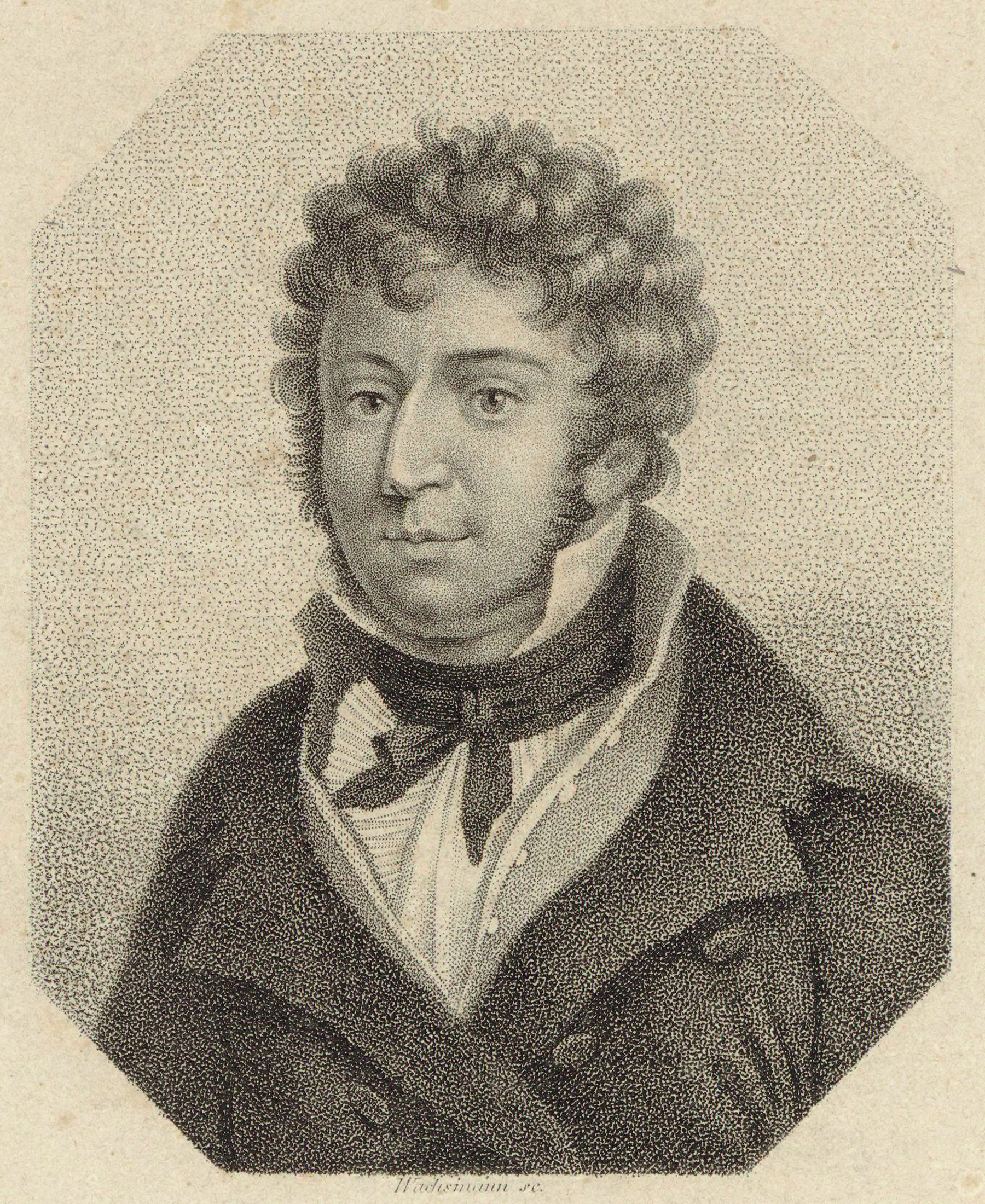
John Field born 26 July

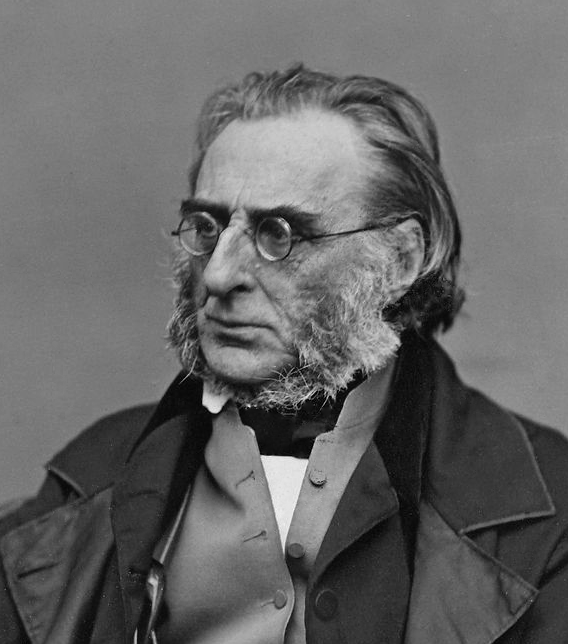
Charles James Napier born 10 August

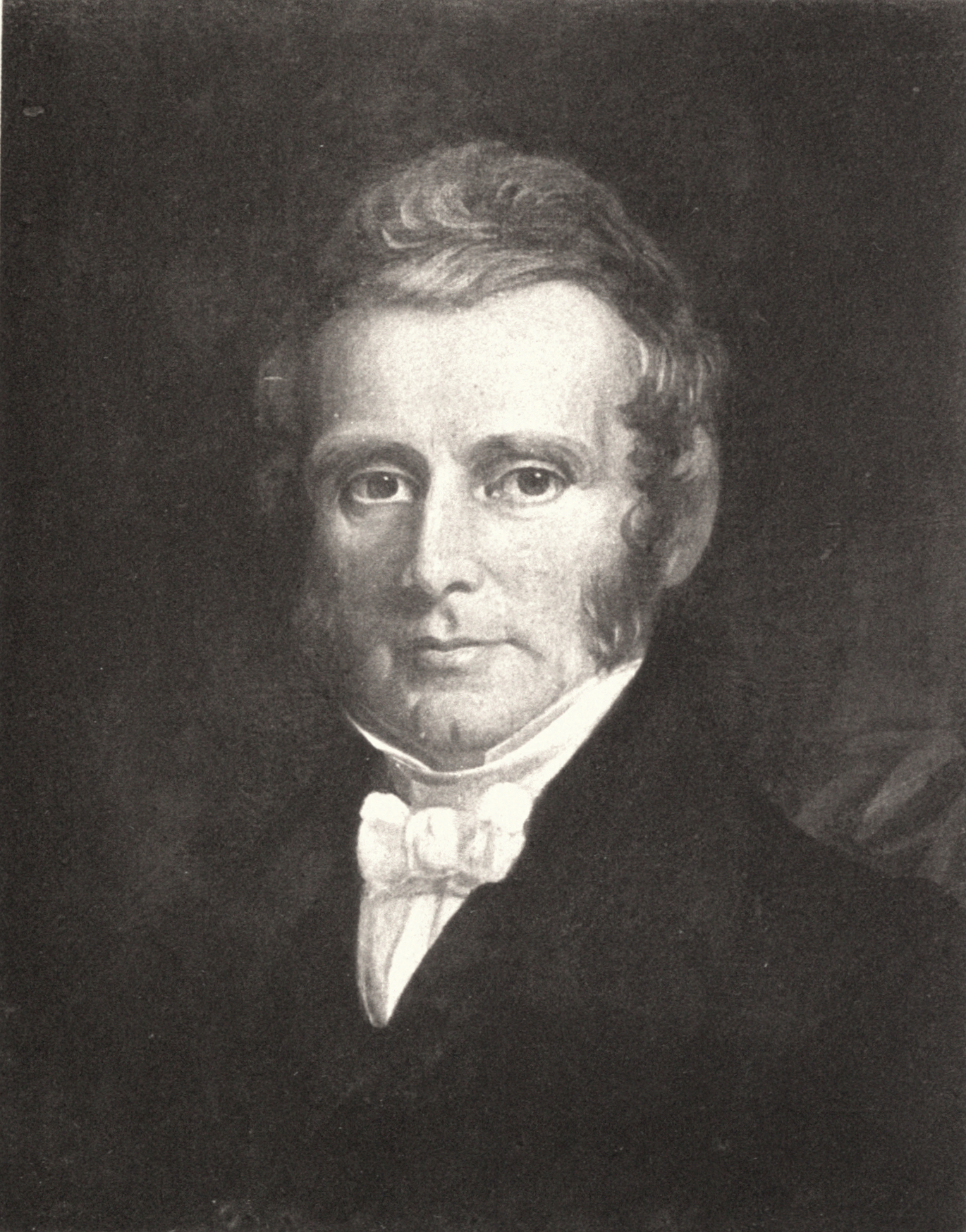
Charles Lowell born 15 August

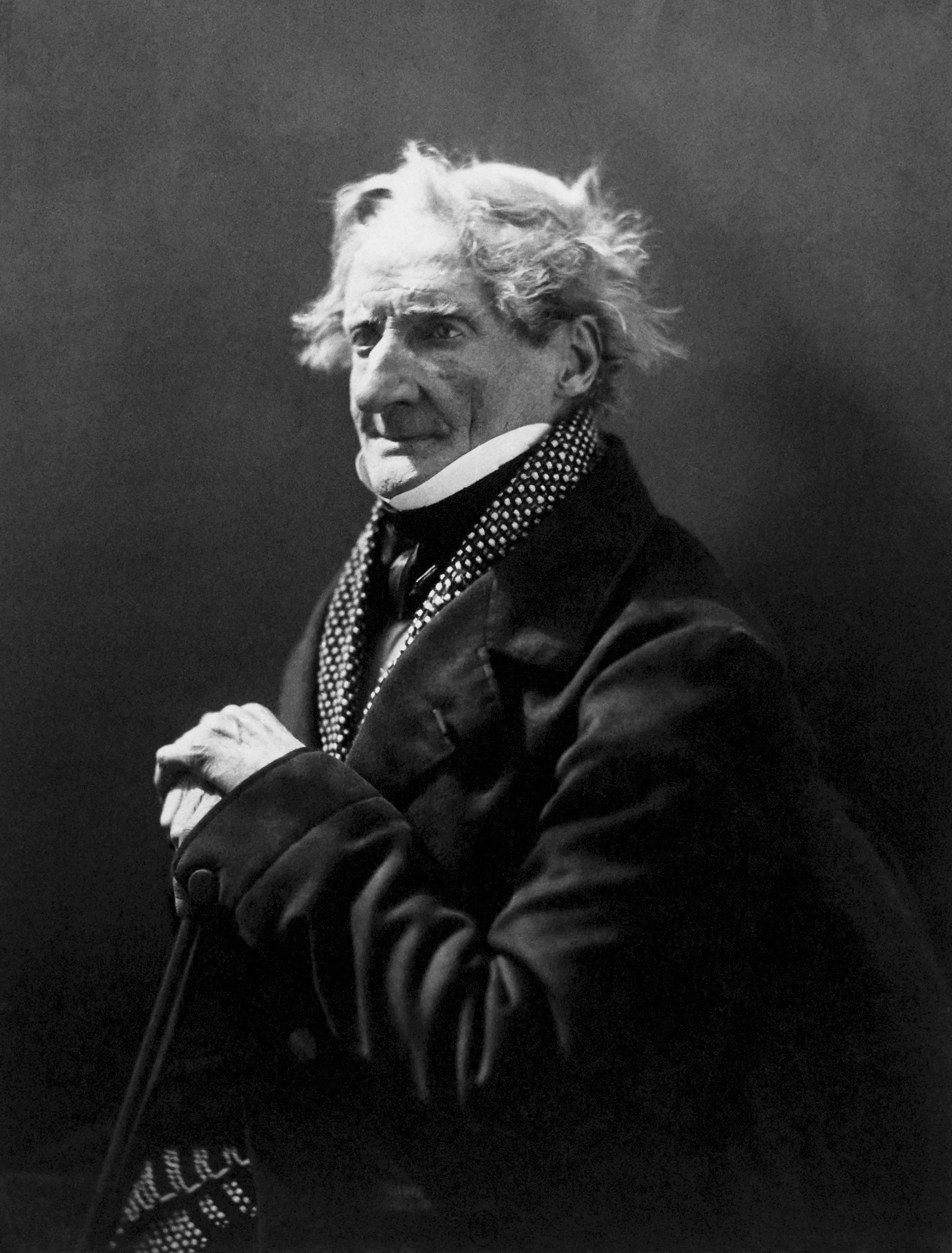
Pierre-Luc-Charles Cicéri born 17 August

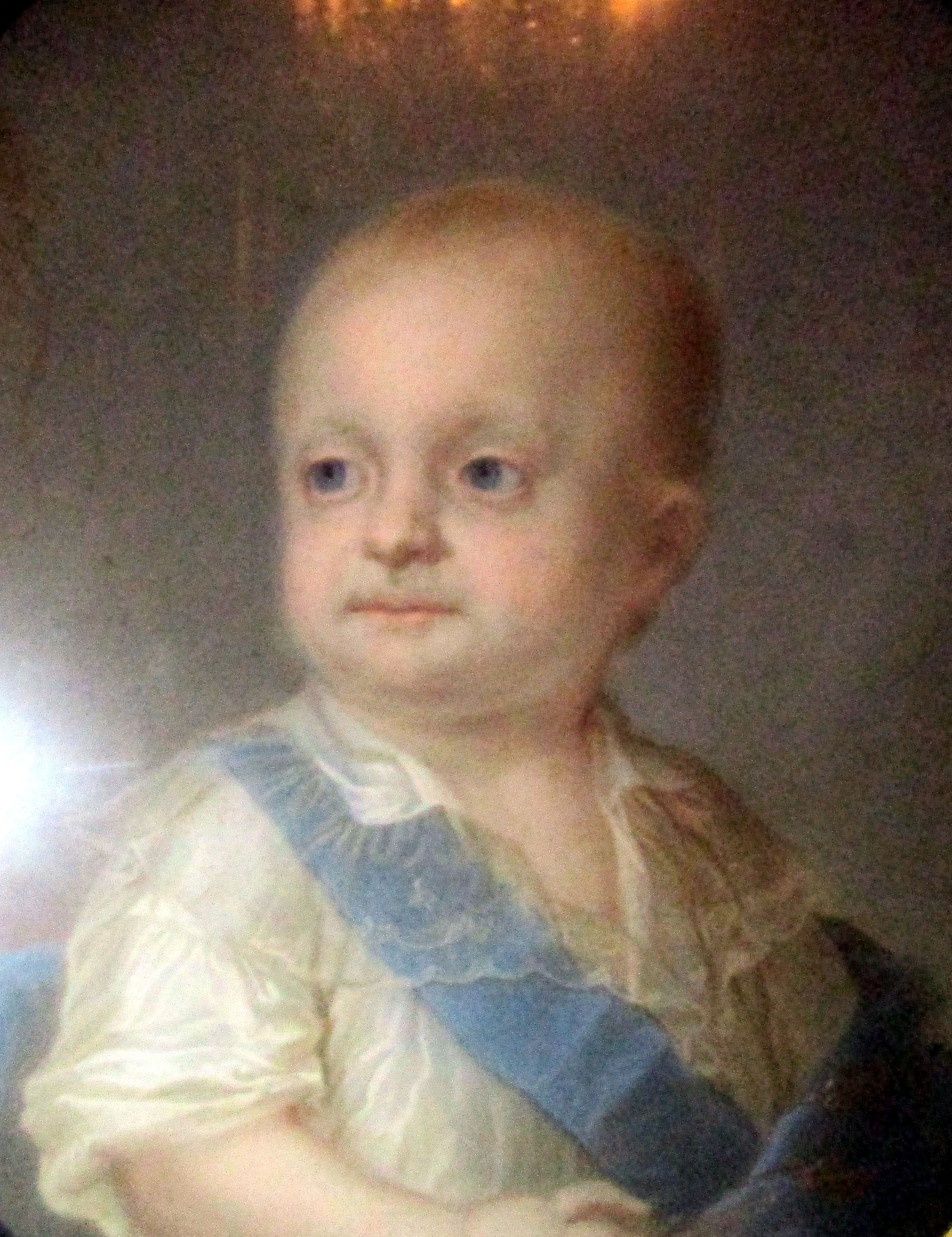
Prince Carl Gustav, Duke of Småland born 25 August

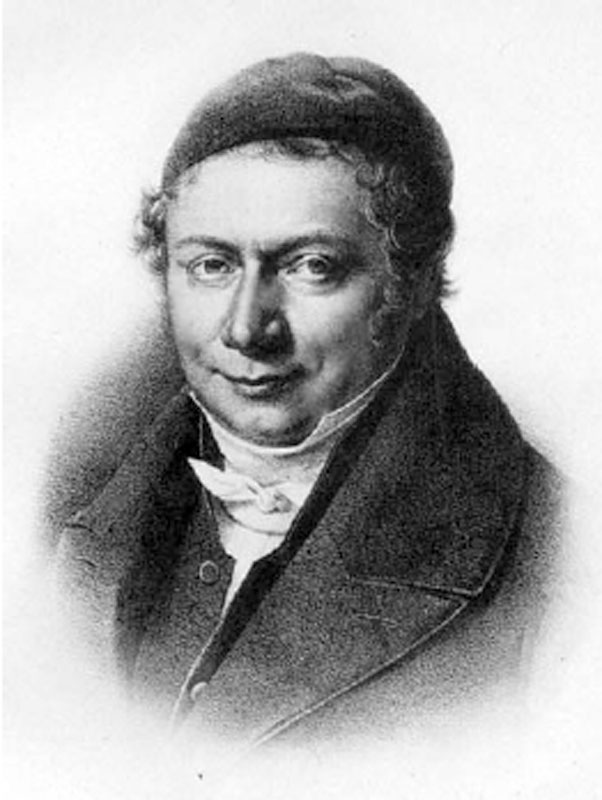
Christian Ludwig Nitzsch born 3 September

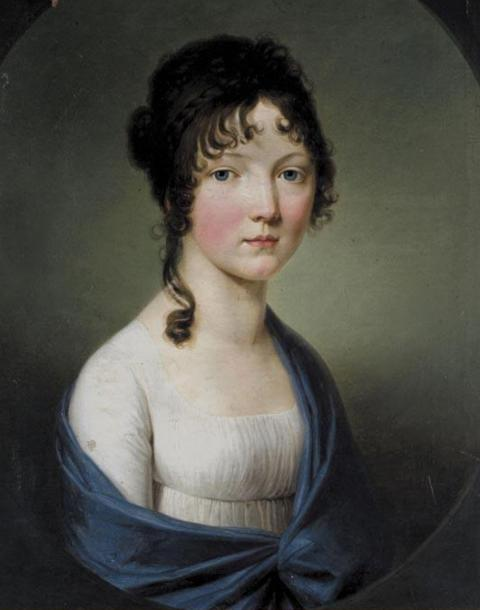
Marie of Baden born 7 September

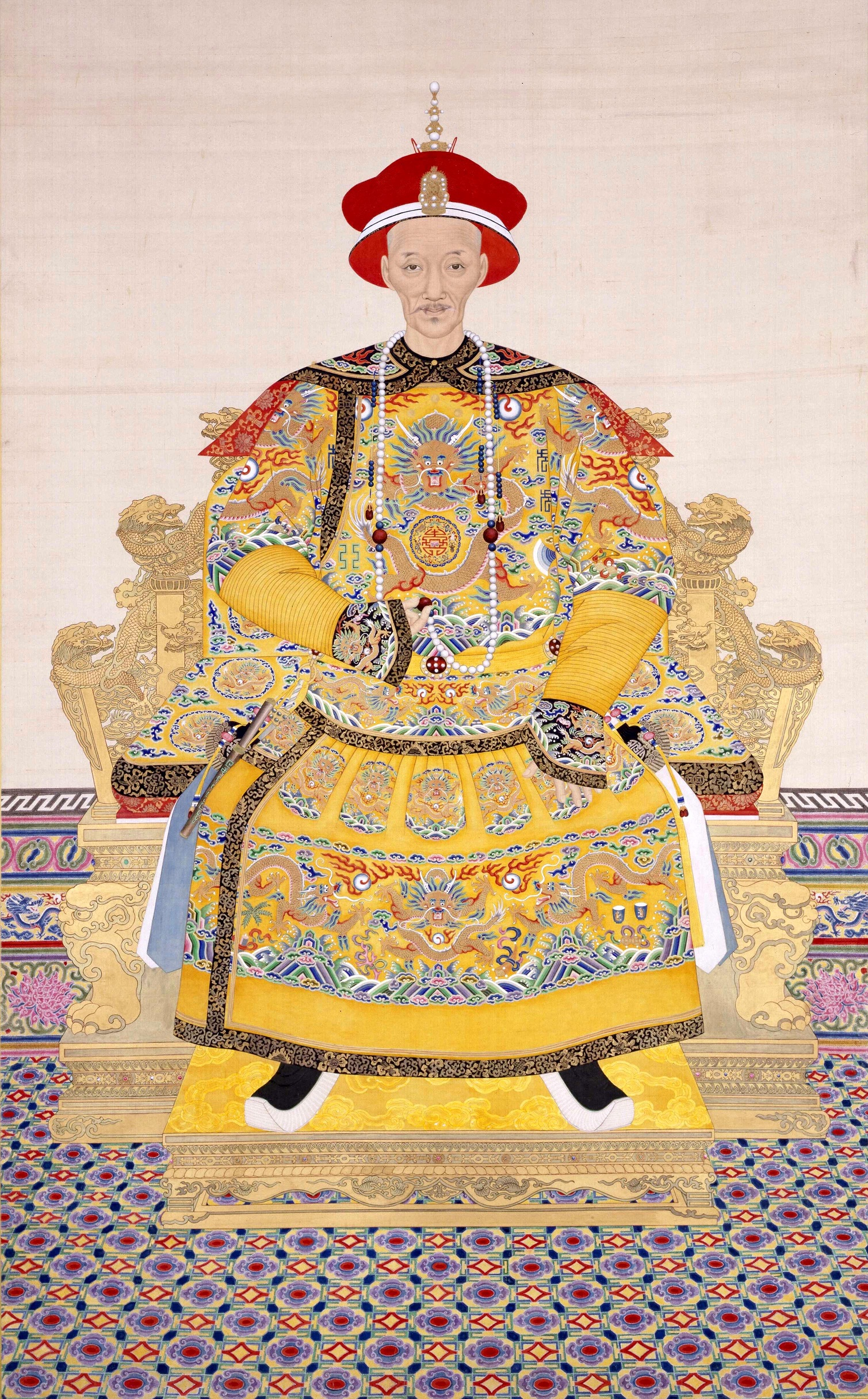
Daoguang Emperor born 16 September

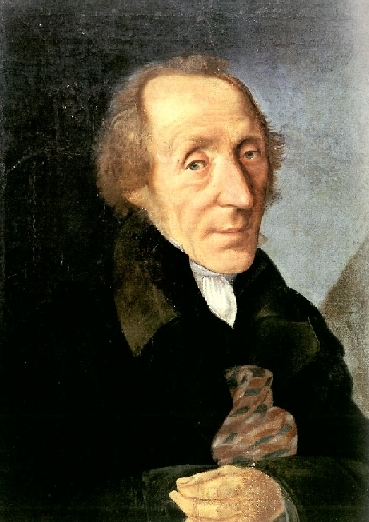
Christoph Hawich born 17 September

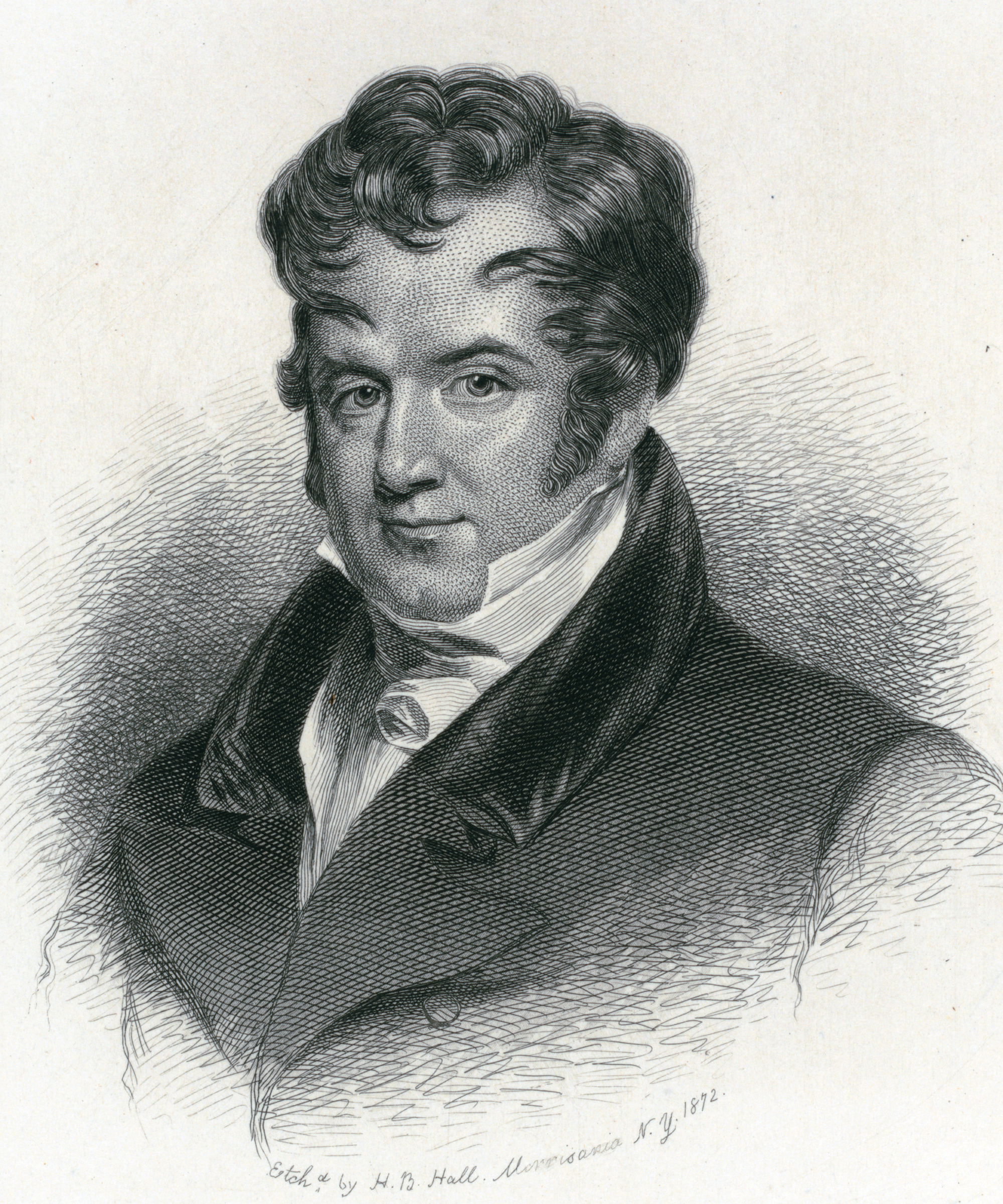
Stephen Price born 25 September

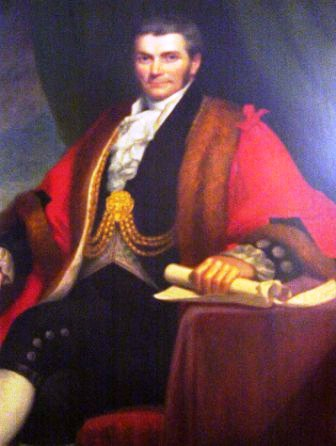
Richard Peek born 3 October

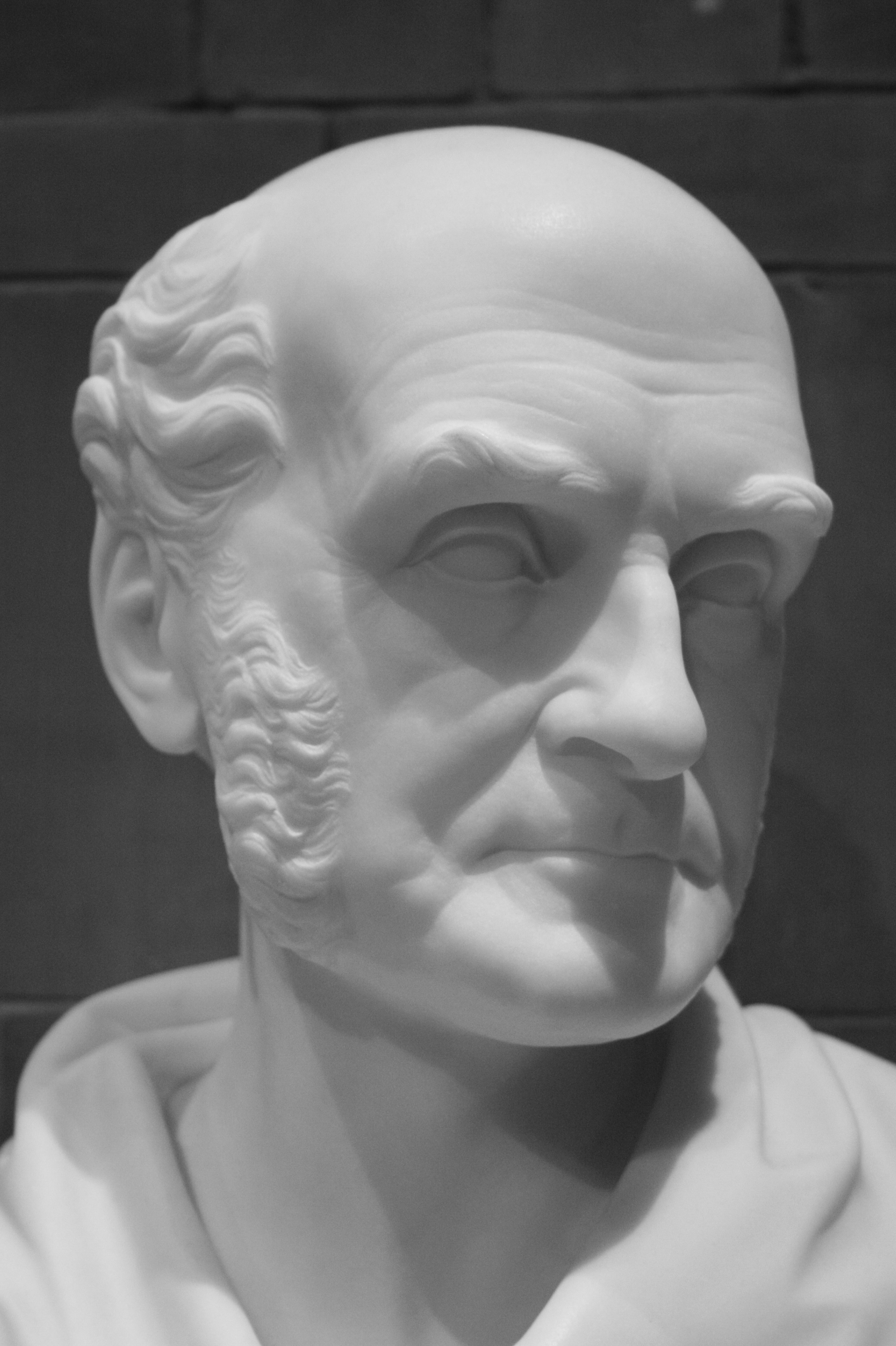
Charles Maclaren born 7 October

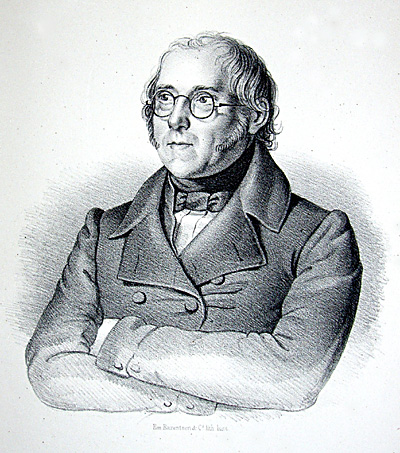
Steen Steensen Blicher born 11 October

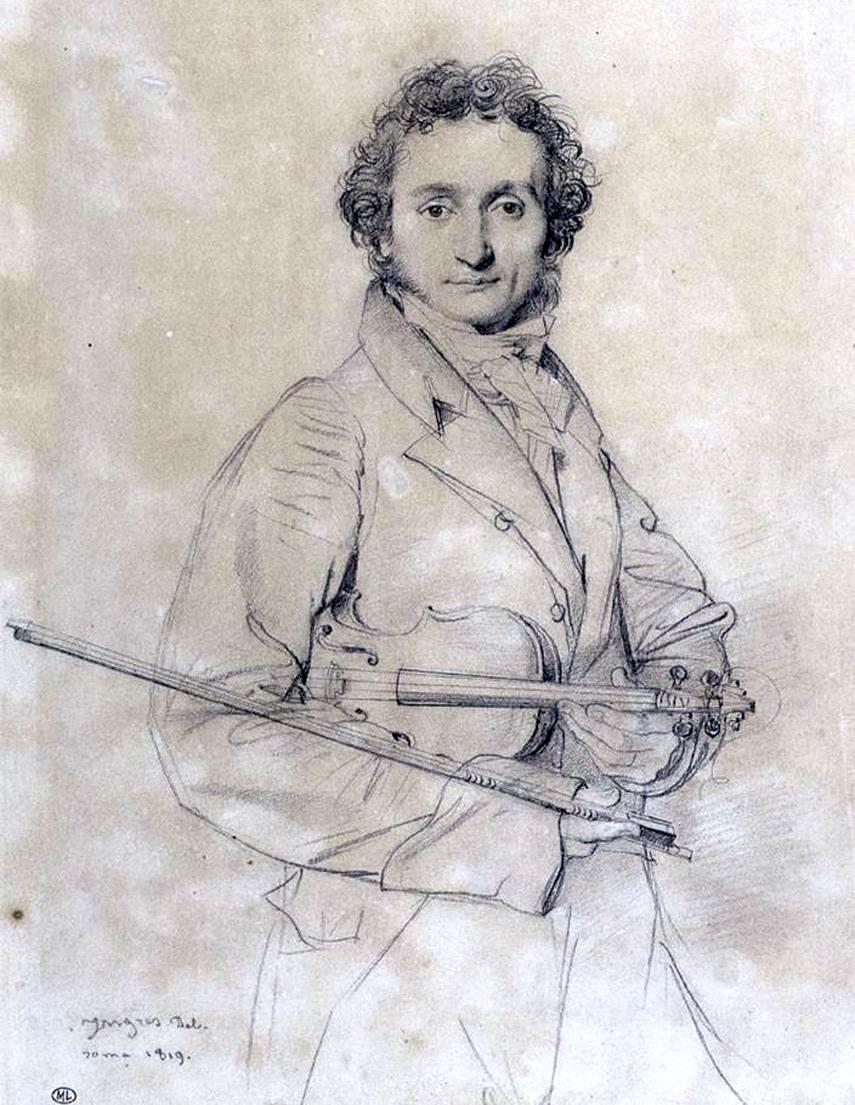
Niccolò Paganini born 27 October

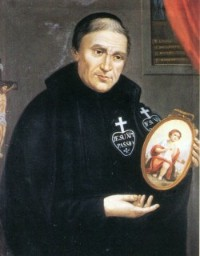
Lorenzo Maria of Saint Francis Xavier born 30 October

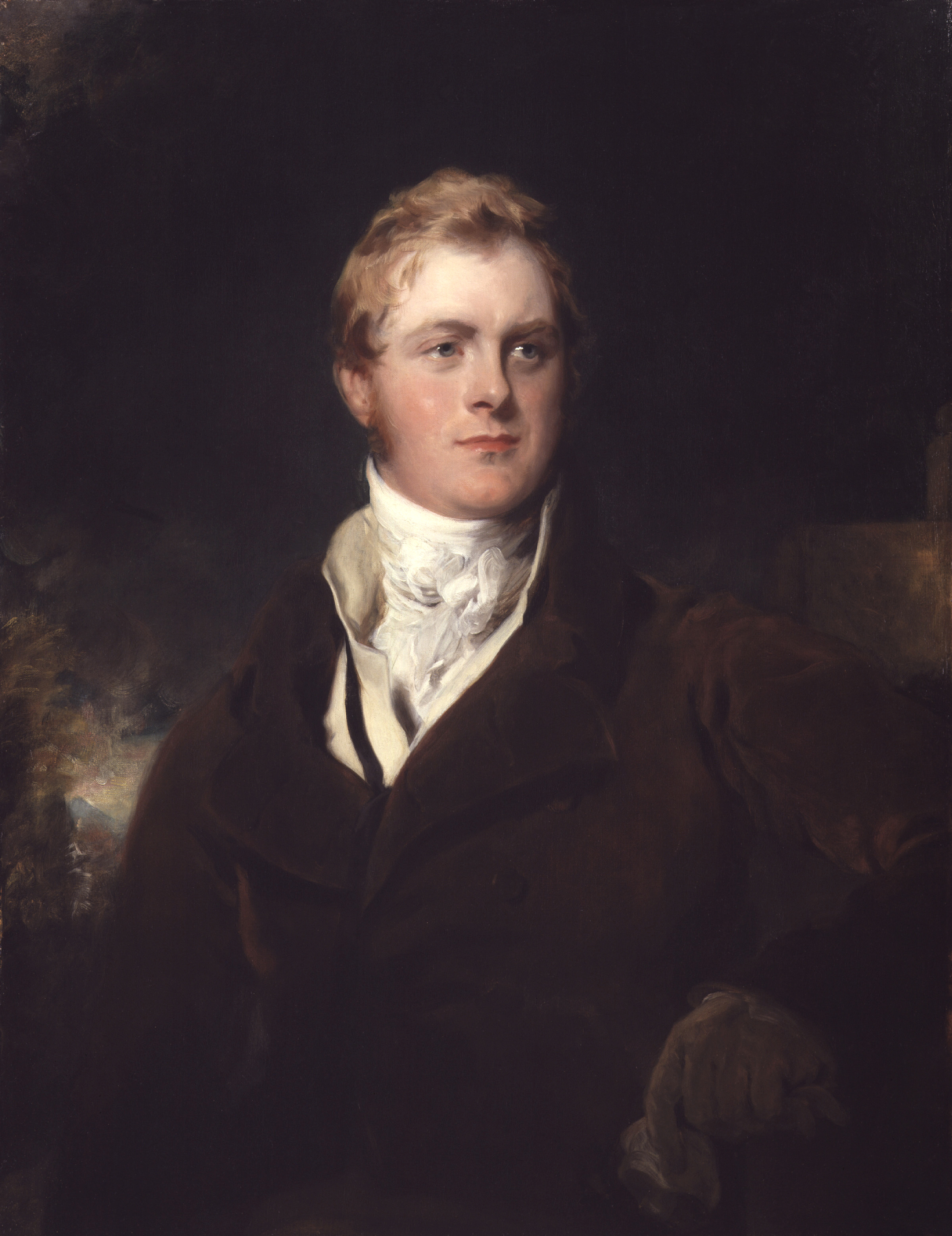
F. J. Robinson born 1 November

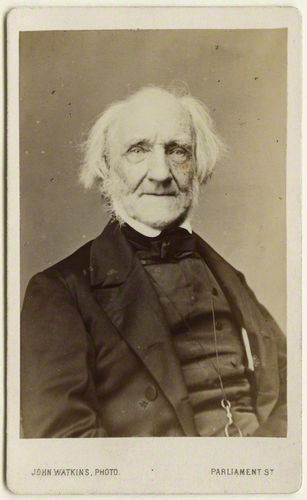
John Pye born 7 November

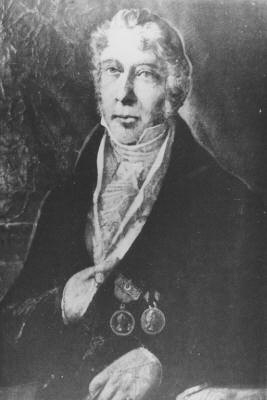
Joseph Kornhäusel born 13 November

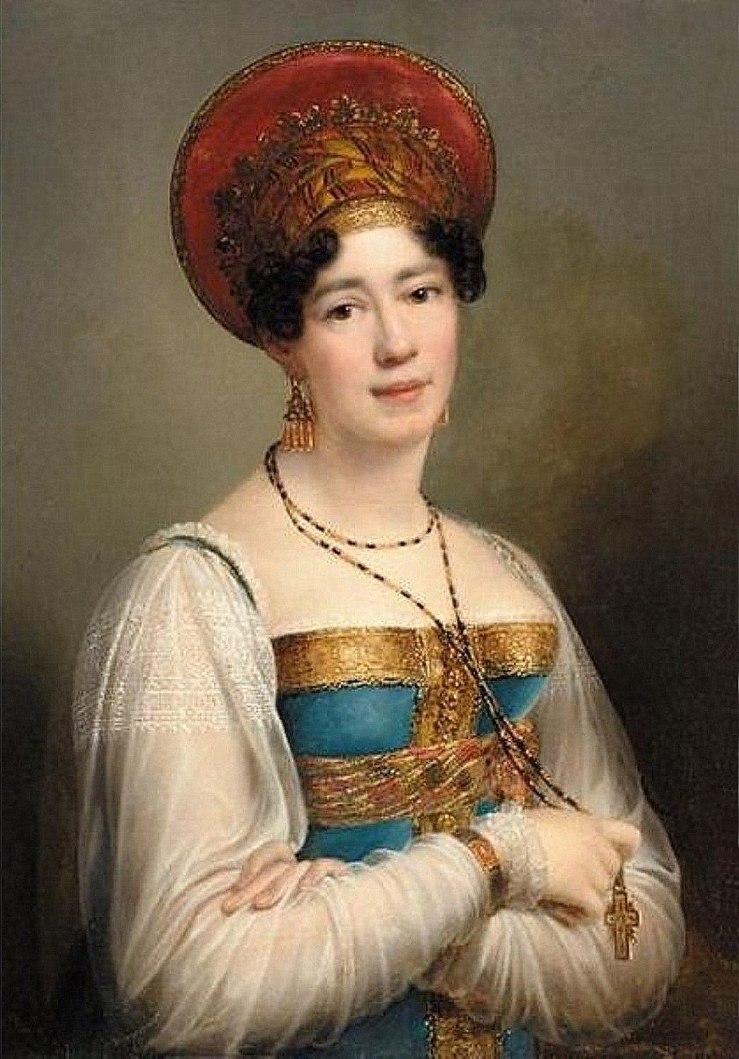
Sophie Swetchine born 22 November

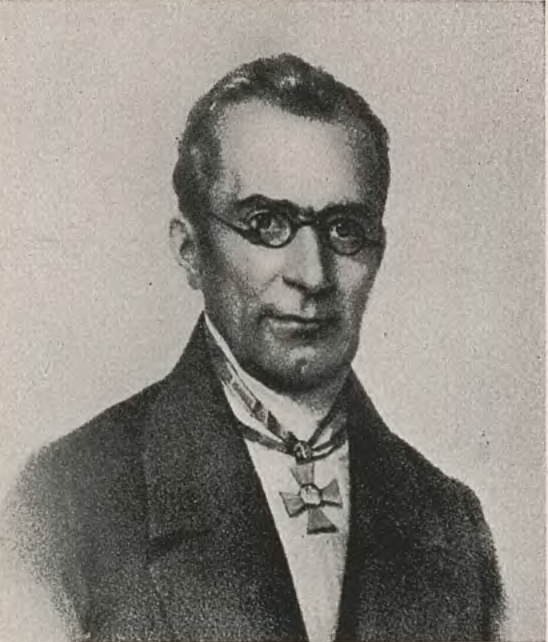
Karl Johann Bernhard Karsten born 26 November

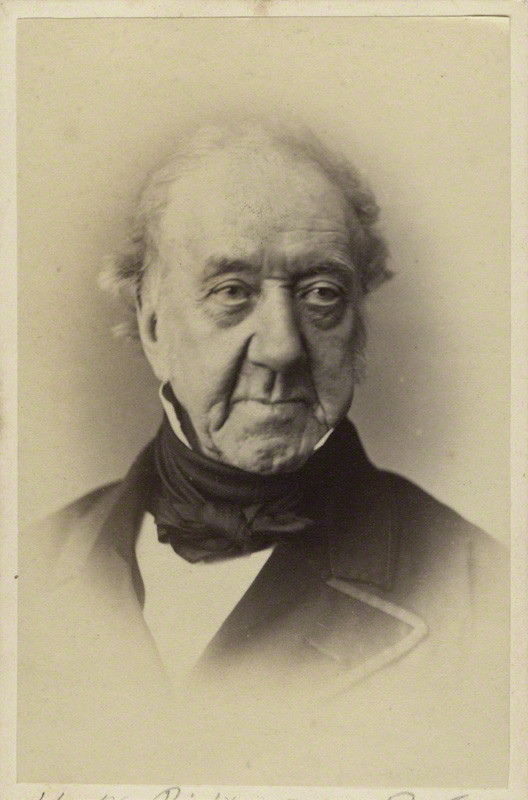
Henry William Pickersgill born 3 December

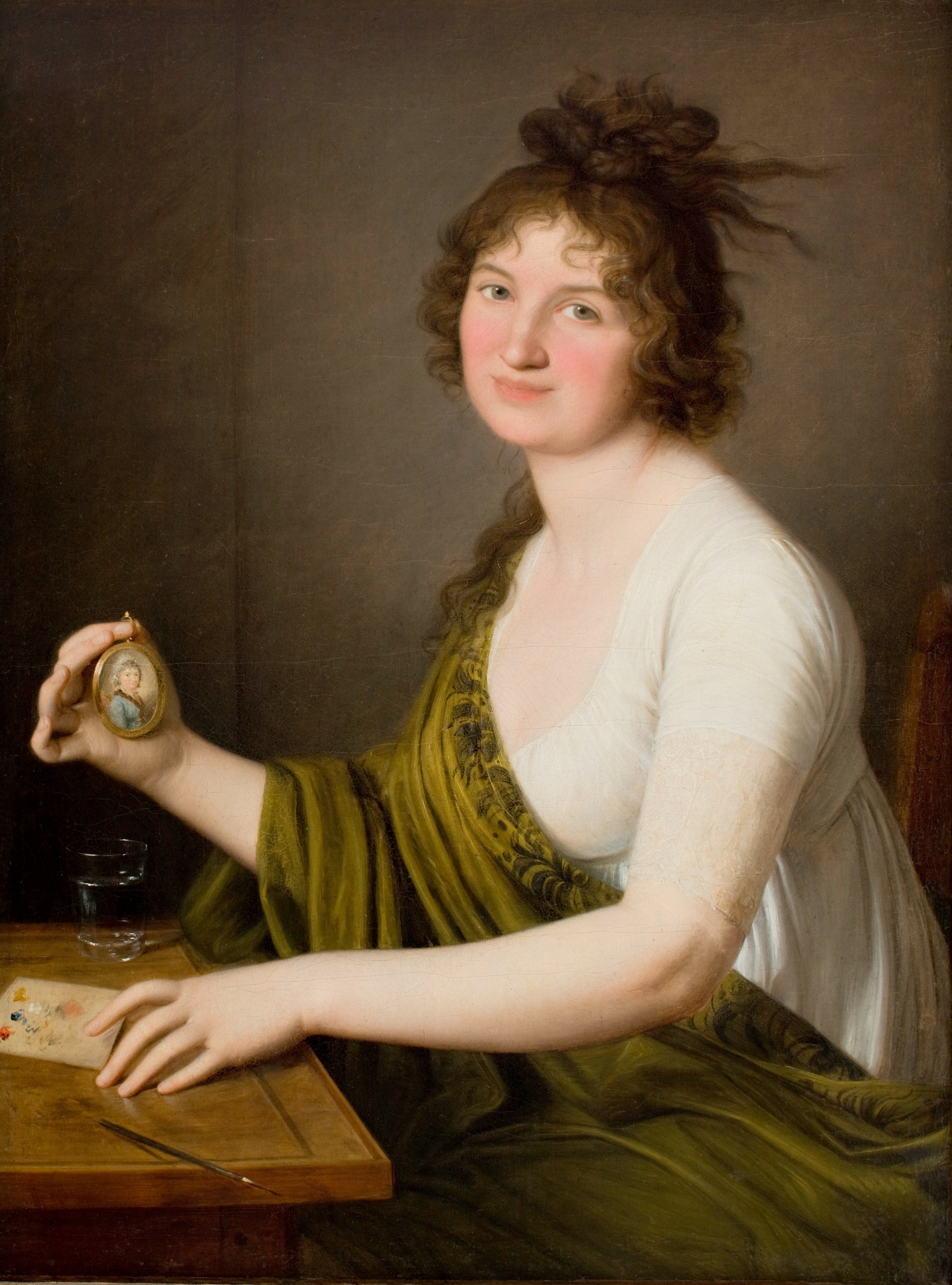
Waleria Tarnowska born 9 December

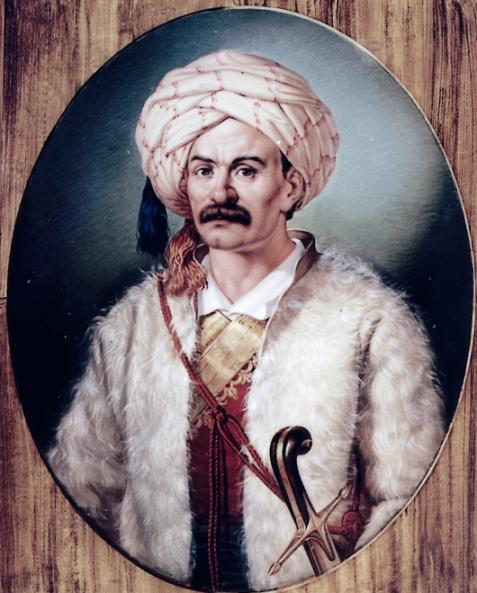
Charles Nicolas Fabvier born 10 December

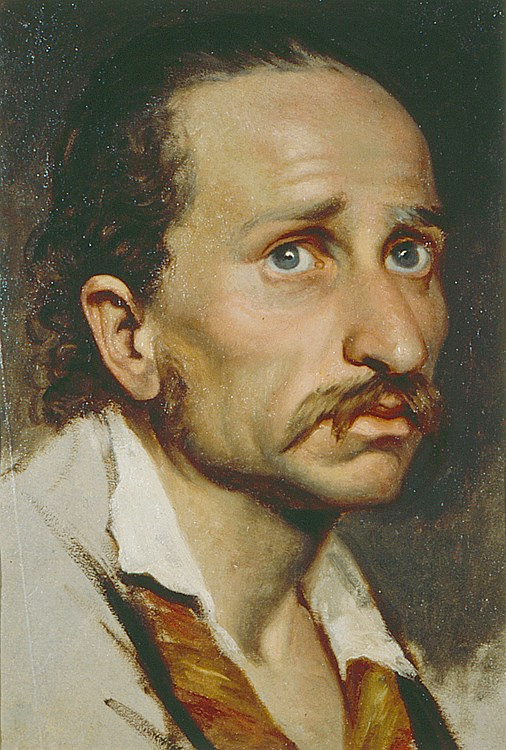
Hans Jakob Oeri born 16 December

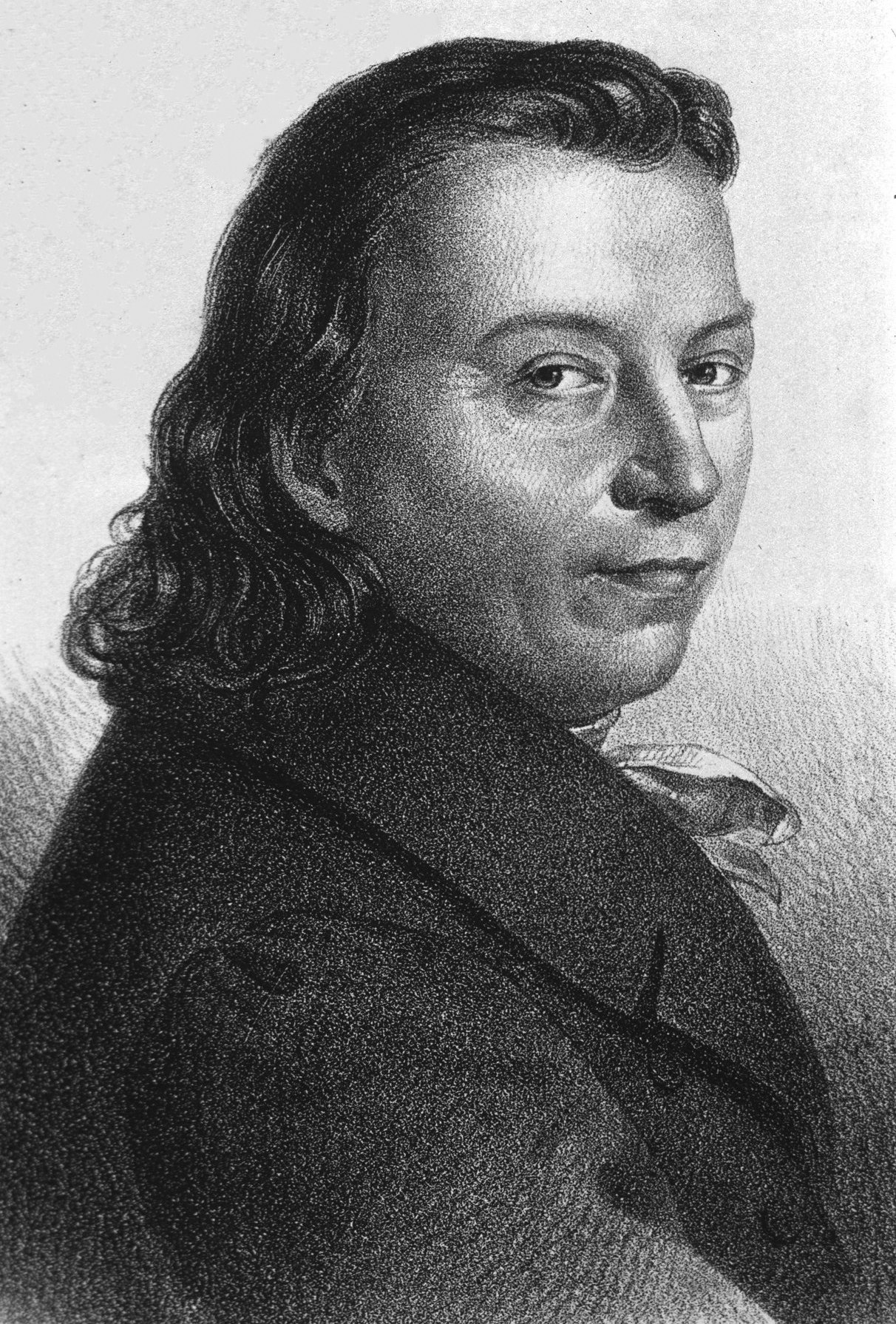
Julius Vincenz von Krombholz born 19 December

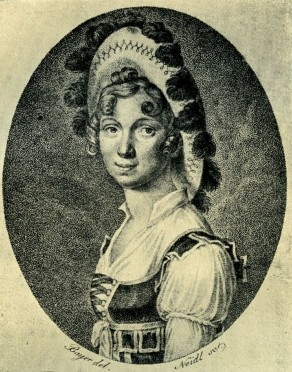
Therese Brunetti born 24 December

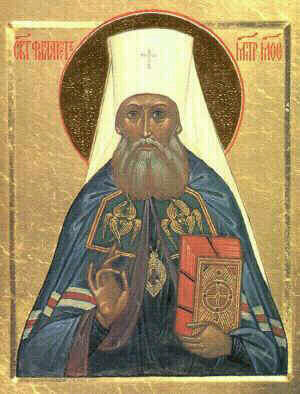
Philaret Drozdov born 26 December

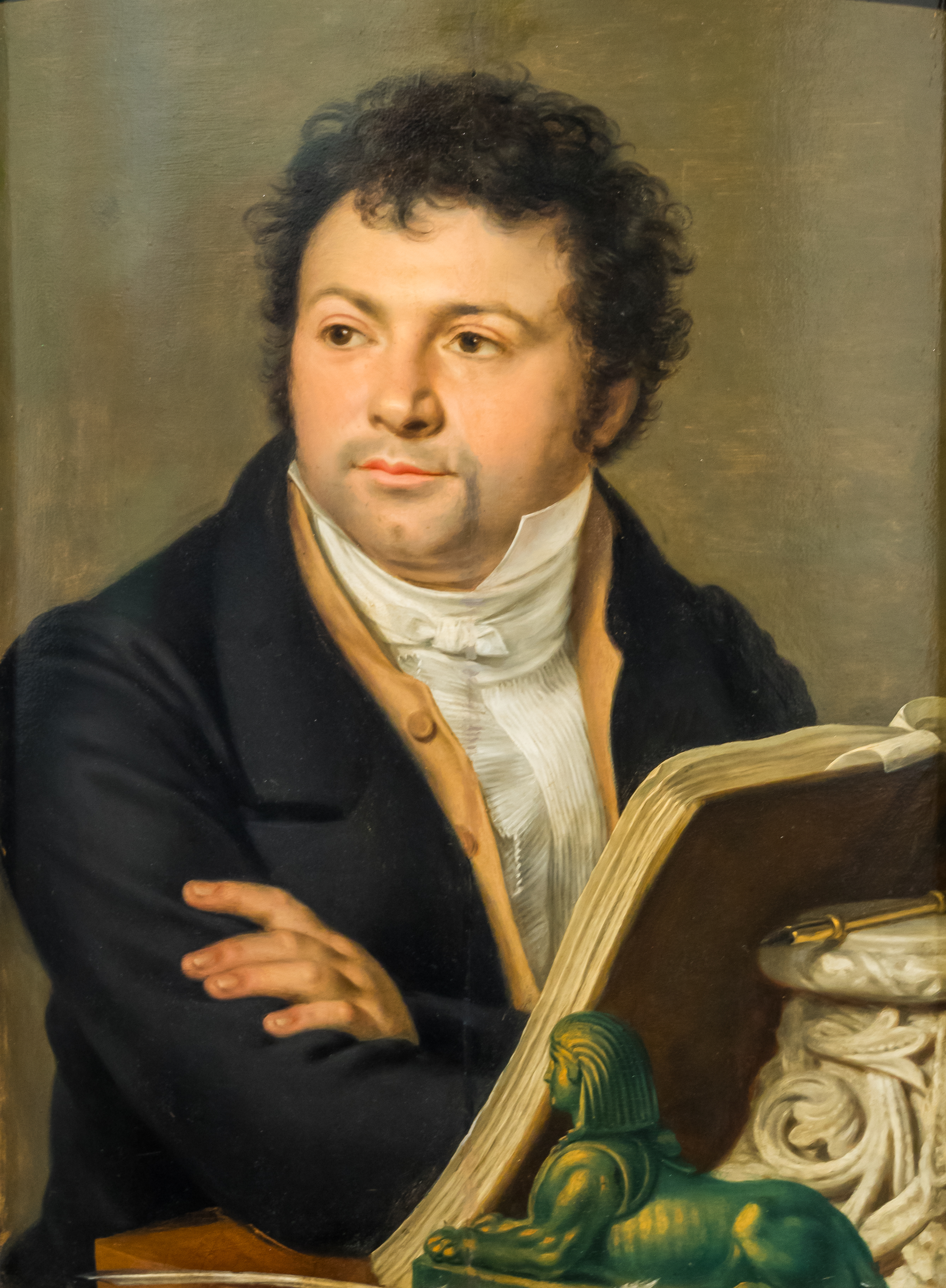
Matthias Joseph de Noël born 28 December

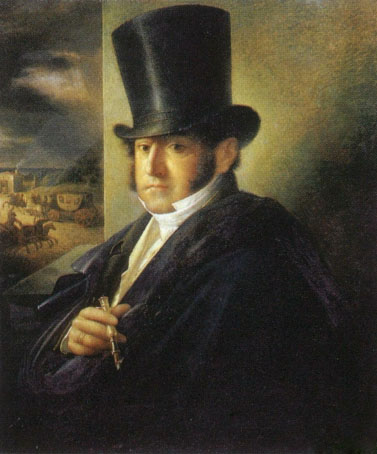
Konstantin Bulgakov born 31 December

- January 1 – John Bell, British army officer (d. 1876)
- January 2
  - Hugo von Bosch, Bavarian general and politician (d. 1865)
  - Hosea Hildreth, educator and minister in Massachusetts and New Hampshire (d. 1835)
  - El Pípila, Mexican miner and freedom fighter (d. 1863)
  - Thomas Starkie, British lawyer (d. 1849)
- January 3
  - Turner Saunders, American preacher (d. 1854)
  - Philipp Franz von Walther, German ophthalmologist (d. 1849)
- January 5 – Robert Morrison, British evangelist and first Protestant missionary in China (d. 1834)
- January 8
  - William Mudford, British journalist and writer (d. 1848)
  - Tommaso Riario Sforza, Italian cardinal (d. 1857)
- January 9 – Benning M. Bean, American politician (d. 1866)
- January 11 – Jean Laforgue, French scholar (d. 1852)
- January 12 – Martin Flint, American politician (d. 1855)
- January 13 – Robert Aspland, English Unitarian minister (d. 1845)
- January 14
  - Carl Ferdinand Langhans, German architect (d. 1869)
  - Stephen Lushington, British judge and Member of Parliament (d. 1873)
  - Thomas Sergeant, American lawyer and politician (d. 1860)
  - Peder Tonning, Norwegian politician (d. 1839)
- January 15
  - Elkanah Kelsey Dare, American composer (d. 1826)
  - Nikolaus Wolfgang Fischer, German physician and chemist (d. 1850)
  - Ōkubo Tadazane, daimyo (d. 1837)
- January 18
  - William Gosset, British Member of Parliament (d. 1848)
  - Daniel Webster, 14th and 19th United States Secretary of State (d. 1852)
- January 19
  - Michel Bibaud, Canadian writer (d. 1857)
  - John J. Chappell, American politician (d. 1871)
  - William Eden, British soldier and politician (d. 1810)
  - William Harris, 2nd Baron Harris, British Army general (d. 1845)
- January 20
  - Archduke John of Austria, Austrian soldier, imperial regent of the German Empire (d. 1859)
  - William Nott, British general (d. 1845)
- January 21
  - Jan George Bertelman, Dutch composer (d. 1854)
  - Afanasy Grigoriev, Russian architect (d. 1868)
  - James Patrick Murray, British politician (d. 1834)
- January 22
  - Philip Hamilton, son of American Founding Father, Alexander Hamilton (d. 1801)
  - Franciszek Ksawery Lampi, Austrian artist (d. 1852)
  - John Mitford, British naval officer and author (d. 1831)
- January 23 – José Francisco Bermúdez, Venezuelan revolutionary (d. 1831)
- January 24 – Charles K. Williams, American politician (d. 1853)
- January 25 – Johann Michael Ackner, Austrian archaeologist (d. 1862)
- January 26
  - William George Keith Elphinstone, British Army general (d. 1842)
  - Cornelius P. Van Ness, American politician (d. 1852)
- January 27
  - John Lea, US epidemiologist (d. 1862)
  - Titumir, Bengali revolutionary (d. 1831)
- January 29
  - Daniel Auber, French composer (d. 1871)
  - Daniel Parker, Adjutant general and inspector general of the US Army (d. 1846)
  - Franciszek Ścigalski, Polish composer and violinist (d. 1846)
- January 30
  - Pierre-Nolasque Bergeret, French painter (d. 1863)
  - James Caulfeild, British politician (d. 1852)
  - Wincenty Krasiński, nobleman, political activist and military leader (d. 1858)
  - Ann Taylor, British poet and literary critic (d. 1866)
- February 1 – Bill Johnston, American pirate (d. 1870)
- February 2
  - James Chalmers, alleged Scottish inventor of the adhesive postage stamp (d. 1853)
  - Henri de Rigny, commander of the French squadron at the Battle of Navarino in the Greek War of Independence (d. 1835)
- February 3
  - John Macdonald Kinneir, British diplomat (d. 1830)
  - John Lamont, Scottish sugar planter in Trinidad (d. 1850)
  - William Pinnock, British publisher and educational writer (d. 1843)
  - Ansel Sterling, American politician (d. 1853)
- February 4
  - Charles William Grant, 5th Baron de Longueuil (d. 1848)
  - Henry Lee, US political economist (d. 1867)
- February 6 – Fyodor Tolstoy, Russian explorer (d. 1846)
- February 8
  - Friedrich Ernst Ludwig von Fischer, Russian botanist (d. 1854)
  - Juan Cuevas Perales, Spanish composer (d. 1855)
  - Malla Silfverstolpe, Swedish salon-holder (d. 1861)
- February 9
  - William Havell, British artist (d. 1857)
  - Philip Shuttleworth, English churchman and academic, Bishop of Chichester (d. 1842)
- February 10
  - Robert Hallowell Gardiner, American land owner (d. 1864)
  - Jean-Marie-Nicolas Lucas de Montigny, French magistrate (d. 1852)
  - Niels Arntzen Sem, Norwegian politician (d. 1859)
  - Ashur Ware, United States federal judge (d. 1873)
- February 11
  - William Lowndes, American politician, enslaver (d. 1822)
  - Henri Jean de Rouvroy, Marquis of Saint-Simon, French soldier, diplomat, politician, officer (d. 1865)
- February 12 – Auguste de Schonen, French politician (d. 1849)
- February 14
  - Eleanora Atherton, English philanthropist (d. 1870)
  - Ephraim Sturdivant, American veteran (d. 1868)
- February 15
  - John H. Dent, United States Navy officer (d. 1823)
  - William Miller, American religious leader (d. 1849)
  - Louis Perrin, Irish politician (d. 1864)
- February 17 – Thomas Baxter, British artist (d. 1821)
- February 19
  - Christopher Anderson, theological writer and preacher (d. 1852)
  - Henry Bentley, English first-class cricketer (d. 1857)
  - Princess Pauline, Duchess of Sagan, Princess of Courland (d. 1845)
- February 22
  - Karl Stefan Aichelburg, Austrian musician (d. 1817)
  - James Towers English, Irish military commander (d. 1819)
  - John Gebhard, American politician (d. 1854)
  - Johann Friedrich Ludwig Hausmann, German mineralogist (d. 1859)
- February 23
  - John Wilson Campbell, US federal judge (d. 1833)
  - Peder Nielsen Hemb, Norwegian politician (d. 1850)
  - Johann Baptist Emanuel Pohl, Australian botanist, entomologist, geologist, physician (d. 1834)
- February 24 – Thomas Uwins, British artist (d. 1857)
- February 25 – William Sturgis, American merchant and politician (d. 1863)
- February 26 – Louise Antoinette Lannes, Duchess of Montebello, French noble (d. 1856)
- February 27 – Marie Thérèse Haze, Belgian Religious Sister and foundress, beatified (d. 1876)
- February 28 – Josef Božek, Czech engineer and inventor (d. 1835)
- March 1 – Suzanne le Peletier de Saint-Fargeau, French noblewoman (d. 1829)
- March 2
  - Isaac Pocock, English dramatist and painter (d. 1835)
  - Edward Sheldon, politician (d. 1836)
- March 3
  - Joseph Edson, US Marshal for Vermont (d. 1832)
  - Jean-Baptiste Sanson de Pongerville, French writer and librarian (d. 1870)
- March 4
  - Gabriel-Alexandre Belle, French writer (d. 1855)
  - Johann Rudolf Wyss, Swiss writer (d. 1830)
- March 5 – Wacław Hański, Polish noble (d. 1841)
- March 6
  - Andreas Bonnevie, Norwegian politician (d. 1833)
  - Karoline von Woltmann, German translator and writer (d. 1847)
- March 7
  - Henryka Beyer, Polish artist (d. 1855)
  - Angelo Mai, cardinal and philologist in Italy (d. 1854)
  - Charles Sterrett Ridgely, American land developer and legislator (d. 1847)
- March 8 – Nicoll Halsey, American politician (d. 1865)
- March 9 – Jean-François Boch, Luxembourgish industrialist and politician (d. 1858)
- March 10
  - Ferdinand Gottlieb von Gmelin, German physician, natural historian, chemist and explorer (d. 1848)
  - Charles Gray, Captain in the Royal Marines (d. 1851)
- March 13
  - Sir Robert Bateson, 1st Baronet, Irish politician (d. 1863)
  - Orest Kiprensky, Russian artist (d. 1836)
  - Jacob Krebs, American politician (d. 1847)
  - Ivan Leontiev, Imperial Russian general who fought in the Napoleonic Wars (d. 1824)
- March 14
  - Thomas Hart Benton, State Senator from Tennessee (d. 1858)
  - Nathaniel F. Williams, American politician (d. 1864)
- March 16
  - William Graham, Indiana politician (d. 1858)
  - Vasili Krasovsky, Russian writer (d. 1824)
- March 17
  - Billy Caldwell, British-Potawatomi and American fur trader (d. 1841)
  - Franz Körte, German agronomist (d. 1845)
  - Sophie von Kühn, German noble (d. 1797)
  - John Styles, English Congregational minister and animal rights writer (d. 1849)
- March 18
  - John C. Calhoun, vice president of the United States (d. 1850)
  - José Gabriel de Silva-Bazán, 10th Marquess of Santa Cruz, Spanish diplomat and politician (d. 1839)
- March 19
  - Wilhelm von Biela, Austrian astronomer (d. 1856)
  - Peter Drummond-Burrell, 22nd Baron Willoughby de Eresby, English politician (d. 1865)
- March 20 – James Tod, English officer of the British East India Company, oriental scholar (d. 1835)
- March 21 – Józef Goldtmann, Polish priest (d. 1852)
- March 22 – James Parke, 1st Baron Wensleydale, British barrister and judge (d. 1868)
- March 23
  - William C. Bradley, American politician (d. 1867)
  - John Sudam, American politician (d. 1835)
- March 24
  - Aglaé Auguié, French court official (d. 1854)
  - William Owsley, 16th Governor of Kentucky (d. 1862)
- March 25
  - Caroline Bonaparte, Queen of Naples and Sicily (d. 1839)
  - Edward Grey, British Anglican bishop of Hereford (d. 1837)
- March 26
  - Charles-Maurice Descombes, French playwright and literary critic (d. 1869)
  - Benjamin Joseph Frobisher, Canadian politician (d. 1821)
- March 29
  - Thomas Bryn, father of the Constitution of Norway, member of Stortinget (d. 1827)
  - John Dickinson, British inventor (d. 1869)
  - Stephen Reay, Scottish priest, orientalist (d. 1861)
- March 31
  - Jesse Ketchum, Canadian politician (d. 1867)
  - Louis-Hippolyte Lebas, French architect (d. 1867)
  - Samuel Prentiss, United States federal judge (d. 1857)
- April 1
  - James Daly, 1st Baron Dunsandle and Clanconal, British politician (d. 1847)
  - George C. Sibley, American explorer and politician (d. 1863)
- April 2 – Johannes West, Inspector of Greenland (d. 1835)
- April 3
  - Daniel Garrison, American politician (d. 1851)
  - William Lyttelton, 3rd Baron Lyttelton, English Whig politician (d. 1837)
  - Alexander Macomb, United States Army general (d. 1841)
- April 4
  - Vincenzo Flauti, Italian mathematician (d. 1863)
  - George Rowley, British academic (d. 1836)
- April 5
  - James R. Manley, American physician (d. 1851)
  - Edward West, British economist and judge in India (d. 1828)
- April 7 – Marie-Anne Libert, Belgian botanist and mycologist (d. 1865)
- April 9 – Joseph Hunter Bryan, American politician (d. 1839)
- April 10 – María Antonia Santos Plata, Neogranadine rebel leader & heroine (d. 1819)
- April 11 – Abraham Abell, Irish antiquarian (d. 1851)
- April 14 – Carlo Coccia, Italian composer (d. 1873)
- April 15 – Eleazer W. Ripley, American politician (d. 1839)
- April 16
  - William Jerdan, Scottish journalist (d. 1869)
  - Toribio de Luzuriaga, Argentinian military personnel (d. 1842)
- April 17
  - Joseph Carne, British geologist and industrialist (d. 1858)
  - Frederick Lamb, 3rd Viscount Melbourne, British diplomat (d. 1853)
- April 18 – Georg August Goldfuss, German paleontologist, mineralogist, zoologist and botanist (d. 1848)
- April 21
  - Friedrich Fröbel, German pedagogue (d. 1852)
  - Samuel Hibbert-Ware, British geologist and antiquarian (d. 1848)
- April 23 – Prince Teimuraz of Georgia, Georgian royal prince and scholar (d. 1846)
- April 25 – Adriano Balbi, Italian geographer (d. 1848)
- April 26 – Maria Amalia of Naples and Sicily, Queen of France (d. 1866)
- April 27 – Jeptha Vining Harris, Georgia militia Brigadier General (d. 1856)
- April 28 – William Darlington, American physician, botanist, politician (d. 1863)
- April 29 – James Fowle Baldwin, American engineer (d. 1862)
- May 1 – Yevgeny Golovin, Russian general (d. 1858)
- May 4
  - James Bathurst, British Army officer (d. 1850)
  - Friedrich Philipp Ritterich, German ophthalmologist (d. 1866)
  - John R. Williams, American politician (d. 1854)
- May 5 – Edward Richard Stewart, British politician (d. 1851)
- May 6
  - Charles-René Laitié, French sculptor (d. 1862)
  - Edward Charles Whinyates, English army officer (d. 1865)
- May 8 – Ivan Paskevich, military leader of Ukrainian descent (d. 1856)
- May 9
  - Virgil Horace Barber, American Jesuit (d. 1847)
  - Marcia Van Ness, founded Washington Orphan Asylum in 1815 (d. 1832)
- May 10 – Louis-René Villermé, French economist (d. 1863)
- May 12 – Lippmann Moses Büschenthal, German poet (d. 1818)
- May 13
  - Henry A. P. Muhlenberg, American politician (d. 1844)
  - Johan Gustaf Sandberg, Swedish artist (d. 1854)
  - Ferdinand de Bertier de Sauvigny, French politician (d. 1864)
- May 14
  - John McElroy, Jesuit Priest (d. 1877)
  - Antoine-Marie Roederer, French politician (d. 1865)
- May 16 – John Sell Cotman, British artist (d. 1842)
- May 18
  - John Ferneley, English painter (d. 1860)
  - Ludwig Adolf Wilhelm von Lützow, Prussian lieutenant-general (d. 1834)
  - Valerian Madatov, Russian general (d. 1829)
  - Gilbert C. Russell, American military officer (d. 1861)
- May 19
  - Rowland Stephenson, British politician (d. 1856)
  - Mikhail Semyonovich Vorontsov, Russian prince and Field Marshal (d. 1856)
- May 22 – Hirose Tansō, Japanese poet and writer (d. 1856)
- May 23
  - Christopher Crackenthorp Askew, British Royal Navy officer, captain in 1822 (d. 1848)
  - Charles Fothergill, Canadian politician (d. 1840)
- May 26
  - Medora Gordon Byron, British Romantic novelist (d. 1858)
  - Joseph Drechsler, Czech conductor, music educator, composer and organist (d. 1852)
  - Erasmo Seguín, head postmaster of San Antonio, Texas (d. 1857)
  - George Small, Scottish piano manufacturer (d. 1861)
  - Sir George Strickland, 7th Baronet, British politician (d. 1874)
- May 27 – Antoni Jan Ostrowski, Polish general (d. 1845)
- May 28
  - Sir Charles Mansfield Clarke, 1st Baronet, British surgeon (d. 1857)
  - Johann Rombauer, painter from Hungary (d. 1849)
  - Wouter Johannes van Troostwijk, painter from the Northern Netherlands, 1782–1810 (d. 1810)
- May 29 – James Murray, 1st Baron Glenlyon, British Army general (d. 1837)
- May 30 – John Spencer, 3rd Earl Spencer, British politician (d. 1845)
- May 31 – Thomas Courtenay, British politician (d. 1841)
- June 1
  - Lord William FitzRoy, British Member of Parliament (d. 1857)
  - Thomas Van Horne, US politician and Ohio State Senator (d. 1841)
  - Konstantin Poltoratsky, lieutenant general of the Imperial Russian Army (d. 1858)
  - Ferdinand von Tiesenhausen, Russian noble and military commander (d. 1805)
- June 3 – Charles Waterton, English naturalist, explorer and conservationist (d. 1865)
- June 4
  - Frédéric Théodore Faber, Belgian painter (d. 1844)
  - Christian Martin Frähn, German and Russian numismatist and historian (d. 1851)
- June 5
  - Lemuel Williams Jr., American lawyer and politician (d. 1869)
  - Ulrik Frederik Anton de Schouboe, Norwegian civil servant and politician (d. 1863)
- June 6 – Vicenta Moguel, Basque writer and translator (d. 1854)
- June 7 – Rowland Alston, English politician (d. 1865)
- June 8 – Seaton Grantland, American politician (d. 1864)
- June 9
  - Peter Fisher, Canadian historian (d. 1848)
  - Alexander Powell, British Tory politician and MP (d. 1847)
- June 10
  - Amable Guillaume Prosper Brugière, baron de Barante, French historian and statesman (d. 1866)
  - Ole Christian Andersen Nøstvig, Norwegian politician (d. 1852)
- June 11 – Richard Hill, Church of England clergyman in New South Wales (d. 1836)
- June 12
  - Pyotr Kotlyarevsky, Russian general (d. 1851)
  - Peter Schmidt, Norwegian politician and businessman (d. 1845)
- June 13
  - Marie-Anne-Julie Forestier, French painter (d. 1853)
  - William Bullein Johnson, American Baptist minister (d. 1862)
- June 14 – Anton Aloys Wolf, Prince-Bishop of Laibach (Ljubljana) (d. 1859)
- June 15 – Alexander George Woodford, British Army officer (d. 1870)
- June 16
  - Nehemiah Eastman, American congressman for New Hampshire (d. 1856)
  - Olry Terquem, French mathematician (d. 1862)
- June 17 – Joseph Slater Jr., British portrait painter and draughtsman (d. 1837)
- June 18
  - George Rodney, 3rd Baron Rodney, British Baron (d. 1842)
  - Marceli Tarczewski, Polish lawyer (d. 1843)
- June 19 – Félicité de La Mennais, French priest, philosopher and political theorist (d. 1854)
- June 20 – Charles Floyd, American explorer (d. 1804)
- June 21 – Princess Maria Augusta of Saxony (d. 1863)
- June 24
  - Sir William Heygate, 1st Baronet, British MP (d. 1844)
  - Juan Larrea, Argentine politician (d. 1847)
  - Harmanus Peek, American politician (d. 1838)
- June 25 – William O'Brien, Canadian political figure in Nova Scotia (d. 1851)
- June 26
  - Fortunée Briquet, French woman of letters (d. 1815)
  - Juan José Pedro Carrera, Chilean politician (d. 1818)
  - Peter Paul Dobrée, British classical scholar (d. 1825)
- June 29
  - Hans Christian Lyngbye, Danish priest and botanist (d. 1837)
  - William Stockbridge, American businessman (d. 1850)
- June 30 – William Cathcart, Scottish naval officer (d. 1804)
- July 1 – Pieter Hendrik van Zuylen van Nijevelt, Dutch and French army general (d. 1825)
- July 2 – Adrien de Rougé, French statesman, soldier (d. 1838)
- July 3 – Pierre Berthier, French geologist (d. 1861)
- July 4 – Adèle Duchâtel, French court official (d. 1860)
- July 5
  - Mads Lauritz Madsen, Norwegian politician (d. 1840)
  - Arabella Menage, British actress and dancer (d. 1817)
  - Rosa Morandi, Italian soprano (d. 1824)
- July 6
  - Luis Brión, Venezuelan military officer (d. 1821)
  - Henri Antoine Jacques, French botanist (d. 1866)
  - Maria Luisa, Duchess of Lucca, Spanish Royal (d. 1824)
- July 7
  - John Myers Felder, American politician (d. 1851)
  - Thomas Wilde, 1st Baron Truro, British lawyer, judge and politician (d. 1858)
- July 9
  - Tomaso Catullo, Italian noblemen, geologist, paleontologist and zoologist (d. 1869)
  - Lancelot-Théodore Turpin de Crissé, French painter and writer (d. 1859)
- July 10 – Moses Elias Levy, Jewish-American businessman and reformer (d. 1854)
- July 12 – Étienne Marc Quatremère, French orientalist (d. 1857)
- July 13
  - Thomas William Taylor, British Army officer (d. 1854)
  - Charlotte White, American missionary (d. 1863)
- July 14
  - Archduke Maximilian of Austria-Este, Austrian archduke (d. 1863)
  - Jesse Elliott, United States Navy officer (d. 1845)
- July 16
  - Sophie Ørsted, Danish muse (d. 1818)
  - Joachim Heinrich Wilhelm Wagener, German banker and patron of the arts (d. 1861)
- July 17 – James Cockle, British surgeon (d. 1854)
- July 18 – Mariano Enrique Calvo, president and vice president of Bolivia (d. 1842)
- July 19
  - Jonathan Blewitt, English composer (d. 1853)
  - Charles Gardiner, 1st Earl of Blessington, Irish Earl (d. 1829)
  - Iinuma Yokusai, Japanese botanist and physician (d. 1865)
- July 23 – Johann Heinrich Rosenplänter, Baltic German parish priest and linguist (d. 1846)
- July 24
  - John Fox Burgoyne, British Army officer (d. 1871)
  - William Temple Thomson Mason, American businessman (d. 1862)
- July 25
  - Mariano Boedo, Argentine politician (d. 1819)
  - Lincoln Goodale, American doctor (d. 1868)
  - Michael Rohde, German botanist (d. 1812)
  - Sir David Scott, 2nd Baronet, Member of the United Kingdom Parliament (d. 1851)
- July 26 – John Field, Irish pianist, composer and teacher (d. 1837)
- July 27 – Basilio Puoti, Italian lexicographer and literary critic (d. 1847)
- July 28
  - Aristaces Azaria, Armenian Catholic abbot and archbishop (d. 1855)
  - Thomas Burnside, American politician (d. 1851)
- July 29
  - François Liénard de la Mivoye, French zoologist and botanist (d. 1862)
  - Jesse Wharton, American politician (d. 1833)
- July 31 – Oliver H. Prince, American politician (d. 1837)
- August 1
  - Johann Casimir Benicken, German jurist and judge (d. 1838)
  - Eugène de Mazenod, French bishop and saint (d. 1861)
- August 2 – Johannes van Hooydonk, Dutch Roman Catholic clergyman and bishop (d. 1868)
- August 4 – John Kerr, member of the US House of Representatives (d. 1842)
- August 6 – William Spencer, American judge and politician (d. 1871)
- August 10
  - Vicente Guerrero, 2nd President of Mexico (d. 1831)
  - Matsudaira Muneakira, Japanese daimyo (d. 1840)
  - Charles James Napier, Governor of Sindh, Commander-in-Chief in British India (d. 1853)
- August 12 – Ole Johansen Winstrup, Danish engineer and inventor (d. 1867)
- August 13 – Conrad Ten Eyck, American politician (d. 1847)
- August 15
  - Carlo Brioschi, Italian astronomer (d. 1833)
  - James Smith of Jordanhill, Scottish merchant, geologist and biblical critic (d. 1867)
  - Charles Lowell, United States Unitarian minister (d. 1861)
  - Henri de Merode, member of the Belgian Senate and writer (d. 1847)
  - Faustin Soulouque, President and emperor of Haiti (d. 1867)
- August 16 – Elderkin Potter, American politician and lawyer (d. 1845)
- August 17
  - Pierre-Luc-Charles Cicéri, French stage designer (d. 1868)
  - Pavel Martynov, Russian Lieutenant General (d. 1838)
- August 18
  - Jean-Louis Boisselot, French composer and piano manufacturer (d. 1847)
  - Marcellin Marbot, French general (d. 1854)
- August 20
  - Nicolas-Philibert Adelon, French physician (d. 1862)
  - Charles Fraser, American painter (d. 1860)
  - Juliana de Almeida e Oyenhausen, Russian noble (d. 1864)
- August 23 – David Hudson, American politician (d. 1860)
- August 25
  - Charles Comte, French lawyer, journalist and political writer (d. 1837)
  - Joseph Heinrich Gügler, Swiss theologian (d. 1827)
  - Prince Carl Gustav, Duke of Småland, Swedish prince (d. 1783)
  - Sylvester Pattie, American frontiersman (d. 1828)
- August 28
  - Antoine Maurice Apollinaire d'Argout, French politician (d. 1858)
  - John Wray, barrister and the first Receiver of the London Metropolitan Police (d. 1869)
- August 29
  - John Bowman, American lawyer, banker and politician from New York (d. 1853)
  - Louis Antoine François de Marchangy, French advocate general, poet and politician (d. 1826)
  - John Augustine Smith, President of the College of William & Mary (d. 1865)
- August 30 – Christian of the Palatinate-Zweibrücken, Bavarian general (d. 1859)
- August 31
  - Joseph H. Crane, American politician (d. 1851)
  - Edward Russell, American politician (d. 1835)
- September 1
  - Frances Alsop, English actor (d. 1816)
  - Thomas Reade, English army officer and consul in Tunis (d. 1849)
- September 2 – Myndert Van Schaick, American politician (d. 1865)
- September 3
  - Benedict Joseph Fenwick, American Catholic bishop (d. 1846)
  - Christian Ludwig Nitzsch, German zoologist and botanist (d. 1837)
- September 5
  - Charles Malcolm, British Royal Navy officer (d. 1851)
  - Maeda Narinaga, Japanese samurai and daimyo (d. 1824)
- September 6 – Doxachi Hurmuzachi, ethnic Romanian boyar from the Duchy of Bukovina (d. 1857)
- September 7
  - Princess Marie of Baden, Duchess of Brunswick-Wolfenbüttel & Brunswick-Oels (d. 1808)
  - Clark Bissell, American judge and politician (d. 1857)
  - Susan Edmonstone Ferrier, Scottish novelist (d. 1854)
  - Crown Prince Munhyo, Crown prince of the Kingdom of Korea (d. 1786)
- September 8
  - Johan Gørbitz, Norwegian painter (d. 1853)
  - Mariano Montilla, Venezuelan politician (d. 1851)
- September 9
  - Andreas Andersen Feldborg, Danish writer (d. 1838)
  - Charles-François Painchaud, Quebec priest (d. 1838)
- September 10 – John Ketcham, American politician (d. 1865)
- September 11
  - Fisher A. Blocksom, American politician and lawyer from Ohio (d. 1876)
  - Daniel Gaskell, British politician (d. 1875)
- September 13 – William Wood, Scottish surgeon (d. 1858)
- September 14 – Christian Magnus Falsen, jurist, father of the Constitution of Norway and member of Stortinget (d. 1830)
- September 16
  - Daoguang Emperor, Qing-dynasty Chinese emperor (d. 1850)
  - Hans Nilsen Gubberud, Norwegian politician (d. 1835)
- September 17 – Christoph Hawich, German lithographer and painter (d. 1848)
- September 18 – José Tomás Boves, Spanish general (d. 1815)
- September 19
  - Karl von Fischer, German architect (d. 1820)
  - Vicente Genaro de Quesada, Spanish general (d. 1836)
  - Robert Sale, British Army general (d. 1845)
  - John Wroe, British evangelist (d. 1863)
- September 20
  - Richard Dunning, 2nd Baron Ashburton, British noble (d. 1823)
  - Edward John Eliot, English cavalry officer (d. 1863)
- September 22
  - Pierre-Dominique Debartzch, Canadian politician (d. 1846)
  - Fredric Westin, Swedish painter (d. 1862)
- September 23
  - Jacques Féréol Mazas, French musician (d. 1849)
  - Prince Maximilian of Wied-Neuwied, German explorer, ethnologist and naturalist (d. 1867)
- September 24 – William Symonds, British Royal Navy admiral (d. 1856)
- September 25
  - Charles Maturin, Irish writer (d. 1824)
  - Stephen Price, theatre manager from New York City (d. 1840)
- September 27 – Thomas M. Nelson, American politician (d. 1853)
- September 28 – George Smith, English architect and surveyor (d. 1869)
- September 29 – Windham Quin, 2nd Earl of Dunraven and Mount-Earl, British politician (d. 1850)
- October 3
  - Charles Jared Ingersoll, American politician and writer (d. 1862)
  - David Johnson, Governor of South Carolina (d. 1855)
  - Richard Peek, English philanthropist (d. 1867)
- October 4 – James Wadmore, English art collector (d. 1853)
- October 6
  - Isidro Barrada, Spanish military personnel (d. 1835)
  - James Gordon, British Royal Navy officer (d. 1869)
- October 7
  - John Duer, American jurist (d. 1852)
  - Charles Maclaren, Scottish journalist and geologist (d. 1866)
  - James Lucas Yeo, British naval commander (d. 1818)
- October 8 – Robert Lucas Chance, British glass maker (d. 1865)
- October 9
  - Lewis Cass, American military officer, politician, statesman (d. 1866)
  - Tilly Lynde, American politician (d. 1857)
  - William Holland Wilmer, American episcopal priest (d. 1827)
- October 11
  - Steen Steensen Blicher, Danish writer (d. 1848)
  - Christian Heinrich Bünger, German anatomist and surgeon (d. 1842)
  - Georg Andreas von Rosen, Russian army general (d. 1841)
  - Pierre-Antoine Tabeau, Canadian missionary (d. 1835)
- October 12
  - Henry Dodge, American politician and general (d. 1867)
  - Jared Groce, American planter, slaveowner and settler (d. 1836)
- October 13 – Joseph Nigg, Austrian artist (d. 1863)
- October 14 – James Gilmour, Canadian businessman (d. 1858)
- October 15 – James Elmes, English writer and architect (d. 1862)
- October 16
  - Alois Pichl, Austrian architect (d. 1856)
  - Hamelin Trelawny, British politician (d. 1856)
- October 18
  - Joseph M. Street, Iowa pioneer, trader and US Indian Agent (d. 1840)
  - Karl Friedrich Eusebius Trahndorff, German philosopher (d. 1863)
- October 19 – J. T. Wedgwood, British engraver (d. 1856)
- October 20 – Christian Blom, Norwegian composer (d. 1861)
- October 24 – William Norton Shinn, American politician (d. 1871)
- October 25
  - Iosif Ivanovich Charlemagne, Russian architect (d. 1861)
  - Levi Lincoln Jr., Massachusetts Governor and Congressman (d. 1868)
  - Sir William Verner, 1st Baronet, British politician (d. 1871)
- October 26
  - Carlo Tancredi Falletti di Barolo, Italian politician and mayor (d. 1838)
  - Charles Goodall, English cricketer (d. 1872)
- October 27 – Niccolò Paganini, Italian violinist and composer (d. 1840)
- October 28 – Henry Meigs, American politician (d. 1861)
- October 30 – Lorenzo Maria of Saint Francis Xavier, Italian saint (d. 1856)
- November 1
  - Joseph von Blumenthal, Austrian musician (d. 1850)
  - F. J. Robinson, 1st Viscount Goderich, Prime Minister of the United Kingdom (d. 1859)
  - Adam Ditlev Wedell-Wedellsborg, Dano-Norwegian government official (d. 1827)
- November 2 – Eustoquio Díaz Vélez, Spanish-Argentine general (d. 1856)
- November 3 – Lewis Warrington, United States Secretary of the Navy (d. 1851)
- November 4
  - John Branch, American politician (d. 1863)
  - Nanbu Toshitaka, Japanese samurai, 10th daimyō of Morioka Domain, northern Japan (d. 1820)
- November 6 – Maha Bandula, Burmese general (d. 1825)
- November 7
  - Friedrich Karl Gustav, Baron von Langenau, Austrian field marshal (d. 1840)
  - Edward Hawker, Royal Navy officer during the French Revolutionary Wars and Napoleonic Wars (d. 1860)
  - John Pye, English landscape engraver (d. 1874)
- November 11
  - Francis Blackburne, Lord Chancellor of Ireland (d. 1867)
  - Nathan Dunn, American collector (d. 1844)
  - Elihu Embree, American abolitionist and newspaper editor (d. 1820)
- November 12
  - William Hendricks, American politician (d. 1850)
  - Granville Proby, 3rd Earl of Carysfort, British naval commander and Whig politician (d. 1868)
  - James Wedderburn, Solicitor General for Scotland (d. 1822)
- November 13
  - Sir Alexander Grant, 8th Baronet, British politician (d. 1854)
  - Joseph Kornhäusel, Austrian architect (d. 1860)
  - Esaias Tegnér, Swedish poet, professor and bishop (d. 1846)
- November 16
  - Gilbert Elliot-Murray-Kynynmound, 2nd Earl of Minto, British politician (d. 1859)
  - Thomas Whitmore, English politician (d. 1846)
- November 17 – Conrad Graf, German piano maker (d. 1851)
- November 19 – John McCarty, American politician (d. 1851)
- November 20
  - Alexander Macdonell of Greenfield, Canadian politician and businessman (d. 1835)
  - Georgius Jacobus Johannes van Os, painter from the Northern Netherlands (d. 1861)
- November 21 – William Tippet, Anglo-Indian Judge and Magistrate (d. 1824)
- November 22
  - Richard Bagot, Bishop of Oxford, Dean of Canterbury (d. 1854)
  - Sophie Swetchine, Russian salon-holder (d. 1857)
- November 25
  - George Tillson, American industrialist (d. 1864)
  - Thomas Contee Worthington, American politician (d. 1847)
- November 26
  - Karl Johann Bernhard Karsten, German mineralogist (d. 1853)
  - Johan Christopher Ræder, Norwegian politician (d. 1853)
- November 28 – John R. Drake, American politician (d. 1857)
- November 29 – Henry Walton Ellis, British Army officer (d. 1815)
- November 30 – Giuseppe Moretti, Italian botanist (d. 1853)
- December 2 – Gerard Thomas Noel, British cleric (d. 1851)
- December 3
  - John E. Coffee, American politician (d. 1836)
  - Henry William Pickersgill, British artist (d. 1875)
- December 5
  - Martin Van Buren, 8th president of the United States (d. 1862)
  - Sir George Warrender, 4th Baronet, British politician (d. 1849)
- December 7
  - James Earickson, American politician (d. 1844)
  - Nicolaus Michael Oppel, German naturalist (d. 1820)
  - Joseph Trumbull, American politician and lawyer (d. 1861)
- December 9 – Waleria Tarnowska, Polish painter and art collector (d. 1849)
- December 10
  - Thomas William Brotherton, British general (d. 1868)
  - Charles Nicolas Fabvier, French military personnel, politician and diplomat (d. 1855)
  - Friedrich Konrad Griepenkerl, German philosopher, educationist, musicologist and musician (d. 1849)
- December 11
  - George Barnes, English archdeacon (d. 1847)
  - Johann Friedrich Müller, German copperplate engraver (d. 1816)
- December 12 – Marie-Victoire Baudry, Canadian superior general (d. 1846)
- December 13 – John Clitherow, British Army general (d. 1852)
- December 16
  - Hans Jakob Oeri, Swiss painter (d. 1868)
  - Louis-Barthélémy Pradher, French composer, pianist and music educator (d. 1843)
  - Diego Bautista Urbaneja, Venezuelan politician (d. 1856)
- December 17 – James Fullarton, Scottish soldier who fought in the Kandyan Wars (d. 1834)
- December 19 – Julius Vincenz von Krombholz, Czech botanist, surgeon, doctor and mycologist (d. 1843)
- December 21
  - Benoit Tranquille Berbiguier, French composer (d. 1838)
  - Randolph Isham Routh, British commissariat officer (d. 1858)
- December 22 – Jean Bélanger, Canadian politician (d. 1827)
- December 23
  - William Armstrong, American lawyer, civil servant, politician, businessperson (d. 1865)
  - Johann Anton Weinmann, German botanist (d. 1858)
- December 24
  - Therese Brunetti, Austrian actress (d. 1864)
  - Charles Hubert Millevoye, poet from France (d. 1816)
- December 25
  - Victory Birdseye, American politician (d. 1853)
  - Nathaniel Fish Moore, American university administrator (d. 1872)
- December 26 – Philaret Drozdov, Russian bishop (d. 1867)
- December 27
  - Samuel Hood, Anglican Dean of Argyll and The Isles (d. 1872)
  - Henry Vail, American politician (d. 1853)
- December 28
  - Joseph Arnold, English naval surgeon and naturalist (d. 1818)
  - Matthias Joseph de Noël, German writer and art collector (d. 1849)
  - Cajetan von Textor, German physician (d. 1860)
- December 29
  - François-Joseph Grille, French librarian (d. 1853)
  - William Lloyd, British army officer (d. 1857)
  - Benjamin Woodworth, American politician (d. 1874)
- December 30
  - John Freeman Milward Dovaston, British poet and naturalist (d. 1854)
  - Jonas Anton Hielm, Norwegian politician (d. 1848)
- December 31
  - Konstantin Bulgakov, Russian diplomat and postal director (d. 1835)
  - Jean-Pierre Sylvestre de Grateloup, French naturalist (d. 1861)

1783

- January 20 – Friedrich Dotzauer, German cellist, composer (d. 1860)
- January 23 – Stendhal, French writer (d. 1842)
- February 8 – Charles-Marie Denys de Damrémont, French general, governor-general of French Algeria (d. 1837)
- February 16 – Stephen Cassin, United States Navy officer (d. 1857)
- March 8 – Hannah Van Buren, née Hoes, American wife of Martin Van Buren (d. 1819)

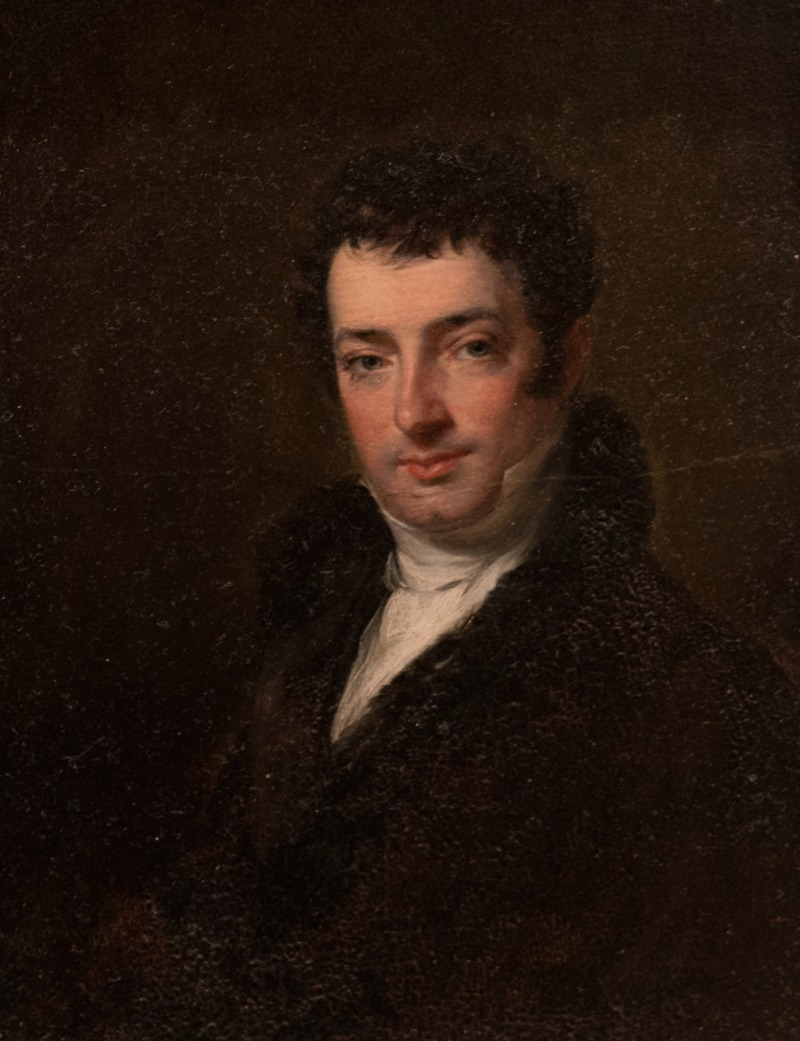
Washington Irving

- April 3 – Washington Irving, American author (d. 1859)
- April 21 – Reginald Heber, English priest (d. 1821)
- May 1 – Vicente Rocafuerte, Ecuadorian politician, 2nd President of Ecuador (d. 1847)
- May 3 – José de la Riva Agüero, Peruvian soldier and politician, 1st President of Peru and 2nd President of North Peru (d. 1858)
- May 25 – Philip P. Barbour, American politician, Associate Justice of the Supreme Court of the United States (d. 1841)

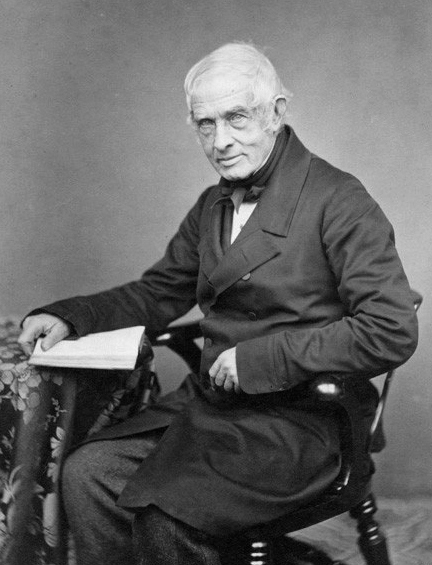
John Crawfurd

- May 27 – John Crawfurd, Scottish physician, colonial administrator, diplomat and author. Last British Resident of Singapore (d. 1868)
- May 29 – Benedetto Pistrucci, Italian engraver and medalist (d. 1855)
- June 19 – Friedrich Sertürner, German pharmacist who discovered morphine in 1804 (d. 1841)
- June 21 – Theodosia Burr Alston, First Lady of South Carolina during War of 1812, daughter of Aaron Burr (d. 1813)

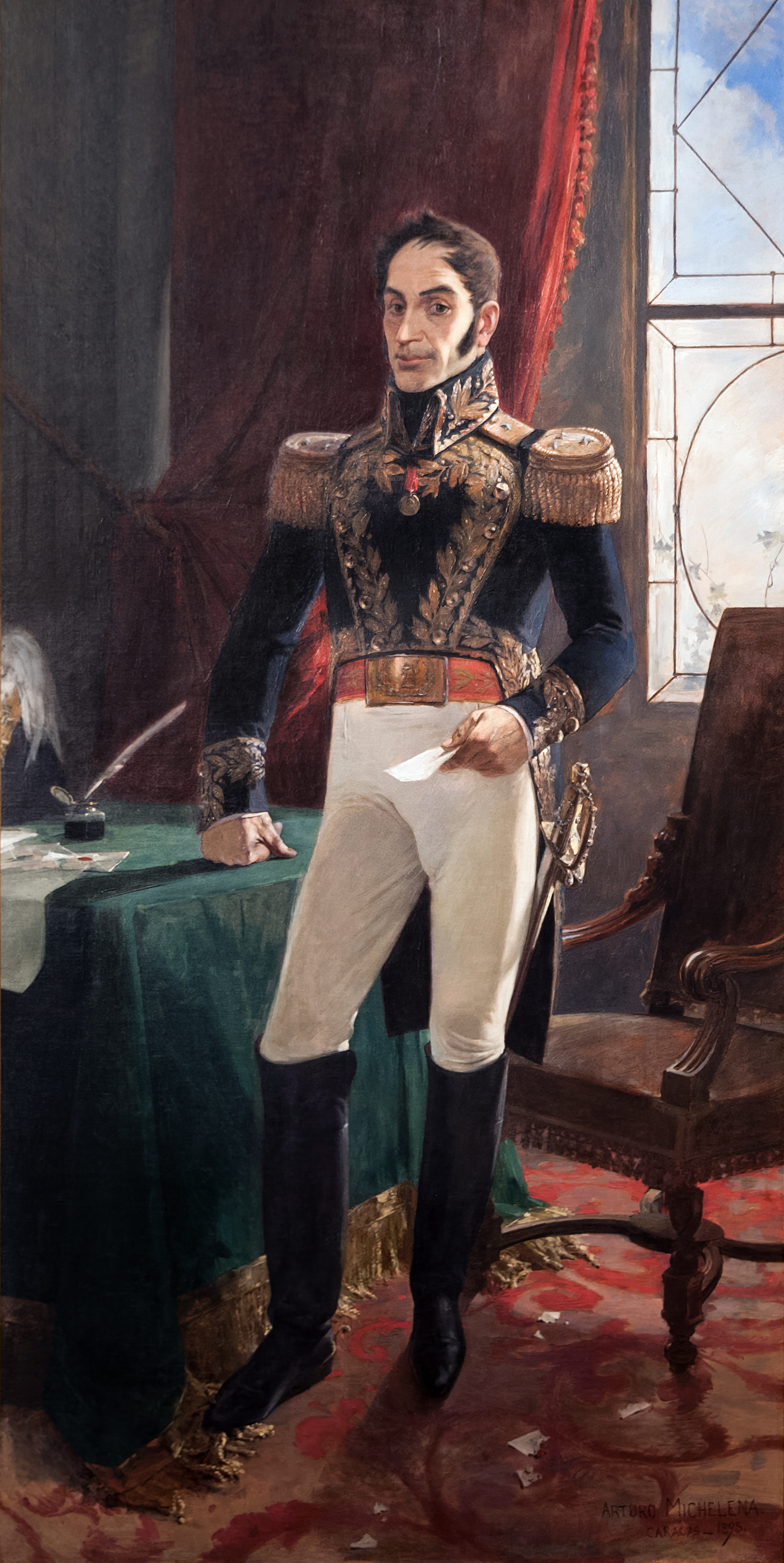
Simón Bolívar

- July 24 – Simón Bolívar, Venezuelan patriot, revolutionary leader and statesman (d. 1830)
- July 28 – Friedrich Wilhelm von Bismarck, German army officer and writer (d. 1860)
- August 7 – Princess Amelia of the United Kingdom, member of the British Royal Family (d. 1810)
- August 26 – Federigo Zuccari, astronomer, director of the Astronomical Observatory of Naples (d. 1817)
- September 17
  - Samuel Prout, English painter (d. 1852)
  - Nadezhda Durova, first female Russian army officer (d. 1866)
- October 31 – Karl Wilhelm Gottlob Kastner, German chemist (d. 1857)
- Date unknown:
  - The Two-Headed Boy of Bengal, sufferer from the rare condition Craniopagus parasiticus (d. 1787)
  - Mary Anne Whitby, English scientist (d. 1850)

1784

- January 17 – Philippe Antoine d’Ornano, Marshal of France (d. 1863)

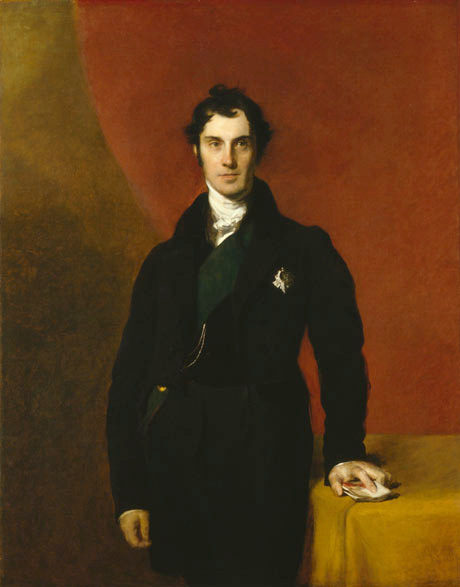
George Hamilton-Gordon, 4th Earl of Aberdeen

- January 28 – George Hamilton-Gordon, 4th Earl of Aberdeen, Prime Minister of the United Kingdom (d. 1860)
- February 5 – Nancy Hanks, mother of Abraham Lincoln (d. 1818)
- February 20 – John E. Wool, general officer in the United States Army, who served during the War of 1812, Mexican–American War, and the American Civil War (d. 1869)
- February 29 – Leo von Klenze, German neoclassicist architect, painter and writer (d. 1864)
- March 12 – William Buckland, English geologist, paleontologist (d. 1856)
- March 22 – Samuel Hunter Christie, English physicist, mathematician (d. 1865)
- March 23 – Tom Molineaux, African-American boxer (d. 1818)

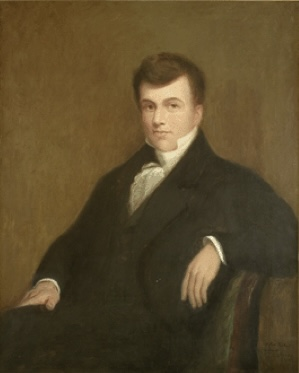
Jonathan Jennings

- March 27 – Jonathan Jennings, American politician and the first governor of Indiana (d. 1834)
- April 5 – Louis Spohr, German violinist, composer (d. 1859)
- April 13 – Friedrich Graf von Wrangel, Prussian field marshal (d. 1877)
- April 24 – Peter Vivian Daniel, Associate Justice of the Supreme Court of the United States (d. 1860)
- June 24 – Juan Antonio Lavalleja, Uruguayan military, political figure (d. 1853)
- July 21 – Charles Baudin, French admiral (d. 1854)
- July 22 – Friedrich Bessel, German mathematician, astronomer (d. 1846)
- July 27 – Denis Davydov, Russian general, poet (d. 1839)
- August 18 – Robert Taylor, British Radical writer, freethought advocate (d. 1844)
- September 4 – William Pope Duval, first civilian governor of the Florida Territory (d. 1854)
- October 13 – King Ferdinand VII of Spain (d. 1833)
- October 15 – Thomas Robert Bugeaud, Marshal of France and duke of Isly (d. 1849)
- October 19
  - Leigh Hunt, British critic, essayist (d. 1859)
  - John McLoughlin, Canadian fur trader (d. 1857)

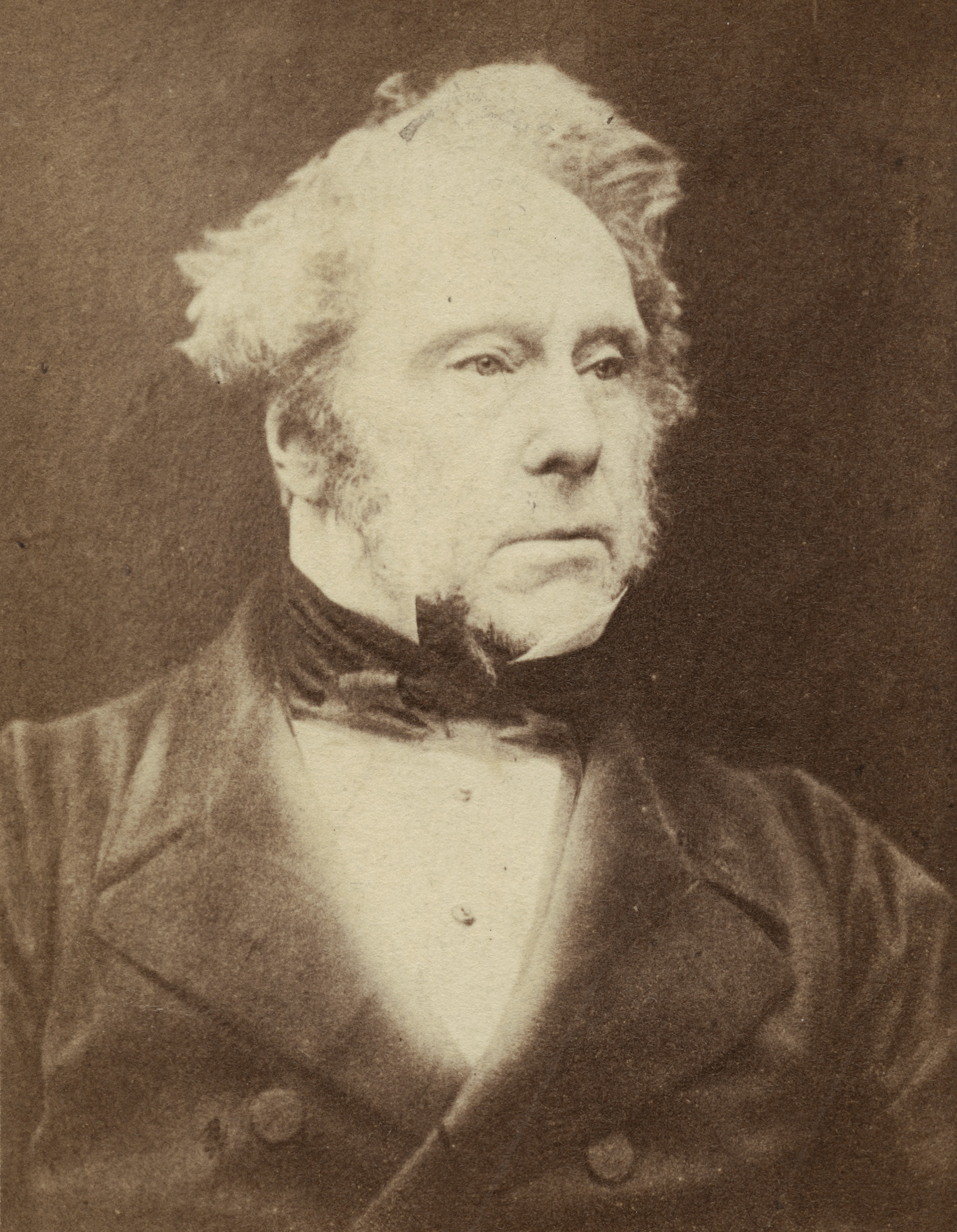
Henry Temple, 3rd Viscount Palmerston

- October 20 – Henry Temple, 3rd Viscount Palmerston, Prime Minister of the United Kingdom (d. 1865)
- October – Sarah Biffen, armless English painter (d. 1850)
- November 24 – Zachary Taylor, 12th President of the United States (d. 1850)
- November 27 – August, Prince of Hohenlohe-Öhringen (d. 1853)

1785

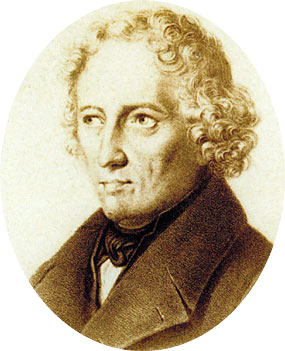
Jacob Grimm

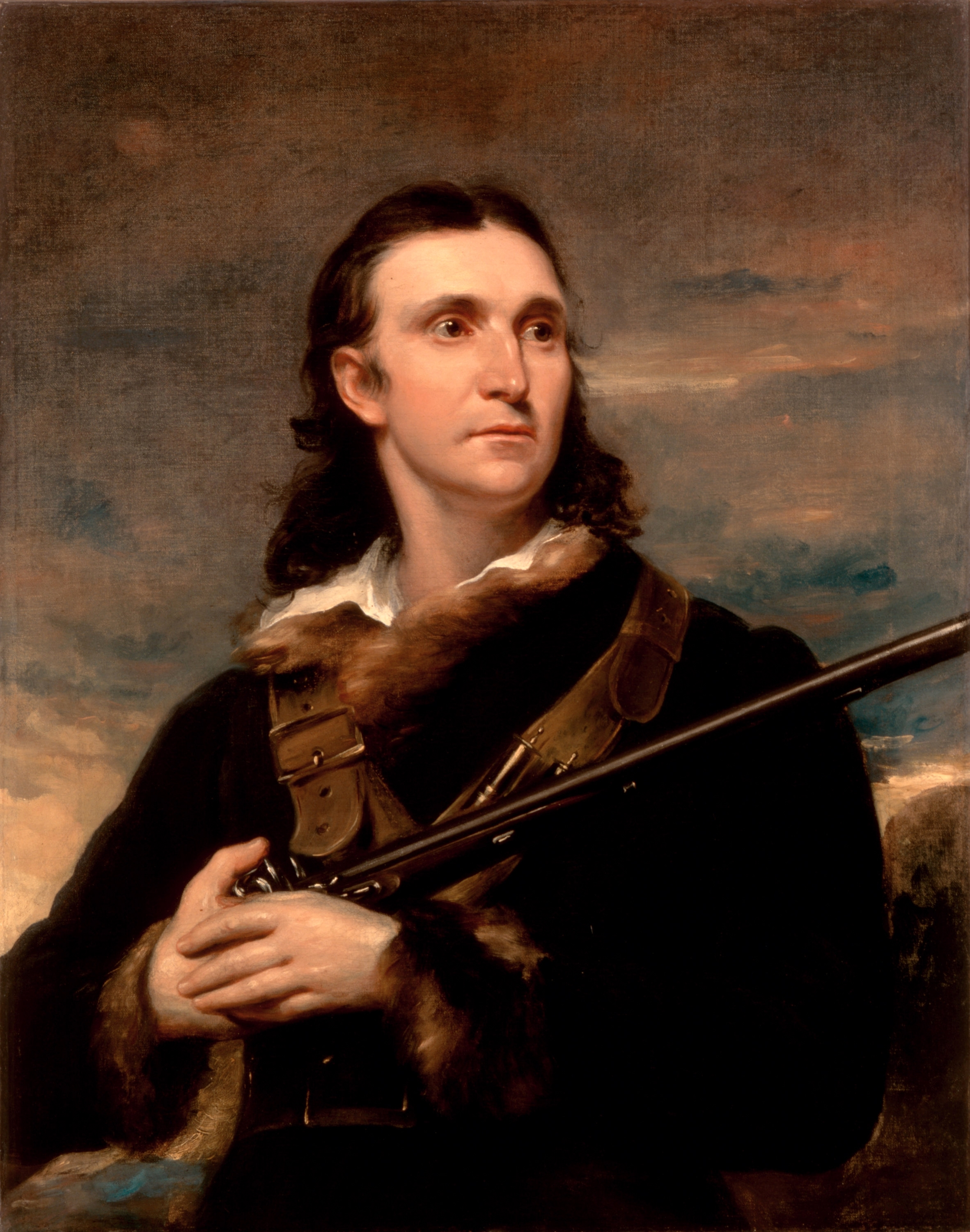
John James Audubon

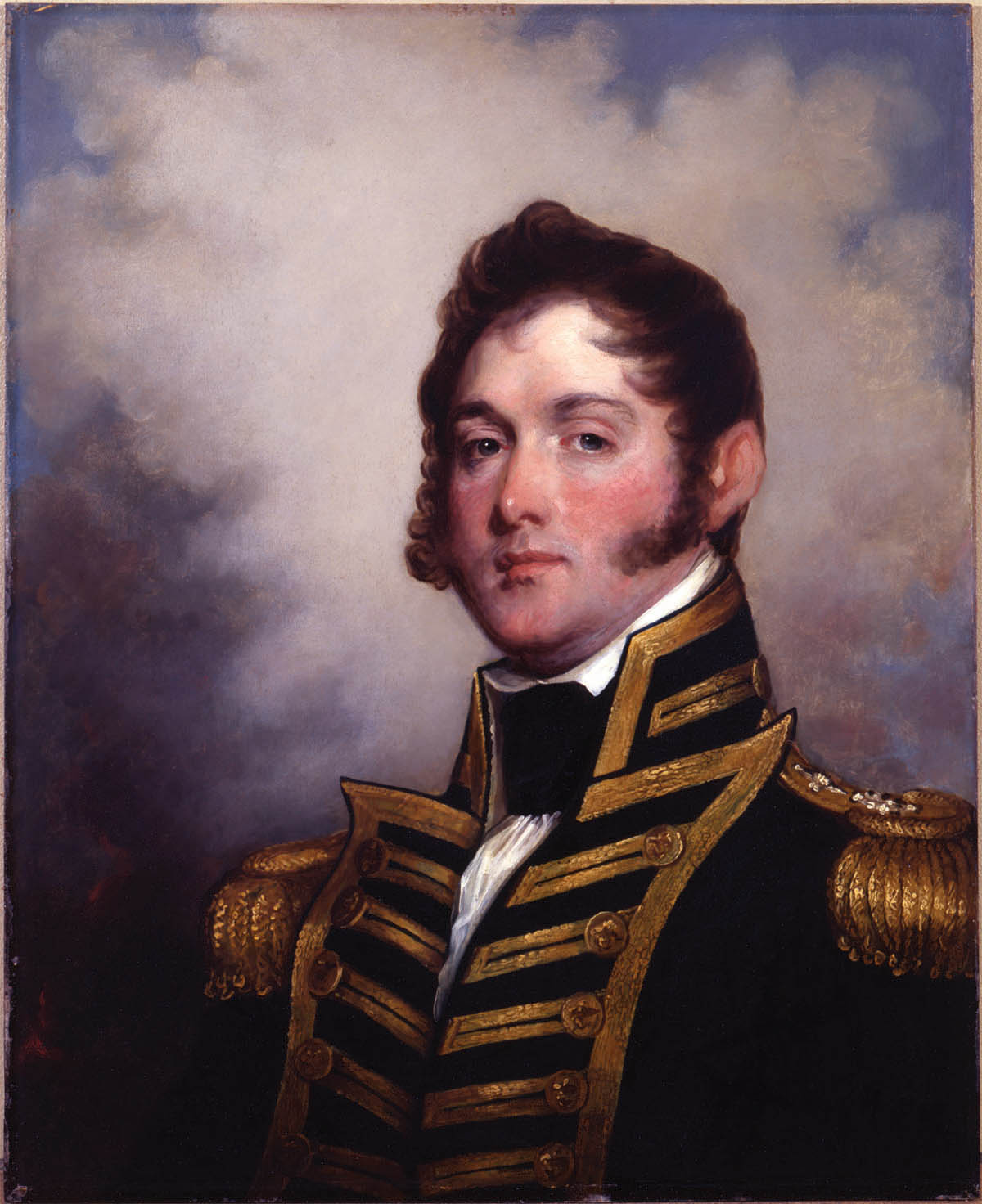
Oliver Hazard Perry

- January 4
  - Jacob Grimm, German philologist, folklorist, and writer (d. 1863)
  - Friedrich Wilhelm, Duke of Schleswig-Holstein-Sonderburg-Glücksburg (d. 1831)
- January 15 – William Prout English chemist, physician, and natural theologian (d. 1850)
- January 20 – Theodor Grotthuss, German-Lithuanian chemist (d. 1822)
- February 8 – Martín Miguel de Güemes Argentine military leader (d. 1821)
- February 10 – Claude-Louis Navier, French engineer, physicist (d. 1836)
- February 26 – Anna Sundström, Swedish chemist (d. 1871)
- March 11
  - John McLean, American politician, Associate Justice of the Supreme Court of the United States (d. 1861)
  - Eleonore Prochaska, German heroine soldier (d. 1805)
- March 17 – Ellen Hutchins, Irish botanist (d. 1815)
- March 27 – Louis XVII of France (d. 1795)
- April 4 – Bettina von Arnim, German poet (d. 1859)
- April 26 – John James Audubon, French-American naturalist, illustrator (d. 1851)
- April 29 – Karl Drais, German inventor, creator of a precursor to the bicycle (d. 1851)
- May 18 – John Wilson, Scottish writer (d. 1854)
- May 20 – Marcellin Champagnat, French Catholic saint (d. 1840)
- May 22 – John Hindmarsh, English naval officer, first Governor of South Australia (d. 1860)
- July 6 – William Jackson Hooker, English botanist (d. 1865)
- July 20 – Mahmud II, Ottoman sultan (d. 1839)
- August 15 – Thomas de Quincey, English writer (d. 1859)
- August 23 – Oliver Hazard Perry, American naval officer (d. 1819)
- August 27 – Agustín Gamarra, Peruvian general and politician, 10th and 14th President of Peru (d. 1841)
- September 27 – David Walker, African-American abolitionist (d. 1830)
- October 15 – José Miguel Carrera, Chilean general, founding father (d. 1821)
- October 17 – Gunatitanand Swami, born Mulji Sharma, Indian paramahamsa of the Hindu Swaminarayan Sampraday sect (d. 1867)
- October 18 – Thomas Love Peacock, English satirist (d. 1866)
- October 20 – George Ormerod, English historian and antiquarian (d. 1873)
- November 11 – Diponegoro, Javanese Prince (d. 1855)
- November 18 – David Wilkie, Scottish painter (d. 1841)
- November 21 – William Beaumont, American physician and surgeon (d. 1853)
- November 28 – Victor de Broglie, Prime Minister of France (d. 1870)
- December 17 – Dorothea Lieven, Latvian diplomat, politically active princess (d. 1857)
- December 23 – Christian Gobrecht, American engraver, designer of the United States Seated Liberty coinage (d. 1844)
- December 26 – Étienne Constantin de Gerlache, 1st Prime Minister of Belgium (d. 1871)

1786

- January 7 – John Catron, Associate Justice of the Supreme Court of the United States (d. 1865)
- January 8 – Nicholas Biddle, President of the Second Bank of the United States (d. 1844)
- January 11 – Joseph Jackson Lister, English opticist, physician (d. 1869)
- January 12 – Sir Robert Inglis, Bt, English politician (d. 1855)
- January 23 – Auguste de Montferrand, French architect (d. 1858)

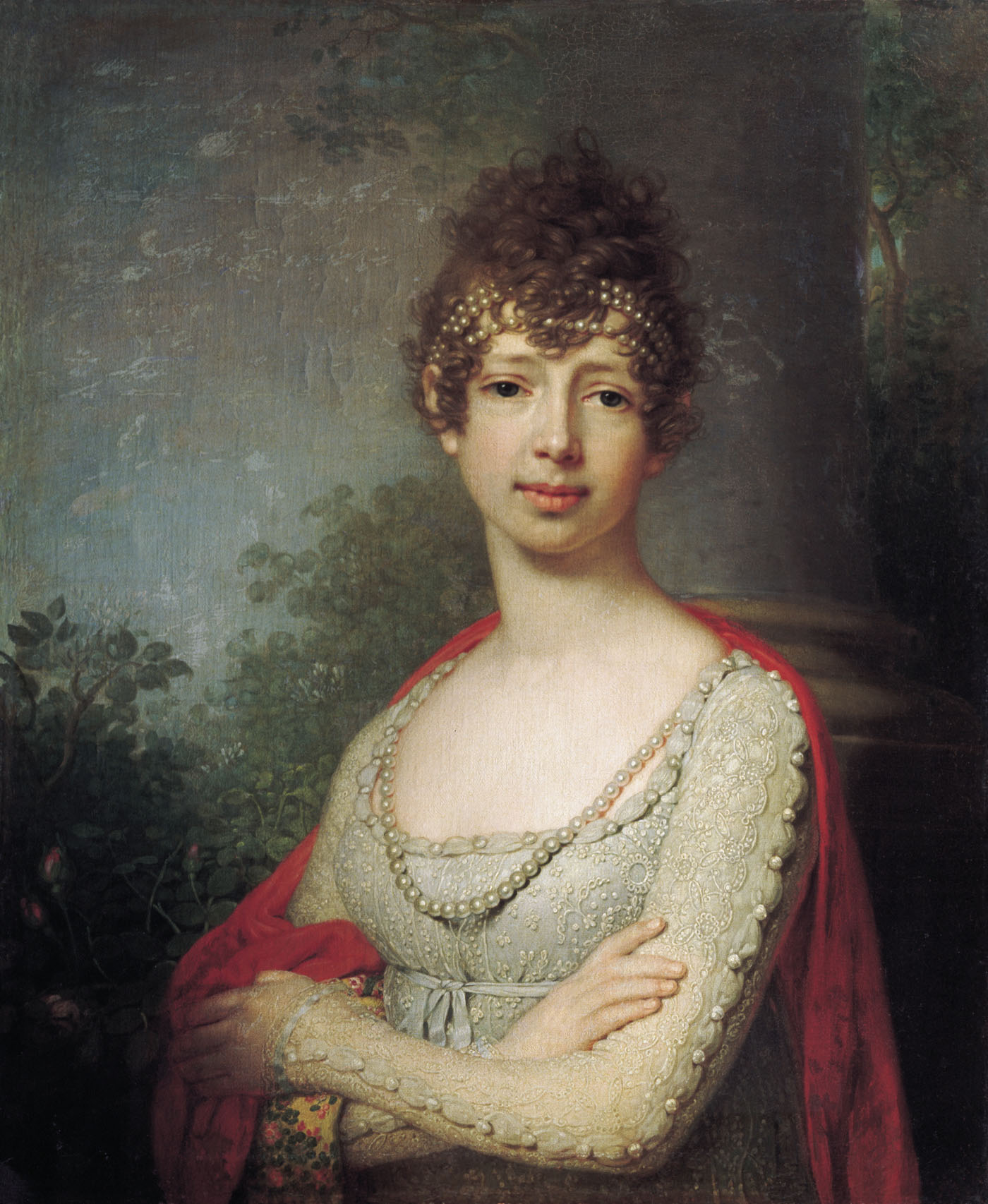
Maria Pavlovna of Russia

- February 16 – Maria Pavlovna of Russia, Grand Duchess of Saxe-Weimar Eisenach (d. 1859)
- February 26 – François Arago, French astronomer, physicist and politician (d. 1853)
- February 24 – Wilhelm Grimm, German philologist and folklorist (d. 1859)
- March 4 – Agustina de Aragón, Spanish heroine (d. 1857)
- March 22 – Joachim Lelewel, Polish historian (d. 1861)
- March 25 – Giovanni Battista Amici, Italian astronomer, microscopist and botanist (d. 1863)
- April 16 – John Franklin, British naval officer and explorer (d. 1847)
- April 28 – Elizabeth Andrew Warren, Cornish botanist, marine algolologist (d. 1864)
- May 29 – Alexander Bryan Johnson, American philosopher (d. 1867)
- June 13 – Winfield Scott, American general, presidential candidate (d. 1866)
- June 26 – Sunthorn Phu, Thai poet (d. 1855)

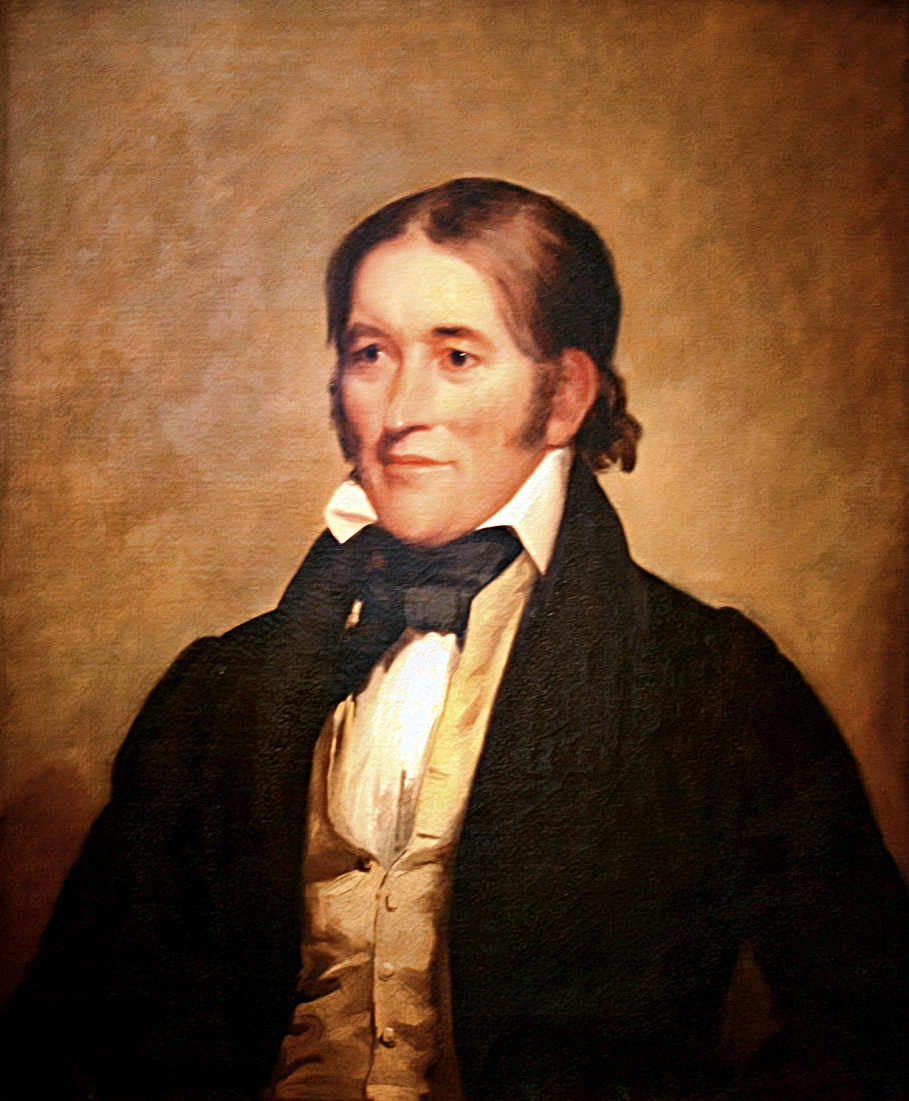
Davy Crockett

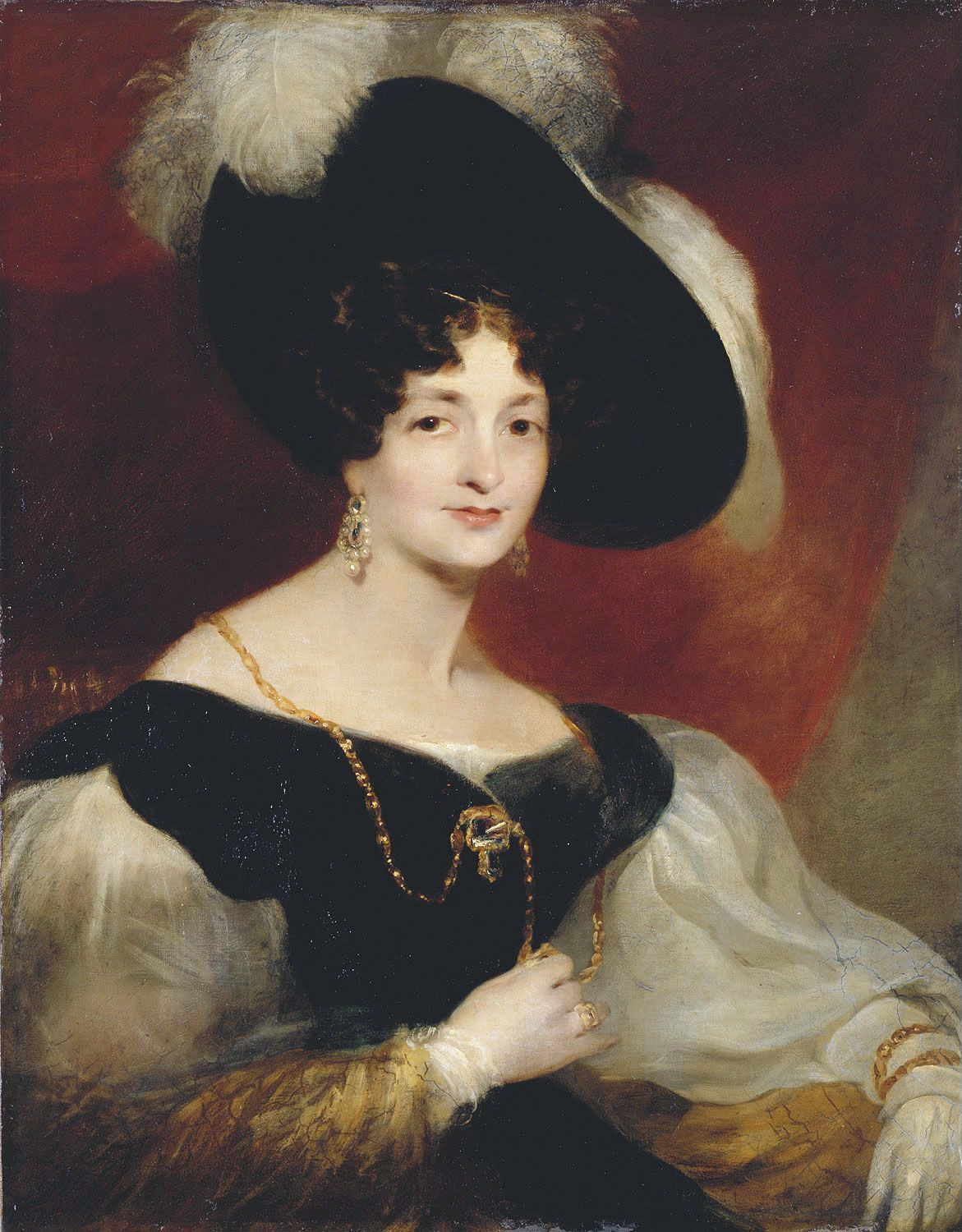
Princess Victoria of Saxe-Coburg-Saalfeld

- August 17
  - Davy Crockett, American frontiersman (d. 1836)
  - Princess Victoria of Saxe-Coburg-Saalfeld, mother of Queen Victoria (d. 1861)
- August 25 – King Ludwig I of Bavaria (d. 1868)
- August 31 – Michel Eugène Chevreul, French chemist (d. 1889)
- September 10 - Nicolás Bravo, 3-time President of Mexico (d. 1854)
- September 11 - Friedrich Kuhlau, German composer (d. 1832)
- September 18
  - King Christian VIII of Denmark (d. 1848)
  - Justinus Kerner, German physician (d. 1862)
- September 24 – Charles Bianconi, Italian-Irish entrepreneur (d. 1875)
- September 29 – Guadalupe Victoria, 1st President of Mexico (d. 1843)
- November 18
  - Henry Bishop, English composer (d. 1855)
  - Carl Maria von Weber, German composer (d. 1826)
- December 12 – William L. Marcy, American statesman (d. 1857)
- Kim Jeong-hui, Korean epigrapher (d. 1856)
- probable – Moshoeshoe I of Lesotho (d. 1870)

1787

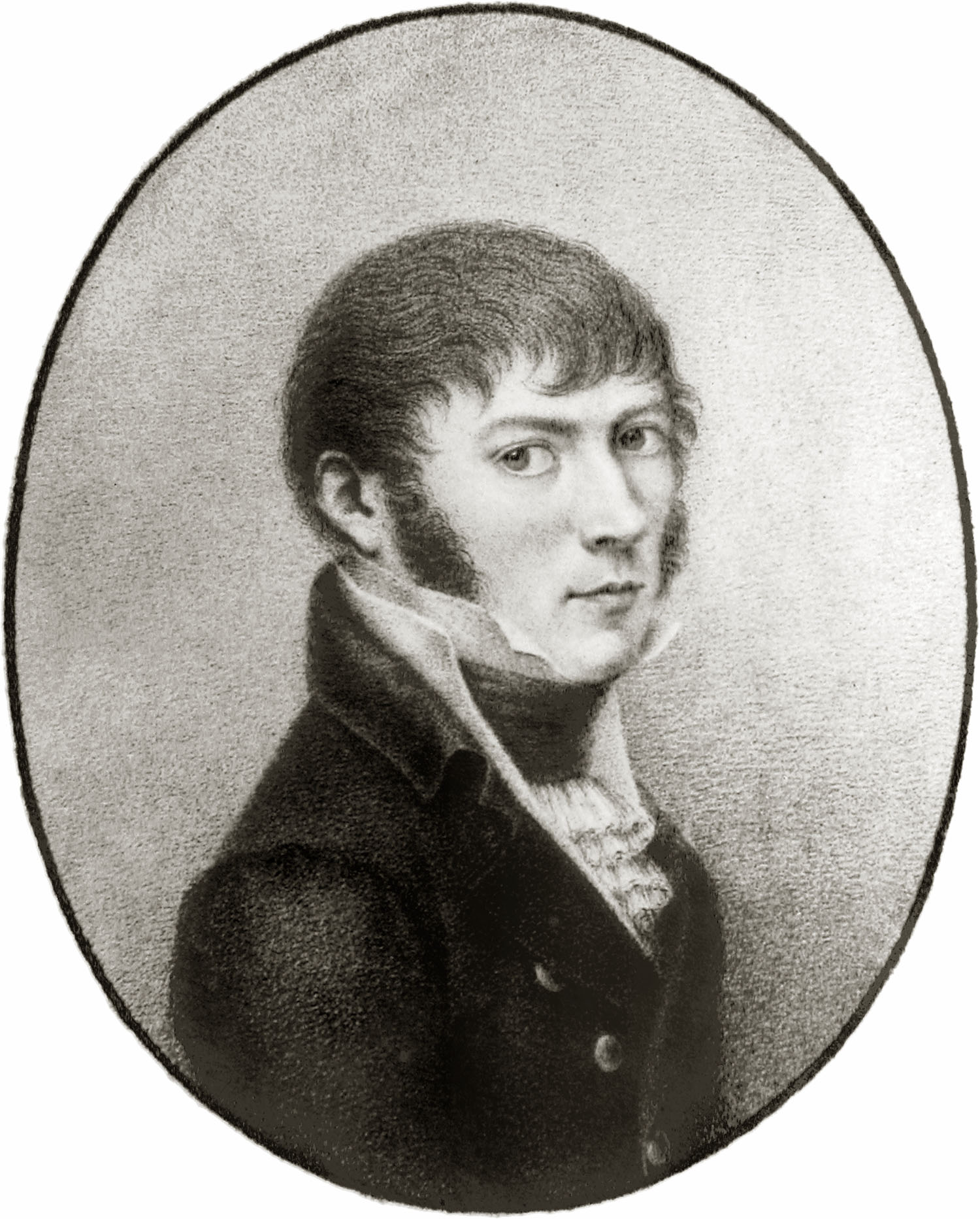
Joseph von Fraunhofer

- January 1 – Manuel José Arce, Revolutionary General and first President of The Federal Republic of Central America (d. 1847)
- February 10 – William Bradley, Britain's tallest man ever at 7 ft 9 in. (d. 1820)
- February 23 – Emma Willard, American educator (d. 1870)
- March 6 – Joseph von Fraunhofer, German optician (d. 1826)
- March 9 – Josephine Kablick, Czech botanist, paleontologist (d. 1863)
- March 10 – Francisco de Paula Martínez de la Rosa y Berdejo, Prime Minister of Spain (d. 1862)
- March 11 – Ivan Nabokov, Russian General (d. 1852)
- March 18 – Pieter Merkus, Governor-General of the Dutch East Indies (d. 1844)
- April 26 – Ludwig Uhland, German poet (d. 1862)
- May 25 – José María Bocanegra, 3rd President of Mexico (d. 1862)
- June 28 – Sir Harry Smith, English soldier, military commander (d. 1860)
- July 28 – Pedro Vélez, Mexican politician (d. 1848)
- August 21 – John Owen, 24th Governor of North Carolina (d. 1841)
- August 24 – James Weddell, British sailor known for discovering the Weddell Sea (d. 1834)
- September 5 – François Sulpice Beudant, French mineralogist, geologist (d. 1850)
- October 4, – François Guizot, Prime Minister of France (d. 1874)
- November 4 – Edmund Kean, English actor (d. 1833)
- November 7
  - Carl Carl, Polish-born actor and theatre director (d. 1854)
  - Vuk Stefanović Karadžić, Serbian linguist, major reformer of the Serbian language (d. 1864)

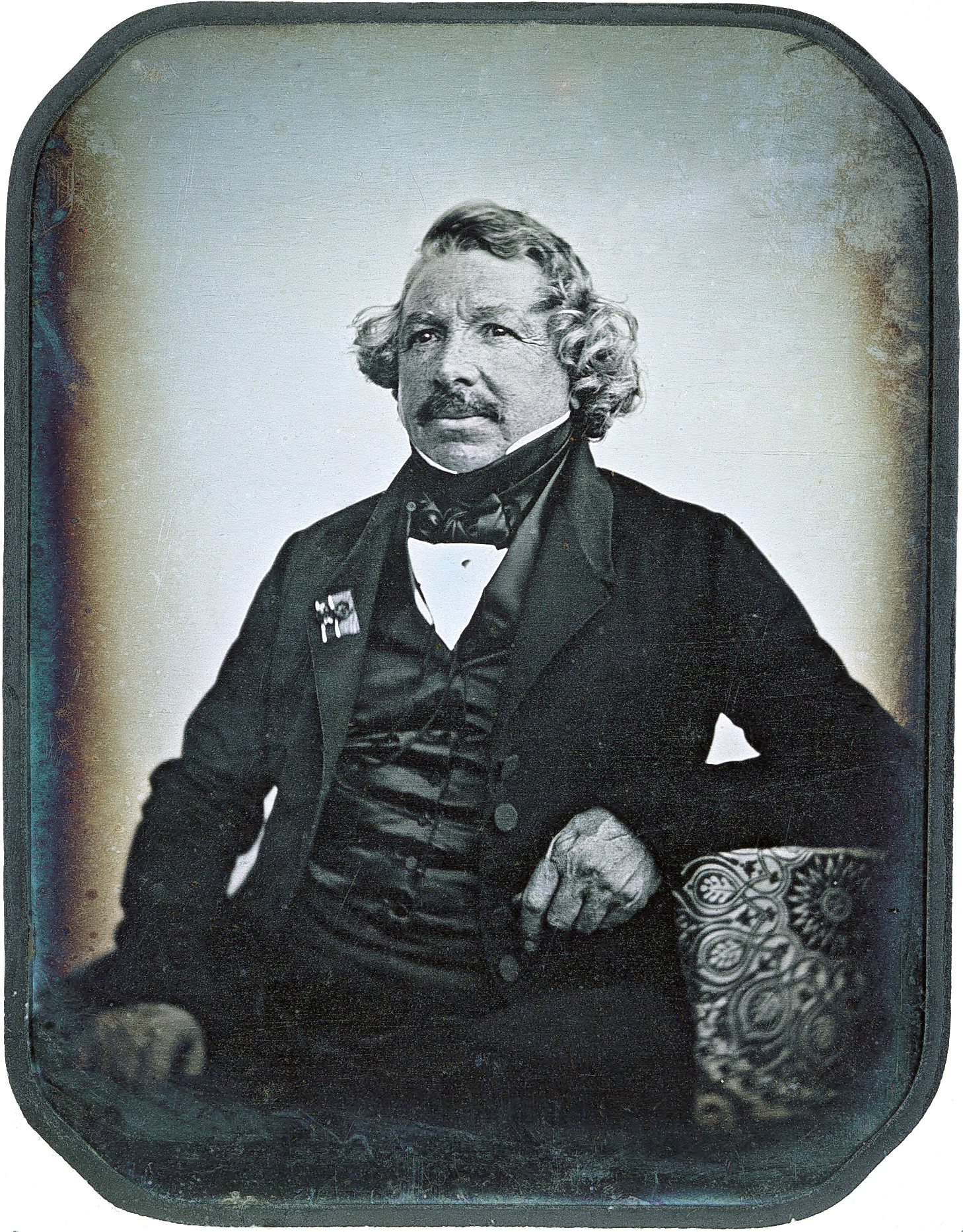
Louis Daguerre

- November 18 – Louis Daguerre, French artist, chemist (d. 1851)
- November 21 – Samuel Cunard, Canadian business, prominent Nova Scotian, founder of the Cunard Line (d. 1865)
- November 25 – Franz Xaver Gruber, Austrian composer (d. 1863)
- December 10 – Thomas Hopkins Gallaudet, American educator (d. 1851)
- December 11 – Macacha Güemes, Argentine heroine (d. 1866)
- December 16 – Mary Russell Mitford, English novelist and dramatist (d. 1855)
- December 17 – Jan Evangelista Purkyne, Czech anatomist, botanist (d. 1869)
- Juana Galán, Spanish heroine (d. 1812)
- Shaka, Zulu king (d. 1828)

1788

- January 22 – George Gordon Byron, 6th Baron Byron, English poet (d. 1824)
- February 5 – Robert Peel, Prime Minister of the United Kingdom (d. 1850)
- February 10 – Johann Peter Pixis, German pianist, composer (d. 1874)
- February 12 – Carl Reichenbach, German chemist (d. 1869)

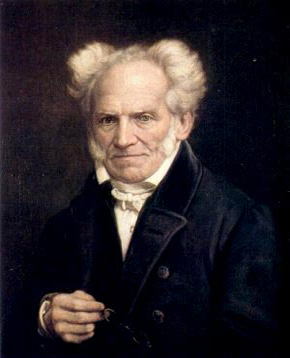
Arthur Schopenhauer

- February 22 – Arthur Schopenhauer, German philosopher (d. 1860)

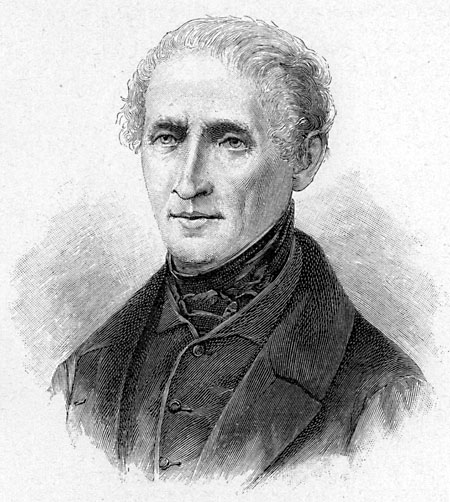
Joseph Eichendorff

- March 10 – Joseph von Eichendorff, German poet (d. 1857)
- April 2
  - Francisco Balagtas, Filipino poet (d. 1862)
  - Wilhelmine Reichard, first German woman balloonist (d. 1848)
- April 14 – David G. Burnet, President of the Republic of Texas (d. 1870)
- April 18 – Charlotte Murchison, Scottish geologist (d. 1869)

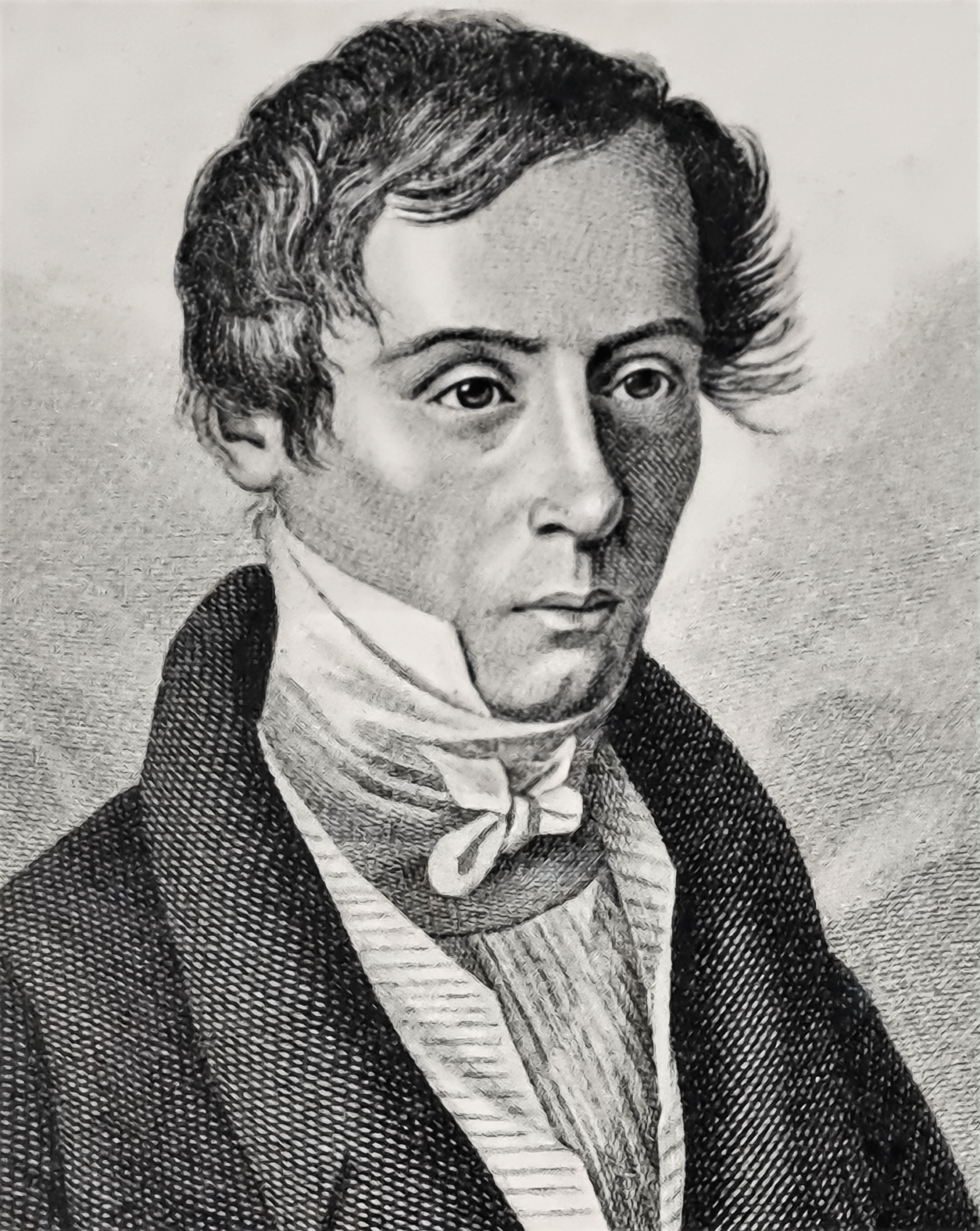
Augustin-Jean Fresnel

- May 10 – Augustin-Jean Fresnel, French engineer, physicist and inventor (d. 1827)
- May 16 – Friedrich Rückert, German poet, translator, and professor of Oriental languages (d. 1866)
- May 22 – William Grant Broughton, first Anglican bishop in Australia (d. 1853)
- June 8 – Charles A. Wickliffe, American politician, 14th Governor of Kentucky (d. 1869)
- June 21 – Princess Augusta of Bavaria, Duchess of Leuchtenberg (d. 1851)
- July 30 – Kisamor, Swedish natural healer (d. 1842)
- August 2 – Leopold Gmelin, German chemist (d. 1853)
- August 6 – Felix Slade, English lawyer, philanthropist and art collector (d. 1868)
- August 7 – Francis R. Shunk, American politician (d. 1848)
- August 15 – Carel Sirardus Willem van Hogendorp, Acting Governor-General of the Dutch East Indies (d. 1856)
- August 16 – Luigi Ciacchi, Italian cardinal (d. 1865)
- September 12 – Alexander Campbell, Irish-born founder of the Disciples of Christ (d. 1866)
- September 15 – Gerard C. Brandon, American politician (d. 1850)
- September 12 – Charlotte von Siebold, German gynecologist (d. 1859)
- September 21
  - Geert Adriaans Boomgaard, Dutch citizen, first validated supercentenarian (d. 1899)
  - Margaret Taylor, First Lady of the United States (d. 1852)
- September 22
  - Theodore Edward Hook, English author (d. 1841)
  - Louis-Étienne Saint-Denis, Arab-French memoir writer and servant to Napoleon I (d. 1856)
- September 28 – Jakob Walter, German stonemason, soldier (d. 1864)
- October 9 – József Kossics, Hungarian-Slovene Catholic priest, writer, ethnologist (d. 1867)
- October 11 – Simon Sechter, Austrian music teacher (d. 1867)
- October 24 – Sarah Josepha Hale, American author (d. 1879)
- October 31 – David R. Porter, American politician (d. 1867)
- November 8 – Mihály Bertalanits, Hungarian Slovene (Prekmurje Slovene) poet, teacher (d. 1853)
- Date unknown
  - Facundo Quiroga, Argentine federationalist (d. 1835)
  - Ana Joaquina dos Santos e Silva, African businesswoman (d. 1859)

1789

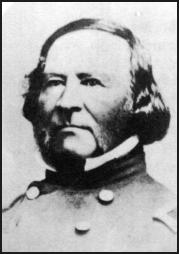
René Edward De Russy

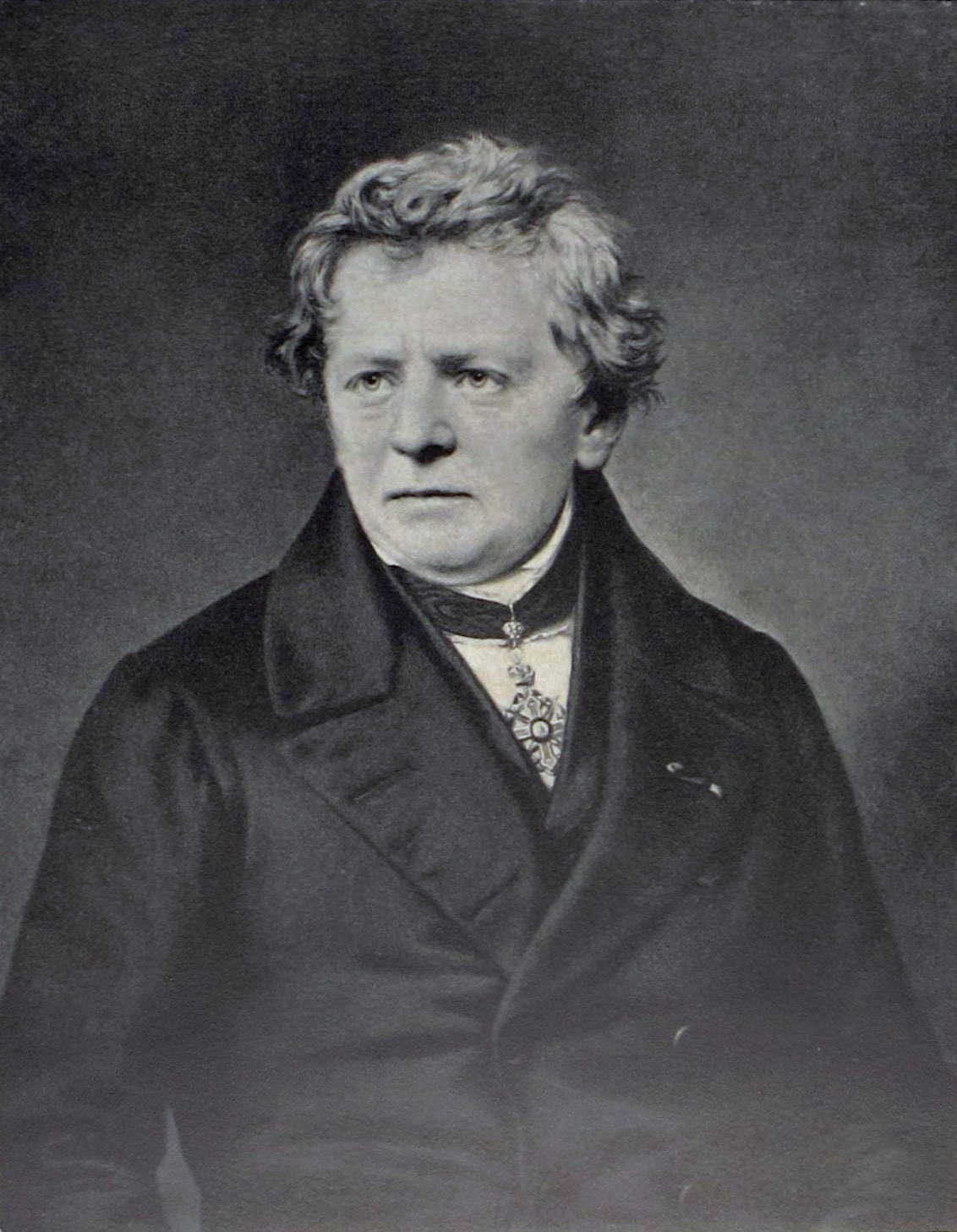
Georg Ohm

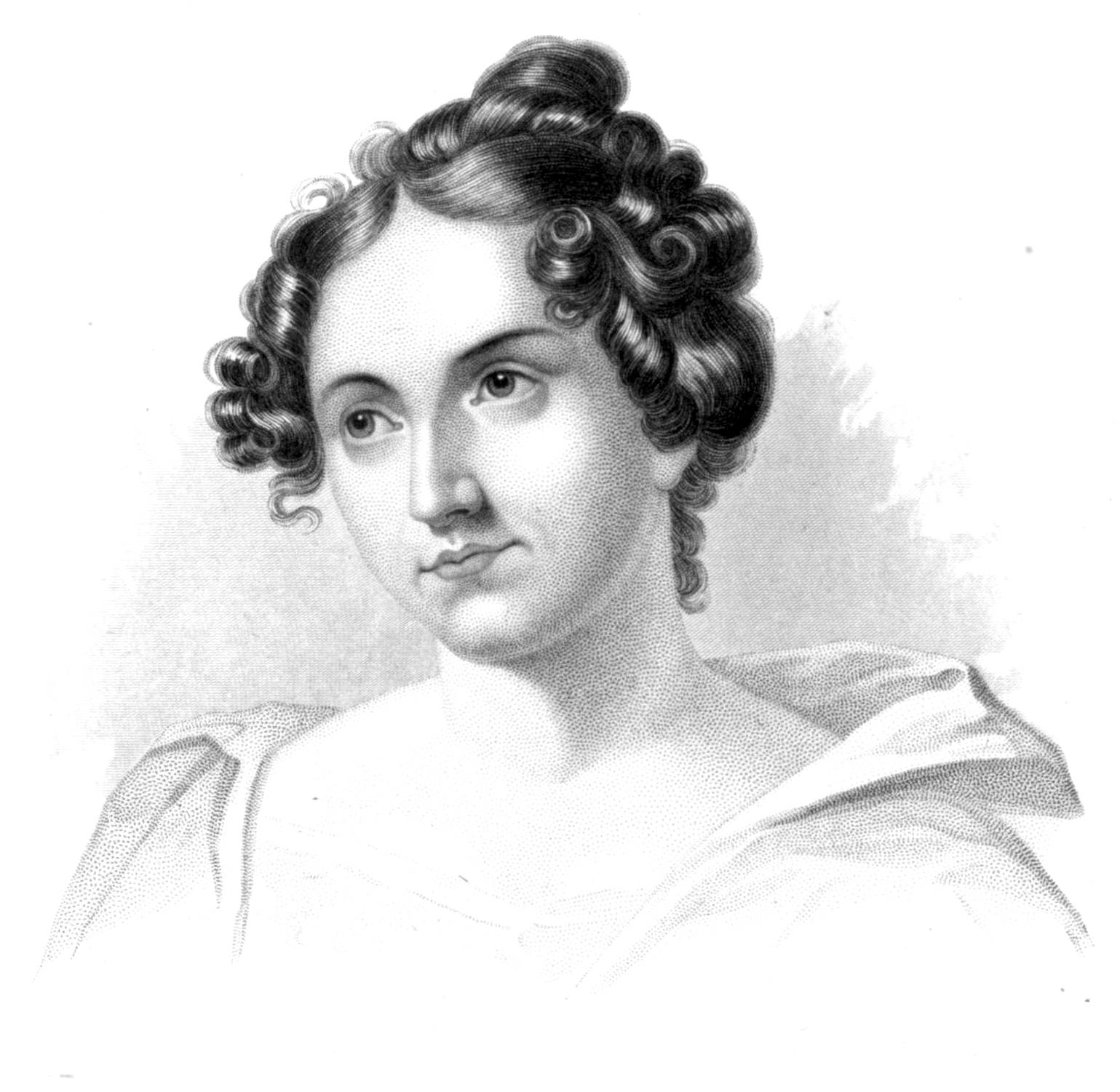
Catharine Sedgwick

- January 3 – Carl Gustav Carus, German physiologist (d. 1869)
- January 4 – Benjamin Lundy, American abolitionist (d. 1839)
- January 12 – Ettore Perrone di San Martino, prime minister of Sardinia (d. 1849)
- January 21 – William Machin Stairs, Canadian businessman and statesman (d. 1865)
- February 15 – Martin Chester Deming, American businessman and politician (d. 1851)
- February 22 – René Edward De Russy, Brigadier General of the United States Army, Superintendent of the United States Military Academy and military engineer (d. 1865)
- March 16 – Georg Ohm, German physicist (d. 1854)
- April 15 – Diego Noboa, 4th President of Ecuador (d. 1870)
- April 22
  - Manuel Gómez Pedraza, 6th President of Mexico (d. 1851)
  - Richard Roberts, Welsh-born mechanical engineer and inventor (d. 1864)
- May 1 – George Fife Angas, English coachbuilder, businessman and politician; founder of South Australia (d. 1879)
- May 24 – Cathinka Buchwieser, German operatic soprano and actress (d. 1828)
- June 8 – Queen Sunwon, Korean regent (d. 1857)
- June 18 – William Rowan, British field marshal (d. 1879)
- June 30 – Horace Vernet, French painter (d. 1863)
- July 19 – John Martin, English painter (d. 1854)
- July 21 – Vasil Aprilov, Bulgarian educator, merchant and writer (d. 1847)
- August 6 – Friedrich List, German journalist (d. 1846)
- August 21 – Augustin-Louis Cauchy, French mathematician (d. 1857)
- August 28 – Stéphanie de Beauharnais, Grand Duchess of Baden (d. 1860)
- September 3 – Hannah Flagg Gould, American poet (d. 1865)
- September 4 – Charles Gaudichaud-Beaupré, French botanist (d. 1854)
- September 15 – James Fenimore Cooper, American writer (d. 1851)
- September 28 – Richard Bright, English physician, "Father of Nephrology" (d. 1858)
- October 8 – William Swainson, English naturalist, artist (d. 1855)
- October 23 – Jean Chrétien Baud, Governor-General of the Dutch East Indies (d. 1859)
- November 5 – William Bland, Australian politician (d. 1868)
- December 14 – Maria Szymanowska, Polish composer (d. 1831)
- December 15
  - Edward B. Dudley, North Carolina governor (d. 1855)
  - Carlos Soublette, two-time President of Venezuela (d. 1870)
- December 22 – Levi Woodbury, American politician, Associate Justice of the Supreme Court of the United States (d. 1851)
- December 25 – Elizabeth Jesser Reid, English social reformer, founder of Bedford College (d. 1866)
- December 28 – Catharine Sedgwick, American novelist (d. 1867)

== Deaths ==
1780

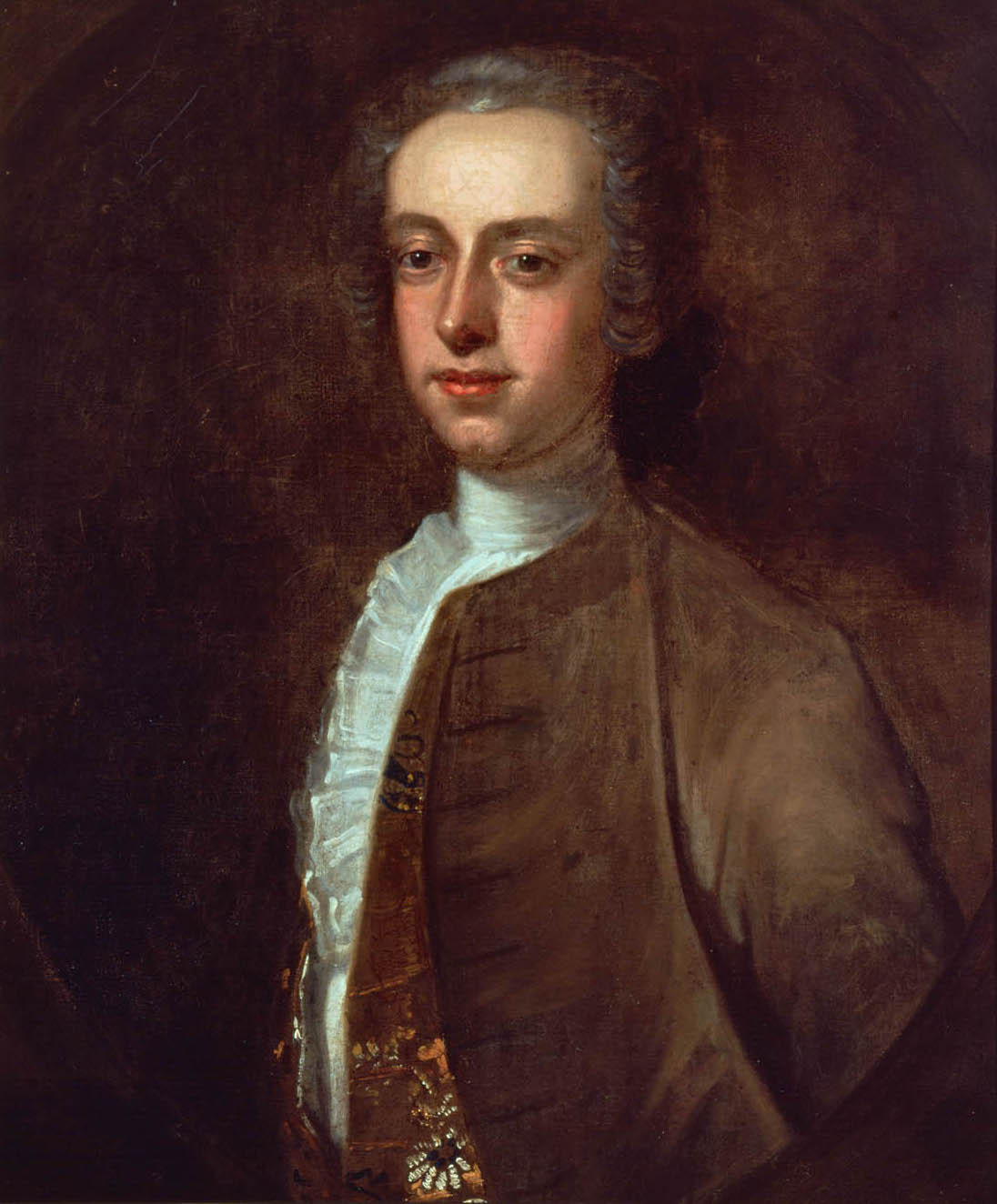
Thomas Hutchinson

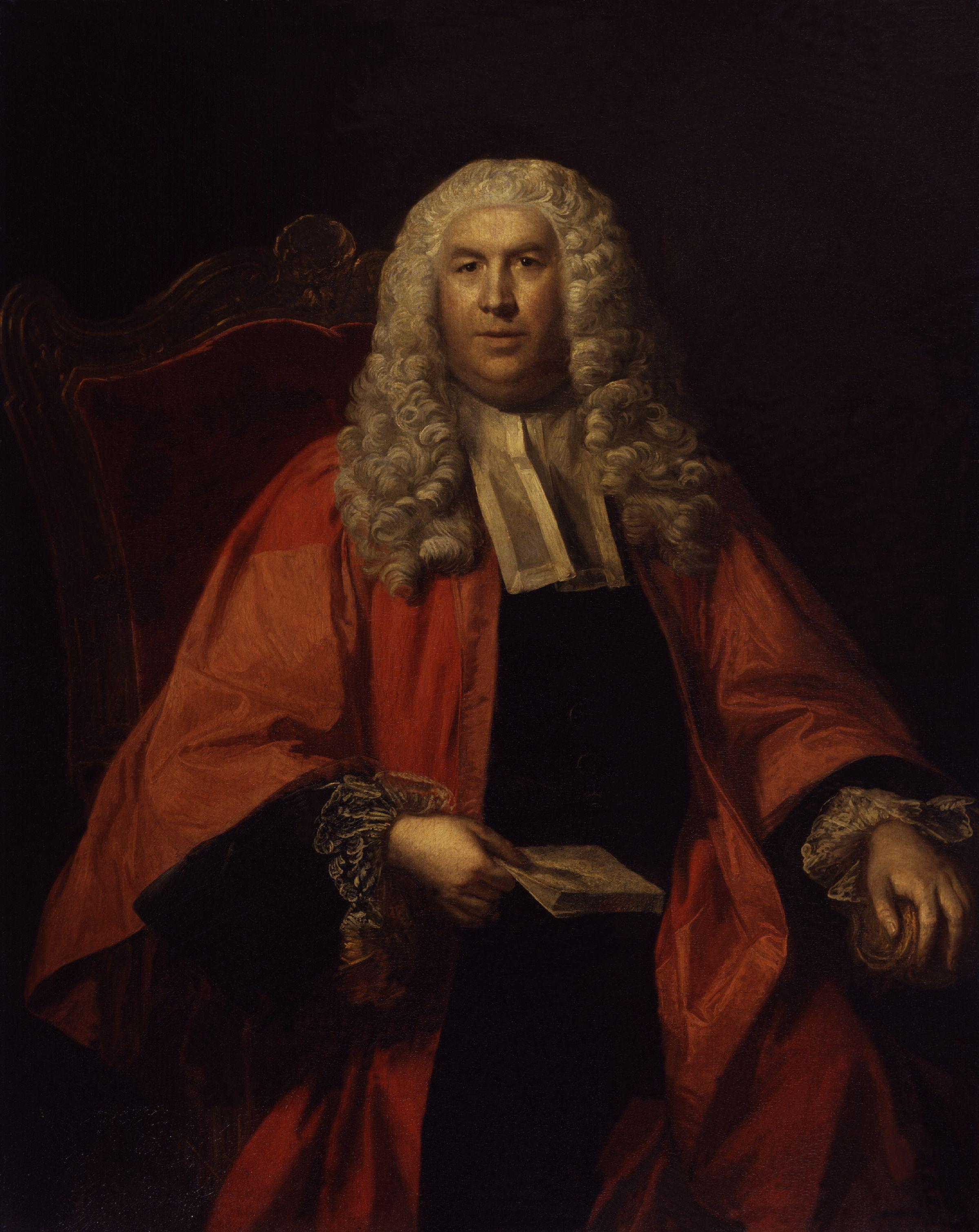
William Blackstone

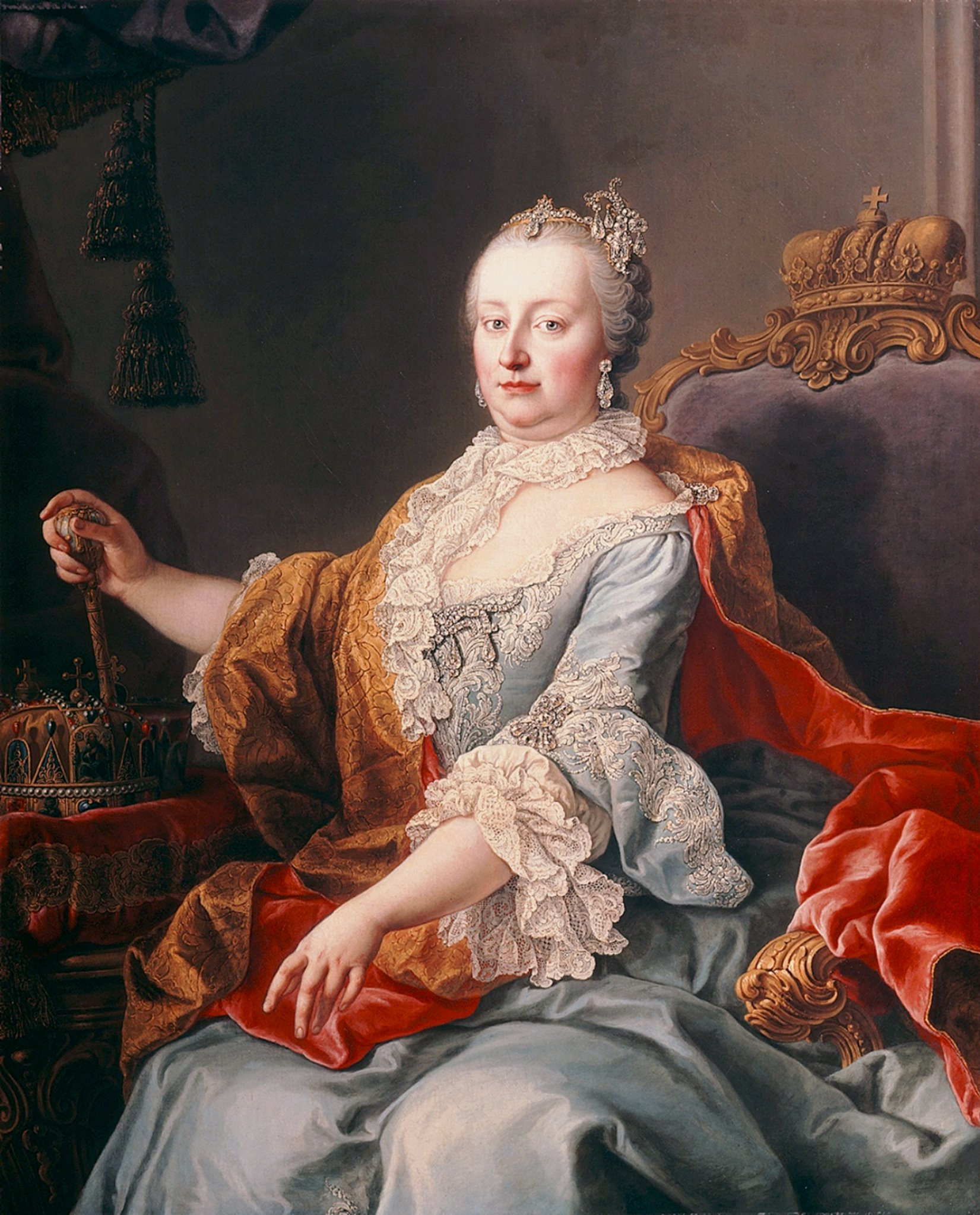
Empress Maria Theresa

- January 13 – Duchess Luise of Brunswick-Wolfenbüttel, Prussian princess (b. 1722)
- January 15 – Johann Rudolf Tschiffeli, Swiss agronomist (b. 1716)
- February 10 – Samuel Egerton, British Member of Parliament (b. 1711)
- February 14 – William Blackstone, English jurist (b. 1723)
- February 17 – Andreas Felix von Oefele, German historian, librarian (b. 1706)
- February 18 – Kristijonas Donelaitis, Lithuanian poet (b. 1714)
- March 17 – Elizabeth Butchill, English woman executed for the murder of her newborn child (b. c. 1758)
- March 26 – Charles I, Duke of Brunswick-Wolfenbüttel (b. 1713)
- April 5 – Ulrika Strömfelt, Swedish courtier (b. 1724)
- May 18 – Charles Hardy, British governor of Newfoundland (b. c. 1714)
- May 21 – Thomas Townshend (MP), British politician (b. 1701)
- June 3 – Thomas Hutchinson, American colonial governor of Massachusetts (b. 1711)
- July 4 – Prince Charles Alexander of Lorraine, Austrian military leader (b. 1712)
- July 14 – Charles Batteux, French philosopher (b. 1713)
- July 18 – Gerhard Schøning, Norwegian historian (b. 1722)
- July 21 – Louis Legrand, French Sulpician priest and theologian (b. 1711)
- August 3 – Étienne Bonnot de Condillac, French philosopher (b. 1715)
- August 19 – Johann de Kalb, Bavarian-French military officer who served as a major general in the Continental Army during the American Revolutionary War (b. 1721)
- August 29 – Jacques-Germain Soufflot, French architect (b. 1713)
- September 1 – Reynier de Klerck, Dutch colonial governor (b. 1710)
- September 4 – John Fielding, English magistrate, social reformer (b. 1721)
- September 6 – Françoise Basseporte, French painter (b. 1701)
- September 8
  - Enoch Poor, American Revolutionary general (b. 1736)
  - Jeanne-Marie Leprince de Beaumont, French writer (b. 1711)
- September 15 – Jacob Rodrigues Pereira, academic, first teacher of deaf-mutes in France (b. 1715)
- September 19 – James Cecil, 6th Earl of Salisbury, England (b. 1713)
- September 23 – Marie Anne de Vichy-Chamrond, marquise du Deffand, French salon holder (b. 1697)
- October 2 – John André, British Army officer of the American Revolutionary War (executed) (b. 1750)
- October 17 – William Cookworthy, English chemist (b. 1705)
- November 26 – Sir James Steuart, Scottish economist (b. 1712)
- November 29 – Empress Maria Theresa of Austria (b. 1717)
- December 12 – Jakab Fellner, Hungarian architect (b. 1722)
- December 26 – John Fothergill, English physician (b. 1712)
- date unknown – Thomas Dilworth, British cleric and writer

1781

- January 12 – Richard Challoner, English Catholic prelate (b. 1691)
- January 15 – Mariana Victoria of Spain, Queen consort of Portugal (b. 1718)

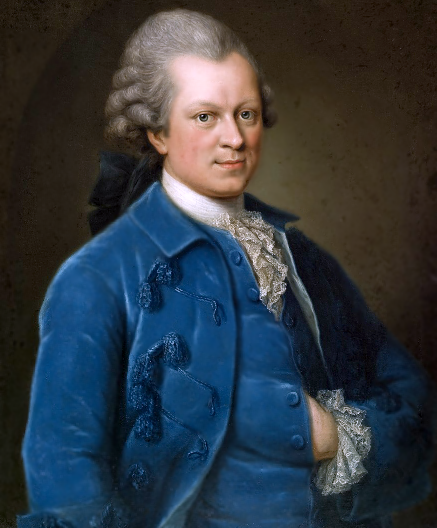
Gotthold Ephraim Lessing

- February 15 – Gotthold Ephraim Lessing, German author, philosopher (b. 1729)
- February 23 – George Taylor, Founding Father of the United States and signer of the Declaration of Independence (b. c. 1716)
- March 17 – Johannes Ewald, Danish national dramatist and poet (b. 1743)
- March 18 – Anne Robert Turgot, French statesman (b. 1727)
- April 23 – James Abercrombie, British general (b. 1706)
- April 28 – Cornelius Harnett, American delegate to the Continental Congress (b. 1723)
- May 3 – Charles Roe, English businessman (b. 1715)
- May 16 – Giacomo Puccini (senior), Italian composer (b. 1712)

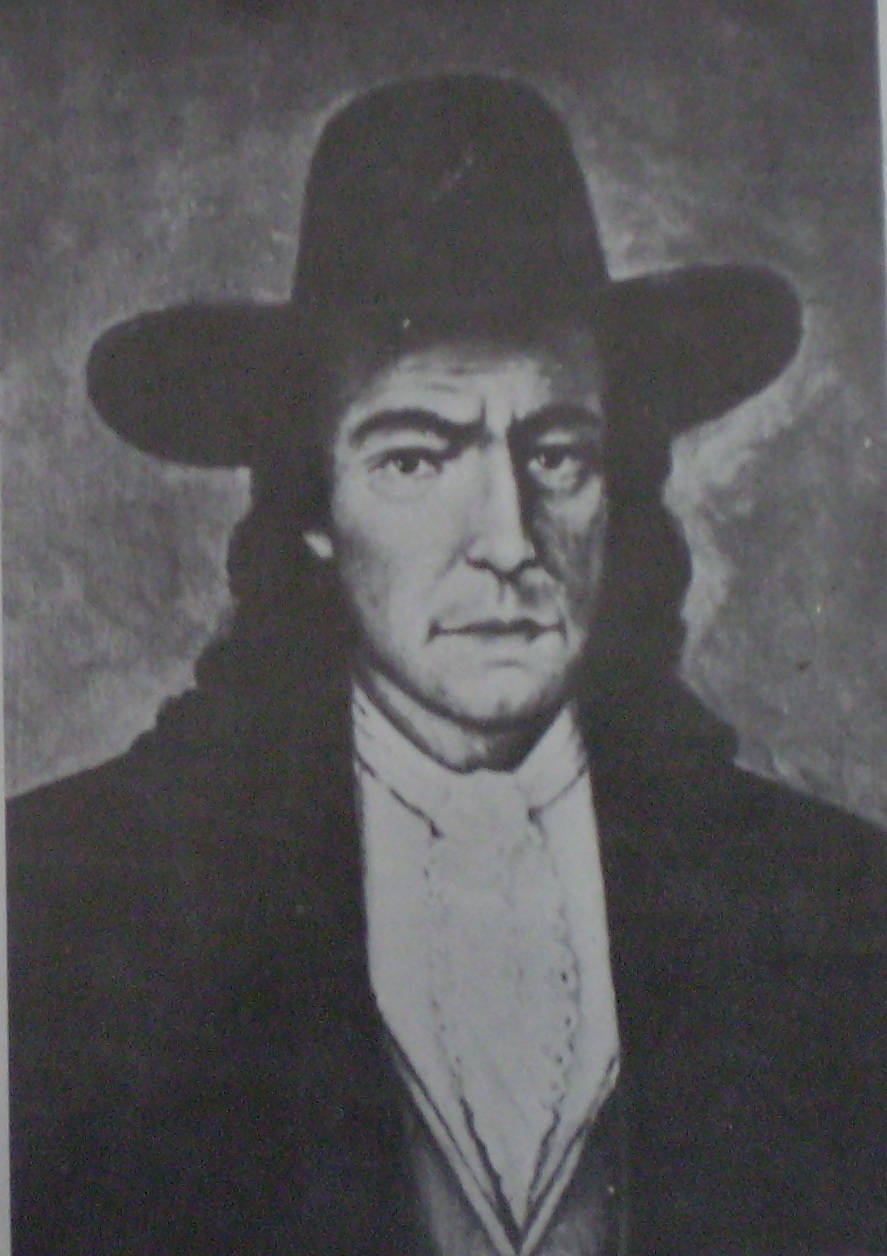
Túpac Amaru II

- May 18 – Túpac Amaru II, Peruvian indigenous rebel leader (b. 1742)
- May 18 – Micaela Bastidas Puyucahua, Peruvian indigenous rebel leader (b. 1745)
- May 27 – Giovanni Battista Beccaria, Italian physicist (b. 1716)
- May 30 – John Conder, Independent English minister at Cambridge (b. 1714)
- July 18 – Padre Francisco Garcés, Spanish missionary (killed) (b. 1738)
- July 23 – John Joachim Zubly, Swiss-born Continental Congressman (b. 1724)
- August 16 – Charles-François de Broglie, marquis de Ruffec, French soldier and diplomat (b. 1719)
- September 7 – Lord Richard Cavendish (1752–1781), second son of William Cavendish (b. 1752)
- September 11 – Johann August Ernesti, German theologian and philologist (b. 1707)
- September 12 – Peter Scheemakers, Flemish sculptor (b. 1691)
- September 28 – William Nassau de Zuylestein, 4th Earl of Rochford, British diplomat, statesman (b. 1717)
- October 16 – Edward Hawke, 1st Baron Hawke, British naval officer (b. 1705)
- November 4
  - Johann Nikolaus Götz, German poet (b. 1721)
  - Charles Morris, Canadian judge (b. 1711)
- November 21 – Jean-Frédéric Phélypeaux, Count of Maurepas, French statesman (b. 1701)
- December 2 – Zenón de Somodevilla, 1st Marqués de la Ensenada, Spanish noble (b. 1702)
- December 30 – John Needham, British biologist and priest (b. 1713)
- December – Juan Montón y Mallén, composer (b. c. 1730)
- Samuel Conrad Schwach, Norwegian newspaper publisher (b. c. 1731)

1782

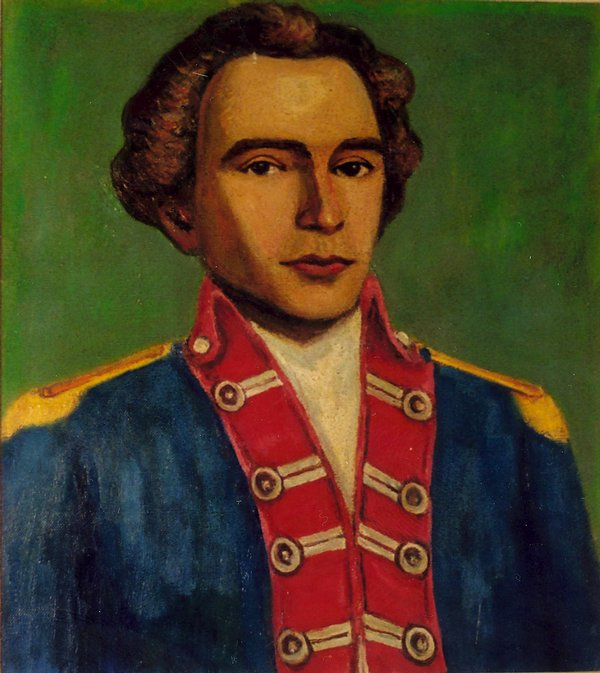
William Crawford

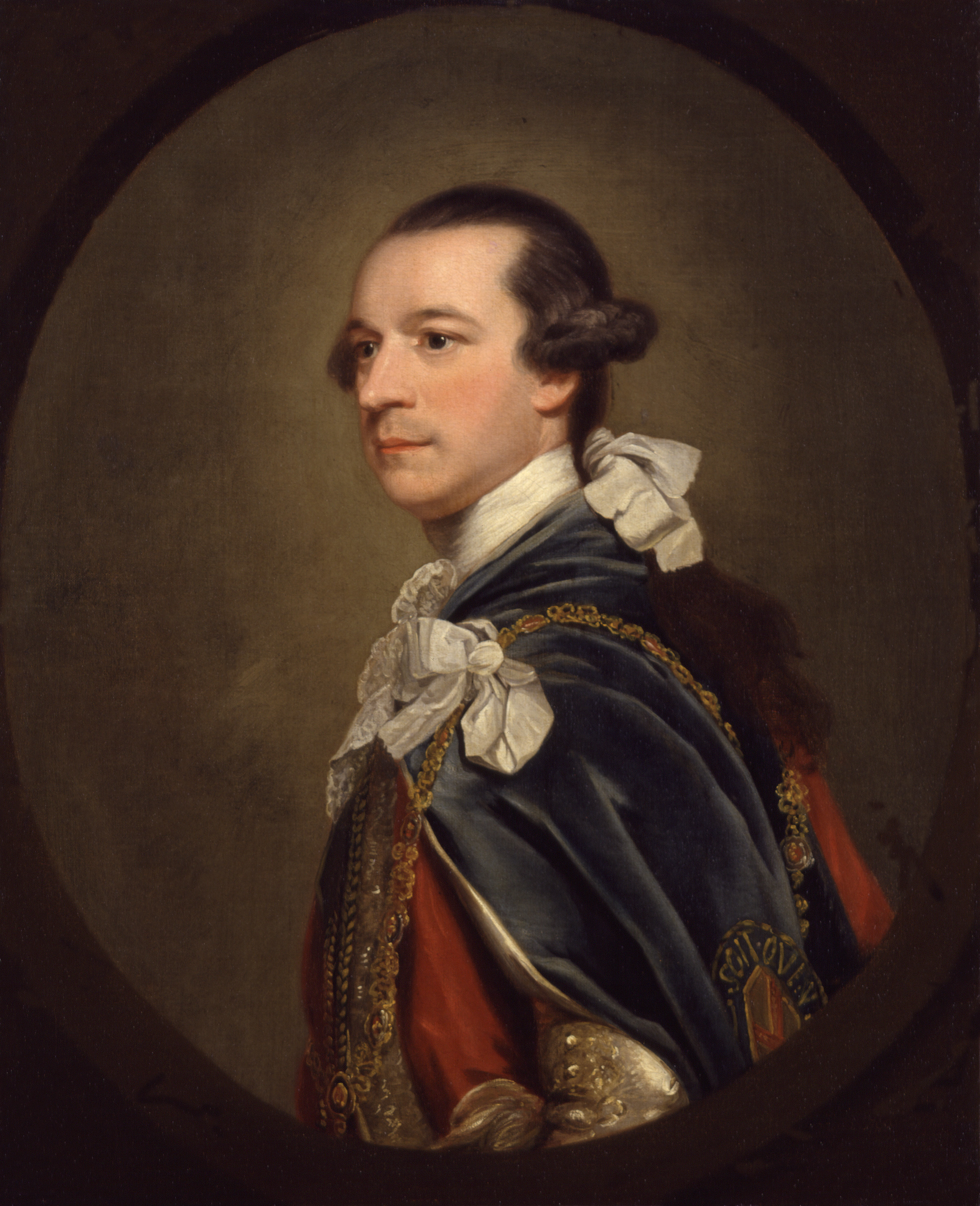
Charles Watson-Wentworth, 2nd Marquess of Rockingham

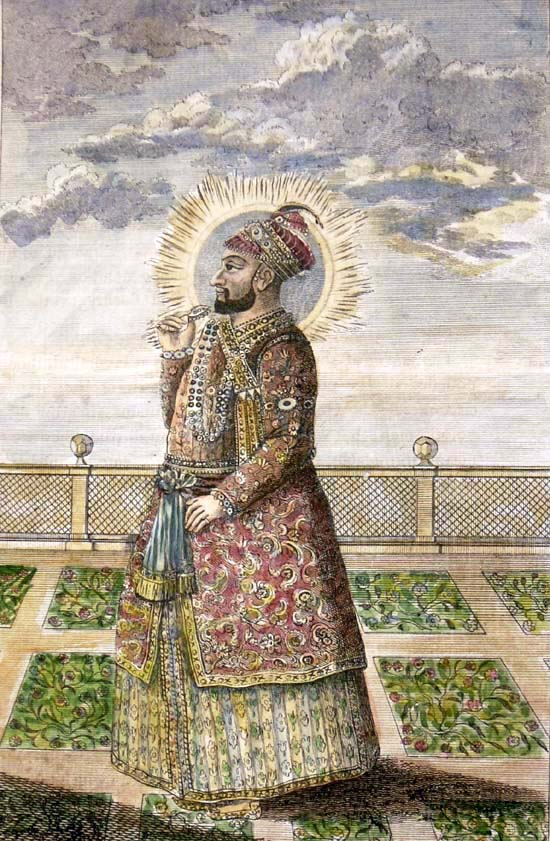
Hyder Ali

- January 2 – Johann Christian Bach, German composer (b. 1735)
- January 4 – Ange-Jacques Gabriel, French architect (b. 1698)
- January 18 – John Pringle, Scottish physician (b. 1707)
- January 28 — Jean-Baptiste Bourguignon d'Anville, French geographer and cartographer (b. 1697)
- January 30 – Vasily Dolgorukov-Krymsky, Russian general (b. 1722)
- February 9 – Giuseppe Luigi Assemani, Syrian orientalist (b. 1710)
- February 10 – Friedrich Christoph Oetinger, German theologian (b. 1702)
- March 1 – John A. Treutlen, Governor of Georgia (b. 1734)
- March 2 – Sophie of France, French princess (b.1734)
- March 9 – Sava II Petrović-Njegoš, Metropolitan of Cetinje (b. 1702)
- March 17 – Daniel Bernoulli, Dutch-born mathematical physicist (b. 1700)
- April 7 – Taksin the Great, King of Siam (Thonburi Kingdom) (b. 1734)
- April 13 – Metastasio, Italian poet, librettist (b. 1698)
- April 17 – Baal Shem of London, British Kabbalist (b. 1708)
- April 22 – Josef Seger, Czech composer and organist (b. 1716)
- April 28 – William Talbot, 1st Earl Talbot, English politician (b. 1710)
- May 8 – Sebastião José de Carvalho e Melo, 1st Marquis of Pombal, Portuguese statesman (b. 1699)
- May 15 – Richard Wilson, British painter (b. 1714)
- May 16 – Daniel Solander, Swedish botanist (b. 1736)
- May 20 – William Emerson, English mathematician (b. 1701)
- May 20 – Axel Lagerbielke, Swedish admiral and statesman (b. 1703)
- May 22 – Princess Friederike of Hesse-Darmstadt (b. 1752)
- June 11 – William Crawford, American soldier and surveyor (burned at the stake by Native Americans) (b. 1732)
- June 18 – John Wood, the Younger, English architect (b. 1728)
- June 21 – Prince George William of Hesse-Darmstadt, German prince (b. 1722)
- July 1 – Charles Watson-Wentworth, 2nd Marquess of Rockingham, British statesman, 2-time Prime Minister of Great Britain (b. 1730)
- July 15 – Farinelli, Italian castrato (b. 1705)
- August 27 – John Laurens, American soldier (b. 1754)
- August 31 – George Croghan, American colonist (b. c. 1718)
- September 5 – Bartolina Sisa, Bolivian indigenous Aymara heroine, rebel leader (b. c. 1750)
- September 6
  - Gregoria Apaza, Bolivian indigenous leader (b. 1751)
  - Martha Wayles Skelton Jefferson, wife of Thomas Jefferson (b. 1748)
- September 14 – Nicholas Cooke, first Governor of Rhode Island (b. 1717)
- October 2 – Charles Lee, Continental Army general during the American War of Independence (b. 1732)
- November 5 – James Burrow, British scholar (b. 1701)
- November 21 – Jacques de Vaucanson, French inventor (b. 1709)
- December 7 – Hyder Ali, Indian general, Sultan of Mysore (b. 1720)
- December 11–William Beadle, Anglo-American merchant (b. 1730)
- December 16 – William Cole (antiquary), British antiquarian (b. 1714)
- December 27 – Henry Home, Lord Kames, Scottish advocate and philosopher (b. 1697)
- date unknown
  - Christine Kirch, German astronomer (b. 1696)
  - Sabina Aufenwerth, German potter (b. 1706)
  - Elisabeth Christina von Linné, Swedish botanist (b. 1743)

1783

- January 2 – Johann Jakob Bodmer, Swiss author (b. 1698)
- January 7 – William Tans'ur, English hymnist (b. 1706)
- January 15 – William Alexander, Lord Stirling, American major-general in the Continental Army during the American Revolutionary War (b. 1726)
- January 18 – Jeanne Quinault, French actress, playwright (b. 1699)

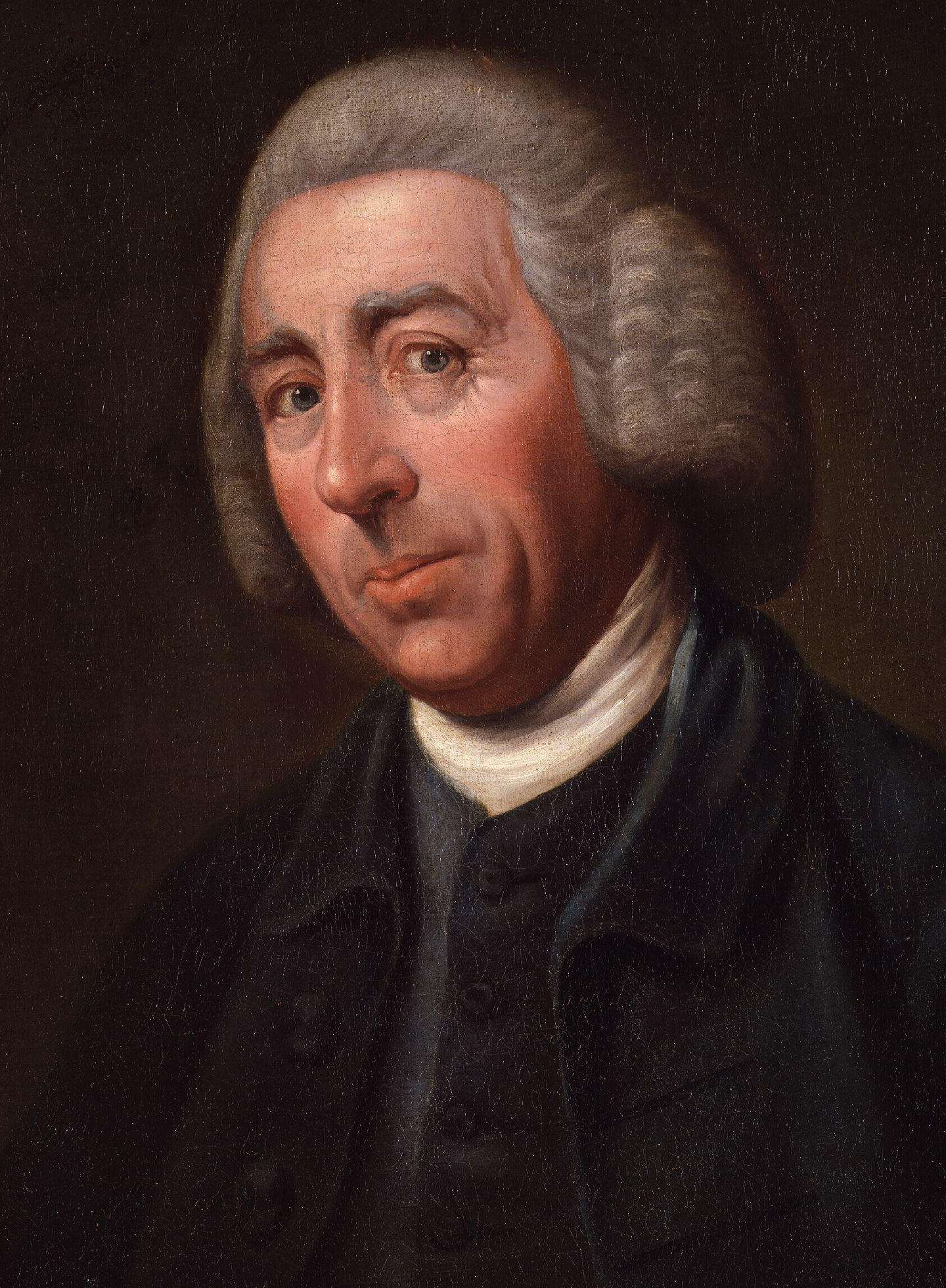
Capability Brown

- February 6 – Capability Brown, English landscape gardener (b. 1716)
- February 10 – James Nares, English composer of mostly sacred vocal works (b. 1715)
- March 2 – Francisco Salzillo, Spanish sculptor (b. 1707)
- March 19 – Frederick Cornwallis, Archbishop of Canterbury (b. 1713)
- March 23 – Charles Carroll, American lawyer, delegate to the Continental Congress (b. 1723)
- March 26 – Anna Rosina de Gasc, German portrait painter (b. 1713)
- March 30 – William Hunter, Scottish anatomist (b. 1718)
- March 31 – Nikita Ivanovich Panin, Russian statesman (b. 1718)
- April 7 – Ignaz Holzbauer, German composer (b. 1711)
- April 16
  - Benedict Joseph Labre, French Catholic saint (b. 1745)
  - Christian Mayer, Czech astronomer (b. 1719)
- May 11 – Juliane Reichardt, German-born Bohemian pianist, singer and composer (b. 1752)
- May 23 – James Otis, American lawyer, patriot (b. 1725)
- June 2 – Charles Spalding, Scottish inventor and underwater diver, killed in diving bell accident (b. 1738)
- September 14 – James Grenville, British Member of Parliament (b. 1715)

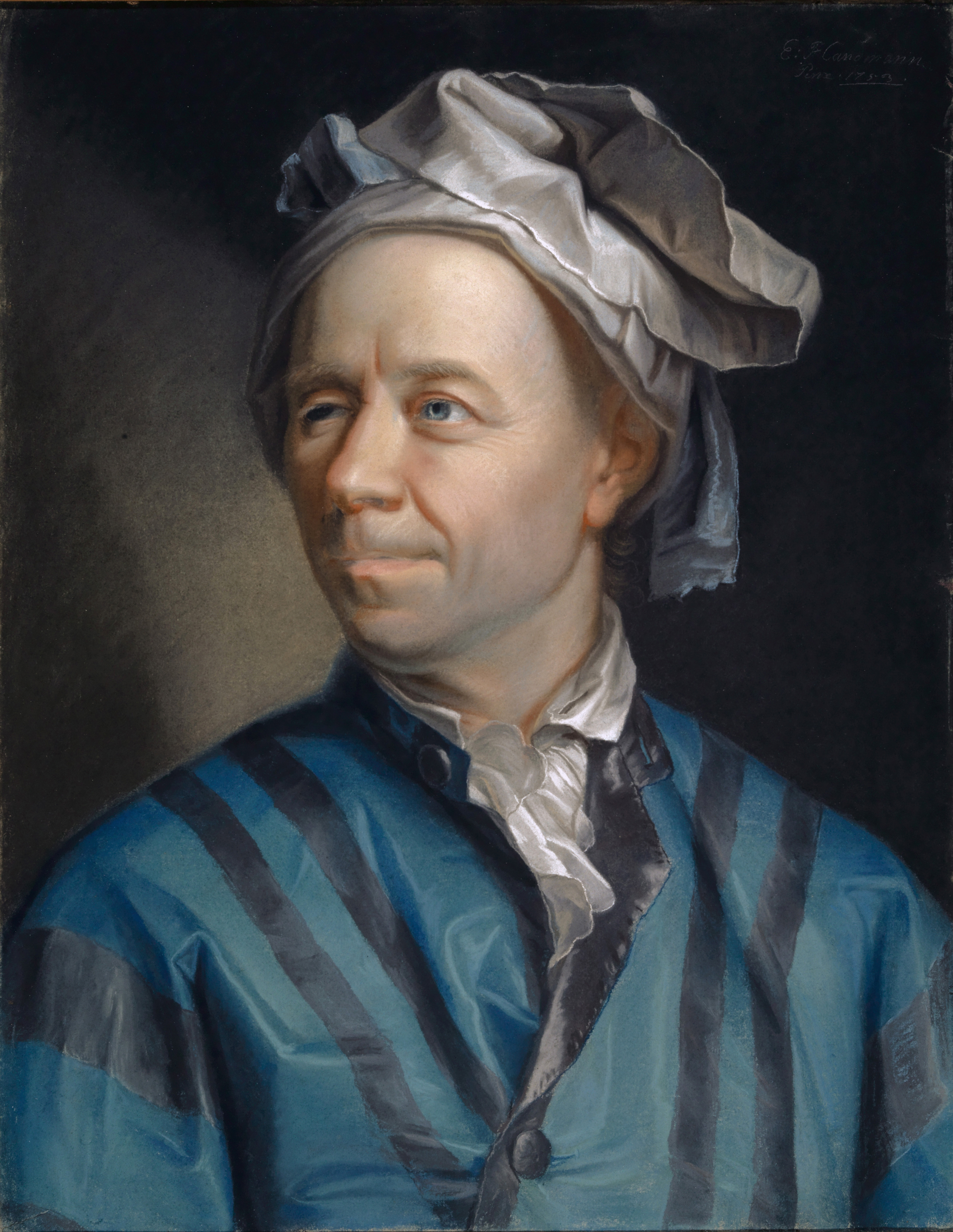
Leonhard Euler

- September 18
  - Leonhard Euler, Swiss mathematician, physicist (b. 1707)
  - Benjamin Kennicott, English churchman, Hebrew scholar (b. 1718)
- September 28 – Marguerite Gourdan, French procurer (b. c. 1730)
- October 2 – Joseph Leeson, 1st Earl of Milltown, Irish politician (b. 1701)
- October 29 – Jean le Rond d'Alembert, French mathematician (b. 1717)
- November 1 – Carl Linnaeus the Younger, Swedish naturalist (b. 1741)
- November 3 – Charles Collé, French dramatist (b. 1709)
- November 15 – John Hanson, American President of the Continental Congress (b. 1721)
- November 23 – Yoriyuki Arima, Japanese mathematician (b. 1714)
- December 13 – Pehr Wilhelm Wargentin, Swedish astronomer (b. 1717)
- December 15 – Ahmad bin Said al-Busaidi, first ruler of Oman of the Al Said dynasty (b. 1710)
- December 16
  - Johann Adolph Hasse, German composer (b. 1699)
  - Sir William James, 1st Baronet, British naval commander (b. 1720)
- Date unknown:
  - Thomas Calcraft, English politician and Lieutenant-Colonel (b. 1738)
  - Adolf Friedrich von Reinhard, jurist and publicist (b. 1726)

1784

- February 4 – Princess Friederike Luise of Prussia, Prussian princess (b. 1714)
- February 27 – Count of St. Germain, French philosopher, adventurer (b. 1710)
- March 26 – Thomas Bond, American physician and surgeon (b. 1712)
- March 27 – Ralph Bigland, British officer of arms (b. 1712)
- March 31 – Thomas Adam, English clergyman, religious writer (b. 1701)
- April 26 – Nano Nagle, Irish convent founder (b. 1718)
- April 29 – Agustín de Jáuregui, Spanish colonial governor (b. 1711)
- May 3 – Anthony Benezet, French-born American abolitionist and educator (b. 1713)
- May 10 – Antoine Court de Gébelin, French pastor (b. 1725)
- May 12 – Abraham Trembley, Swiss naturalist (b. 1710)
- June 8 – Lukrecija Bogašinović Budmani, Croatian poet (b. 1710)
- June 11 – Lê Quý Đôn, Vietnamese philosopher, poet, encyclopedist, and government official (b. 1726)
- June 13 – Henry Middleton, American president of the Continental Congress (b. 1717)
- June 14 – Andrzej Mokronowski, Polish general (b. 1713)
- June 26 – Caesar Rodney, American lawyer, signer of the United States Declaration of Independence (b. 1728)
- July 1 – Wilhelm Friedemann Bach, German composer (b. 1710)

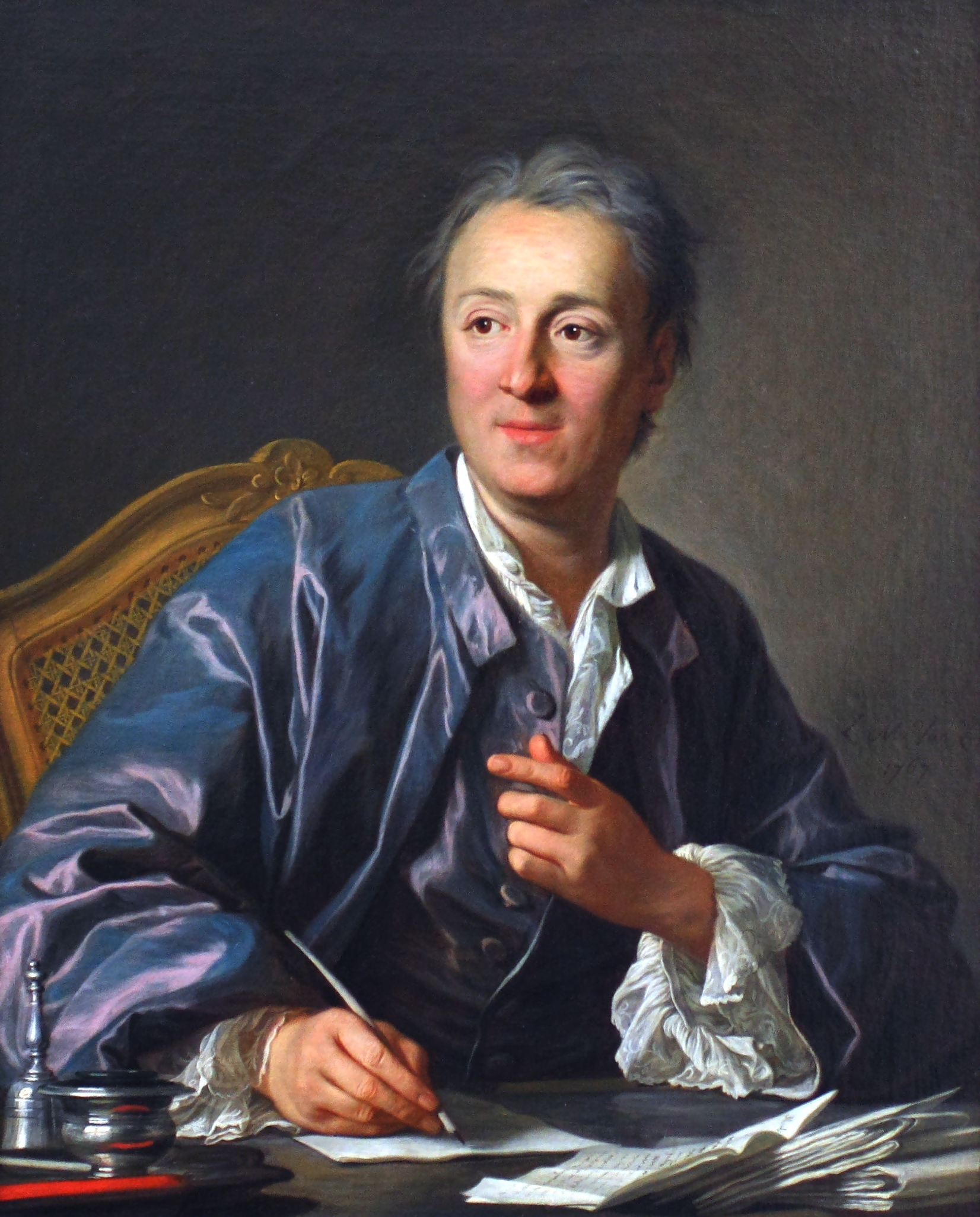
Denis Diderot

- July 31 – Denis Diderot, French philosopher, encyclopedist (b. 1713)
- August 4 – Giovanni Battista Martini, Italian musician (b. 1706)
- August 10 – Allan Ramsay, Scottish portrait-painter (b. 1713)
- August 14 – Nathaniel Hone, Irish-born painter (b. 1718)
- August 28 – Junípero Serra, Spanish Franciscan missionary (b. 1713)
- September 1 – Jean-François Séguier, French astronomer and botanist (b. 1703)
- September 4 – César-François Cassini de Thury, French astronomer (b. 1714)
- September 8 – Ann Lee, American religious leader (b. 1736)
- September 15 – Nicolas Bernard Lépicié, French painter (b. 1735)
- November 1 – Jean-Jacques Lefranc, Marquis de Pompignan, French polymath, author and poet (b. 1709)
- November 9 – George Baylor, officer in the American Continental Army (b. 1752)
- December 5 – Phillis Wheatley, first published African-American author (b. 1753)

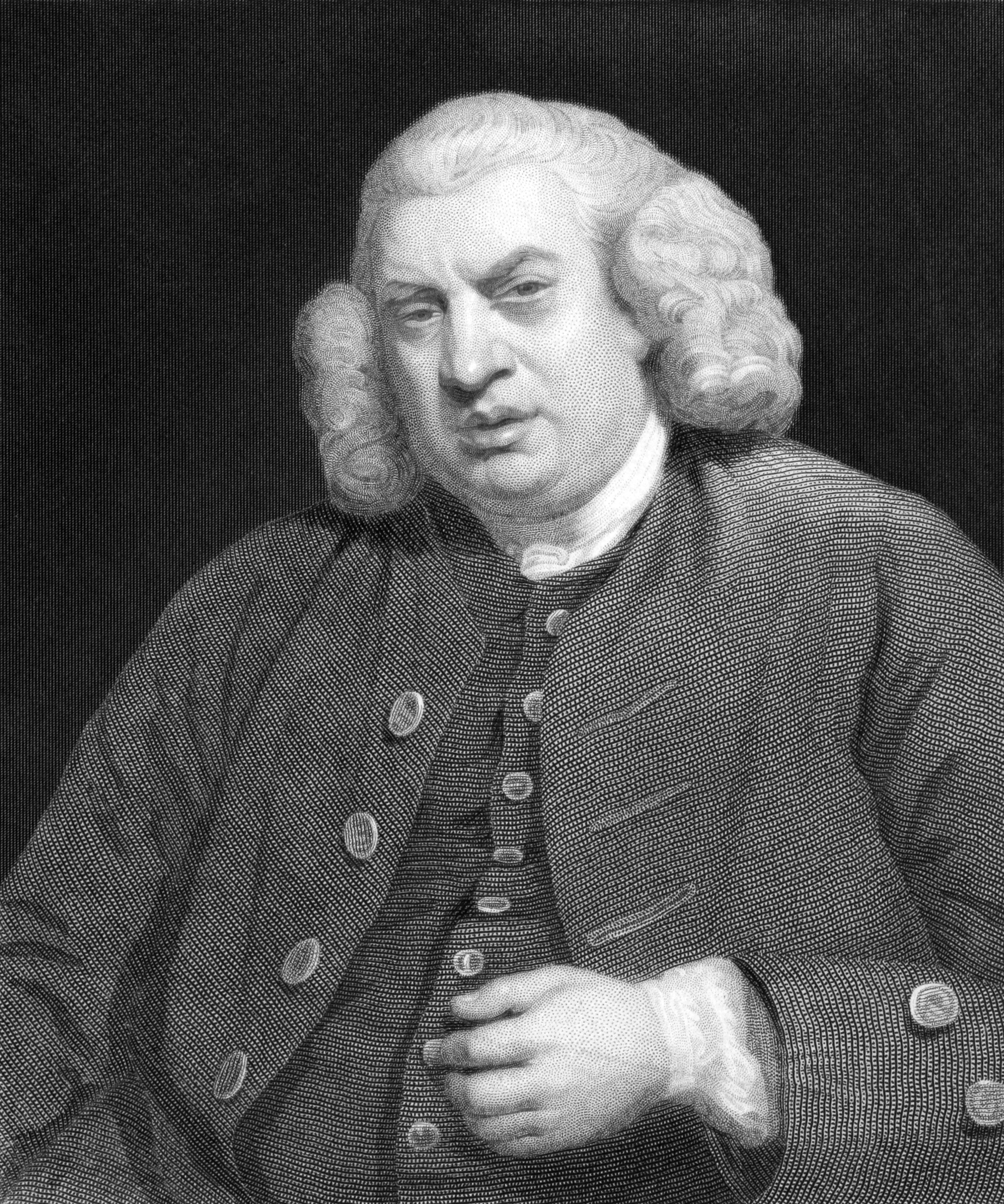
Samuel Johnson

- December 13 – Samuel Johnson, English writer, lexicographer (b. 1709)
- December 25 – Yosa Buson, Japanese poet, painter (b. 1716)
- December 26 – Seth Warner, American revolutionary leader (b. 1743)
- date unknown – Raja Haji Fisabilillah, Buginese monarch of the Johor Sultanate, warrior, emperor, and government official
- date unknown – Abd al-Karim Kashmiri, Indo-Persian historian

1785

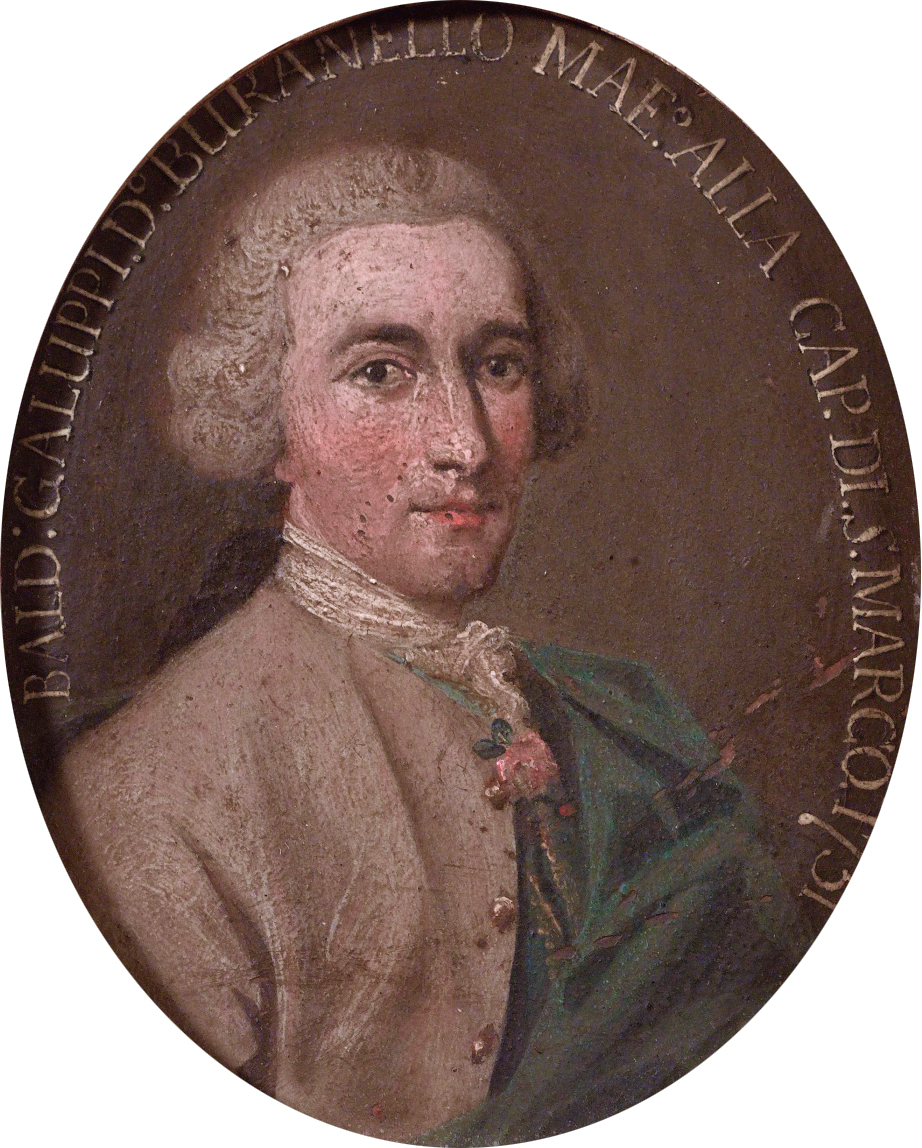
Baldassare Galuppi

- January 3 – Baldassare Galuppi, Italian composer (b. 1706)
- January 6 – Haym Salomon, Polish-Jewish American financier of the American Revolution (b. 1740)
- January 19 – Jonathan Toup, English classical scholar, critic (b. 1713)
- January 23 – Matthew Stewart, Scottish mathematician (b. 1717)
- February 24 – Sir Thomas Dyke Acland, 7th Baronet (b. 1722)
- February 26 – Barbara Erni, Liechtenstein confidence trickster (b. 1743)
- March 14 – Giovanni Battista Locatelli, Italian opera director (b. 1713)
- April 14 – William Whitehead, English writer (b. 1715)
- April 26 – Johan Samuel Augustin, German-Danish astronomical writer, civil servant (b. 1715)
- May 8
  - Étienne François, duc de Choiseul, French statesman (b. 1719)
  - Pietro Longhi, Venetian painter (b. 1701)
- June 2
  - Jean Paul de Gua de Malves, French mathematician (b. 1713)
  - Gottfried August Homilius, German composer, cantor and organist (b. 1714)
- June 30 – James Oglethorpe, English general, founder of the state of Georgia (b. 1696)
- July 5 – Anne Poulett, British politician (b. 1711)
- July 6 – Frederick August I, Duke of Oldenburg (b. 1711)
- July 9 – William Strahan, British politician (b. 1715)
- July 12 – Louis-René de Caradeuc de La Chalotais, French jurist on the so-called "Brittany affair" (b. 1701)
- July 13 – Stephen Hopkins, Founding Father of the United States (b. 1707)
- July 17 – Margaret Bentinck, Duchess of Portland, British duchess (b. 1715)
- August 17 – Jonathan Trumbull, Governor of the Colony and the state of Connecticut (b. 1710)
- August 26 – George Germain, 1st Viscount Sackville, British soldier, politician (b. 1716)
- August 28 – Jean-Baptiste Pigalle, French sculptor (b. 1714)
- August 31 – Pietro Chiari, Italian playwright (b. 1712)
- September 19 – Maria Antonia Ferdinanda of Spain, Queen consort of Sardinia (b. 1729)
- September 30 – Johann Jakob Moser, German jurist (b. 1701)
- October 4
  - David Brearley, delegate to the U.S. Constitutional Convention (b. 1703)
  - Alexander Runciman, Scottish painter (b. 1736)
- November 13 – Joaquín Ibarra, Spanish printer (b. 1725)
- November 15 – César Gabriel de Choiseul, French officer (b. 1712)
- November 18 – Louis Philippe I, Duke of Orléans, French soldier, writer (b. 1725)
- November 19 – Bernard de Bury, French composer (b. 1720)
- November 20 – James Wright, Governor of Georgia (b. 1716)
- November 25 – Richard Glover, English poet (b. 1712)

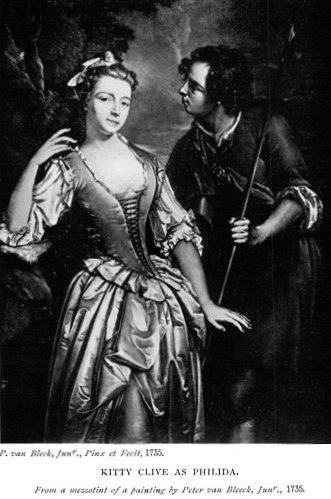
Kitty Clive

- December 6 – Kitty Clive, English actress, playwright (b. 1711)
- December 29 – Johan Herman Wessel, Norwegian author (b. 1742)
- date unknown
  - Faustina Pignatelli, Italian mathematician (b. 1705)

1786

- January 4 – Moses Mendelssohn, Jewish philosopher (b. 1729)
- January 7 – Jean-Étienne Guettard, French physician, scientist (b. 1715)
- January 14 – Meshech Weare, Governor of New Hampshire (b. 1713)
- January 26 – Hans Joachim von Zieten, Prussian field marshal (b. 1699)
- February 25 – Thomas Wright, British astronomer (b. 1711)
- February 28 – John Gwynn, English architect and engineer (b. 1713)
- March 11 – Charles Humphreys, American delegate to the Continental Congress (b. 1714)
- April 10 – John Byron, British naval officer (b. 1723)
- April 20 – John Goodricke, English astronomer (b. 1764)
- May 1 – Benjamin Waller, American politician (b. 1716)
- May 2 – Petronella Johanna de Timmerman, Dutch poet, scientist (b. 1723)
- May 15 – Eva Ekeblad, Swedish scientist and agronomist, first female member of the Royal Swedish Academy of Sciences (b. 1724)
- May 19 – John Stanley, English composer (b. 1712)

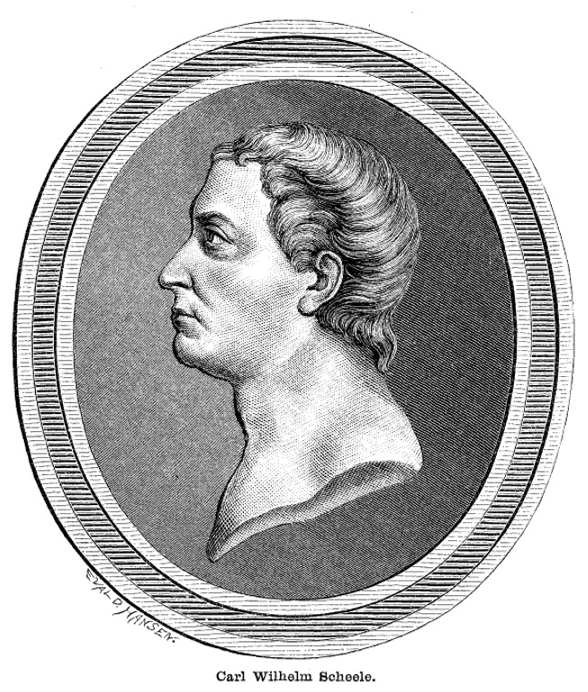
Carl Wilhelm Scheele

- May 21 – Carl Wilhelm Scheele, Swedish chemist (b. 1742)
- May 22 – Carl Fredrik Mennander, Swedish bishop (b. 1712)
- May 25 – Peter III of Portugal, consort of Queen Maria I of Portugal (b. 1717)
- June 17 – Adam Drummond, British politician (b. 1713)
- June 19 – Nathanael Greene, major general in the Continental Army, 3rd Quartermaster General (b. 1742)
- July 28 – Carlo Marchionni, Italian architect (b. 1702)

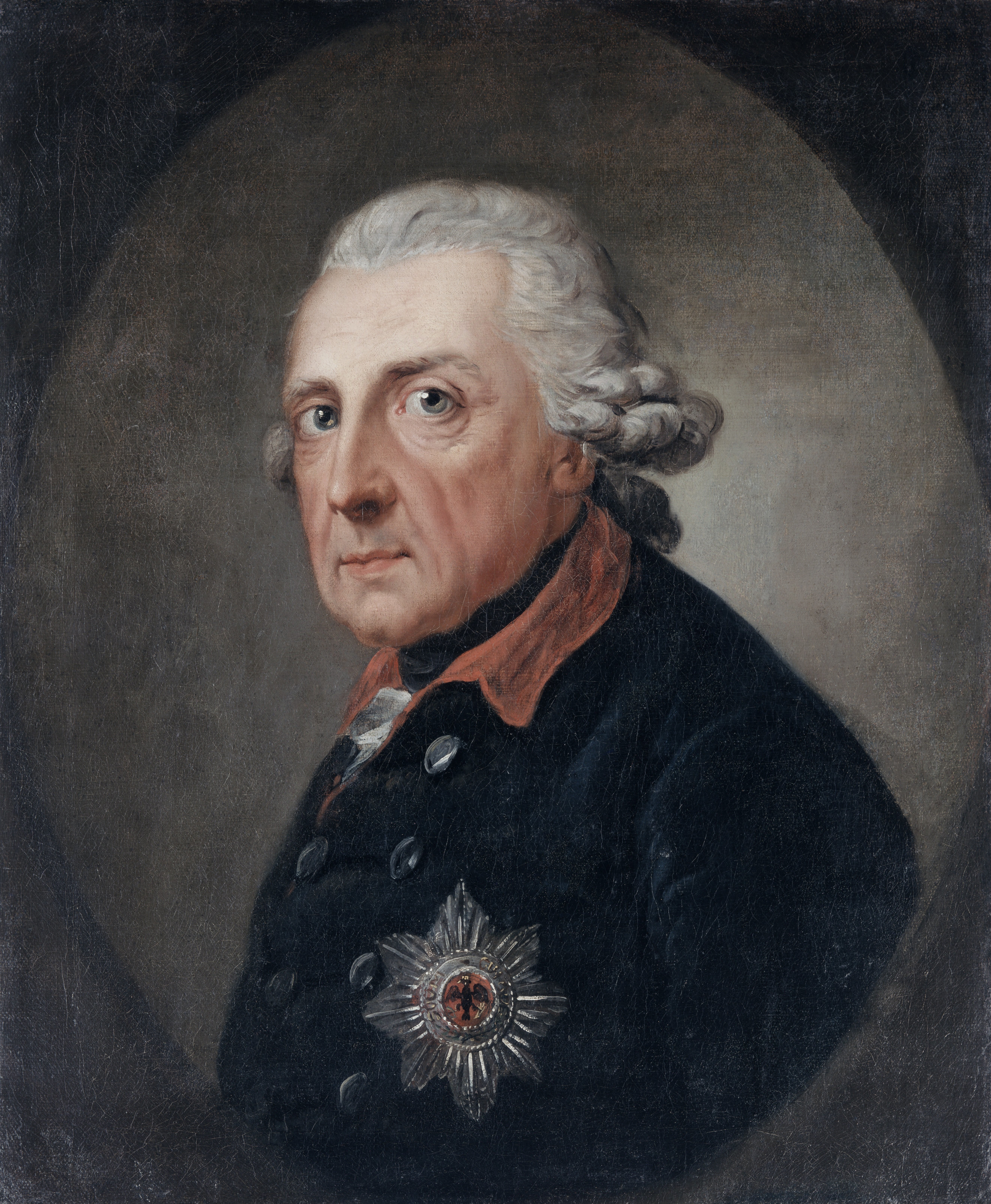
Frederick II of Prussia

- August 17 – King Frederick II of Prussia ("Frederick the Great") (b. 1712)
- August 27 – Carl Fredrik Scheffer, Swedish politician (b. 1715)
- September 5 – Jonas Hanway, English merchant, traveler, and philanthropist (b. 1712)
- September 17 – Tokugawa Ieharu, Japanese shōgun (b. 1737)
- September 18 – Giovanni Battista Guadagnini, Italian luthier (b. 1711)
- October 2 – Augustus Keppel, 1st Viscount Keppel, British admiral (b. 1725)
- October 5 – Johann Gottlieb Gleditsch, German botanist (b. 1714)
- October 17 – Johann Ludwig Aberli, Swiss artist (b. 1723)
- October 20 – Humphrey Sturt, British architect (b. 1725)
- October 31 – Princess Amelia of Great Britain, Second daughter of George II of Great Britain (b. 1711)
- November 30 – Bernardo de Gálvez, Spanish military leader who aided the United States in its quest for independence, in the American Revolutionary War (b. 1746)
- December 26 – Gasparo Gozzi, Italian critic, dramatist (b. 1713)

1787

- January 1 – Arthur Middleton, American politician (b. 1742)
- January 4 – Prince Joseph of Saxe-Hildburghausen, German prince (b. 1702)
- February 2 – Ignác Raab, Czech artist (b. 1715)
- February 5 – Hugh Farmer, British theologian (b. 1714)
- February 4 – Pompeo Batoni, Italian painter (b. 1708)

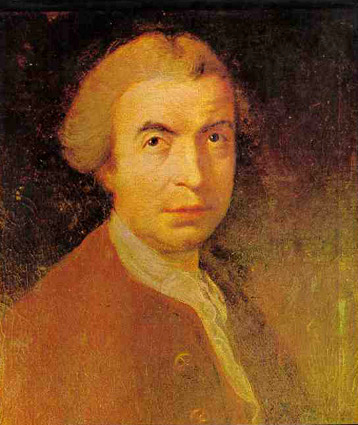
Roger Joseph Boscovich

- February 13
  - Rudjer Boscovich, Croatian scientist, diplomat (b. 1711)
  - Charles Gravier, comte de Vergennes, French statesman, diplomat (b. 1717)
- February 21 – Antonio Rodríguez de Hita, Spanish composer (b. 1722)
- February 28 – Princess Ulrike Friederike Wilhelmine of Hesse-Kassel, German princess (b. 1722)
- March 8 – Samuel Graves, British Royal Navy admiral (b. 1713)
- March 22 – Charles de Fitz-James, Marshal of France (b. 1712)
- April 2 – Thomas Gage, British general (b. 1719)
- May 10 – William Watson, English physician, scientist (b. 1715)
- May 26 – Lord John Murray, British politician (b. 1711)
- May 28 – Leopold Mozart, Austrian composer (b. 1719)
- May 31 – Felix of Nicosia, Cypriot Catholic saint (b. 1715)
- June 10 – La Caramba (Maria Antonia Fernandez), Spanish flamenco singer and dancer (b. 1751)
- June 14 – Johann Georg Dominicus von Linprun, German scientist (b. 1714)
- June 17 – José de Gálvez, Spanish politician (b. 1720)
- June 20 – Carl Friedrich Abel, German composer (b. 1723)
- July 4 – Charles, Prince of Soubise, Marshal of France (b. 1715)
- July 25 – Arthur Devis, British artist (b. 1712)
- August 1 – Alphonsus Liguori, Italian founder of the Redemptorist Order (b. 1696)
- August 7 – Francis Blackburne, English Anglican churchman, activist (b. 1705)
- August 13 – Marc Antoine René de Voyer, French noble (b. 1722)
- August 16 – John Ponsonby (politician), Irish politician (b. 1713)
- September 7 – Carlos Fitz-James Stuart, 4th Duke of Liria and Jérica, Spanish duke (b. 1752)
- October 7 – Henry Muhlenberg, German-born founder of the U.S. Lutheran Church (b. 1711)
- October 28 – Johann Karl August Musäus, German author and collector of folk tales (b. 1735)
- November 3 – Robert Lowth, English bishop and grammarian (b. 1710)
- November 4 – Johan Daniel Berlin, Norwegian composer and organist (b. 1714)

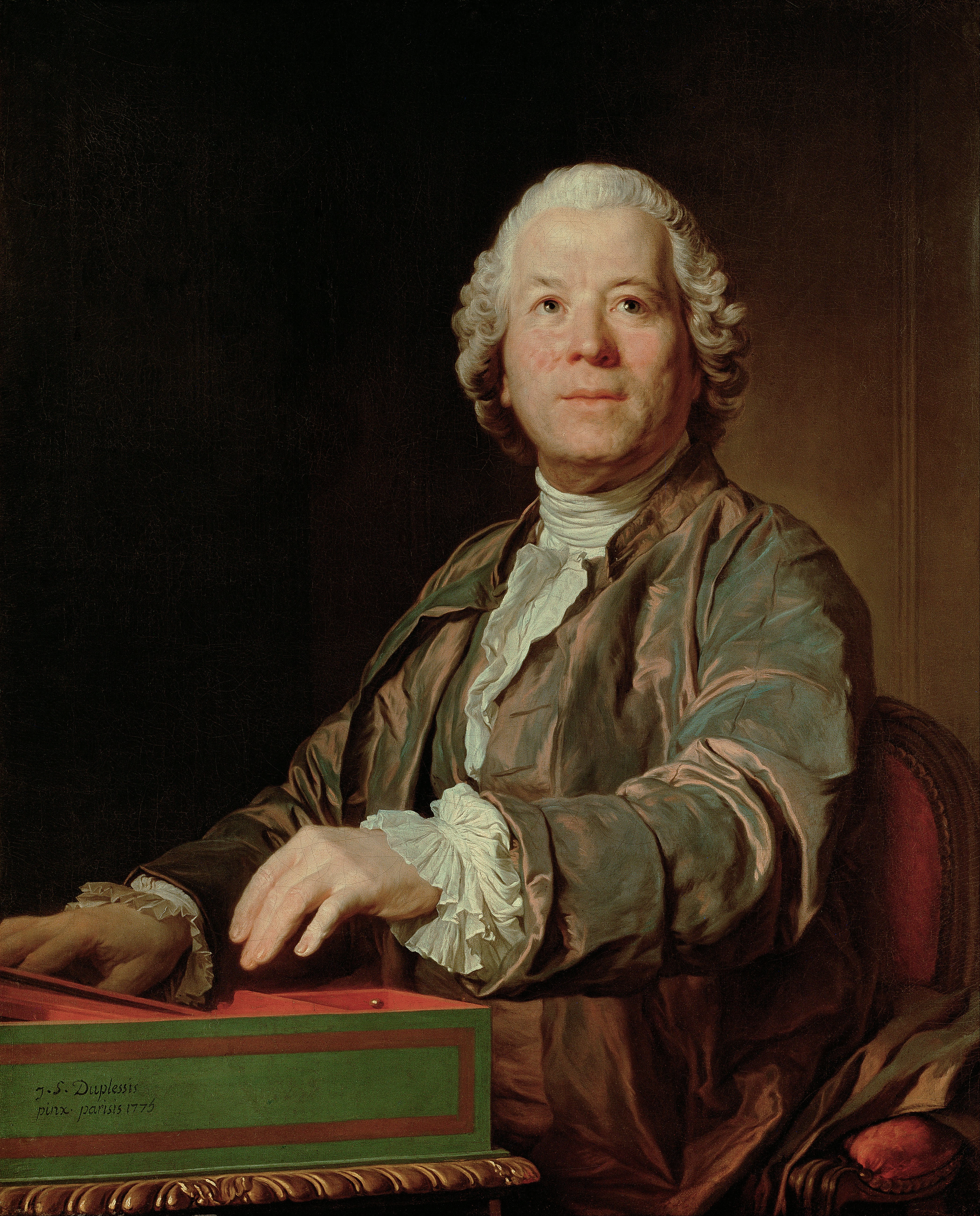
Christoph Willibald Gluck

- November 15 – Christoph Willibald Gluck, German composer (b. 1714)
- December 11 – Robert de Lamanon, French botanist (b. 1752)
- date unknown
  - Maria Pellegrina Amoretti, Italian lawyer (b. 1756)
  - The Two-Headed Boy of Bengal, sufferer from the rare condition Craniopagus parasiticus (b. 1783)
  - Francis William Drake, British admiral and Governor of Newfoundland (b. 1724)

1788

- January 14 – François Joseph Paul, marquis de Grasetilly, comte de Grasse, French admiral (b. 1722)
- January 31 – Charles Edward Stuart, claimant to the British throne (b. 1720)
- February 17 – Maurice Quentin de La Tour, French portrait painter (b. 1704)
- February 18 – John Whitehurst, English clockmaker, scientist (b. 1713)
- February 21 – Johann Georg Palitzsch, German astronomer (b. 1723)
- February 28 – Thomas Cushing, American Continental Congressman (b. 1725)
- March 2 – Salomon Gessner, Swiss painter and newspaper publisher (b. 1730)
- March 29 – Charles Wesley, English co-founder (with his brother, John Wesley) of the religious movement known as Methodism (b. 1707)
- March 31 – Catharina Elisabet Grubb, Finnish industrialist (b. 1721)
- April 12 – Carlo Antonio Campioni, French-born composer (b. 1719)
- April 15 – Giuseppe Bonno, Austrian composer (b. 1711)
- April 16 – Georges-Louis Leclerc, Comte de Buffon, French naturalist (b. 1707)
- May 8 – Giovanni Antonio Scopoli, Italian-born physician, naturalist (b. 1723)
- May 11 – Dorothea Biehl, Danish writer (b. 1731)
- June 14 – Adam Gib, Scottish religious leader (b. 1714)
- June 21 – Johann Georg Hamann, German philosopher (b. 1730)
- July 3 – François Jacquier, French Franciscan mathematician, physicist (b. 1711)
- July 30 – Kajetan Sołtyk, Polish Catholic priest (b. 1715)

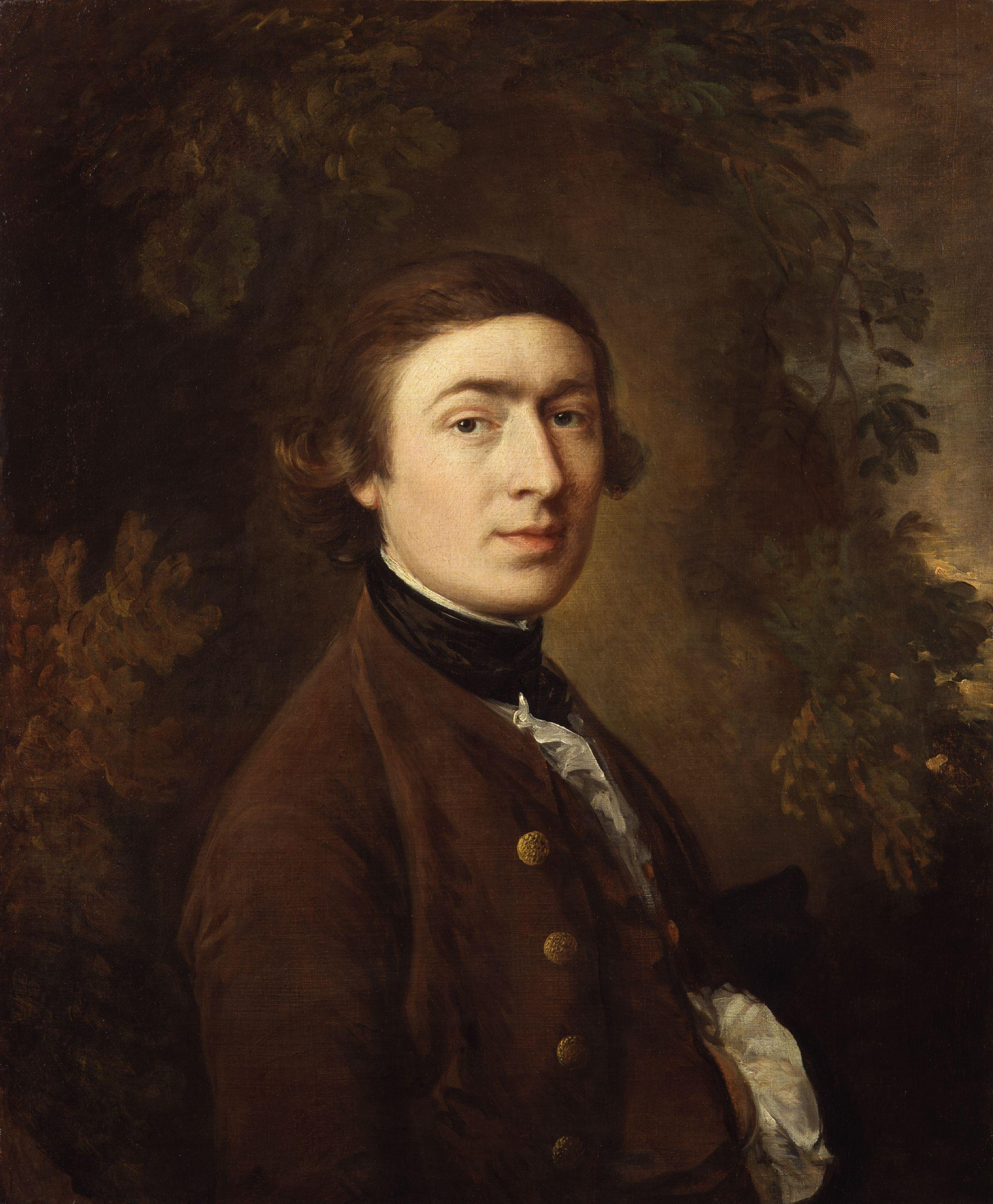
Thomas Gainsborough

- August 2 – Thomas Gainsborough, British painter (b. 1727)
- August 8 – Armand de Vignerot du Plessis, French soldier, diplomat and statesman (b. 1696)
- August 25 – Tanuma Okitsugu, Japanese government official (b. 1719)
- August 28 – Elizabeth Pierrepont, Duchess of Kingston-upon-Hull, English noble (b. 1721)
- September 25 – Thomas Missing, English politician (b. 1710)
- October 13 – Robert Nugent, 1st Earl Nugent, Irish politician, poet (b. 1709)
- October 15 – Samuel Greig, Scottish-Russian Admiral (b. 1736)
- November 14 – Thomas Estcourt Cresswell, British politician (b. 1712)
- November 20 – Samuel Martin (Secretary to the Treasury), British politician (b. 1714)
- November 23 – Infante Gabriel of Spain (b. 1752)
- December 6 – Jonathan Shipley, English bishop, politician (b. 1714)
  - Nicole-Reine Lepaute, French astronomer (b. 1723)

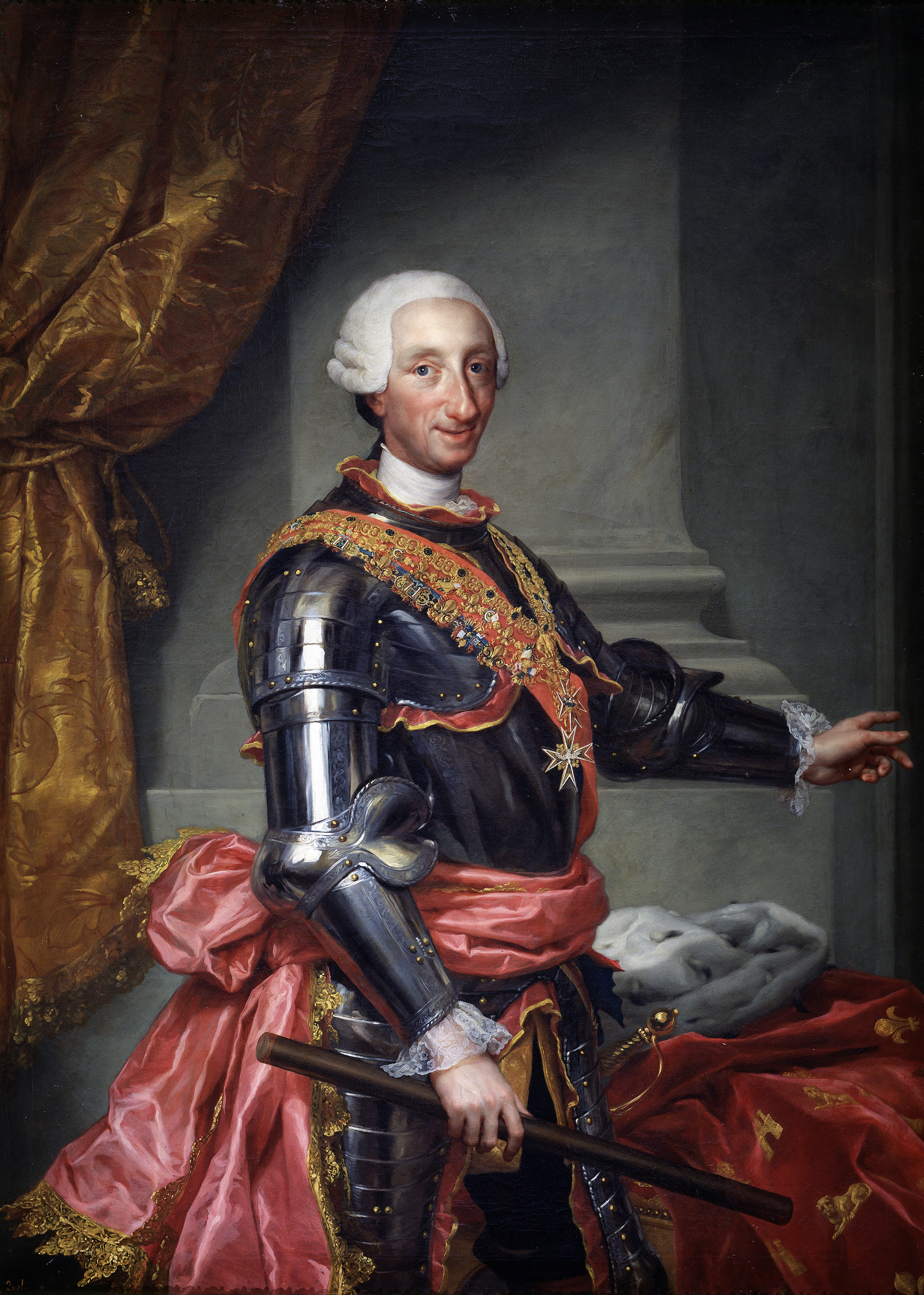
Charles III of Spain

- December 14
  - Carl Philipp Emanuel Bach, German composer (b. 1714)
  - King Charles III of Spain (b. 1716)
- December 19 – Juan Bautista de Anza, Governor of the Spanish Province of New Mexico (b. 1736)
- December 22 – Percivall Pott, English surgeon (b. 1714)
- December 30 – Francesco Zuccarelli, Italian painter, elected to the Venetian Academy (b. 1702)
- Date unknown
  - Lucia Galeazzi Galvani, Italian scientist (b. 1743)
  - Martha Wray, English businesswoman and medical manufacturer (b. 1739)

1789

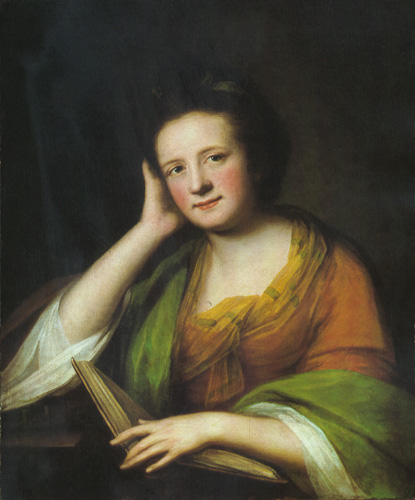
Frances Brooke

- January 1 – Fletcher Norton, 1st Baron Grantley, English politician (b. 1716)
- January 4
  - Johan Jacob Bruun, Danish artist (b. 1715)
  - Thomas Nelson Jr., American signer of the Declaration of Independence and Governor of Virginia (1781) (b. 1738)
- January 8 – Jack Broughton, English boxer (b. 1703)
- January 10 – James Mitchell Varnum, American brigadier general of the Revolutionary War, Continental Congressman for Rhode Island (b. 1748)
- January 13 – Joseph Spencer, American major general of the Revolutionary War, Continental Congressman for Connecticut (b. 1714)
- January 23 – Frances Brooke, English writer (b. 1724)
- January 25 – James Randolph Reid, American Continental Congressman for Connecticut (b. 1750)
- February 2 – Armand-Louis Couperin, French composer and keyboard player (b. 1727)
- February 12 – Ethan Allen, American major general of the Revolutionary War, Vermont statesman (b. 1738)
- February 19 – Nicholas Van Dyke, American lawyer and President of Delaware (b. 1738)
- March 23 – Thomas Osborne, 4th Duke of Leeds, British politician (b. 1713)
- April 5 – William Vane, 2nd Viscount Vane of Ireland (b. 1714)

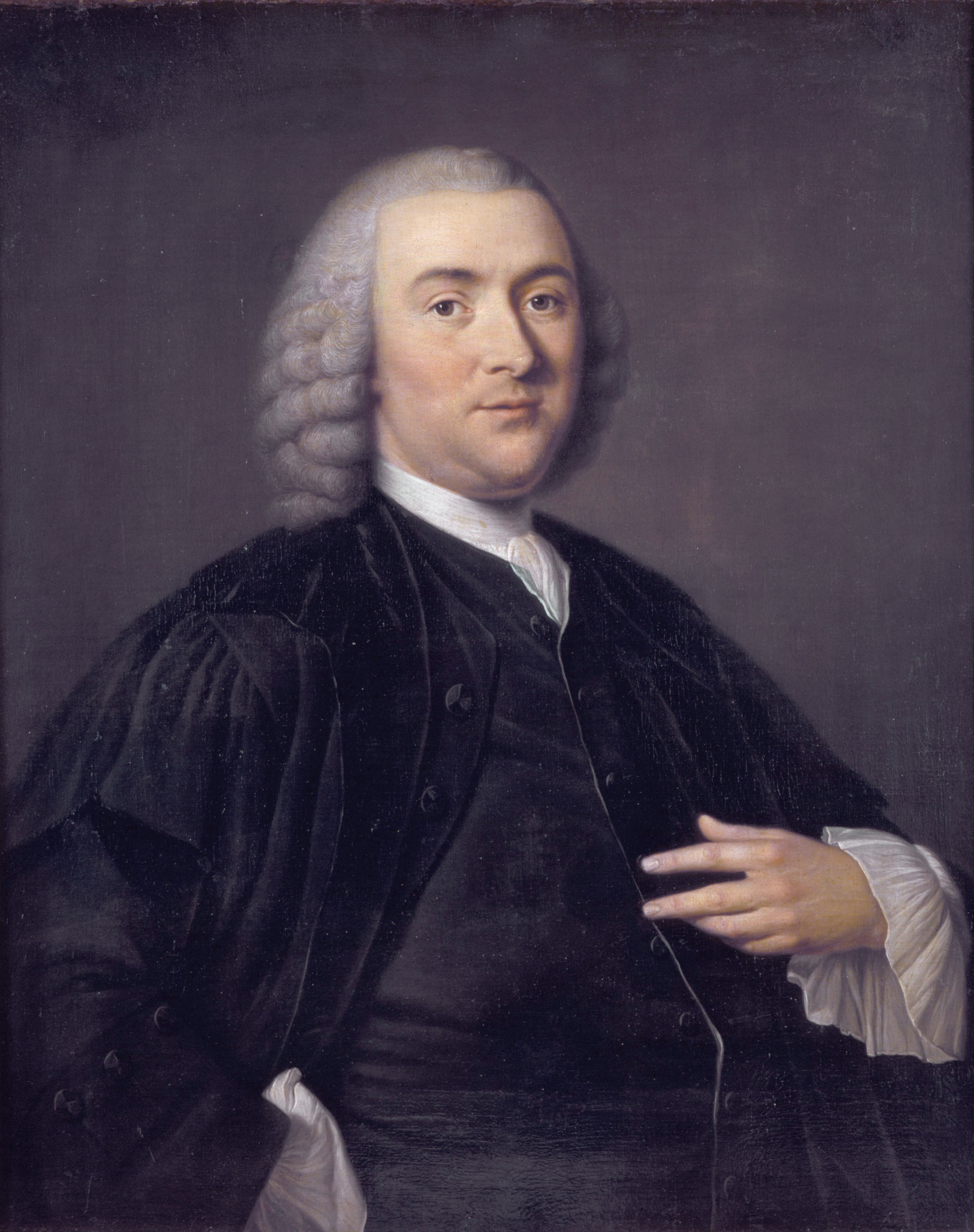
Petrus Camper

- April 7
  - Abdul Hamid I, Ottoman Sultan (b. 1725)
  - Petrus Camper, Dutch anatomist (b. 1722)
- April 13 – Joseph Spencer, American colonel of the Revolutionary War, Continental Congressman for New Hampshire (b. 1739)
- April 26 – Count Petr Ivanovich Panin, Russian soldier (b. 1721)
- May 5 – Giuseppe Marc'Antonio Baretti, Italian literary critic (b. 1719)
- May 9
  - Jean-Baptiste Vaquette de Gribeauval, French artillery specialist (b. 1715)
  - Anders Johan von Höpken, Swedish politician (b. 1712)
- May 15 – Jean-Baptiste Marie Pierre, French painter (b. 1714)
- May 25 – Anders Dahl, Swedish botanist (b. 1751)
- June 4 – Louis Joseph, Dauphin of France, son of Louis XVI (tuberculosis) (b. 1781)
- June 6 – Charles Thomas, Prince of Löwenstein-Wertheim-Rochefort, German nobleman, head of the House of Löwenstein-Wertheim-Rochefort (b. 1714)
- June 15 – Marcus Fredrik Bang, Norwegian bishop (b. 1711)
- July 13 – Victor de Riqueti, marquis de Mirabeau, French economist (b. 1715)
- July 14 – Jacques de Flesselles, French provost (assassinated) (b. 1721)
- July 15 – Jacques Duphly, French composer and harpsichordist (b. 1715)
- July 16 – Domenico Caracciolo, Italian politician (b. 1715)
- July 22 – Joseph Foullon de Doué, French politician (executed) (b. 1715)
- July 30 – Giovanna Bonanno, Italian poisoner, alleged witch (b. c. 1713)
- August 22 – Johann Heinrich Tischbein, German artist (b. 1722)
- September 4 – Paul Spooner, American lieutenant governor of Vermont (1782–1787) (b. 1746)

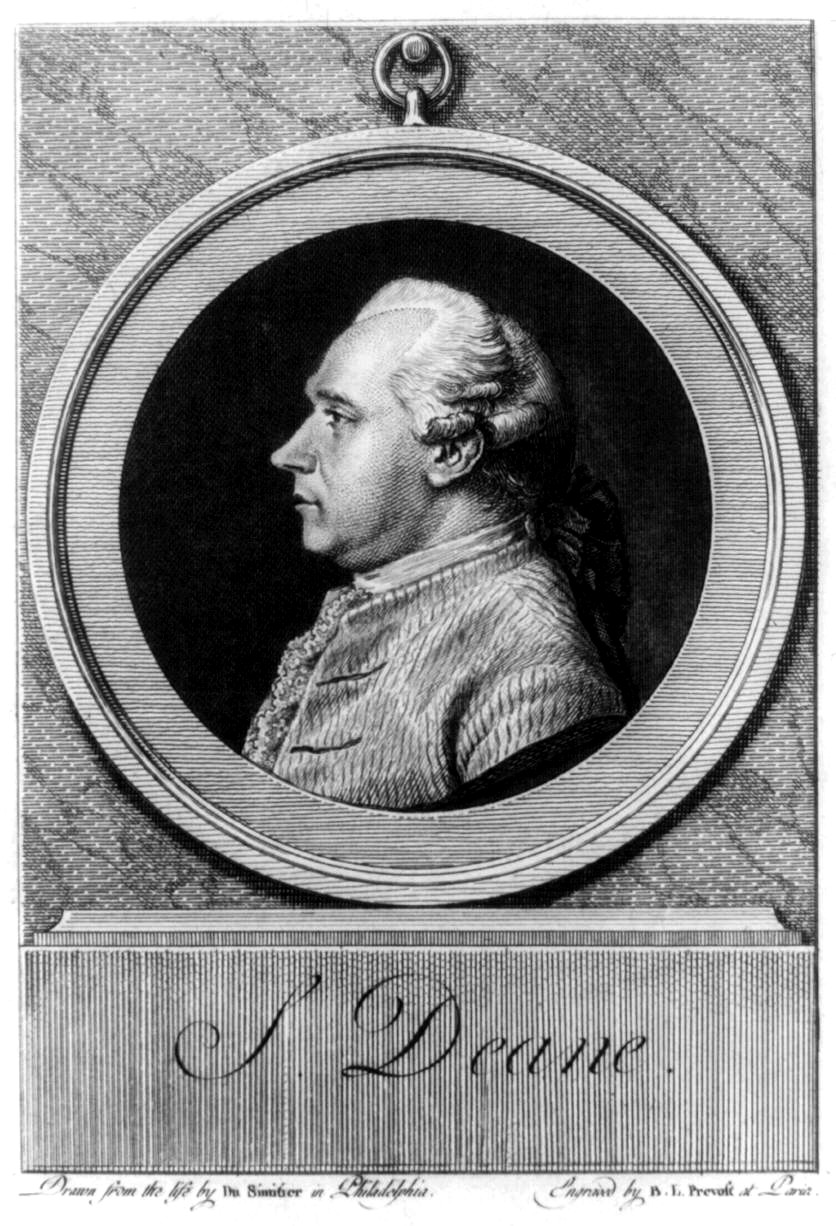
Silas Deane

- September 23
  - John Rogers, American Continental Congressman for Maryland (b. 1723)
  - Silas Deane, American Continental Congressman for Connecticut (b. 1737)
- October 9 – James Hamilton, 8th Earl of Abercorn (b. 1712)
- October 27 – John Cook, American farmer, President of Delaware (b. 1730)
- October 28 (bur.) – Mary Evans, Welsh sect leader (b. 1735)
- November 10 – Richard Caswell, American major general of the Revolutionary War, Continental Congressman and Governor of North Carolina (1776–80, 1785–87) (b. 1729)
- November 17 – Samuel Holden Parsons, American major general of the Revolutionary War, member of the Connecticut House of Representatives (b. 1737)
- November 26 – John Elwes, English miser and politician (b. 1714)
- December 3 – Claude Joseph Vernet, French painter (b. 1714)
- December 10 – William Pierce, American member of the Georgia House of Representatives, Continental Congressman for Georgia (c. 1753)
- December 12 – John Ponsonby, Irish politician (b. 1713)
- December 23 – Charles-Michel de l'Épée, French philanthropist, developer of signed French (b. 1712)
