= Heidsieck =

Heidsieck is a surname. Notable people with the surname include:

- Charles Camille Heidsieck (1820–1871), 19th-century French Champagne merchant (Charles Heidsieck)
- Éric Heidsieck (born 1936), French pianist
- Florens-Louis Heidsieck (1749–1828), was the founder of the Champagne house Heidsieck & Co
- Bernard Heidsieck (1928–2014), French sound poet
- Emmanuelle Heidsieck (born 1963), French writer and journalist
