= 1785 =

1785 in various calendars
- Gregorian calendar: 1785; MDCCLXXXV
- Ab urbe condita: 2538
- Armenian calendar: 1234; ԹՎ ՌՄԼԴ
- Assyrian calendar: 6535
- Balinese saka calendar: 1706–1707
- Bengali calendar: 1191–1192
- Berber calendar: 2735
- British Regnal year: 25 Geo. 3 – 26 Geo. 3
- Buddhist calendar: 2329
- Burmese calendar: 1147
- Byzantine calendar: 7293–7294
- Chinese calendar: 甲辰年 (Wood Dragon); 4482 or 4275 — to — 乙巳年 (Wood Snake); 4483 or 4276
- Coptic calendar: 1501–1502
- Discordian calendar: 2951
- Ethiopian calendar: 1777–1778
- Hebrew calendar: 5545–5546
- Hindu calendars
- Vikram Samvat: 1841–1842
- Shaka Samvat: 1706–1707
- Kali Yuga: 4885–4886
- Holocene calendar: 11785
- Igbo calendar: 785–786
- Iranian calendar: 1163–1164
- Islamic calendar: 1199–1200
- Japanese calendar: Tenmei 5 (天明５年)
- Javanese calendar: 1711–1712
- Julian calendar: Gregorian minus 11 days
- Korean calendar: 4118
- Minguo calendar: 127 before ROC 民前127年
- Nanakshahi calendar: 317
- Thai solar calendar: 2327–2328
- Tibetan calendar: ཤིང་ཕོ་འབྲུག་ལོ་ (male Wood-Dragon); 1911 or 1530 or 758 — to — ཤིང་མོ་སྦྲུལ་ལོ་ (female Wood-Snake); 1912 or 1531 or 759

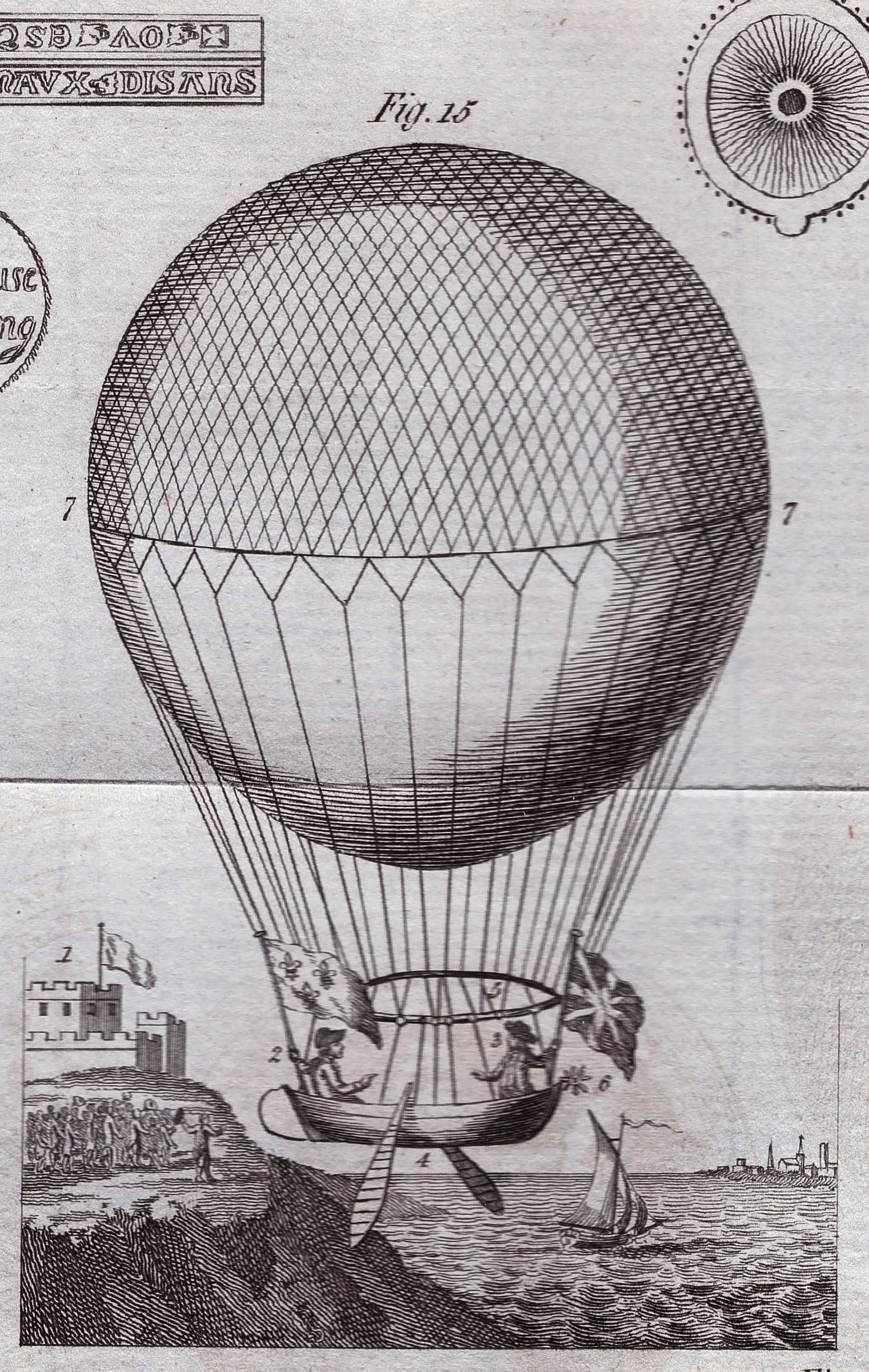
January 7: Jean-Pierre Blanchard and John Jeffries become first aeronauts to fly across the English Channel.

1785 (MDCCLXXXV) was a common year starting on Saturday of the Gregorian calendar and a common year starting on Wednesday of the Julian calendar, the 1785th year of the Common Era (CE) and Anno Domini (AD) designations, the 785th year of the 2nd millennium, the 85th year of the 18th century, and the 6th year of the 1780s decade. As of the start of 1785, the Gregorian calendar was 11 days ahead of the Julian calendar, which remained in localized use until 1923.

== Events ==
=== January–March ===
- January 1
  - The Burmese Konbaung Dynasty annexes the Mrauk U Kingdom of Arakan.
  - The first issue of the Daily Universal Register, later known as The Times, is published in London.
- January 7 – Frenchman Jean-Pierre Blanchard and American John Jeffries travel from Dover, England to Calais, France in a hydrogen gas balloon, becoming the first to cross the English Channel by air.
- January 11 – Richard Henry Lee is elected as President of the U.S. Congress of the Confederation.
- January 20 – Battle of Rạch Gầm-Xoài Mút: Invading Siamese forces, attempting to exploit the political chaos in Vietnam, are ambushed and annihilated at the Mekong River by the Tây Sơn.
- January 27 – The University of Georgia in the United States is chartered by the Georgia General Assembly meeting in Savannah. The first students are admitted in Athens, Georgia in 1801.
- February 9 – Sir Warren Hastings, who has been governing India on behalf of King George III as the Governor-General of the Presidency of Fort William (later British India), resigns. Sir John Macpherson administers British India until General Charles Cornwallis arrives 19 months later.
- February 27 – The Confederation Congress votes an $80,000 expense to establish diplomatic relations with Morocco.
- March 7 – Scottish geologist James Hutton first presents his landmark work, Theory of the Earth; or an Investigation of the Laws observable in the Composition, Dissolution, and Restoration of Land upon the Globe to the Royal Society of Edinburgh.
- General Henry Knox is appointed as the Confederation Congress's Secretary of War, with added duties as the Secretary of Navy, both functions later of the U.S. Department of Defense.
- March 10
  - American engineer James Rumsey sends a letter to George Washington informing of his plans to create a steamboat.
  - Thomas Jefferson is appointed the new U.S. Minister to France, and Benjamin Franklin's request for permission to return home is accepted.

=== April–June ===
- April 19 – The Commonwealth of Massachusetts cedes all of its claims to territory west of New York State to the United States Confederation Congress. The area will become the southern portions of Michigan and Wisconsin.
- April 21 – The Empress Catherine the Great of the Russian Empire issues the Charter to the Towns, providing for "a coherent, unified system of administration" for new governments organized in Russia.
- April 26 – John Adams is appointed as the U.S. ambassador to the United Kingdom, and Thomas Jefferson as ambassador to France.
- April 28 – Astronomer William Herschel begins his second series of surveys of the stars, published in 1789.
- May 10 – An unmanned hot air balloon released as part of a bet crashes in Tullamore, Ireland, causing a fire that burns down about 100 houses, making it the world's first aviation disaster (by 36 days). The town’s coat of arms now represents a phoenix emerging from the ashes.
- May 20 – The Land Ordinance of 1785, setting the rules for dividing the U.S. Northwest Territory (later Ohio, Indiana, Illinois, Wisconsin and Michigan) into townships of 36 square miles apiece, is passed by the Confederation Congress. The survey system will later be applied to the continent west of the Mississippi River.
- May 23 – Benjamin Franklin receives a patent for bifocals.
- June 3 – The United States' Continental Navy is disbanded.
- June 15 – After several attempts, Jean-François Pilâtre de Rozier and his companion, Pierre Romain, set off in a balloon from Boulogne-sur-Mer, but the balloon suddenly deflates (without the envelope catching fire) and crashes near Wimereux in the Pas-de-Calais, killing both men, making it the first fatal aviation disaster.

=== July–September ===
- July 2 – Don Diego de Gardoqui arrives in New York City as Spain's first minister to the United States.
- July 6 – The dollar (and a decimal currency system) is unanimously chosen as the money unit for the United States by the Congress of the Confederation.
- July 16 – The Piper-Heidsieck Champagne house is founded by Florens-Louis Heidsieck in Reims, France.
- August 1 – The fleet of French explorer Jean-François de Galaup, comte de Lapérouse leaves Paris for the circumnavigation of the globe.
- August 15 – Cardinal de Rohan is arrested in Paris; the Affair of the Diamond Necklace comes into the open.
- September 10 – The United States and the Kingdom of Prussia sign a Treaty of Amity and Commerce.
- September 13
  - The Bank of North America, central bank for the Confederation Congress government, loses its charter.
  - Benjamin Franklin returns to Philadelphia after seven years as the U.S. Ambassador to France and prepares to take office as the new Governor of Pennsylvania.

=== October–December ===
- October 5 – Vincenzo Lunardi of Italy becomes the first person to pilot a balloon over Scotland.
- October 13
  - The first newspaper in British India, the English-language Madras Courier, is published. It continues publication as a weekly until 1794.
  - France mints new Louis d'or coins, with the image of King Louis XVI on the obverse, and one-sixth less gold than the coins with King Louis XV's image.
- October 17 – The Commonwealth of Virginia stops the importation of new African slaves by declaring that "No persons shall henceforth be slaves within this commonwealth, except such as were so on the seventeenth day of October, 1785, and the descendants of the females of them."
- October 18 – Benjamin Franklin takes office as the new President of the Supreme Council of Pennsylvania, at the time the equivalent of a republic as one of the 13 independent governments of the United States of America under the Articles of Confederation.
- November 23 – John Hancock of Massachusetts, the former President of the Continental Congress, is selected as the new President of the Congress of the Confederation, but is unable to take office because of illness.
- November 28 – The Treaty of Hopewell is signed between the United States of America and the Cherokee Nation.
- December 11 – An edict is issued limiting Masonic lodges throughout the Holy Roman Empire by Emperor Joseph II. With the exception of Vienna, Budapest and Prague, no Empire province may have more than one lodge.

=== Date unknown ===
- The University of New Brunswick is founded in Fredericton, New Brunswick.
- Coal gas is first used for illumination.
- Louis XVI signs a law that a handkerchief must be square.
- The British government establishes a permanent land force in the Eastern Caribbean, based in Barbados.
- Belfast Academy (later Belfast Royal Academy) is founded by Rev. James Crombie in Belfast, Northern Ireland.
- Friedrich Heinrich Jacobi publishes Letters on the Teachings of Spinoza, and starts the Pantheism controversy of the 1780s.
- Napoleon Bonaparte becomes a lieutenant in the French artillery.
- Cabinet des Modes, the first fashion magazine, is published in France.
- Mozart's "Haydn" String Quartets are published, as is his collaboration with Salieri and a third, unknown composer, Cornetti, Per la ricuperata salute di Ofelia.
- Charles Adams, John Adams’ son and John Quincy Adams's brother, enters Harvard in August at age 15. A few months later, he starts to drink often and to get into trouble, and is almost expelled when he is caught running naked through the Campus while drunk with other boys.

== Births ==
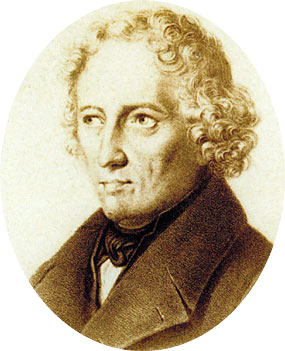
Jacob Grimm

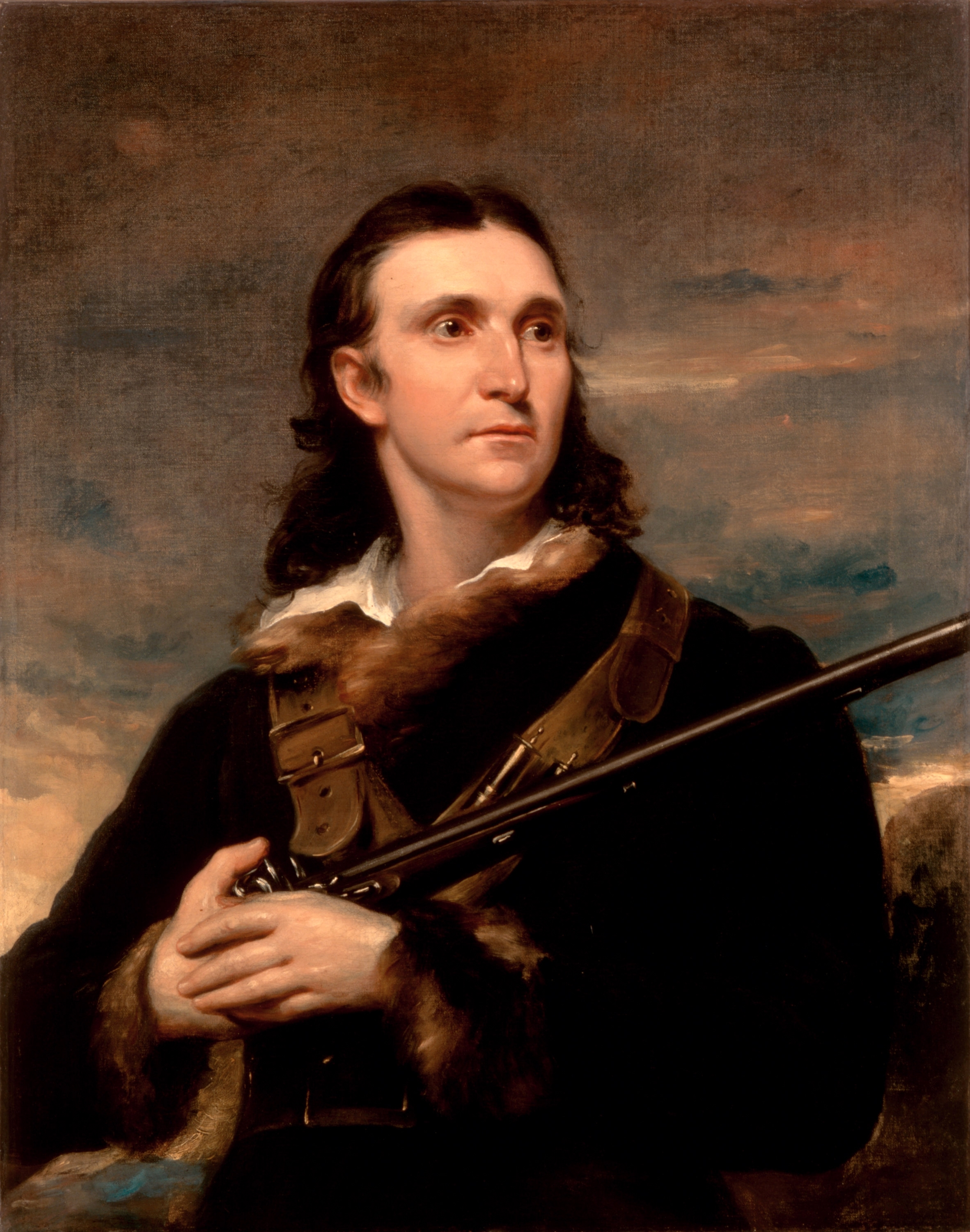
John James Audubon

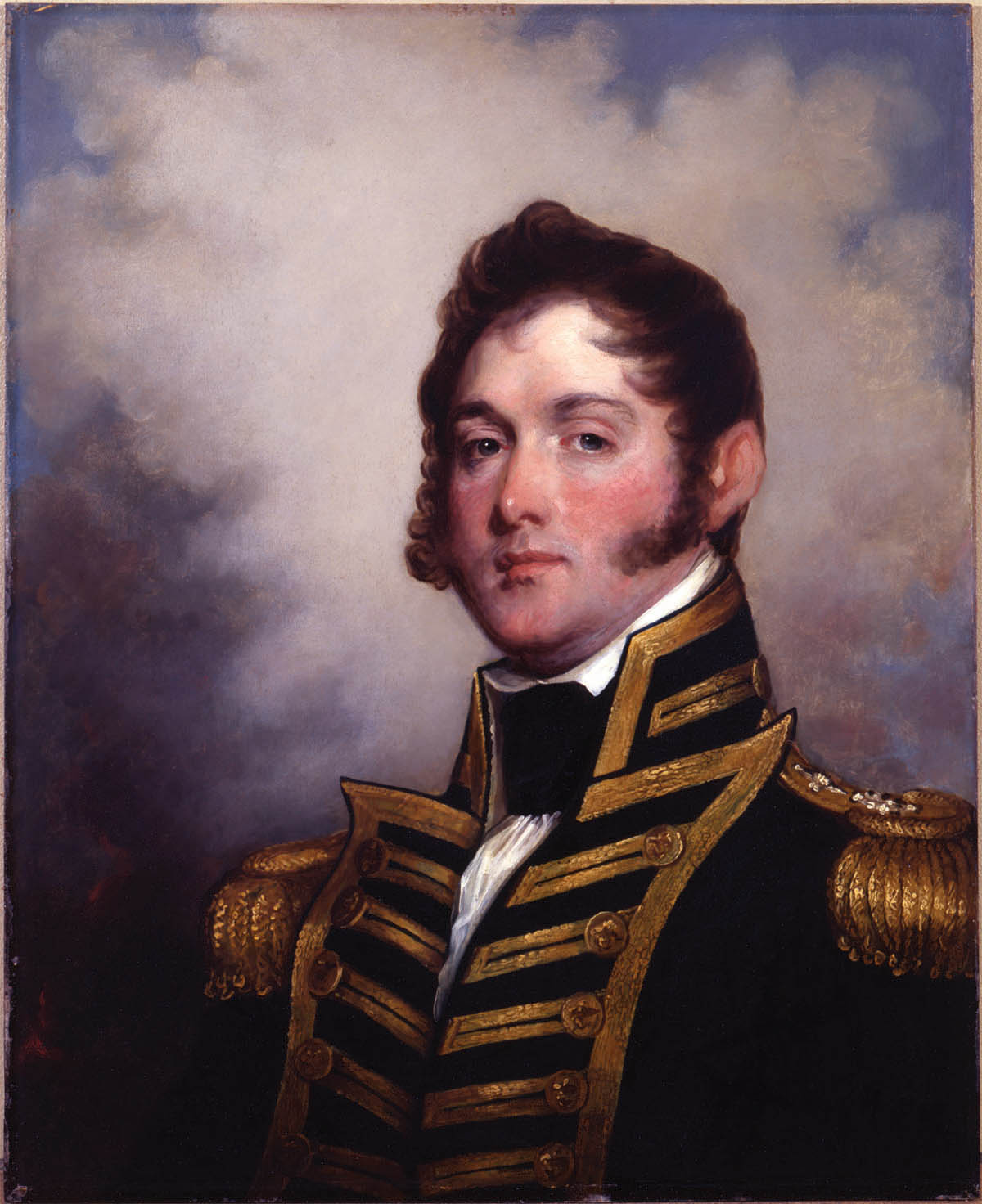
Oliver Hazard Perry

- January 4
  - Jacob Grimm, German philologist, folklorist, and writer (d. 1863)
  - Friedrich Wilhelm, Duke of Schleswig-Holstein-Sonderburg-Glücksburg (d. 1831)
- January 15 – William Prout, English chemist, physician, and natural theologian (d. 1850)
- January 20 – Theodor Grotthuss, German-Lithuanian chemist (d. 1822)
- February 8 – Martín Miguel de Güemes Argentine military leader (d. 1821)
- February 10 – Claude-Louis Navier, French engineer, physicist (d. 1836)
- February 26 – Anna Sundström, Swedish chemist (d. 1871)
- March 11
  - John McLean, American politician, Associate Justice of the Supreme Court of the United States (d. 1861)
  - Eleonore Prochaska, German heroine soldier (d. 1805)
- March 17 – Ellen Hutchins, Irish botanist (d. 1815)
- March 27 – Louis XVII of France (d. 1795)
- April 4 – Bettina von Arnim, German poet (d. 1859)
- April 26 – John James Audubon, French-American naturalist, illustrator (d. 1851)
- April 29 – Karl Drais, German inventor, creator of a precursor to the bicycle (d. 1851)
- May 18 – John Wilson, Scottish writer (d. 1854)
- May 20 – Marcellin Champagnat, French Catholic saint (d. 1840)
- May 22 – John Hindmarsh, English naval officer, first Governor of South Australia (d. 1860)
- July 6 – William Jackson Hooker, English botanist (d. 1865)
- July 20 – Mahmud II, Ottoman sultan (d. 1839)
- August 15 – Thomas de Quincey, English writer (d. 1859)
- August 23 – Oliver Hazard Perry, American naval officer (d. 1819)
- August 27 – Agustín Gamarra, Peruvian general and politician, 10th and 14th President of Peru (d. 1841)
- September 27 – David Walker, African-American abolitionist (d. 1830)
- October 15 – José Miguel Carrera, Chilean general, founding father (d. 1821)
- October 17 – Gunatitanand Swami, born Mulji Sharma, Indian paramahamsa of the Hindu Swaminarayan Sampraday sect (d. 1867)
- October 18 – Thomas Love Peacock, English satirist (d. 1866)
- October 20 – George Ormerod, English historian and antiquarian (d. 1873)
- November 11 – Diponegoro, Javanese Prince (d. 1855)
- November 18 – David Wilkie, Scottish painter (d. 1841)
- November 21 – William Beaumont, American physician and surgeon (d. 1853)
- November 28 – Victor de Broglie, Prime Minister of France (d. 1870)
- December 17 – Dorothea Lieven, Latvian diplomat, politically active princess (d. 1857)
- December 23 – Christian Gobrecht, American engraver, designer of the United States Seated Liberty coinage (d. 1844)
- December 26 – Étienne Constantin de Gerlache, 1st Prime Minister of Belgium (d. 1871)

== Deaths ==
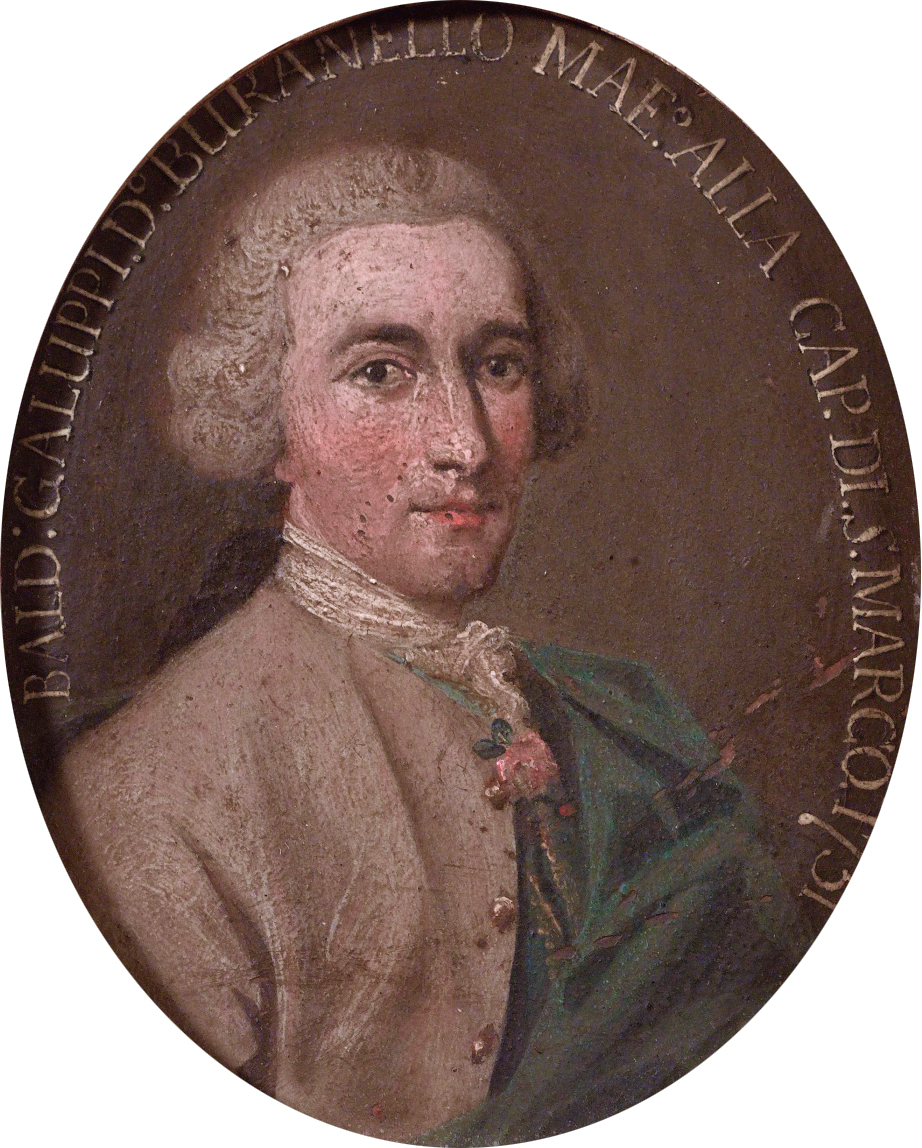
Baldassare Galuppi

- January 3 – Baldassare Galuppi, Italian composer (b. 1706)
- January 6 – Haym Salomon, Polish-Jewish American financier of the American Revolution (b. 1740)
- January 19 – Jonathan Toup, English classical scholar, critic (b. 1713)
- January 23 – Matthew Stewart, Scottish mathematician (b. 1717)
- February 24 – Sir Thomas Dyke Acland, 7th Baronet (b. 1722)
- February 26 – Barbara Erni, Liechtenstein confidence trickster (b. 1743)
- March 14 – Giovanni Battista Locatelli, Italian opera director (b. 1713)
- April 14 – William Whitehead, English writer (b. 1715)
- April 26 – Johan Samuel Augustin, German-Danish astronomical writer, civil servant (b. 1715)
- May 8
  - Étienne François, duc de Choiseul, French statesman (b. 1719)
  - Pietro Longhi, Venetian painter (b. 1701)
- June 2
  - Jean Paul de Gua de Malves, French mathematician (b. 1713)
  - Gottfried August Homilius, German composer, cantor and organist (b. 1714)
- June 30 – James Oglethorpe, English general, founder of the state of Georgia (b. 1696)
- July 5 – Anne Poulett, British politician (b. 1711)
- July 6 – Frederick August I, Duke of Oldenburg (b. 1711)
- July 9 – William Strahan, British politician (b. 1715)
- July 12 – Louis-René de Caradeuc de La Chalotais, French jurist on the so-called "Brittany affair" (b. 1701)
- July 13 – Stephen Hopkins, Founding Father of the United States (b. 1707)
- July 17 – Margaret Bentinck, Duchess of Portland, British duchess (b. 1715)
- August 17 – Jonathan Trumbull, Governor of the Colony and the state of Connecticut (b. 1710)
- August 26 – George Germain, 1st Viscount Sackville, British soldier, politician (b. 1716)
- August 28 – Jean-Baptiste Pigalle, French sculptor (b. 1714)
- August 31 – Pietro Chiari, Italian playwright (b. 1712)
- September 19 – Maria Antonia Ferdinanda of Spain, Queen consort of Sardinia (b. 1729)
- September 30 – Johann Jakob Moser, German jurist (b. 1701)
- October 4
  - David Brearley, delegate to the U.S. Constitutional Convention (b. 1703)
  - Alexander Runciman, Scottish painter (b. 1736)
- November 13 – Joaquín Ibarra, Spanish printer (b. 1725)
- November 15 – César Gabriel de Choiseul, French officer (b. 1712)
- November 18 – Louis Philippe I, Duke of Orléans, French soldier, writer (b. 1725)
- November 19 – Bernard de Bury, French composer (b. 1720)
- November 20 – James Wright, Governor of Georgia (b. 1716)
- November 25 – Richard Glover, English poet (b. 1712)

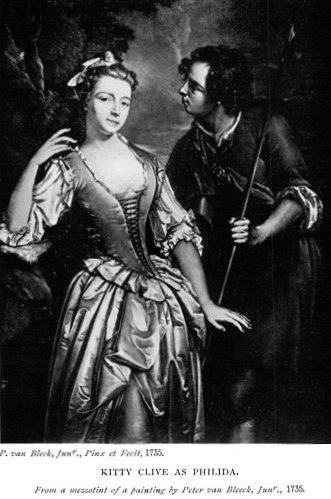
Kitty Clive

- December 6 – Kitty Clive, English actress, playwright (b. 1711)
- December 29 – Johan Herman Wessel, Norwegian author (b. 1742)
- date unknown
  - Faustina Pignatelli, Italian mathematician (b. 1705)
