= Champagne Charlie (miniseries) =

1989 French-Canadian television miniseries

- Genre: Drama
- Based on: Champagne Charlie by Joseph Henriot
- Written by: Robert Geoffrion
- Directed by: Allan Eastman
- Starring: Hugh Grant; Megan Gallagher; Megan Follows
- Theme music composer: Georges Garvarentz
- Countries of origin: Canada; France
- Original language: English
- No. of episodes: 2

Production
- Producers: Thierry Caillon; David J. Patterson
- Cinematography: Michel Cénet
- Editor: Tim Williams
- Running time: 190 minutes

Original release
- Network: CTV
- Release: 15 January – 17 January 1989

Champagne Charlie is a 1989 French-Canadian dramatic television miniseries, directed by Allan Eastman and starring Hugh Grant, Megan Gallagher, Megan Follows and Béatrice Agenin.

== Production ==
In 1982, Joseph Henriot (1936–2015) published "Champagne Charlie" in France. It is based on the novel by Joseph Henriot and depicts the life of the nineteenth century wine merchant Charles Heidsieck. In 1994, Joseph Henriot left Veuve Clicquot to manage Champagne Henriot. The Henriot family also own Château de Poncié, Bouchard Père & Fils, and William Fèvre

It had a budget of $7 million. Hugh Grant said "I play the archetypal hero. I hit people in the face, I rescue pretty girls. They fall in love with me. I'm a man, I'm charming. All the things I wanted to be. It's a very nice role, really."

== Cast ==
- Hugh Grant : Charles Heidsieck
- Megan Gallagher : Pauline
- Megan Follows : Louise Heidsick
- Stéphane Audran : Thérèse
- Georges Descrières : Pierre-Henri
- Jean-Claude Dauphin : Ernest
- Alexandra Stewart : Cécile
- Vladek Sheybal : Count Plasky
- R. H. Thomson : Robert Morgan
- Kenneth Welsh : John Whistlow
- August Schellenberg : General Butler
- Denis Forest : Paul Lampin
- Chas Lawther : David McLeod
- Hagan Beggs : Tom McLeod
- Vlasta Vrána : Hawkins
- Tom Rack : Abraham Lincoln
- Béatrice Agenin : Madame de Ghuilain
- Pier Paolo Capponi : Consul de Ghuilain
