= Charles Heidsieck (champagne) =

Champagne company

Coordinates: 49.2157295°N 4.0090389°E

Charles Heidsieck is the smallest of the Grandes Marques champagne Houses. Based in the Reims region of Champagne, it is one of the best-known producers for both vintage and non-vintage cuvée. It has been part of EPI group since 2011. The house was founded in 1851 by the French champagne maker Charles Camille Heidsieck, who became known as Champagne Charlie.

== History ==
Charles Heidsieck was born in 1822 into an eminent Reims family whose wine-making traditions date back to Florens-Louis Heidsieck (see Heidsieck & Co). In 1851, at age 29, he founded a wine house (Maison) bearing his own name. He began to sell his champagne abroad, starting in Belgium and in England, and in 1852 he travelled to the United States, becoming the first merchant to market his own champagne there. He was a larger than life dandy and became something of a social sensation, one New York newspaper describing him as "Champagne Charlie". He visited on three further occasions until the American Civil War disrupted trade. He returned to New York in an unsuccessful effort to recover debts owed by his agents and on visiting the south he became trapped by the conflict. In July 1862, Charles Heidsieck was arrested as a spy while travelling to New Orleans trying to flee back to France. He was sent to the infamous Fort Jackson in Louisiana. After many pleas, and the intercession of President Lincoln himself, Charles was released in November 1862, but he returned to France sick and bankrupt. His business was subsequently saved because a debt was repaid in deeds to land in Colorado where, shortly afterwards, there was a silver boom which turned the obscure village of Denver into valuable estate.

Charles Heidsieck focused on selecting, blending and ageing wines to produce higher quality champagnes, buying grapes from individual growers. In 1867 he purchased several old chalk quarries, called crayères which dated from the Gallo-Roman era, in order to create optimal conditions for wine maturation. Their cellars are now inscribed on the UNESCO World Heritage List along with others champagne vineyards, houses and cellars.

His showmanship and the quality of his wines earned him royal warrants from many of the royal and imperial families of the time.

For a long period Charles Heidsieck was owned by the Henriot group. In 1985, Charles Heidsieck became part of the Rémy Cointreau wine and spirits group, and was sold in 2011 to privately owned French luxury goods group EPI (Société européenne de participations industrielles) founded by Christopher Descours.

Charles Heidsieck Brut Réserve are aged in the cellars for at least five years before release.

== Cuvées ==
- Brut Réserve :
- Rosé Réserve
- Blanc des Millénaires 1995 (Prestige Cuvée)
- 2005 Vintage Brut
- 2006 Vintage Rosé
- 2008 Vintage Brut
- 2012 Vintage Brut

== See also ==
- Charles Heidsieck
- Heidsieck & Co
- List of Champagne houses
- Piper-Heidsieck
