= Sorrentinos =

Pasta stuffed with filling

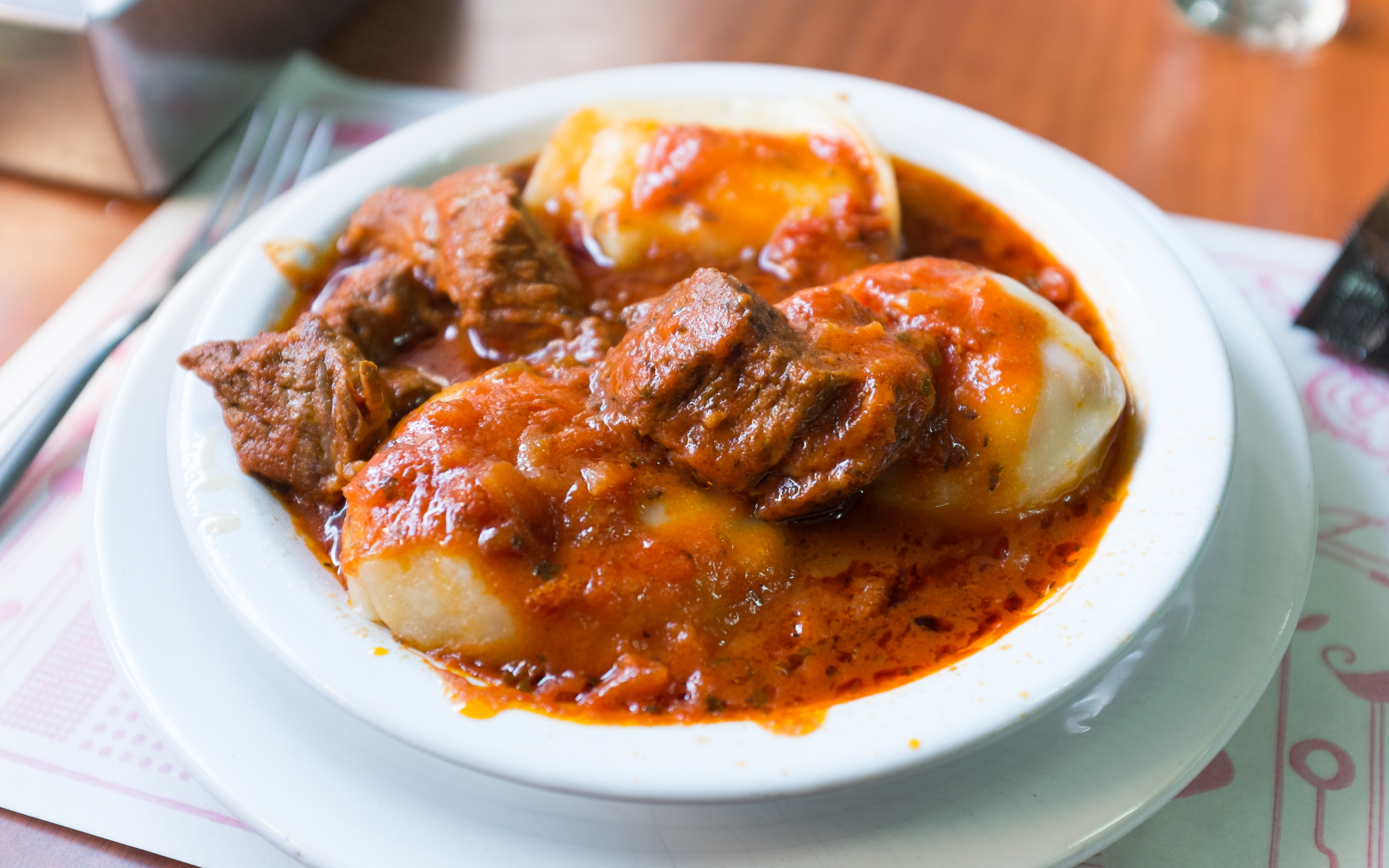
- Sorrentinos with Bolognese sauce
- Type: Pasta, dumplings
- Place of origin: Argentina
- Region or state: Mar del Plata, Buenos Aires
- Main ingredients: Flour, water, eggs, filling

Sorrentinos are a type of Argentine ravioli, but larger, more circular and originally wrapped without fluted edge. The dough is made with flour and eggs, and the filling of the original recipe consists of York ham and mozzarella.

== History ==
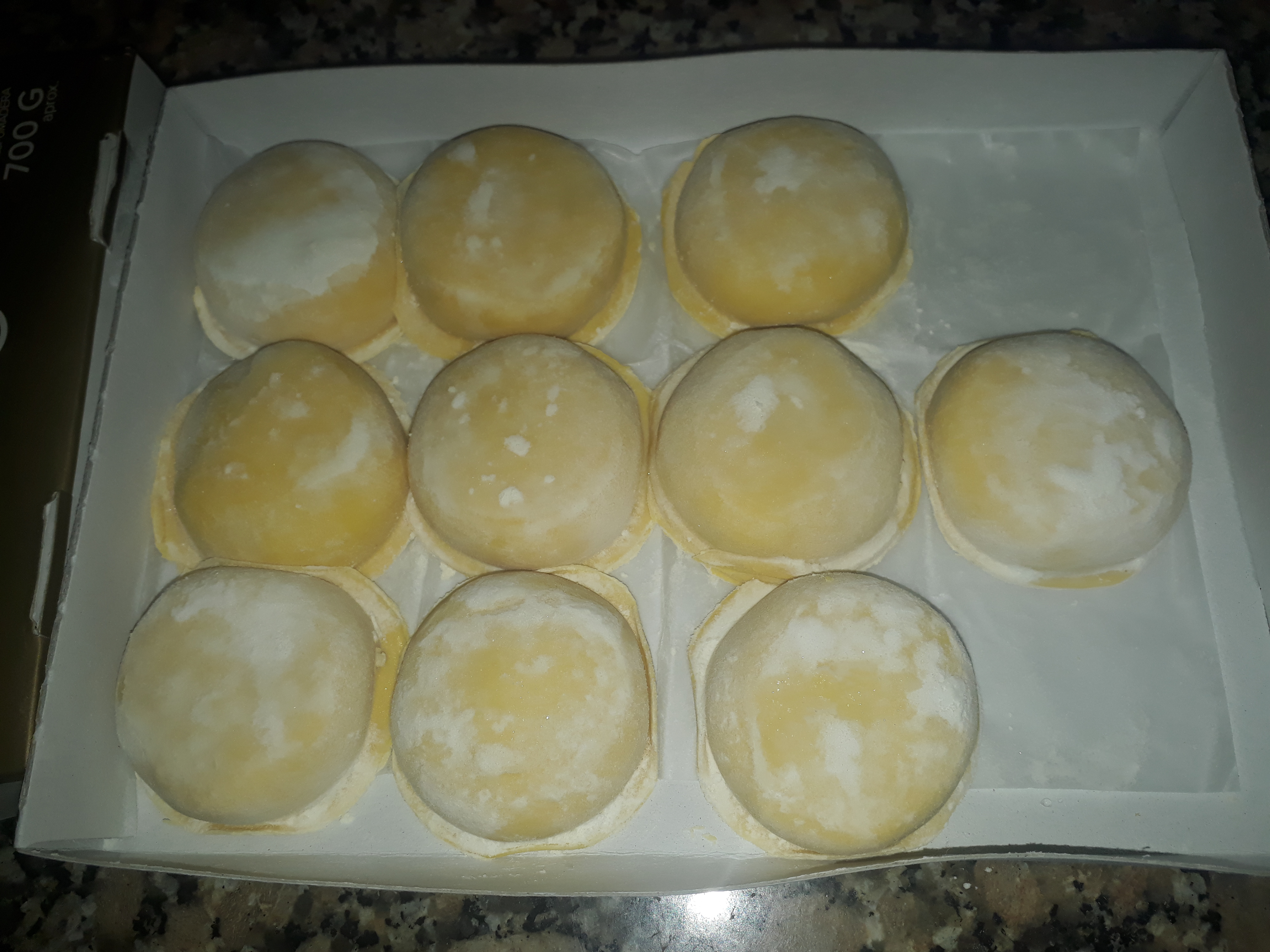
Fresh sorrentinos without fluted edge, as per the original recipe

Italian-Argentine chef Donato Di Santis says that sorrentinos are not an Italian pasta, and almost certainly have their origins in the Rio de La Plata region. It is believed that sorrentinos are a local variant of the Italian ravioli capresi, whose dough is instead elaborated with flour, water and olive oil, while the filling is made with caciotta cheese, flavoured with oregano.

Most sources point to an Italian immigrant from Sorrento, Rosalía Pérsico or his son Cayetano Pérsico, who created this pasta while working in a famous trattoria of Mar del Plata, while other sources state that they originated in another restaurant in Mar del Plata called Sorrento. There is a slightly different version of the later story, in which a chef from Mar del Plata made the first sorrentinos in a Buenos Aires' restaurant whose name is also Sorrento. Argentino "Chiche" Véspoli, another immigrant from Sorrento was the owner of the first restaurant to serve up the dish, and recognized as such by Sorrento's authorities and the Sorrento's chapter of Lions Club.

== Ingredients ==
The dough is made with flour and eggs, and they have a variety of fillings that can combine mozzarella, ricotta, York ham, spinach, pumpkin, chard, caramelized onions or nuts. There are variants that add fish, herbs and olives to the filling, like salmon mixed with rosemary or tuna with parsley and olives. The use of poultry is not unusual. In the original recipe, the pasta was shaped with the border of a cup. There are gluten-free and vegan recipes, with the dough made of rice flour, water and oil. The sauce for Sorrentinos in the original recipe is the "Véspoli's sauce", a mix of melted cheese, spinach and basil.

== See also ==
- Argentine cuisine
