= Charles Heidsieck =

French champagne merchant

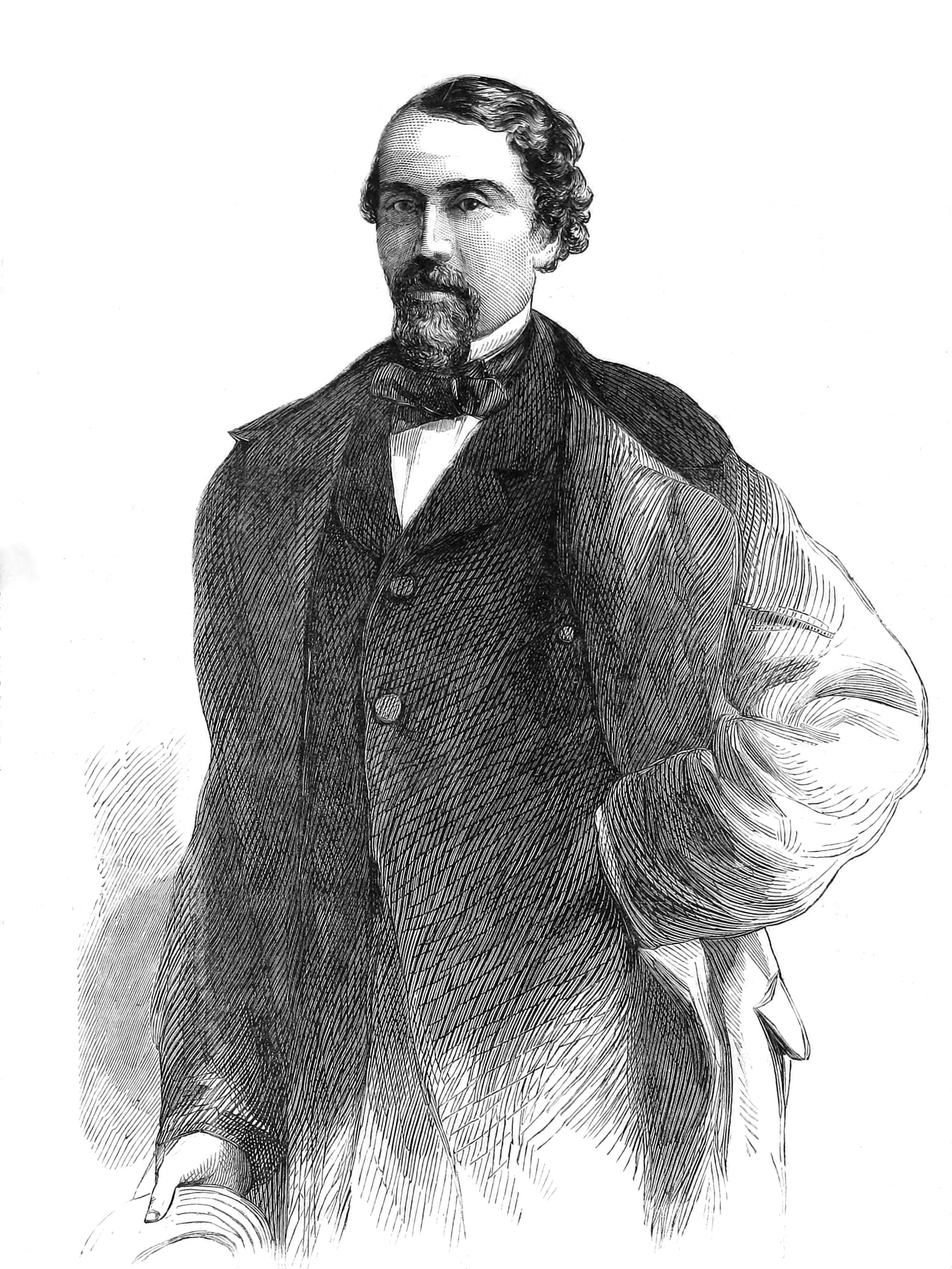
- Image of Charles Heidsieck used in champagne ads in the US during the 1850s
- Born: Charles-Camille Heidsieck; 16 June 1822; France
- Died: 3 February 1893 (aged 70); France
- Occupation: Champagne merchant
- Spouse: Amélie Henriot
- Parent(s): Charles-Henri Heidsieck & Emilie Henriot

Charles-Camille Heidsieck (1822–1893) was a French champagne merchant who founded the champagne firm Charles Heidsieck in 1851. He is credited with popularizing champagne in the United States and was known as "Champagne Charlie" during his stay.

During the American Civil War Heidsieck was imprisoned under suspicion of being a spy for the French government and the Confederacy. His imprisonment sparked an international incident between France and US over what became known as The Heidsieck Incident.

== Family history ==
Charles-Camille Heidsieck was the son of Charles-Henri Heidsieck, a champagne merchant who was famous for riding into Moscow on a white stallion in 1811 just ahead of Napoleon's advancing army. Heidsieck arrived with cases of his champagne and his order book, ready to celebrate with whichever side would win the upcoming battle.

Charles-Henri was the nephew of Florens-Louis Heidsieck, co-founder of the champagne house that eventually became Piper-Heidsieck, and cousin of Henri-Louis Walbaum and Pierre Auguste Heidsieck who founded the house that eventually became known as Heidsieck & Co Monopole. Charles Camille was married to Amélie Henriot.

== Champagne Charlie ==
In 1852, Charles Heidsieck first visited the United States and toured the New England area and New York State. He quickly saw the potential for the American market and retained an agent to facilitate his import sales. The mass import of champagne was met with roaring success and record sales. When Heidsieck returned five years later, he was greeted in New York City with pomp and celebration with massive newspaper coverage and banquet receptions held in his honor. With this and subsequent trips, he developed the persona of Champagne Charlie that was a fixture of the New York high society scene.

== Setbacks during the American Civil War ==
In 1861, Charles Heidsieck received news of the conflict breaking out in the United States Civil War. With more than half of his company's assets tied into unpaid accounts in the US, Heidsieck quickly left Reims and set sail for the US. Upon his arrival, he was informed by his sales agent that a new law passed by Congress aimed at absolving Northerners from having to give payment for cotton purchased from the South, also absolved the agent from having to pay his debt to Heidsieck.

With no other recourse, Charles Heidsieck set out for New Orleans seeking repayment directly from the merchants that received the champagne. With the conflict of war, Heidsieck had to travel in secrecy into the South. This meant going as far out of the way as Kansas to avoid detection by the Union Army. Upon his arrival in April 1862, he found the city to be nearly bankrupt and incapable of paying their debts financially. One merchant did have a warehouse full of cotton that was in high demand in Europe due to the shortages caused by the Union blockade. Heidsieck accepted the cotton as payment and attempted to smuggle the cotton out of the port in Mobile, Alabama with the use of two blockade runners. Despite ordering the ships to take different routes in hopes that at least one would make it past the blockade, both ships were intercepted and sunk with all cargo destroyed.

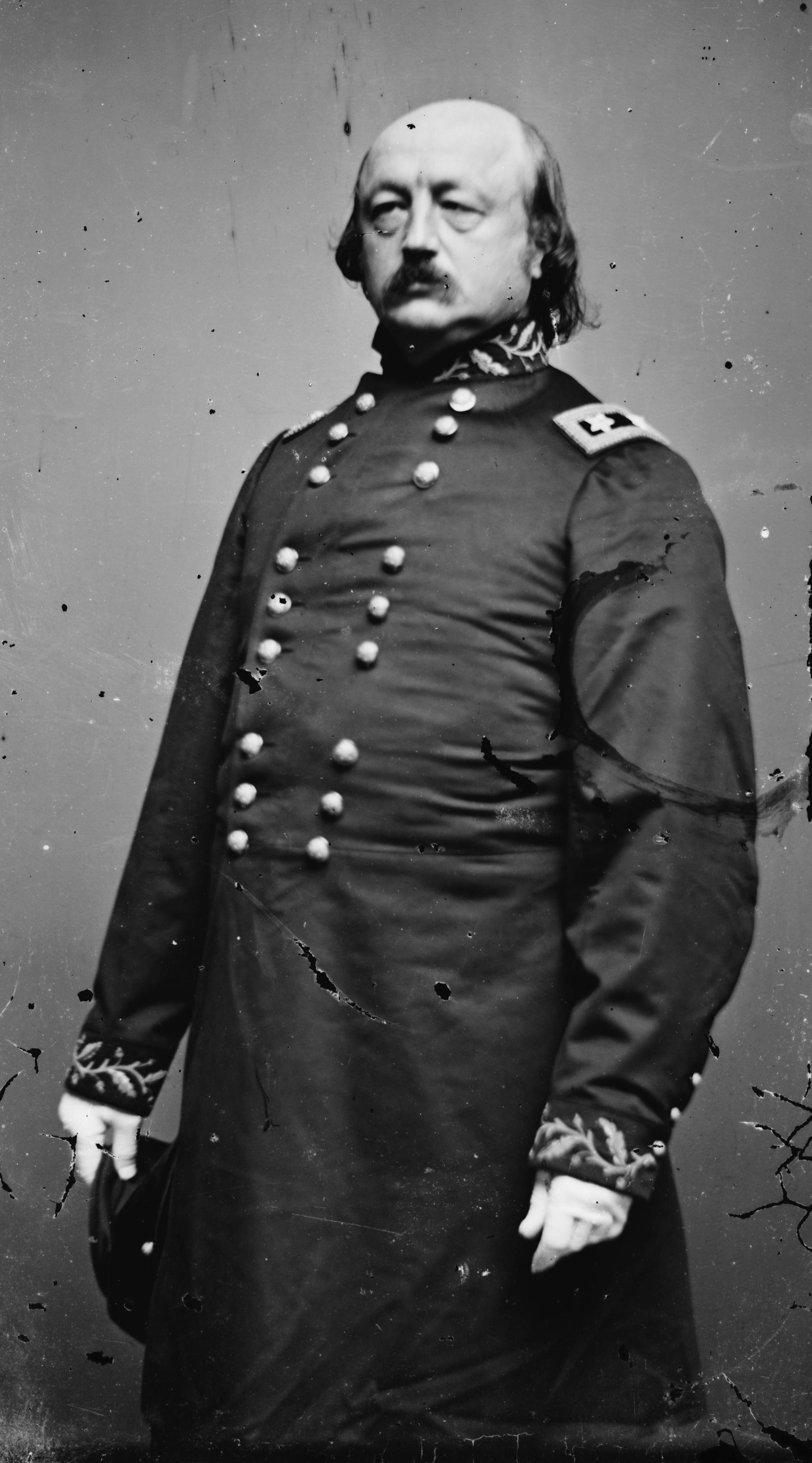
General Butler (pictured) had Heidsieck held for over 7 months in a Union prison on charges of spying.

By this time, all routes to the North were completely sealed so Heidsieck went to New Orleans and attempted to charter a boat to Mexico or Cuba in hopes of making it back to Europe. To facilitate his passage, the French consul in Mobile gave him a diplomatic pouch with a request to deliver some documents to the consulate in New Orleans. Arriving in New Orleans on 5 May 1862, he found that the city had fallen to Union forces and was immediately seized upon his arrival by General Benjamin F. Butler. Within the diplomatic pouch that was given to Heidsieck by the Mobile consulate were documents from French textile manufacturers about supplying the Confederate armies with their uniforms. Despite Heidsieck's pleas of innocence and ignorance about the documents, he was charged with spying and imprisoned in Fort Jackson, Louisiana.

Charles Heidsieck's imprisonment caused a diplomatic incident between the French and US government in what became known as the Heidsieck Incident. Several times, French diplomats and even Napoleon III contacted President Abraham Lincoln campaigning for Heidsieck's release. His release was finally granted on 16 November 1862. By this time, he was in frail health with his business bankrupt and his wife selling off family property to pay for his debts. Heidsieck returned to France, demoralized and broke.

== Rebound and success ==
In early 1863, Charles Heidsieck was approached by an American missionary with a packet of papers and a letter from the United States. The letter was from the brother of Heidsieck's former agent in New York. The man was ashamed of how his brother cheated Heidsieck out of his obligations and offered him a stack of deeds to land in Colorado as a means of repayment.

It turned out that the deeds were of land that accounted for a third of Denver, then a small village, which was soon to blossom into one of the largest and wealthiest cities of the American West. After a few years, Heidsieck was able to sell the land and repay all his debts. With the excess fortune, he was able to relaunch his champagne house and quickly re-establish it as one of Champagne's premier houses.

== Media portrayals ==
In 1982, Joseph Henriot (1936–2015) published "Champagne Charlie" in France. A 1989 French-Canadian television movie Champagne Charlie portrayed Heidsieck's life. He was played by English actor Hugh Grant.

== See also ==
- List of wine personalities
