= York ham =

Style of ham originating in Yorkshire, England

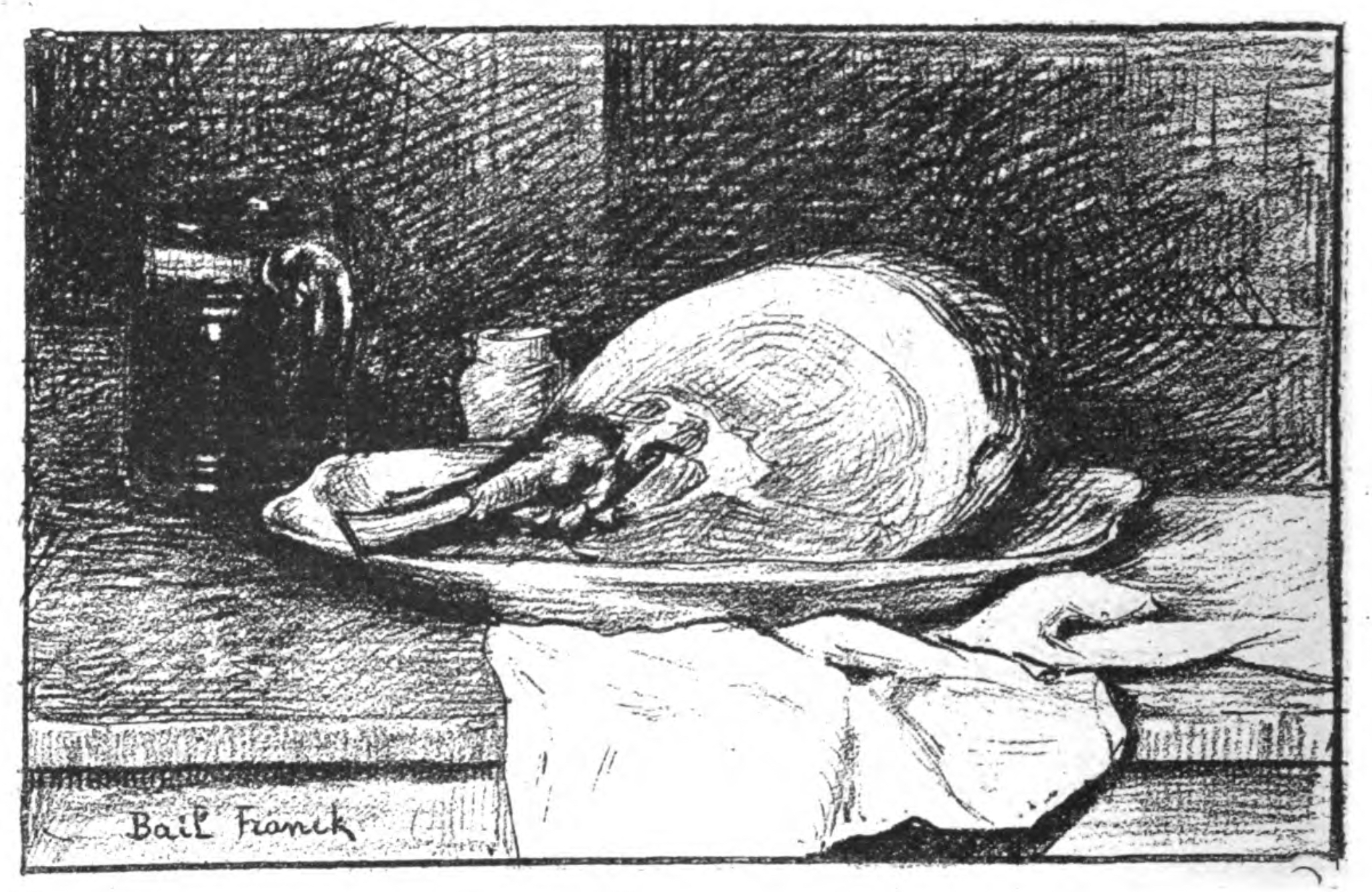
Jambon d'York (Fränck Bail, catalogue of the 1893 Paris Salon)

York ham (French: jambon d'York, formerly often called "Yorkshire ham") is a characteristic type of ham that originated in Yorkshire, England. Like prosciutto or Westphalian ham, it is made by a dry curing process, but unlike them it is eaten cooked. At its best it is widely considered one of the finest hams. However, it has never enjoyed protected designation of origin status, and has been imitated in many places. Various productions, some of doubtful nature, have been sold as York hams. Contrary to common assumptions, York hams did not originate in the City of York.

== Gastronomic reputation ==
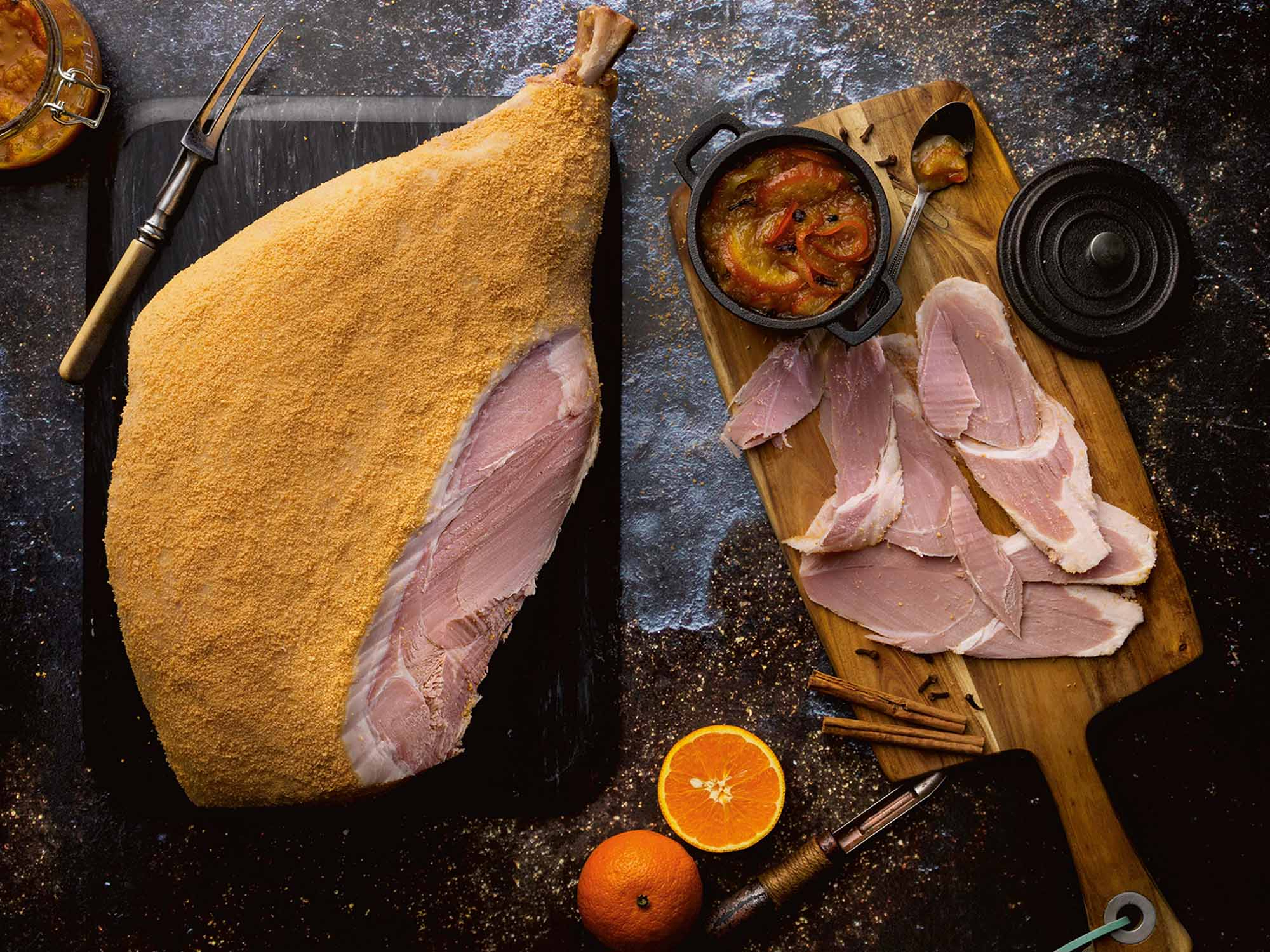
York ham on the bone, breaded (Laurence Hudghton; Dukeshill)

In his classic Le guide culinaire (1921), Auguste Escoffier said it was difficult to decide what was the best ham in the world, but the preference should go to the Prague ham for serving hot and the York ham for serving cold, although the latter was excellent hot too.

Charles Elmé Francatelli, formerly chief cook to Queen Victoria, wrote (1861):

York hams are justly considered the choicest among English hams; indeed, I am inclined to say that, excepting peculiarity of taste, no kind of hams is superior to a thorough good York ham.

Tom Stobart's Cook's Encyclopedia (1980, repub. 2016) says York ham is "at its best, regarded everywhere as the finest type of cooked ham".

Leto and Bode's The Larder Chef (2006), a professional cookbook, says that "York ham is considered to be one or the finest hams and is well known and appreciated as a delicacy on the Continent and elsewhere".

Gastronomiac, a French-language online encyclopaedia says "Le jambon d'York, d'origine anglaise, est aujourd'hui un fleuron de la gastronomie française" ("York ham, of English origin, is today an ornament of French gastronomy").

== Early history ==
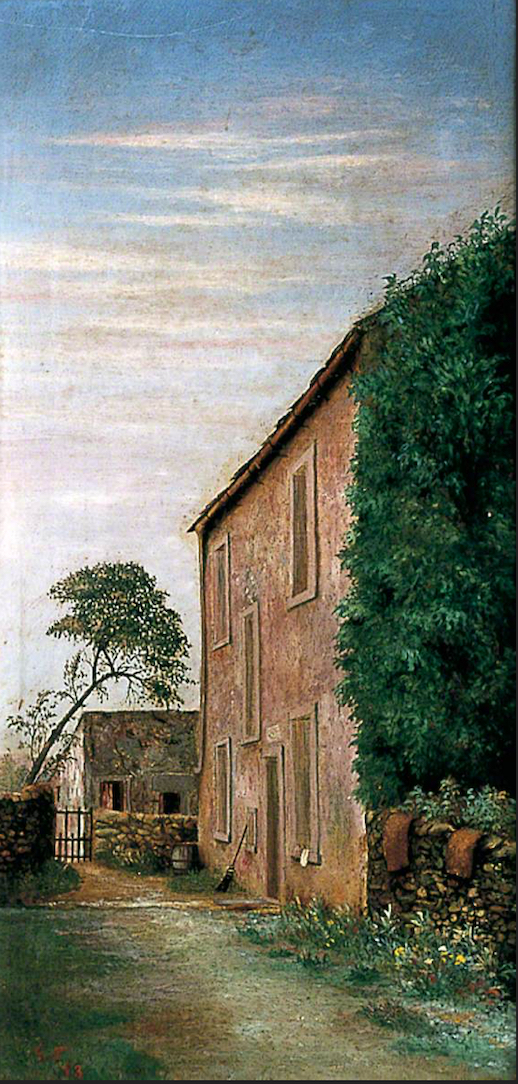
View of a Yorkshire Farmhouse (G. Towler, Museum of North Craven Life)

Before refrigeration was developed country people preserved meat over the scarce months of winter by curing hams and other parts of the family pig. Regions developed their own cures. According to historian William Stubbs, from public records of 1166 it is evident that — for whatever reason — Henry II of England got his hams from Yorkshire.

The British Agricultural Revolution signified larger food surpluses, sent to an increasingly national market. By mid 18th century Yorkshire had a London reputation for its hams. In 1740 Thomas Dyche said "this county of late years is become particularly famous for making and curing legs of pork into what are commonly called hams". Ten years later William Ellis wrote:

Yorkshire, where Land, Workmen, Labour and Hogmeat, are extraordinary cheap, and their Water Carriage of Goods to London so convenient, send great Numbers of Hams every year out of that large County to the opulent City of London, so that there are now few Cheesemongers Shops there, but what sell their Hams for about five-pence a Pound.

According to Malachy Postlethwayt (1766) there was sent to London "a kind of well prepared ham from Yorkshire". In The Art of Cookery Made Plain and Easy (1796) Hannah Glasse wrote

Yorkshire is famous for hams; and the reason is this: their salt is much finer [better] than ours in London; it is a large clear salt, and gives the meat a fine flavour.

Madam Johnson's Present had already said that 25 years before.

From about 1760 there are advertisements in the provincial and colonial newspapers for 'Yorkshire hams' (e.g. "A Parcel of exceedingly fine YORKSHIRE HAMS"), or, less frequently at first, 'York hams' (e.g. "Finest York Hams in highest preservation"). By 1830 the usage 'York ham' was the more common of the two and thereafter predominated. The expressions were interchangeable.

York was described as famous for hams in a cookbook in 1845. The phrase "the famous York hams" appears explicitly in comparative advertising in 1848, and "the celebrated York hams" in 1857. By 1861 Jambon d'York was in a book of menus for aspiring French housewives and an item that guests might hope to see served at balls in Paris.

The first mention of York ham in an haute cuisine context is on 2 April 1851, when it appears on the menu — as jambon d'York — for a banquet given for Lord Stanley at the Merchant Taylors' Hall, London. It was one of 123 dishes served to the diners, all of whom were male; ladies watched from a gallery.

== Substitution, and generic use of name ==
As, increasingly, reputable products were sold in distant markets — where the consumer did not know the producer — it became easier for suppliers to substitute spurious versions. As Richard Wilk put it:

Branding began in antiquity as a means of assuring quality, by citing the geographical origin of a commodity, as in Irish beef, Port wine or a Yorkshire ham. But the power of such location-branding was gradually lost as commodity chains grew in size and complexity. Yorkshire ham became a generic term for a particular style of curing, a fate of local products as diverse as Cheddar cheese and Tequila.

An author of a late Georgian book on domestic economy said

... it is all a farce. There is more Epping butter sold in London in a month than is made in a year; and perhaps more Yorkshire hams sold in one year than are made in Yorkshire in twenty. Therefore, let the economist [housekeeper] carry ready money to market, and buy every thing the best of its kind, not heeding from whence it comes.

Although Ireland made excellent bacon, it also exported large numbers of hogs "hastily and improperly fattened" for the Liverpool and Bristol markets, where they were slaughtered while still unwell from the journey and cured in unhygenic conditions. Most of the hams sold in London as from York were said to be tainted hams from these imported Irish hogs. An 1843 travel book agreed that London shopkeepers passed off Irish hams as and for York hams. The Practical Cook, English and Foreign (1843) — its senior author claimed to have been cook to Princes Razumovsky and Esterházy — warned its readers:

York, Cumberland, Westmoreland, and Gloucestershire are famous for their hams, but a great proportion of the hams now sold as Yorkshire are Irish

which was missed in the first edition of Mrs. Beeton's Book of Household Management but picked up in the third. One curer in Ireland sent almost his entire make of York hams to the cities of Hull and York.

In Yorkshire, hams were farmhouse products; there was no ham or bacon factory in the county until the end of the Victorian era. Hence

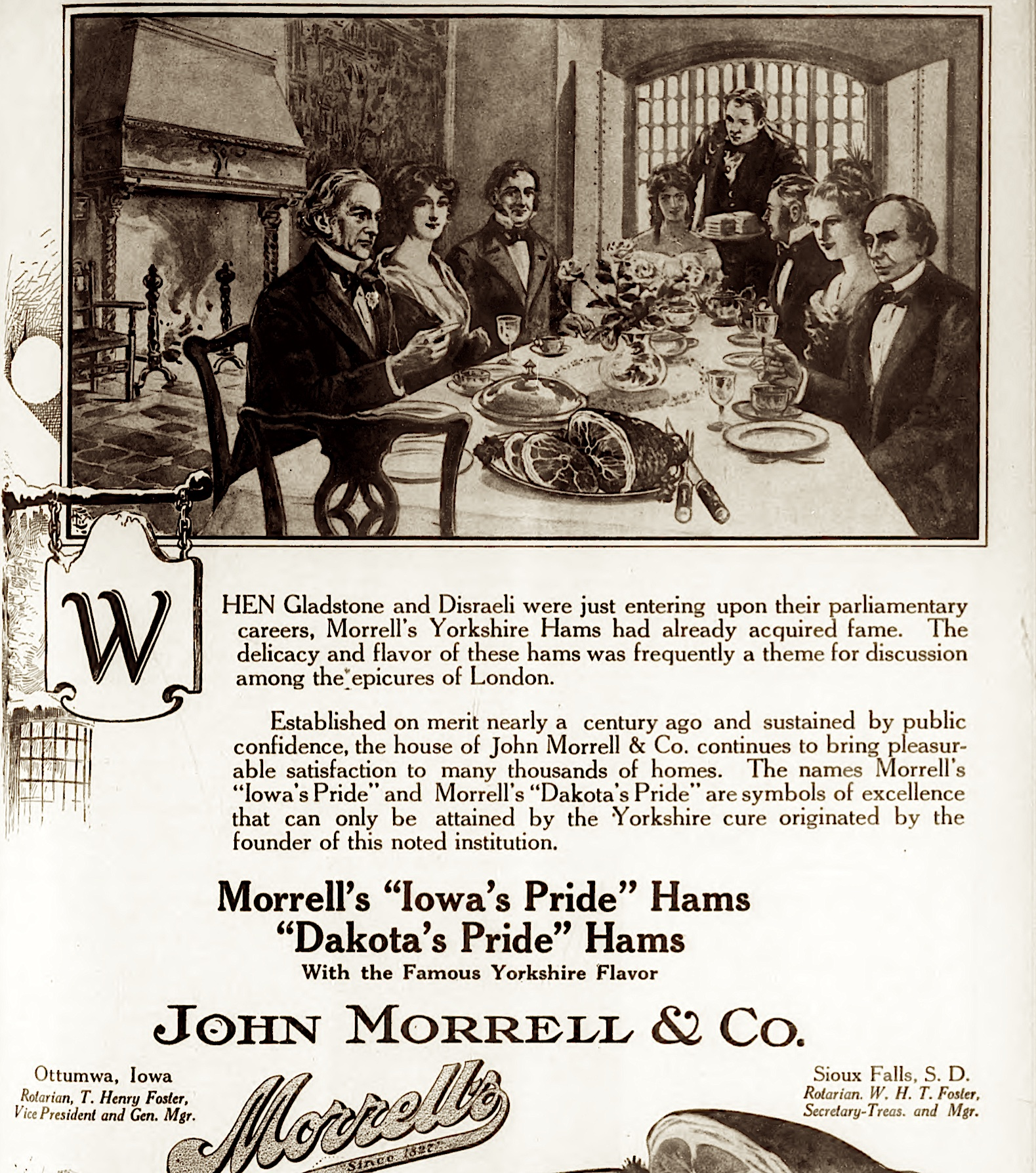
Yorkshire ham — made in the U.S.A. (American magazine, 1919)

From time immemorial the name of 'York' Hams has been synonymous with a high-class product, and on the Continent at the present day [1898] Hams sold under that name may be met with in thousands, partioularly in France. It is safe to say that few, if any of these, ever saw Yorkshire, and indeed it is common knowledge that most of them are prepared in the great factories of Ireland.

They also came from America. An unsigned article in The Boston Journal of Chemistry noted:

Cheshire cheese and Yorkshire hams were never plentier in England than at the present time, and many of the innocent customers in that little island are asking some impertinent questions as regards the capabilities of these famous counties to supply such vast quantities as are on sale, duly labelled, everywhere. Undoubtedly so long as the resources of our cheese and pork factories hold out, the people of England will have an abundance.

This was noticed in France. Urbain Dubois — who is credited with establishing the modern custom of serving dishes in sequential courses, instead of all at once — wrote that although York hams were reputed the best, the merchants of England sold many mediocre versions, which they got "from everywhere".

Thus, "York" or "Yorkshire" did not guarantee high quality ham without a trustworthy supplier: one who put his personal reputation on the packaging that secured the goods. This concept was the origin of modern branding.

== Definition ==
York ham does not have protected designation of origin status and there is no universally agreed definition of what it is.

At various times it has been claimed that a York ham should have one or more of the following attributes: a rear thigh of a pig of the Large White breed, bred, reared and killed in Yorkshire, dry-cured and aged on the bone according to a traditional procedure, in the City of York; banjo-shaped, with very white fat, a characteristic, mild savour and meat of a light colour.

Those claims are considered and referenced in the remainder of this section, but in summary, few (or no) hams today fulfil every single one of those criteria, if they ever did. "York ham" is a style of ham.

=== Terminology ===
A ham (count noun) is a cured rear leg — specifically, the thigh — of a pig. Ham (mass noun) is meat from a ham, or should be. Bacon is cured meat from another part of the animal.

=== Breed of pig ===
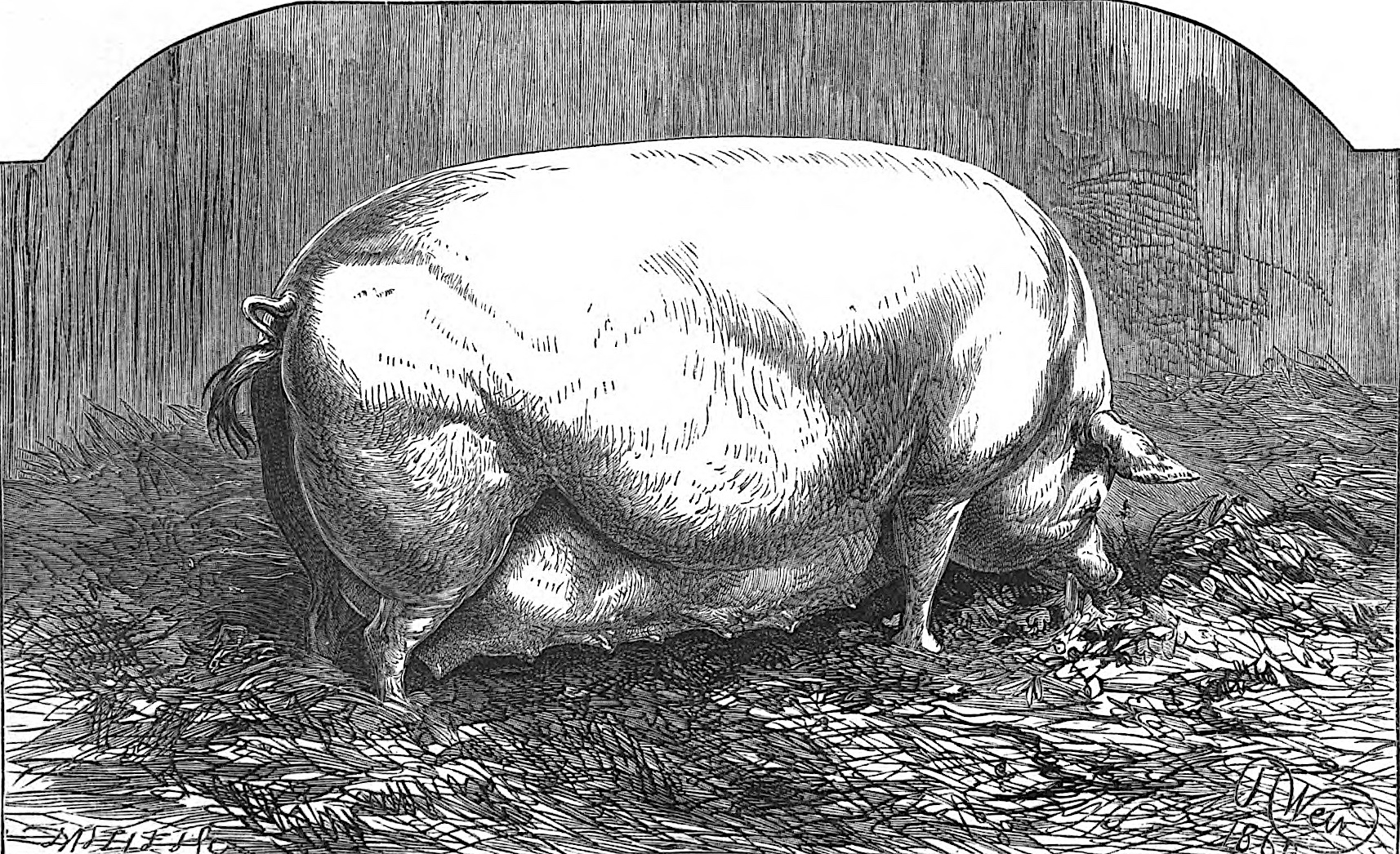
'Parian Duchess' (1860), a champion sow of the Large White ('Yorkshire') breed, said to be traditional for York ham

Several authors say York ham traditionally came from a pig of the Large White breed, known in America as the Yorkshire Pig, although York ham was being advertised before the breed was developed.

==== Origin of breed ====
The breed originated in 19th century Yorkshire, where industrial workers around Leeds, Keighley and Skipton had a strong tradition of keenly competitive, spare-time pig-breeding. According to a Victorian academic, the Large White became famous and was taken up after a Keighley weaver, Joseph Tulley, entered one in the Royal Agricultural Society's 1851 Windsor exhibition. Tulley

by considerable skill and judgment, produced the most wonderful pigs ever seen in this or perhaps any country; and his famous strain proved to be the foundation of the entire race of our modern Large White breed, which was for many years called the 'Yorkshire breed.'

Tulley sold specimens to professional breeders at high prices and they spread round the world.

The first herdbook for the Large White was published in 1884. In 1954 it represented 76% of the total male pig population of the UK.

==== The breed today ====
In recent years the Large White has seen a dramatic decline. Today it is considered a breed at risk. Of about 50 members of the British Pig Association, only three have sizeable Large White herds, and in 2022 there were only 355 registered Large Whites left.

=== Geographical origin ===
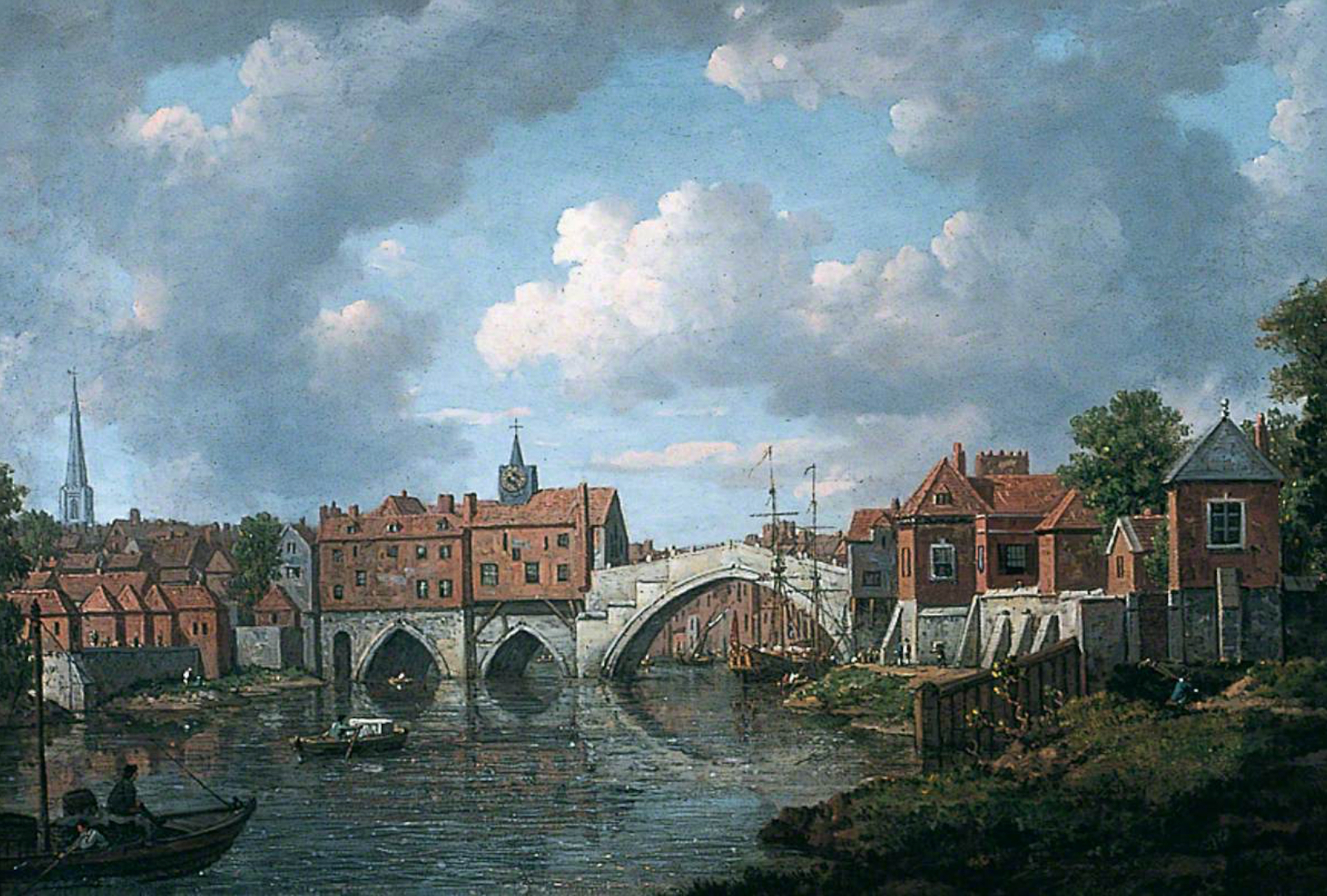
The Old Ouse Bridge, York (William Marlow, York Museums Trust). York hams were not produced in York, but it was the market town from which country hams were shipped to London.

As foreshadowed, the connection with Yorkshire was gradually lost with the passage of time.

Fell v. Army & Navy Co-Operative Society (1877) was a dispute between traders about what was York ham. The Army & Navy Stores of London had ordered 500 York hams from a Sheffield supplier, but sent them back, saying they were not proper York hams, only hams from Scotch pigs fattened for the Yorkshire market. The supplier said they were proper York hams and sued for the financial loss. The case was tried by Lord Chief Justice Coleridge and a Yorkshire jury. The supplier proved the pigs had been fed, killed and cured in Yorkshire, but not that the pigs were bred in the county, nor did he claim the hams were cured in York. The jury found in his favour and the judge strongly agreed. A meat inspector testified he could tell they were Yorkshire killed and cured by the characteristic odour. He said that if all York hams were bred in York that ancient city would be "one vast piggery".

In 1897 a Bethnal Green trader was fined for supplying a Canadian ham, cured in America, invoiced as a York ham. The evidence was that a genuine Yorkshire ham sold for at least 50% more. The magistrate asked an inspector for the trade association if all York hams were made in Yorkshire, who replied that in adjacent counties the practice was to imitate, but it was done with English meat. The Westminster Gazette commented:

This is immensely gratifying to our national pride. Yorkshire can, apparently, make no country claim to the title "York", but it must not be filched from us by enterprising traders across the water.

In early 20th century American consumer protection law, American hams were not allowed to be sold in America as York hams, but had to be called "York style" or "York cut". Since Yorkshire was a breed of pig, though, they could be called Yorkshire hams.

In 1966 The Guardian reported that tourists to York, asking where York ham was actually made, could get no satisfactory answer. (A Swiss geographer had asked the same question in 1899: "I have searched in vain among the industrial buildings for the establishments where the famous hams are prepared, which have spread the gastronomic reputation of York throughout the world".) The Birmingham Post said that a factory in Brierley Hill, near Birmingham, had been making the product since the 1860s, and now made four out of every five York hams. It did follow the traditional process, however, and was owned by Marsh & Baxter, the royal warrant holders.

A 1966 article in The Times about traditional British food names said that "The three famous hams — Bradenham, York and Seager (Suffolk) come from all over the place. Birmingham produces 80 per cent of the York hams". In 2002 a maker of Carmarthen ham in West Wales told the same newspaper it sold its rejects as York hams. Yet again according to that newspaper (2003), a prominent maker of York ham — it was the current Royal Warrant holder — obtained most of its hams from pigs farmed outside Yorkshire; they were slaughtered in Shropshire.

Jane Grigson's British Cookery (1984) said "Today, York ham has become a generalised term, meaning no more than a mild cured ham"; her opinion is cited in the current Oxford English Dictionary.

The Oxford Companion to Food (2014) defines "York ham" as the name of a curing method, saying

'York hams' are made in countries other than England, not always as well as the original.

=== City of York ===
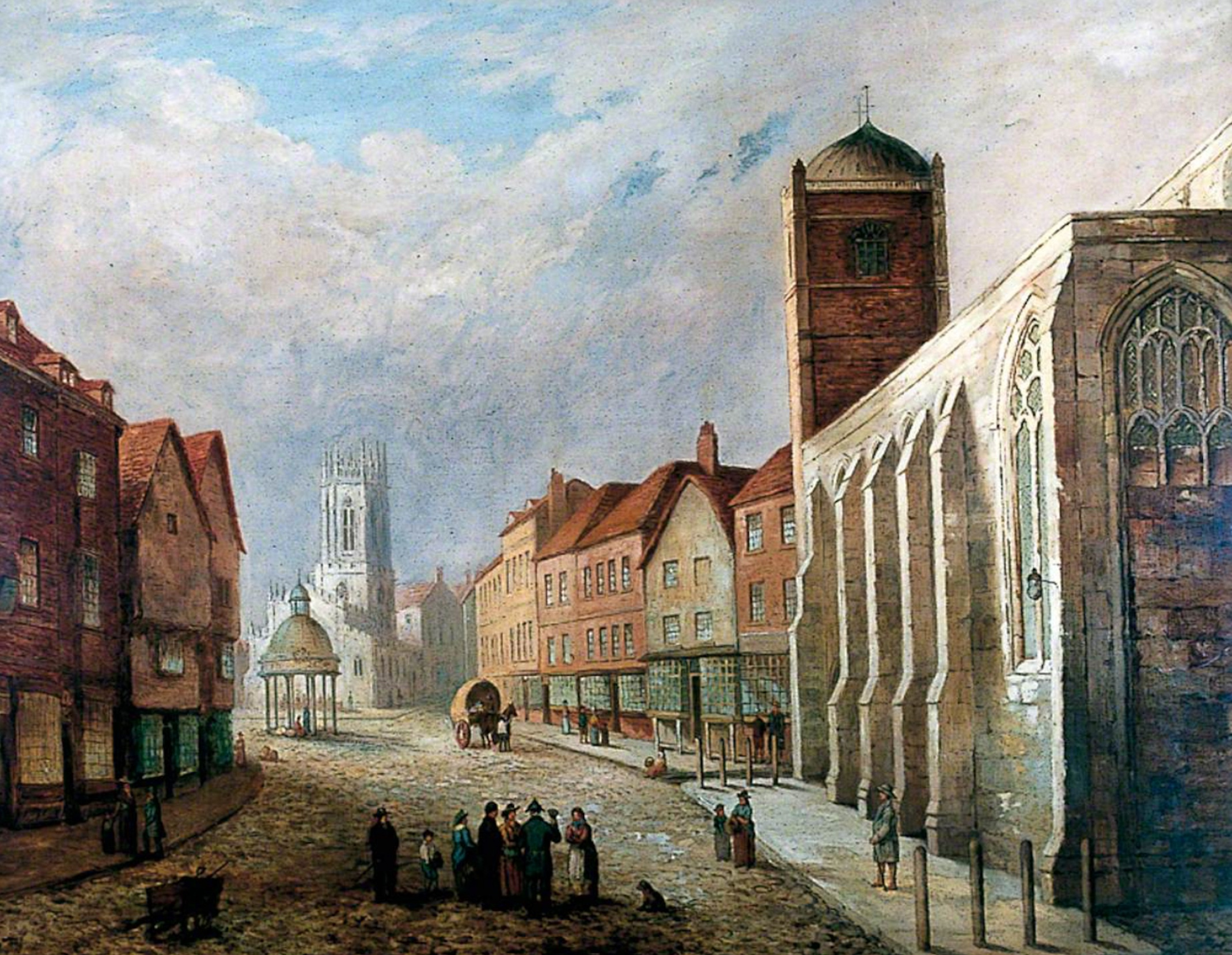
The Market Cross with St Crux, York (George Fall, York Museums Trust)

Eighteenth-century York had no notable manufactures; its economy was based on its importance as a market centre, supplied by a wide surrounding area. Hams were sent from the countryside to the market of that city, from where ships sailed to London via the River Ouse. It has been suggested, but without substantiation, that they were called 'York' hams because they arrived in London on the York stagecoach. More probably they arrived from York — which was a port — by sea. Before railways, coastal shipping was very much cheaper than carriage by land, and the River Ouse was commercially navigated up to the City of York. That they went by water is corroborated by William Ellis. The sea journey need not have harmed them; indeed York hams were said to be at their best in India, for the sea voyage improved them. The Oxford English Dictionary explains "York" can be used attributively in names of things originating in Yorkshire (the county), giving the example York ham.

Some authors have claimed York ham originated in the City of York itself, though without documenting it back very far. A common version is that York ham was "born" when a "butcher" called Robert Burrow Atkinson opened a shop in Blossom Street and discovered the cellar was perfect for maturing hams. Atkinson's York ham was popular with racegoers; by the 1960s the business had long stopped selling hams. Atkinson's premises were shown as a tourist attraction: the place where York hams originated, or at least, were made famous. But these versions accept that Atkinson did not open his shop until 1861; by then, York hams were already famous in London and fashionable in Paris. No 18th century author or early 19th century author says the famous hams of Yorkshire were made in York; Postlethwayt specifically mentions they were made and cured in the West Riding, and Samuel Lewis the East Riding.

Another purveyor was Scott's of Petersgate; but they went out of business in 2008. Country Life once claimed that York hams must be cured within 2 miles of the city centre, without saying who mandated that requirement. Tom Stobart's Cook's Encyclopedia says

York hams are not made in York — the cure is a popular one which is used all over the world.

=== Curing and maturing ===
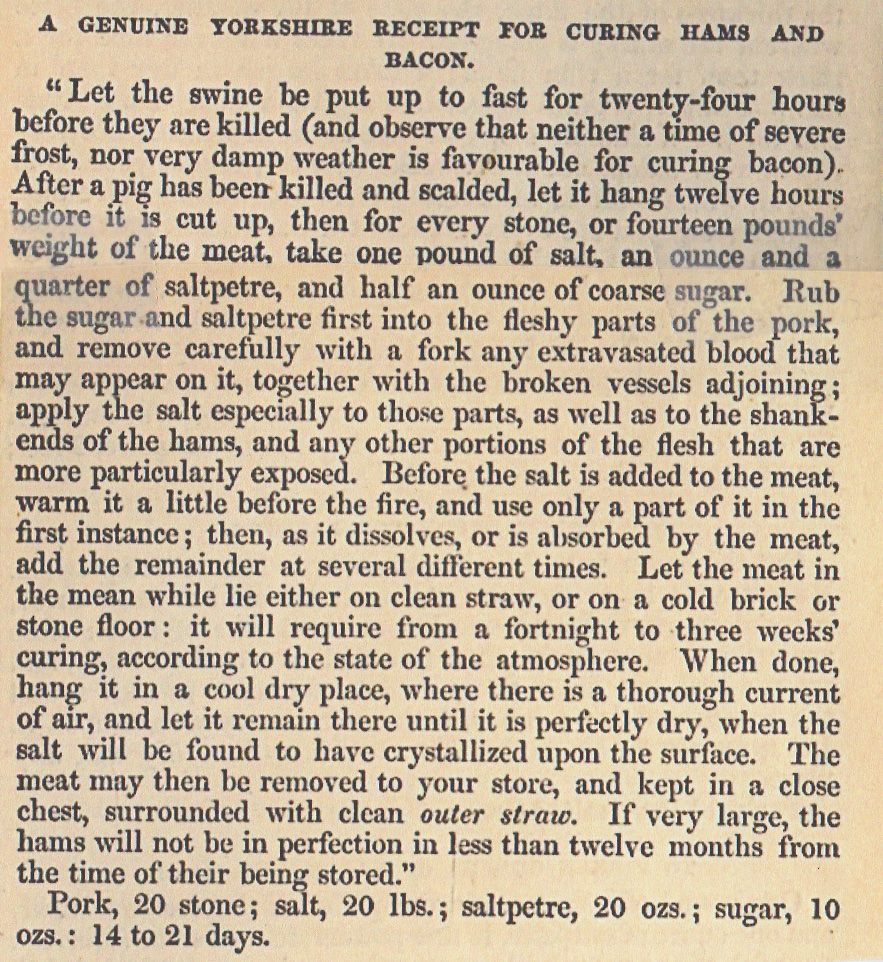
Eliza Acton's 'genuine Yorkshire receipt' for curing ham

Like Prosciutto and Westphalian ham, York hams are prepared by dry curing: the old-fashioned farmhouse method of rubbing dry salt to partly dehydrate the meat. According to The Larder Chef:

Cured, it is hung up to dry in cool cellars for up to 3-4 months. During this period a green mould grows on the ham, especially around the aitch bone and knuckle. This mould growth adds to the flavour and is easily washed off before cooking.

The green mould is probably a penicillium and inhibits the growth of bacteria and the risk of the fat going rancid; instead of which it is hydrolysed. Marsh & Baxter (not now a trading name), who were suppliers of hams by royal appointment, used to advertise that their York hams were dry-salted by hand for two months and then allowed to mature for three to four months to develop the unique flavour; this had been traditional for a century. The firm contrasted the modern brine-injection method:

Today when people buy boiled ham they are usually buying what the trade knows as cooked gammon, which is a gammon of Wiltshire cut bacon needing only three weeks to produce and mature for cooking.

For making York hams a similar slow dry curing and maturing process is used by the current (2022) Royal Warrant holders. They state that they use salt and saltpetre, but no added nitrite.

=== Smoking ===
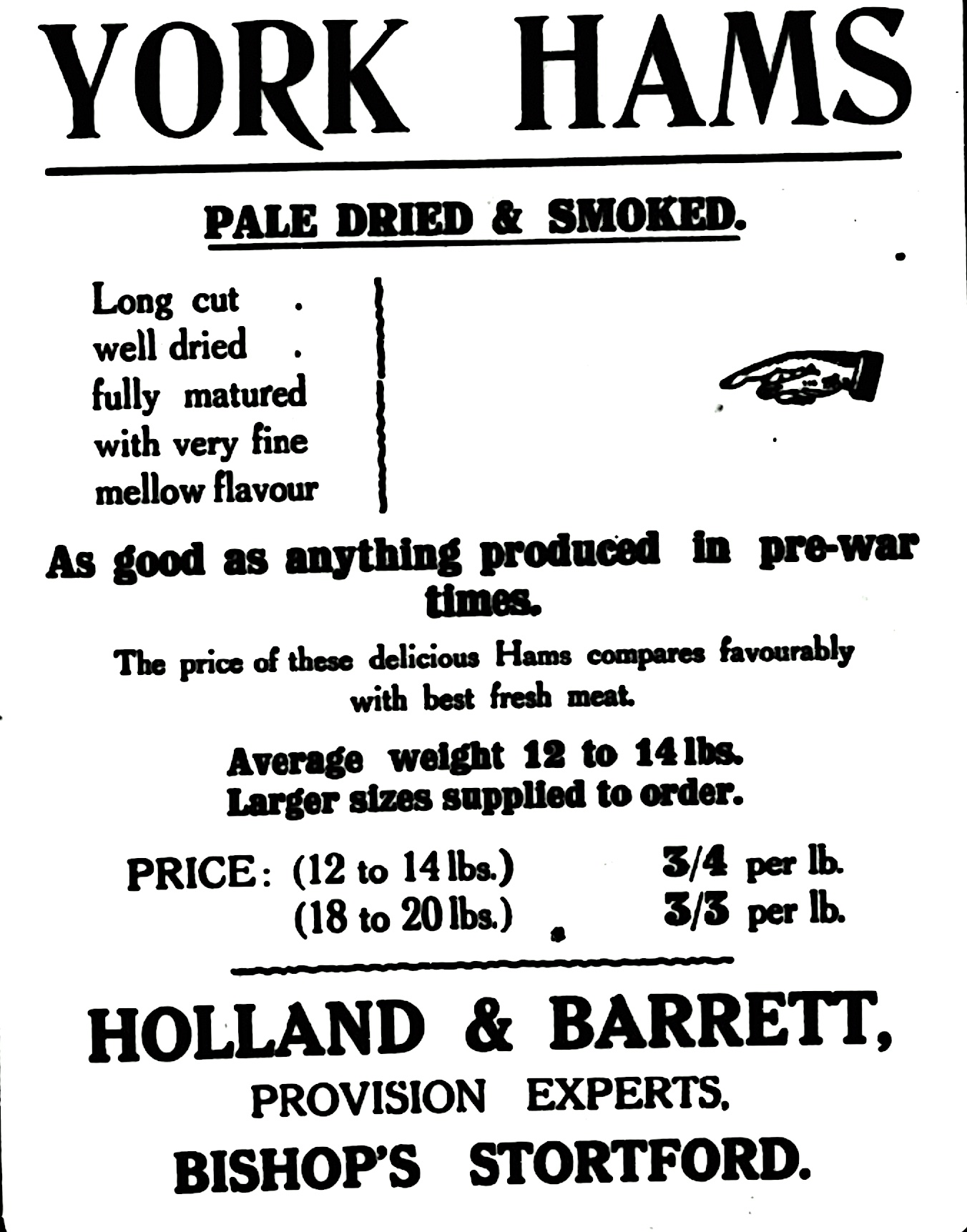
Both versions (pale dried, and smoked) advertised, 1921

Some authors say York ham is smoked, others that this claim derives from the romantic legend that the original York ham was smoked on wood shavings left over from the building of York Minster. The Larder Chef asserts it is not smoked, while the Oxford Companion to Food asserts that it is.

Probably the original York ham was made in both versions according to taste, like modern bacon. Eliza Acton (1847) had a detailed recipe where it was not smoked, while The Magazine of Domestic Economy (1839) said of York or Yorkshire hams:

They are smoked in smoking-houses, where great numbers are fumigated at the same time, with wood, shavings, and a few aromatic herbs, the fire being made to smoulder and yield plenty of smoke by means of wet straw placed on the top. In some very refined ham manufactories, a few juniper berries are added, which certainly enhance the flavour of the ham.

Thus the original Holland & Barrett (then a provision shop in Bishop's Stortford) advertised both versions. At a 1959 London tasting of French wines the importers paired them with six English hams: "York triple peat smoked, Wiltshire treacle-cured, Worcester and Suffolk sugar-cured, Devon dry-cured and York unsmoked". They said English cured hams would go with any wine.

=== Other characteristics ===
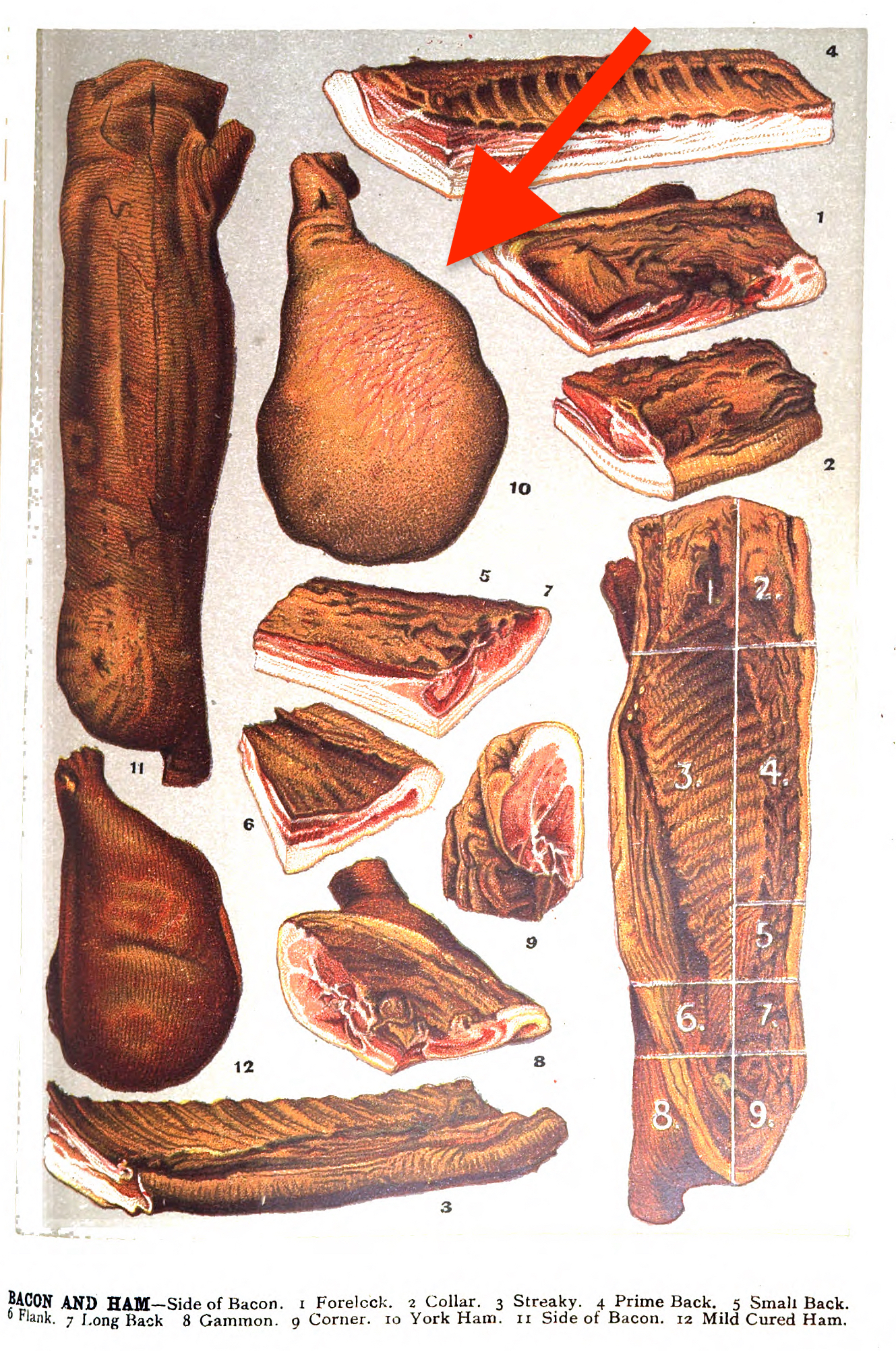
A York ham with its traditional long cut, banjo shape, Mrs. Beeton, 1907

In the Fell v. Army and Navy case an experienced buyer said "A York-fed ham is a plump, thick ham, well rounded off at the shoulders. The fat is very white, and the flavour unmistakable".

The Larder Chef says it is of a long cut and distinct banjo shape. The current (2022) Royal Warrant holder explains "long-cut""

Essentially this involves removing the leg from the rest of the pig by following the shape and seams of the muscle, rather than just cutting across the muscle. Were we to use the standard cut, there would be a large cut face that during the lengthy curing and maturing process would become unpalatably dry and tough."

== Cooking ==
Unlike Prosciutto or Westphalian hams, however, York ham is eaten cooked (boiled, with or without subsequent baking).

=== English gastronomy ===
Alfred Suzanne's La Cuisine Anglaise (1894), a book that commended English culinary specialities to French readers ("we are forced to recognise the merit of some of them"), said:

York ham enjoys a universal reputation... The manner usually employed by the English for cooking these is elementary. They simply boil in plenty of water without further seasoning, estimating that they have been sufficiently flavoured at the curing stage.

Before boiling it should be soaked in water to draw off excess salt. It should be wrapped in a cloth and simmered for three hours.

When you drain it, you remove the cloth that wraps it, and the ham is put in the pantry to be trimmed only on the next day, if it is to be eaten cold. But if it is to be eaten hot, remove the rind and put the ham back in a braiser with a bottle of sherry wine, then an hour before serving, put it in the oven. The wine in which the ham has been reheated, after it has been degreased and reduced, is mixed with the sauce which must accompany it on the table.

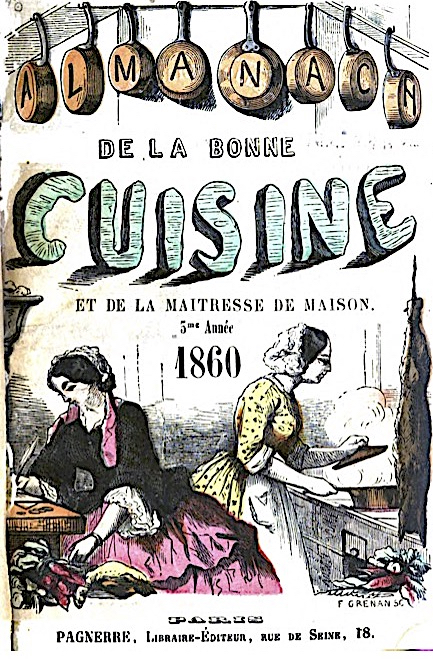
Almanach de la Bonne Cuisine

It was common, particularly in the Victorian era, to serve it hot with Madeira sauce; Escoffier gives a recipe.

=== French gastronomy ===
Some productions of French gastronomy were:

- Jambon d'York à la gelée [jellied York ham];
- Dindonneau à la Royale [minced turkey poults and York ham with truffled calf sweetbreads and crayfish];
- Sandwichs au jambon d'York au beurre d'Isigny [ham sandwich].

The illustration, a book of menus for aspiring French hostesses, had jambon d'York aux Petits Pois nouveaux.

== In literature ==
In John Galsworthy's A Modern Comedy, in a scene set in the 1880s, solicitor Soames Forsyte wins a case for his uncle Swithin:

Uncle Swithin had asked him to dinner afterwards and given him York ham with Madeira sauce, and his special Heidsieck. He had never given anybody anything else.

In Marcel Proust's novel In Search of Lost Time the stubborn Françoise gets it into her head that York ham is called New York ham, which she pronounces Nev'York. She would say to her kitchenmaid:

Go and fetch me a ham from Olida's. Madame told me especially to get a Nev'York.

Olida's was a real shop — also called Maison du Jambon d'York — founded in 1885, and near to where Proust lived in Paris.

== See also ==
- List of hams
- List of foods named after places

== Sources ==
- "A Brief History of English Ham". Dukeshill. 24 February 2020.
- A Correspondent (1839). "Bacon and Ham". The Magazine of Domestic Economy. IV (October). London: W. S. Orr.
- A Lady (1827). Domestic Economy, and Cookery, for Rich and Poor. London: Longman, Rees, Orme, Brown, and Green.
- Acton, Eliza (1847). Modern cookery, in all its branches : reduced to a system of easy practice, for the use of private families : in a series of receipts, which have been strictly tested, and are given with the most minute exactness (6th ed.). London: Longman, Brown, Green and Longmans.
- Almanach de la Bonne Cuisine et de la Maitresse de Maison (in French) (5me Année ed.). Paris: Pagnerre. 1860.
- Anthony, David J.; Lewis, E. Fordham (1961). Diseases of the Pig (fifth ed.). Baltimore: Williams and Wilkins.
- Beeton, Isabella (1861). The book of household management : comprising information for the mistress, housekeeper, cook, kitchen-maid, butler, footman, coachman, valet, upper and under house maids, lady's-maid, maid-of-all-work, laundry-maid, nurse and nurse-maid, monthly, wet, and sick nurses, etc. etc. : also, sanitary, medical, and legal memoranda : with a history of the origin, properties, and uses of all things connected with home life and comfort. London: S. O. Beeton.
- Beeton, Isabella (1888). The Book of Household Management. London and New York: Ward, Lock and Co.
- Bogart, D. (2013). "The Transportation Revolution in Industrializing Britain: A Survey". University of California-Irvine, Department of Economics Working Papers, (121306).
- Bregion, Joseph; Miller, Anne (1845). The Practical Cook, English and Foreign. London: Chapman and Hall.
- Burke, Helen (7 October 1959). "A ham-tasting, too". The Tatler & Bystander. p. 55.
- Callow, E. H. (1947). "The Action of Salts and other Substances Used in the Curing of Bacon and Ham". British Journal of Nutrition. 1 (2–3): 269–274. doi:10.1079/BJN19470037.
- Campion, Charles (24 May 2003). "The best legs in town". The Times. p. 4.
- Corisey, Régis, ed. (2021). "Jambon d'York". Gastronomiac: Encylopédie Gastronomique (in French).
- Davidson, Alan (2014). Jaine, Tom (ed.). The Oxford Companion to Food (3rd ed.). Oxford University Press. ISBN 978-0-19-967733-7.
- Douglas, Loudon M. (1898). "Bacon Curing". Journal of the Royal Agricultural Society of England. 9 (3rd Series): 68–108.
- Dubois, Urbain (1874). Cuisine Artistique: Études de L'École Moderne (in French). Vol. 2. Paris: Librairie E. Dente.
- Dyche, Thomas; Pardon, William (1740). A New General English Dictionary ... with the Addition of the Several Market Towns in England and Wales (3rd ed.). London: Richard Ware.
- Ellis, William (1750). The Country Housewife's Family Companion. London: James Hodges.
- Escoffier, Auguste (1979) [1921]. Le Guide Culinaire: The First Complete Translation Into English. Translated by H. L. Cracknell; R. J. Kaufmann. New York: Mayflower. ISBN 0-8317-5478-8.
- "Fell and Another v. Army and Navy Co-Operative Society. London". Leeds Mercury. 23 March 1877. p. 6.
- Francatelli, Charles Elmé (1861). The Cook's Guide and Housekeeper's and Butler's Assistant. London: Richard Bentley.
- Galsworthy, John (1929). The Silver Spoon. A Modern Comedy, Volume II. New York: Charles Scribner's Sons.
- Garlin, Gustave (1889). Le Cuisiner Moderne ou Les Secrets de L'Art Culinaire (in French). Vol. 1 (2nd ed.). Paris: Garnier Frères.
- Geddes-Brown, Leslie (10 October 2002). "Thought for Food". Country Life. p. 81.
- Glasse, Hannah (1796). The Art of Cookery Made Plain and Easy; Which far excels any Thing of the Kind yet published. London: Longman and others.
- Gordon, Maxine (5 December 2016). "Charting the history of York ham". The Press.
- Hall, Mr. and Mrs. S. C. (1843). A Week at Killarney. London: Jeremiah How.
- Hargrove, William (1818). History and Description of the Ancient City of York. Vol. 1. York: William Alexander.
- "Hooray for festive ham". Country Life. London: Future Publishing Ltd. 2008.
- Johnson, Mary (1770). Madam Johnson's Present: or, Every Young Woman's Companion in Useful and Universal Knowledge. Dublin: James Williams.
- Lewis, Samuel (1831). A Topographical Dictionary of England. Vol. IV. London: S. Lewis and Co.
- Leto, Mario Jack; Bode, Willi Karl Heinrich (2006). The Larder Chef: Food Preparation and Presentation (fourth ed.). Elsevier. ISBN 978-0-7506-6899-6.
- Long, James (1916). The Book of the Pig: Its Selection, Breeding, Feeding, and Management (3rd ed.). London: The Bazaar, Exchange and Mart Office.
- "March of the York ham to the Midlands". Birmingham Post. 19 December 1966. p. 5.
- Melvin, A. D. (1908). The Federal Meat-Inspection Service. Washington: U.S. Department of Agriculture.
- Nichols, James R.; Rolfe, W. J., eds. (1875). The Boston Journal of Chemistry. Vol. IX. Boston: Billings, Clapp and Company.
- Nicholson, Judy; Rainger, Chris (n.d.). "The River Ouse Through Time" (PDF). Fishergate, Fulford and Heslington Local History Society.
- Northern Living (2018). "The Origins of York Ham". Northern Living. Archived from the original on 26 May 2022.
- "Notes of the day". Westminster Gazette. 7 April 1897. p. 2.
- Olivers of the Mount (2008). "History of 57 & 59 Blossom Street". Archived from the original on 8 November 2008.
- Parkin, Michael (12 December 1966). "Awkward questions about York ham". The Guardian. p. 3.
- Pearce, Robert R. (1843). Ancient and Modern York ... Exhibiting a Statistical Survey of the City. York: John Linney.
- "Police". The Times. 7 April 1897. p. 4.
- Postlethwayt, Malachy (1766a). The Universal Dictionary of Trade and Commerce (PDF). Vol. I (3rd ed.). London: H. Woodfall.
- Postlethwayt, Malachy (1766b). The Universal Dictionary of Trade and Commerce (PDF). Vol. II (3rd ed.). London: H. Woodfall.
- Pressdee, Colin (15 June 2002). "Welsh ham's class act". The Times. p. 4(S).
- Proust, Marcel (2015). Carter, William C. (ed.). In the Shadow of Young Girls in Flower. In Search of Lost Time, Volume 2. Translated by Scott Moncrieff, C. K. New Haven and London: Yale University Press. ISBN 978-0-300-18542-3.
- Raffael, Michael (1993). "In Search of the Ideal Ham". Illustrated London News.
- Rousseau, Jean (1861). Paris Dansant (in French). Paris: Michel Lévy Freres.
- Rowlandson, Thomas (1850). "On the Breeding and Management of Pigs". Journal of the Royal Agricultural Society of England. XI (XXV): 574–607.
- Simmonds, W. H. (1907). Practical Grocer: A Manual and Guide for the Grocer, the Provision Merchant and Allied Trades. Vol. III. London: Gresham.
- "Spectator in Hallamshire". Sheffield Independent. 24 March 1877. p. 6.
- Stirk, Anne (n.d.). "Tease your tastebuds with York ham". BBC.
- Stobart, Tom (2016). Cook's Encyclopedia. London: Grub Street. ISBN 978-1-910690-09-3.
- Strœhlin, Ernest (1899). "Souvenirs d'Angleterre – York et Canterbury". Le Globe. Revue genevoise de géographie (in French). 38: 98–108. doi:10.3406/globe.1899.2141.
- Stubbs, William ("W. Cestr"), ed. (1888). The Great Roll of the Pipe for the Twelfth Year of the Reign of King Henry the Second, A.D. 1165–1166. Vol. IX. London: The Pipe Roll Society.
- Suzanne, Alfred (1894). La Cuisine Anglaise et la Patisserie. Paris.
- "The finest York ham in the world!". Illustrated London News. 2 November 1973. p. 8.
- "The grand banquet to Lord Stanley". Morning Herald. London. 3 April 1851. p. 5.
- "Three months to perfection". The Guardian. 20 October 1961. p. 26.
- Tillott, P. M., ed. (1961). "The eighteenth century: Economy and poor relief". A History of the County of York: the City of York. London: Victoria County History/British History Online. pp. 215–229.
- Webb, Andrew (2011). Food Britannia. Random House. ISBN 1-84794-623-2.
- "Welcome to the British Pig Association". British Big Association. n.d.
  - "Conservation". British Pig Association. n.d. Archived from the original on 10 May 2022.
  - "Large White". British Pig Association. n.d. Archived from the original on 17 May 2022.
  - "Large White buying guide". British Pig Association. n.d. Archived from the original on 17 May 2022.
- "What's In A Name On British Dishes". The Times. 28 December 1966. p. 9.
- Wilk, Richard (2008). "A taste of home: The cultural and economic significance of European food exports to the Colonies.". In Nützenadel, Alexander; Trentmann, Frank (eds.). Food and globalization: Consumption, markets and politics in the modern world (PDF). Oxford: Berg. ISBN 978-1-84520-679-6.
- Wilson, Carol; Trotter, Christopher (2011). The Whole Hog: recipes and lore for everything but the oink. Pavilion. ISBN 1-86205-861-X.
- "York n.1". OED Online. Oxford University Press. March 2022.
- "'York' ham". Food & Sanitation: the Public Analytical Journal. Vol. VIII, no. 230. 17 April 1897. pp. 186–7.
- Youatt, William; Sidney, Samuel (1860). The Pig. London and New York: Routledge, Warne & Routledge.
