= Florens-Louis Heidsieck =

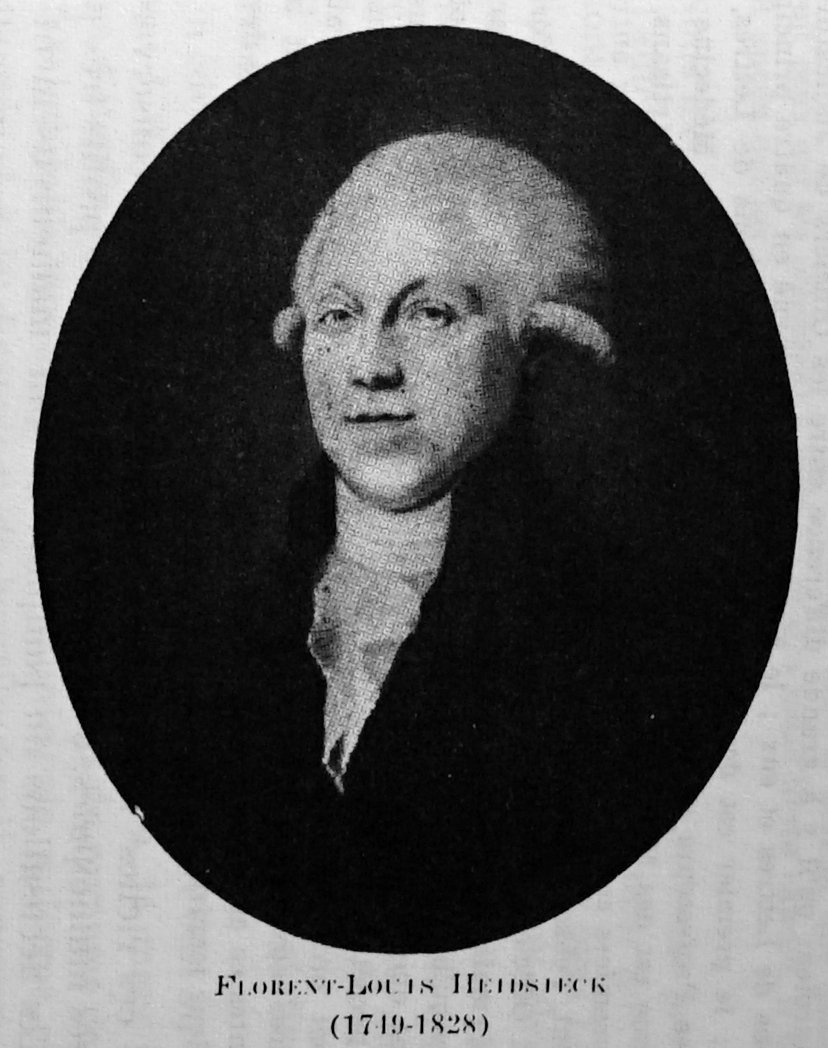
Florens-Louis

Florens-Louis Heidsieck (1749–1828) was the founder of the Champagne house Heidsieck & Co from which later Piper-Heidsieck was spun off, and which was the start of the Heidsieck Champagne clan. Heidsieck was the son of a Lutheran minister from Westphalia, and had moved to Reims to work as a cloth merchant. In Reims, he went into winemaking and started producing his own wine in 1780.

Florens-Louis Heidsieck founded his eponymously named Champagne house in 1785. He presented his champagne to Queen Marie Antoinette in 1788.

His nephew Christian Heidsieck joined the company in 1800. After his only son died, in 1814 Florens-Louis Heidsieck asked German great-nephews Frédéric-Auguste Delius, Charles-Henri Heidsieck, Henri-Louis Walbaum and Christian Heidsieck to work for the family business, followed by Henri-Guillaume Piper in 1815. Christian Heidsieck took over the control of Heidsieck & Co after Florens-Louis' death in 1828, while Piper handled sales.

== Current Heidsieck Champagne houses ==
- Heidsieck & Co Monopole is one of two direct descendant Champagne houses of the old Heidsieck & Co, founded in 1785. The "Monopole" part of the name was added in 1923. Today, Heidsieck is owned by Vranken-Pommery-Monopole (located in Reims), who also have Pommery, Charles Lafitte, and Demoiselle in their portfolio.
- Piper-Heidsieck is the other direct descendant Champagne house of the old Heidsieck & Co, founded in 1785. The Heidsieck name was combined with the Piper name in October 1839. Owned since 2011 by EPI from 1990, Piper-Heidsieck was part of the Rémy Cointreau wine and spirits group.
- Charles Heidsieck was founded in 1851 by Charles Camille Heidsieck, son of Charles-Henri Heidsieck, who was a nephew of Florens-Louis Heidsieck.
