= Barbara Erni =

Liechtenstein criminal (1743–1785)

Barbara Erni (15 February 1743 – 26 February 1785) was a Liechtenstein woman known for stealing from inns throughout western Europe using a confidence trick. Known in Liechtenstein legend as Golden Boos (German: Goldene Boos; boos being Dutch for 'wicked'), Erni was the last person to be executed by Liechtenstein.

Erni was born in Altenstadt, Feldkirch to a vagrant couple. In 1779, she married Franz Schindele (known as Tiroler Franz, Tyrolean Franz), a man with a reputation for criminal behaviour.

According to the legend, the Golden Boos was a woman with red-blond hair and great strength who travelled throughout the European countryside with a large treasure chest or backpack. Wherever she rested for the night, she would demand that her chest be locked in the best and most secure room available, since she claimed it contained a fabulous treasure. Once the treasure was locked away and night fell, a small man would emerge from the chest or backpack and would gather the valuables from the best room, after which Erni and the man would flee during the night. The scheme worked well for Erni for a number of years, and she became wealthy. The identity of the male assistant is unknown.

Erni and her male accomplice were arrested at Eschen and imprisoned at Vaduz on 27 May 1784. She was tried by Liechtenstein, and she admitted to seventeen thefts using the confidence trick. On 7 December 1784, licentiate Hensler recommended sentencing her to death. On 26 February 1785, she was beheaded at Güediga hill near Eschen before a public audience of several thousand spectators. She was the last person executed in Liechtenstein, which abolished the death penalty in 1989. The fate of the male assistant is unknown.
