= Bouchard Père et Fils =

Bouchard Père et Fils is a French wine grower, négociant and producer based in Beaune, in the Côte de Beaune wine-growing region of Burgundy, France.

The firm was established as a cloth merchant by Michel Bouchard in 1731, and in 1746 his son Joseph subsequently began selling wines and acquiring vineyards. The name Bouchard Père et Fils was officially adopted in 1785 with Antoine-Philibert-Joseph, son of Joseph. Currently the firm owns 130 hectares (320 acres) of vineyards across Burgundy, of which 12 hectares (30 acres) are of Grand Cru classification and 74ha rated as Premier Cru. In 1995 the Bouchard family sold the firm to Joseph Henriot.
