= Heidsieck & Co =

Champagne house in Champagne, France

- Wine region: Reims
- Appellation: Champagne (wine region)
- Known for: Cuvée Brut (non-vintage); Rare Vintage
- Varietals: Pinot Noir, Chardonnay, Pinot Meunier
- Website: http://www.heidsieckandco-monopole.com

Heidsieck & Co "Monopole" is a champagne house located in the Champagne region of France.

== History ==
The house was founded in 1785 by Florens-Louis Heidsieck. Following the death of the founder in 1828, the successors were his three nephews Henri-Louis Walbaum, Frédéric-Auguste Delius and Christian Heidsieck.

In 1838 after several disagreements, the nephews decide to part ways, and Christian Heidsieck went on to found the Piper-Heidsieck house. Henri Louis Walbaum (1813–1883) continued the business alone, joining forces with his brother-in-law Auguste Heidsieck (1796–1870), and the company name changed to "Walbaum Heidsieck & Co."

In 1860 Henri-Louis Walbaum and Auguste Heidsieck established the trademark "Monopole". Following the death of Auguste Heidsieck, in 1870 the company Veuve Heidsieck et Co., heirs to Heidsieck & Co., operated under the leadership of his widow for a few years. Her successor was Florens Walbaum, who became the first chairman of the Syndicat du Commerce des Vins de Champagne from 1882 until his death in 1893.

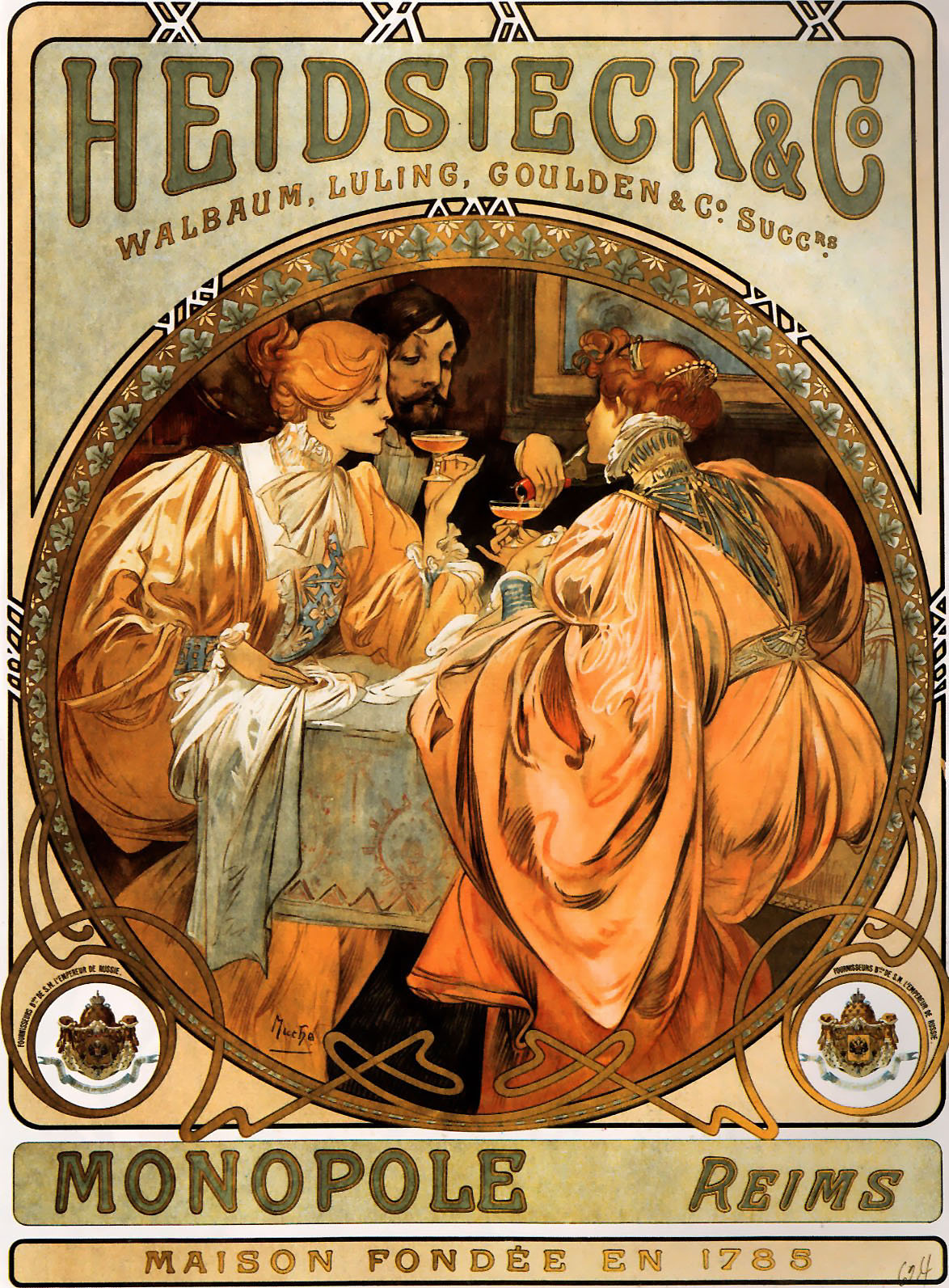
1901 advertisement for Heidsieck & Co Monopole by Alfons Mucha

The company name changed again to "Heidsieck & Co." in 1882. Following several other name changes, in 1889 the company became "Walbaum, Luling, Goulden & Co., successeurs d'Heidsieck & Co." in 1889. It received an imperial warrant of appointment to the Russian court. In 1907 the company name became “Walbaum Goulden & Co., successeurs d’Heidsieck & Co., Maison fondée en 1785″. The company received an imperial and royal warrant of appointment for the Austro-Hungarian court.

In 1923 Édouard Mignot, founder of the grocery store chain “Les Comptoirs Français” acquired the company, which then became "Champagne Heidsieck & Co Monopole SA".

After the Second World War, the Champagne Academy in London was founded in 1956 with "Heidsieck & Co Monopole" as one of the founding members.

In 1998, the Hiedsieck cuvée called Diamant bleu vintage 1907 was found in the shipwreck of the Swedish freighter Jönköping in the Gulf of Finland. The ship had been chartered to deliver spirits, via neutral Sweden, to the Imperial Court of Tsar Nicholas II of Russia. The ship was torpedoed in 1916 by a German submarine during World War I and the majority of the bottles survived in the frigid waters. About 2000 bottles were salvaged from the ship and have been sold at auctions all over the world as a historic novelty.

In July 2010, a group of Swedish divers found 168 bottles from the 1830s aboard a shipwreck in the Baltic Sea off the coast of Åland. The bottles were initially claimed to have been produced between 1782 and 1788. They were sent for analysis to France where they were traced to a now-defunct champagne house Juglar. In November 2010 it was reported that the wreck also included Veuve Clicquot bottles. Veuve Clicquot stated that experts checking branding of the corks "were able to identify with absolute certainty" that three of the bottles were theirs. The other bottles examined were attributed to Juglar.

In January 2011, further info about the Åland bottles was released: 95 of them were identified as Juglar, 46 as Veuve Clicquot and at least four as Heidsieck.

On 17 November 2011 the provincial government of the Åland Islands announced that most of the bottles were to be auctioned off. Two bottles of the Juglar were sold in the first auction, one going for 24,000 euros. Six bottles of the Juglar were sold at a second auction in 2012, along with four of the Veuve Clicquot and one of the Heidsieck. The profit from the auctions was used for the improvement of water quality in the Baltic Sea and for research in marine archaeology and naval history.

Today, Heidsieck is owned by the Vranken-Pommery Monopole Group (located in Reims), which also owns Pommery, Vranken, Château la Gordonne, Domaine Royal de Jarras, and Rozès. The champagne has a lot of pinot noir in the standard cuvée which makes it a little bit heavier in its style.

== Champagnes ==
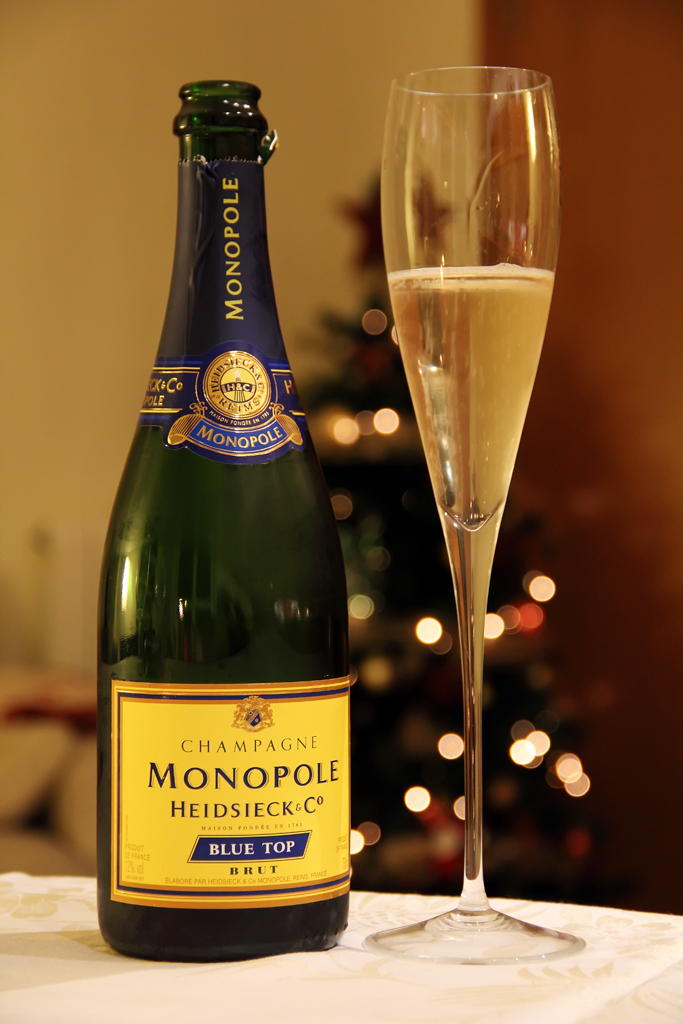
Bottle and glass of Heidsieck & Co. Monopole "Blue Top" Champagne.

- Blue Top (non-vintage) – The primary House champagne. (Composition: 70% Pinot Noir, 20% Chardonnay, 10% Pinot Meunier.)
- Blue Top Premiers Crus (non-vintage). (Composition: 60% Pinot Noir, 40% Chardonnay.)
- Extra Dry (non-vintage) (Composition: 70% Pinot Noir, 20% Chardonnay, 10% Pinot Meunier.)
- Gold Top Millesime 2000. (Composition: 35% Pinot Noir, 35% Chardonnay, 30% Pinot Meunier.)

== See also ==
- French wine
- Champagne Riots of 1911
- List of Champagne houses
