= Champagne Henriot =

Champagne producer in Reims, France

Coordinates: 49.2631736°N 4.0077646°E

Henriot (English: /ɒ̃ˈriːoʊ/, French: [ɑ̃ʁjo]) is a Champagne producer based in the Reims region of Champagne. The house, founded in Reims 1808 (218 years ago), produces both vintage and non-vintage cuvée. Henriot has been under family ownership since 1994 when Joseph Henriot left Veuve Clicquot to manage the estate. Henriot's cellar master Laurent Fresnet was named "Sparkling Winemaker of the Year" by the International Wine Challenge in 2015 and 2016.

The Henriot family also owns the producers Bouchard Père & Fils, William Fèvre and Château de Poncié in Burgundy and Chablis.

== History ==
- 16th century: The Henriot family settled in Champagne.
- 1794: Nicolas Simon Henriot, from a bourgeois local family who had been in the cloth business since the 16th century, married Apolline Godinot, niece of the Abbé Godinot, an eminent scholar whose work had contributed to advances in viticulture. This marriage sealed a fruitful family alliance which was to give birth to champagne Henriot.
- 1808: The House of Henriot was officially founded by Apolline Henriot, widow of Nicolas Simon Henriot. She undertook the task of making available the very private Champagne Henriot in her father's vineyard in Bouzy and sold her wines under the name Veuve Henriot Ainé.
- 1850: A supplier to the great courts. The House of Henriot received a royal Warrant from the King of Holland. This was continued in 1881 by his Highness Prince Fredrick of Holland.
- 1851: Ernest Henriot, grandson of Apolline Henriot, persuaded by his sister, Amélie Henriot, became associated with his brother in law, Charles Camille Heidsieck and created the brand Charles Heidsieck. Ernest continued to manage his own business in his own name.
- 1875: Ernest ended his partnership with Charles and devoted his time to the Henriot brand by creating Henriot et Cie.
- 1880: Paul Henriot, nephew of Ernest Henriot, married Marie Marguet. The House's vineyards were by now of considerable size, spread over the best crus of the Côte des Blancs, the Grande Vallée de la Marne and the Montagne de Reims.
- 22 August 1905: A Royal Warrant was granted to Alexandre Henriot by his Apostolic, Imperial, Royal Majesty, Franz Joseph I, Emperor of Austria and King of Hungary "for as long as he will conduct his business honestly and personally". This warrant authorized him to reproduce the supreme arms of the Habsburgs.
- Beginning of the 20th century: As everywhere in Europe, the Champagne vineyard was devastated by phylloxera.
- 1914–1918: Another disaster, the first world war destroyed Reims and the region.
- 1926: Etienne Henriot, son of Paul, who had trained as an agronomist, took over the management of the House. Very active in replanting and improving the vineyards of Champagne which were having difficulty recovering from the phylloxera crisis, he enlarged the House's estate through repeated purchases.
- 1930: Although the local economy was heavily affected by the crisis, Etienne Henriot succeeded in developing the House's business which he opened up to new export markets, until his premature death in 1957.
- 1957: Death of Etienne Henriot (1889–1957). His son, Joseph Henriot, also a trained agronomist, gradually took over the reins of the family company from 1962. Joseph will remain as head of the family business and subsequently President of Charles Heidsieck, another family jewel he sold to Rémy Martin in 1985, then Veuve Clicquot Ponsardin which he owned 11% of the shares in exchange for 125 hectares of vines. He leaves as administrator the Veuve Clicquot Ponsardin, property of the Louis Vuitton group since 1986, and continued to spread the renown of Champagne Henriot both in France and in export markets far and wide. He acquires several estates in the family holding, La Vigie Maisons and Domaines Henriot, in twenty years, in Burgundy with Bouchard Père et Fils in Beaune (1995; 130 ha of vines) William Fèvre in Chablis (1998), and in the Beaujolais Crus with Villa Ponciago in Fleurie (2008) former property of the Bouchard family (50 ha of vines), as well as the house Lejay Lagoute, "crème de cassis de Dijon", in 2004, then in the State of Oregon, Beaux Frères Property (2017; 50 ha of vines).
- 2015: Death of Joseph Henriot (1936–2015). His second son, Thomas gives way to the head of the family business, La Vigie Maisons and Domaines Henriot, to his cousin Gilles of Begon of La Rouziere de Montlosier, third son of Madeleine Henriot, Joseph's youngest sister.

== See also ==
- List of Champagne houses
