= Piper-Heidsieck =

French Champagne house

PIPER-HEIDSIECK
- Wine region: Reims
- Appellation: Champagne (wine region)
- Known for: Brut (non-vintage)
- Varietals: Pinot Noir, Chardonnay, Pinot Meunier
- Website: piper-heidsieck.com

Piper-Heidsieck is a Champagne house founded by Florens-Louis Heidsieck in 1785 in Reims, France. Piper-Heidsieck was acquired on July 8, 2011, by the French luxury group EPI (Entreprise Patrimoniale d’Investissements), controlled by the Descours family. Before that, the house was owned by the Rémy Cointreau wine and spirits group since 1988.

Marilyn Monroe was one of the House's supporters, rumoured to have kept a month's supply of champagne in her kitchen.

== History ==
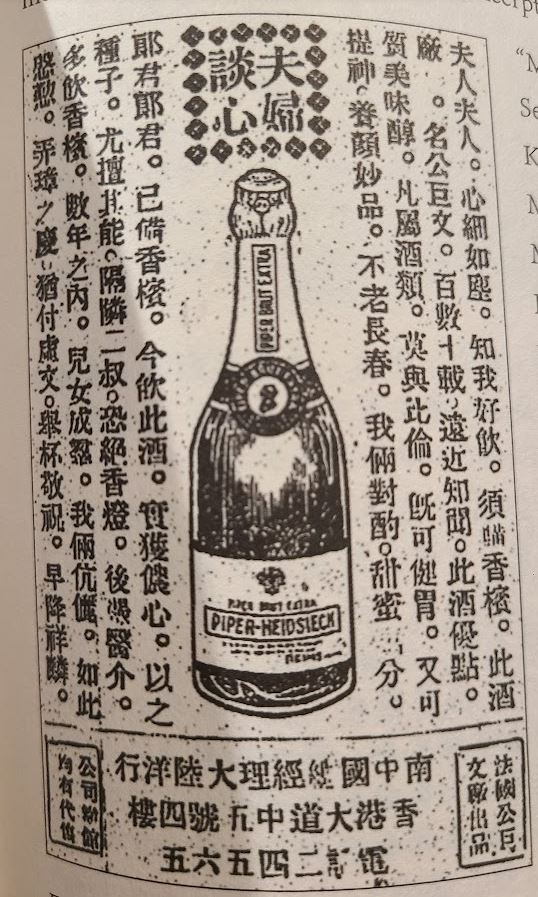
Piper-Heidsieck early 20th century Chinese advertisement from Hong Kong

The house was founded by Florens-Louis Heidsieck. Born in 1749, the son of a Protestant pastor from Westphalia, he settled as a draper in Reims, where he fell in love with a woman from Champagne and with Champagne wine. Self-taught, he was driven by a great ambition: "to create a cuvée worthy of a queen." In 1785, he founded the trading house of drapes and Champagne wines, Heidsieck & Cie. He became a master of his craft to the point of having the honor of personally presenting his wine to Queen Marie-Antoinette.

Upon Florens-Louis's death in 1828, his nephew Christian Heidsieck partnered with Henri-Guillaume Piper who used his good sense of commerce. From the Habsburg princes to the emperors of China, fourteen royal or imperial courts granted him the privilege of "patented supplier." Around the world, high society desired "the wine of Piper, crafted by Heidsieck." In 1835, Christian Heidsieck died, and in 1838, his wife remarried Henri-Guillaume Piper.

The name Piper-Heidsieck was born.

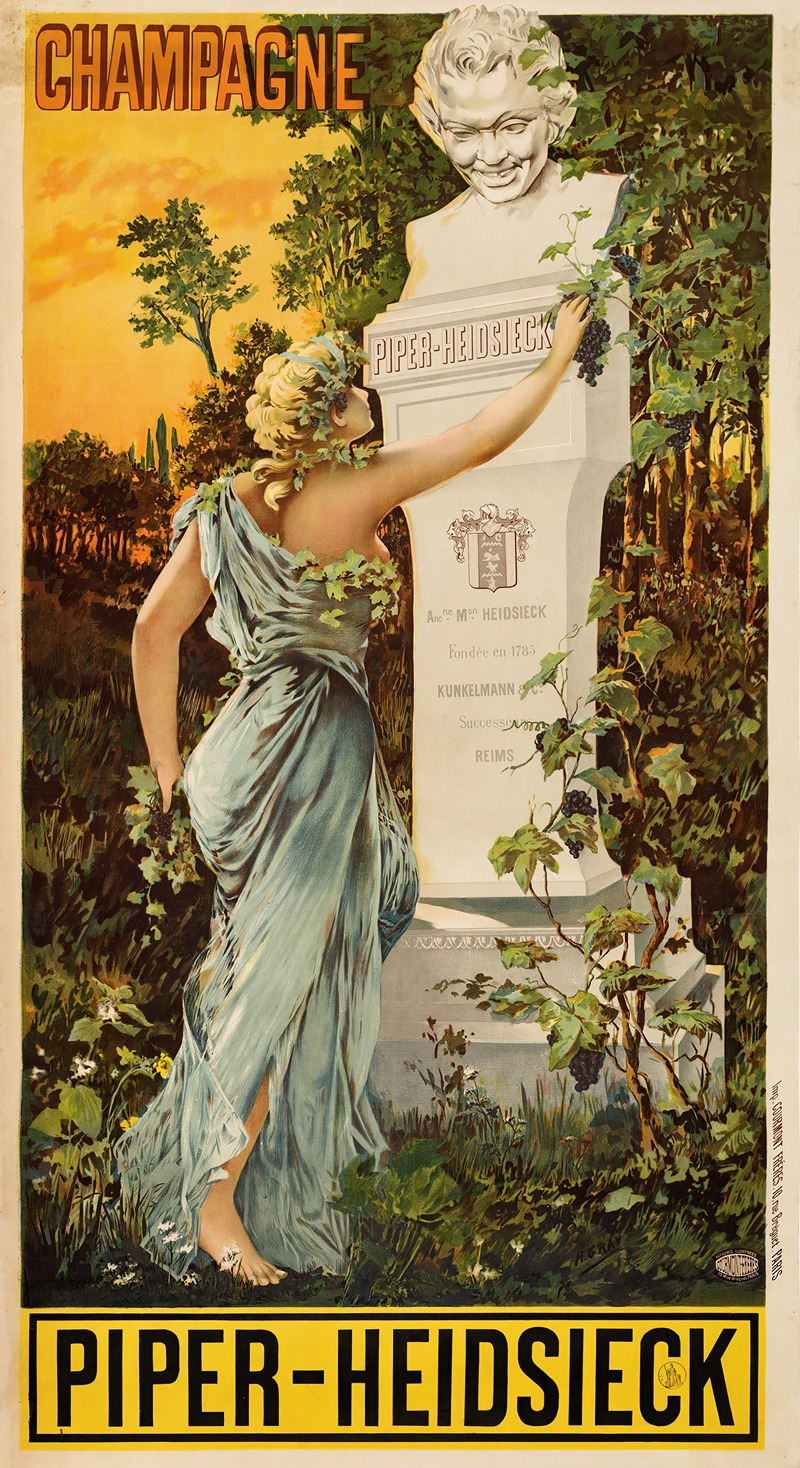
Champagne Piper-Heidsieck (1895)

Upon Henri-Guillaume's death in 1870, Jacques-Charles Théodore Kunkelmann, who had been a partner since 1851, took the reins of the house. In 1892, his son, Ferdinand-Théodore, succeeded him. His daughter Yolande married Marquis Jean de Suarez d’Aulan in 1926. A pioneer of aviation, this extraordinary man promoted the house by flying around the world in his own plane. During World War II, he accepted the task of hiding weapons in the cellar that would be used by the Champagne Resistance. The day before his arrest by the Gestapo, he fled to North Africa, became a fighter pilot in the famous Lafayette Escadrille, and died in combat in 1944. The Piper-Heidsieck house was placed under sequestration by the occupier and would likely have perished by the Liberation if it hadn't been brilliantly revived by Yolande Kunkelmann d'Aulan, supported by General Baron d’Alès, with whom she remarried in 1945.

François d’Aulan, the eldest son of Marquis Jean de Suarez d’Aulan and Yolande Kunkelmann, succeeded her in 1957. He presided over the Piper-Heidsieck Champagnes for thirty-three years, balancing development imperatives with family sustainability. In 1988, he passed the torch to the Hériard-Dubreuil family. The family holding EPI, specialized in the wine and luxury sectors and led by Christopher Descours, acquired the company in 2011.

As for the cellar masters, in 2002, Régis Camus took over the production of the wines of the Piper-Heidsieck house for 16 years, passing the reins to Emilien Boutillat in 2018, who became the youngest cellar master of a major Champagne house at the age of 31.

In July 2022, the house obtained B Corp certification.

== The House Champagnes ==
- Cuvée Brut
- Essentiel Extra Brut
- Essentiel Blanc de Blancs
- Essentiel Blanc de Noirs
- Cuvée Sublime
- Rosé Sauvage
- Vintage 2012 / 2014 / 2018
- Hors-Série 1971
- Hors-Série 1982

== History of the Buildings and Cellars ==
In 2008, architect Jacques Ferrier designed the new headquarters of the house in Reims. This establishment is distinguished by a metallic façade resembling a mesh, a signature of the architect inspired by Champagne bubbles.

The Piper-Heidsieck vineyard extends over more than 65 hectares, and the house sources grapes from 240 partner growers, spread across more than 110 crus. In 1995, the vat room was inaugurated with over 200 vats.

== In popular culture ==
In 1933, Piper-Heidsieck was the first Champagne house to appear on the big screen in the film "Sons of the desert" by Laurel and Hardy. This connection with cinema continued in 1953 when Marilyn Monroe expressed her affection for the brand in a press interview.

Since 1993, the Piper-Heidsieck house has maintained its relationship with cinema, serving as the official supplier of the Cannes Film Festival until 2020 and also of the Oscars from 2015 to 2020. The Piper-Heidsieck house maintains its relationship with cinema and has been a patron of the Cinémathèque Française since 2008. It has contributed to the funding of the restoration of Luis Buñuel's film "The Golden Age". Today, the house partners with new festivals that promote inclusion, such as the Independent Film Spirit Awards.

Piper-Heidsieck is the supplier for several sporting events and ceremonies worldwide, including the Australian Open since 2019 and the Ballon d'Or since 2021, the Miami Open since 2023 as well as the Rolex Paris Masters since 2021.

== Collaboration with Haute Couture ==
In 1999 and 2011, Jean-Paul Gaultier dressed Piper-Heidsieck bottles in a red corset and fishnet stockings for a limited edition. This collaboration continued with the avant-garde duo Viktor & Rolf in 2007, and in 2009 with designer Christian Louboutin.

- List of Champagne houses
