= Robert Fanshawe (Royal Navy officer) =

Royal Navy officer; (1740–1823)

Captain Robert Fanshawe
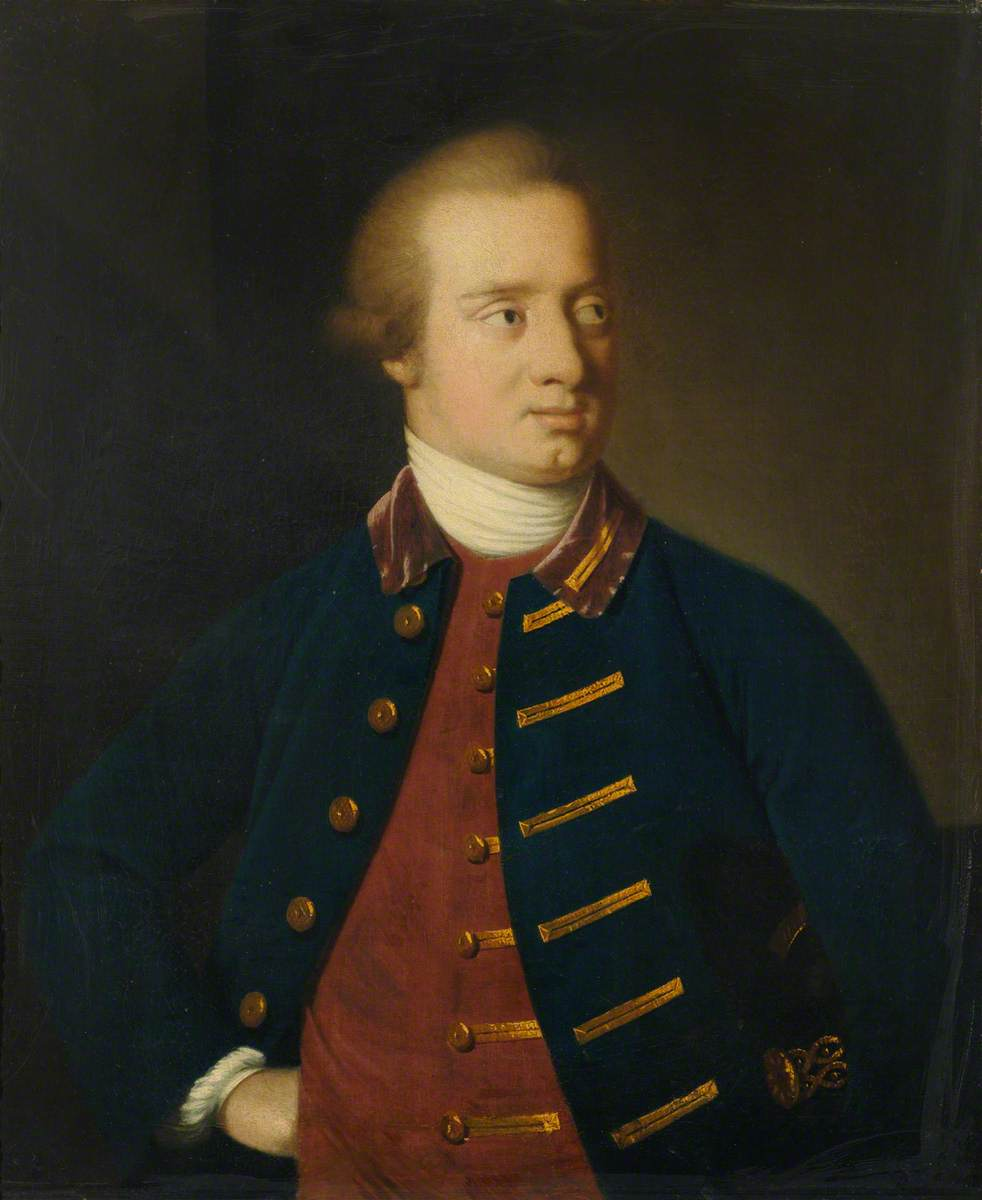
- Fanshawe, c. 1770
- Born: 4 January 1740; British America
- Died: 4 February 1823 (aged 83); Stonehall, Stonehouse, Plymouth, Devon
- Military career
- Allegiance: United Kingdom
- Branch: Royal Navy
- Rank: Post captain
- Commands: HMS Carcass; HMS Speedwell; HMS Lively; HMS Carysfort; HMS Monmouth; HMS Egmont; HMS Namur; HMS Bombay Castle
- Conflicts: Seven Years' War; Capture of Geriah; Recapture of Calcutta; Battle of Chandannagar; Battle of Cuddalore; Battle of Negapatam; Battle of Pondicherry; American Revolutionary War; Battle of Grenada; Battle of the Saintes

Robert Fanshawe (4 January 1740 – 4 February 1823) was a British officer of the Royal Navy and a Member of Parliament.

== Family and early life ==
Robert Fanshawe was born in British America on 4 January 1740, the second son of Rear-Admiral Charles Fanshawe and Elizabeth Rogers, daughter of Sir John Rogers, 2nd Baronet. Robert Fanshawe was a member of the Parsloes branch of the Fanshawe family, being a descendant of William Fanshawe, an M.P. that lived during the early 17th century. He joined the navy in 1753, serving as a midshipman aboard the 50-gun HMS Salisbury. He went to the East Indies during the Seven Years' War with the squadron commanded by Vice-Admiral Charles Watson. Fanshawe saw action at the capture of the fortress of Geriah, the recapture of Calcutta, and the Battle of Chandannagar in 1757. He also took part in the three general actions between Vice-Admiral George Pocock and Anne Antoine, Comte d'Aché, in 1758 and 1759; the battles of Cuddalore, Negapatam and Pondicherry.

Fanshawe was commissioned as a Lieutenant on 11 September 1759 and moved into the 60-gun HMS Tiger. The Tiger was later found to be unserviceable, and Fanshawe returned to Britain aboard a merchant-vessel. He was promoted to Master and Commander on 23 August 1762, and was appointed to command the bomb vessel HMS Carcass. From the Carcass he moved to take command of the sloop of war HMS Speedwell in June 1763, spending most of the next three years on the American station. Further promotion took place on 26 May 1768, with his advancement to Post-Captain. Fanshawe's first command at this rank was the frigate HMS Lively, which he held from April 1769 until autumn 1770. A period without a sea-going command followed, until he took command of the 28-gun HMS Carysfort in December 1775, during the American War of Independence.

== American War of Independence ==
Fanshawe returned to North American waters and joined the squadron there under Commodore William Hotham. Fanshawe was in action during the capture of New York in September 1776, and was later employed with the fleet under Lord Howe. He took command of the 64-gun HMS Monmouth in 1779, serving under John Byron at the Battle of Grenada on 6 July 1779 against the Comte d'Estaing. Monmouth was heavily engaged in the battle, opposing the French van in order to prevent the capture of several British transports. Her total casualties from the battle amounted to 25 men killed and 28 wounded.

Fanshawe's next command, early in 1780, was the 74-gun HMS Egmont. Egmont was caught in the Great Hurricane of 1780, which caused significant destruction to islands and shipping in the West Indies. Fanshawe's ship survived, albeit with the loss of all her masts. Detailed to escort a fleet back to Britain in 1781, Fanshawe received intelligence of the combined fleets of France and Spain, amounting to forty-nine sail of the line, being at sea in the hope of intercepting his convoy. Fanshawe took them north out of range of the enemy, bringing them to port safely. For this he received the thanks of the Admiralty, and was presented with the freedom of Edinburgh. Egmont was paid off soon after her arrival, leaving Fanshawe briefly unemployed. He was at Plymouth as Sir George Brydges Rodney's fleet was preparing to sail. The command of the 90-gun HMS Namur suddenly fell vacant, and Fanshawe was quickly nominated to fill it. He went on to distinguish himself at the Battle of the Saintes on 12 April 1782. Fanshawe remained in command of Namur until the end of the war in 1783, and was appointed to command the 74-gun HMS Bombay Castle, the Plymouth guard ship, in 1785.

== Parliamentary career ==
From 1784 to January 1790 Fanshawe sat as Member of Parliament for Plymouth as a supporter of William Pitt, the Younger. His only known votes were with Pitt on the Regency and stood down to become Commissioner of Plymouth Dockyard. As Commissioner of Plymouth Dockyard he was responsible for the management of the whole dock and the building of ships for the Royal Navy. He served as Commissioner from 1790 until 1815.

== Later life and family ==
Captain Robert Fanshawe died at Stonehall, Stonehouse, Plymouth, Devon on 4 February 1823; at which period, had he accepted his flag, he would have been the senior Admiral of the Red. He was buried at St George's Church, Devon. On 5 December 1769 Fanshawe had married Christiana Gennys, daughter of John Gennys of Whitleigh Hall, Saint Budeaux, Devon. They had three sons and nine daughters together. His eldest son, also named Robert, followed his father into the navy, rising to the rank of captain. He died at Antigua in 1804 while in command of HMS Carysfort, the ship his father had commanded 30 years earlier. His second son, Edward, served as an officer in the Royal Engineers, while his third son, Arthur, rose to flag rank, as did Robert's grandson, Edward. Of his daughters; Christiana married the Rev. Francis Haggitt, Prebendary and Sub-Dean of Durham; Elizabeth married F. Glanville, Esq.; Susan married Vice-Admiral William Bedford; Catharine married to Sir Thomas Byam Martin; Cordelia married Captain, later Vice-Admiral, John Chambers White; Mary married Vice-Admiral the Hon. Sir Robert Stopford, and Penelope married Colonel Duckworth, who died at Battle of Albuera on 16 May 1811. Two other daughters, Anne and Harriet, were recorded as being unmarried at the time that Fanshawe's biography was published.

Parliament of Great Britain
Preceded by Sir Frederick Leman Rogers; George Darby	Member of Parliament for Plymouth; 1784–1790; With: John MacBride	Succeeded by John MacBride; Alan Gardner
