= Saint Louis (1752 ship) =

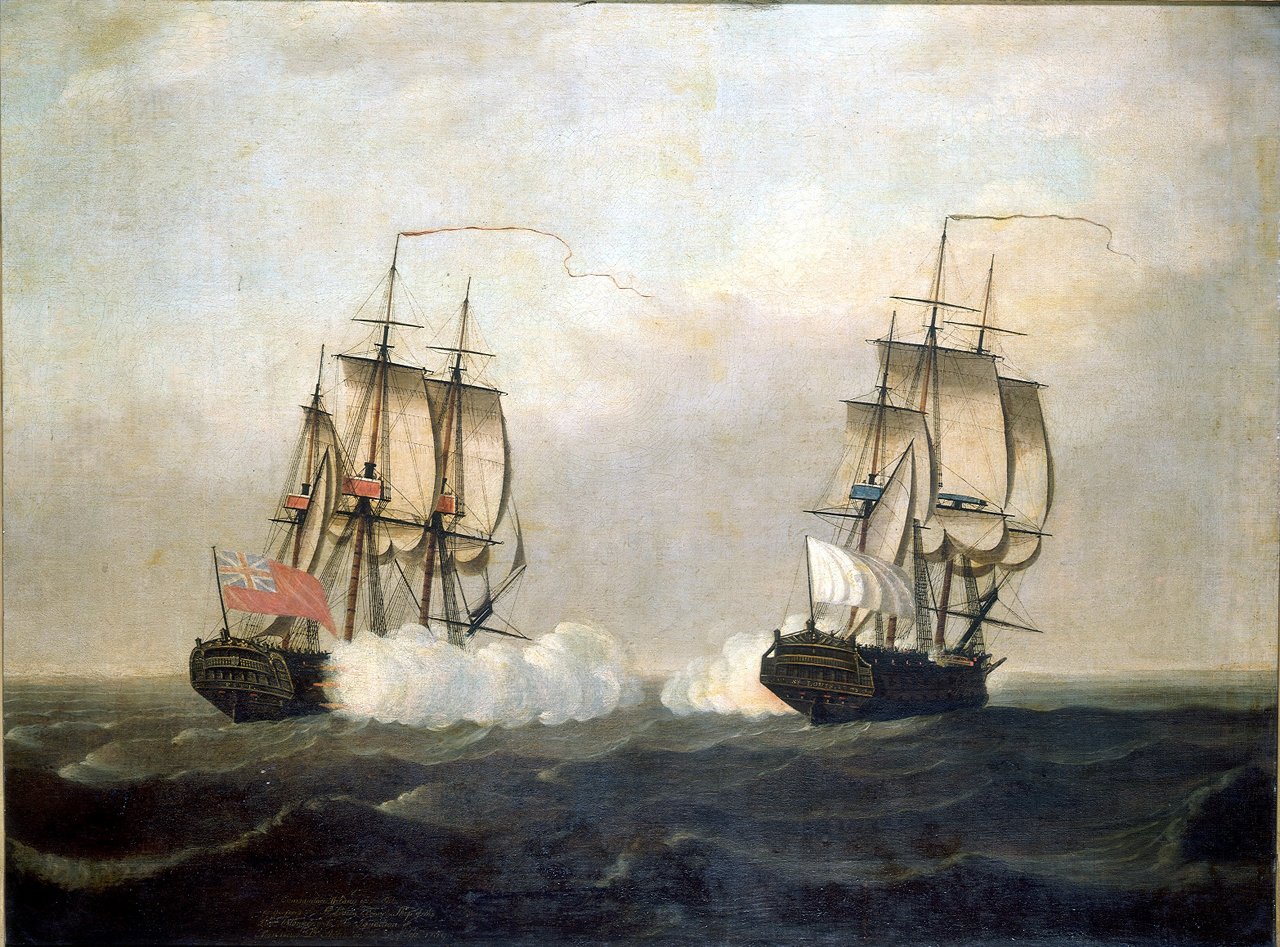
- Pitt engaging Saint Louis (right) on 29 September 1758

History

France
- Name: Saint Louis
- Namesake: Louis IX of France
- Builder: Lorient, plans by Nicolas Lévèque
- Laid down: July 1751
- Launched: 27 July 1752
- Commissioned: January 1753
- Fate: Hulked in June 1768; sold to the French Royal Navy in April 1779

General characteristics
- Type: East Indiaman
- Displacement: 2100 tons (French)
- Tons burthen: 1100 (French; "of load")
- Length: 145 French feet (keel 130 French feet) (Note: All linear measurements are in French feet, which differ from English feet.)
- Beam: 40 French feet
- Draught: 17 French feet
- Propulsion: Sail
- Complement: 10 to 11 officers; 189 (peace) to 243 (war) men
- Armament: 12 to 26 × 12-pounder long guns or 18-pounder long guns; Pierced for 54 guns

Saint Louis was a French East Indiaman, launched on 27 July 1752. She served in the Indian Ocean where she participated in three battles and at least one single-ship action. In 1768, she became a careening hulk in Lorient.

== Career ==
In February 1753, Saint-Louis departed Lorient, bound for the Indian Ocean. She called in at Gorée and Île de France (now Mauritius) before arriving in Pondicherry. She returned via Île de France, Bourbon (now Réunion), and Martinique, returning to Lorient in January 1755.

With the Seven Years' War underway, she was prepared for a new voyage in March 1756, but remained in Lorient harbour, ready to depart, until June. She eventually sailed in December with a 253-man complement and full armament (26 heavy guns out of a total of 54 guns), under Captain Louis de Joannis, to reinforce Aché's Indian Ocean squadron.

On 29 April 1758, she took part in the Battle of Cuddalore, engaging HMS Yarmouth and HMS Cumberland. At the battle of Negapatam, her first officer, Langery, had his head shot away by a cannonball.

Next, she took part in the battle of Pondicherry on 10 September, engaging HMS Newcastle, HMS Tiger and HMS Grafton. On 29 September 1758, she had an inconclusive engagement with the British East Indiaman Pitt, before returning to France in December 1760.

She cruised again from January 1761 to March 1763. In January 1764 she departed Lorient, armed with 12 guns, bound for Île de France. She returned to Lorient in July 1764.

In September 1766, she departed Lorient with a 211-man complement and 14 guns, sailed to the Indian Ocean, and returned to Lorient in May 1768, but ran aground in the harbour on 31 May. This led to her decommissioning and use as a careening hulk. The French East India Company was dissolved in 1769, and in April 1770 the French Royal Navy purchased Saint Louis.

== Fate ==
Saint Louis was eventually broken up in 1783.

== Notes, citations & references ==
=== References ===
- Demerliac, Alain (2004). La Marine de Louis XV: Nomenclature des Navires Français de 1715 A 1774 (in French). Éditions Ancre. ISBN 2-906381-19-5.
- Roche, Jean-Michel (2005). Dictionnaire des bâtiments de la flotte de guerre française de Colbert à nos jours. Vol. 1. Group Retozel-Maury Millau. ISBN 978-2-9525917-0-6. OCLC 165892922. (1671–1870)
- Winfield, Rif (2007). British Warships in the Age of Sail 1714–17927: Design, Construction, Careers and Fates. Seaforth. ISBN 978-1844157006.
