= Peter Rainier (Royal Navy officer, born 1741) =

Royal Navy officer and politician (1741–1808)

Admiral Peter Rainier
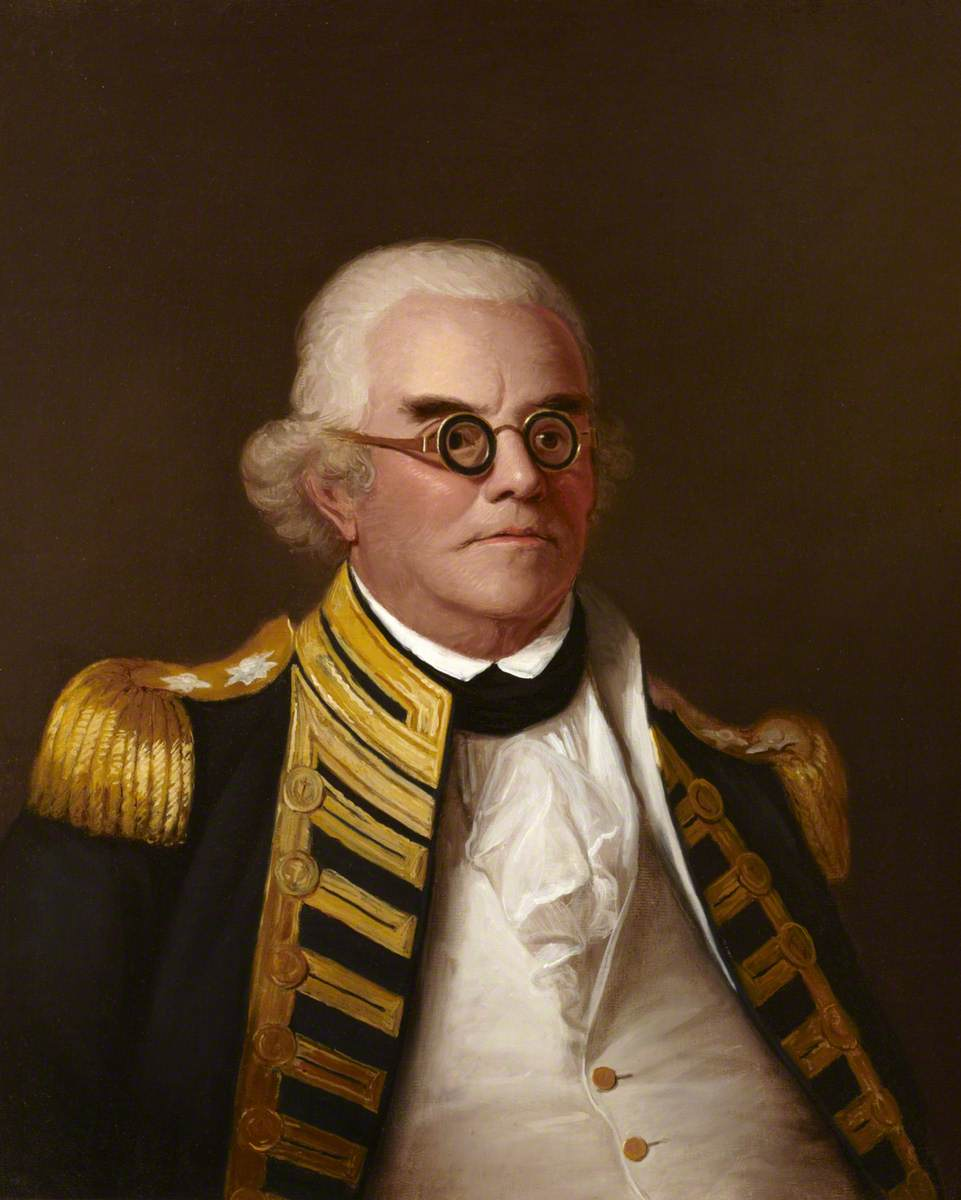
- Portrait by Thomas Hickey, c. 1800–1804
- Born: 24 November 1741; Sandwich, Kent
- Died: 7 April 1808 (aged 66); Westminster, London
- Military career
- Allegiance: Great Britain; United Kingdom
- Branch: Royal Navy
- Service years: 1756–1805
- Rank: Admiral of the Blue
- Commands: HMS Burford; HMS Monarch; HMS Suffolk
- Conflicts: Seven Years' War; Battle of Cuddalore; Battle of Negapatam; Siege of Pondicherry; Battle of Manila; American War of Independence; French Revolutionary Wars; Napoleonic Wars

Admiral of the Blue Peter Rainier (24 November 1741 – 7 April 1808) was a Royal Navy officer who served in the Seven Years' War, American War of Independence and the French Revolutionary and Napoleonic Wars. From 1794 to 1805, Rainier was commander-in-chief of the East Indies Station, covering all seas between the Cape of Good Hope and the South China Sea. Mount Rainier in the American state of Washington was named after him by George Vancouver.

== Early life and naval career ==
Rainier was born in Sandwich, Kent, on 24 November 1741. He was the grandson of Daniel Regnier, a Huguenot refugee who had fled France following the revocation of the Edict of Nantes, and the son of merchant Peter Rainier and his wife Sarah née Spratt. Rainier was educated at Tonbridge from 1754, before joining the Royal Navy in 1756.

Rainier initially served on the 50-gun fourth rate HMS Oxford, but when she was broken up in 1758 he transferred to the 64-gun ship of the line HMS Yarmouth. In that ship he sailed to the East Indies Station, arriving in March, at which point Rainier moved from Yarmouth into the 60-gun fourth rate HMS Tiger, also on the station. In Tiger he fought at the Battle of Cuddalore on 29 April, the Battle of Negapatam on 3 August, and in another engagement off the Coromandel Coast on 10 September 1759. In June 1760, he transferred to serve aboard the 64-gun ship of the line HMS Norfolk, which was the flagship of Rear-admiral Charles Steevens. In Norfolk Rainier served at the Siege of Pondicherry between September 1760 and January 1761. In April of the latter year Steevens died and was replaced on board by Vice-admiral Samuel Cornish, under whom Rainier fought at the Battle of Manila between September and October 1762. Rainier returned home from the East Indies in Norfolk in 1764, at which point the ship was paid off.

After this, Rainier was not immediately employed by the navy again, and it is possible that he instead went to sea with the East India Company. Despite this, he passed his examination for the rank of lieutenant on 26 May 1768. In January 1774, he was appointed as such to serve on the 28-gun frigate HMS Maidstone, serving in the West Indies. The commander in chief there, Vice-admiral Clark Gayton, promoted Rainier to commander on 3 May 1777, giving him command of the 14-gun sloop HMS Ostrich. On 8 July of the following year, Rainier engaged and captured a large American privateer, and was badly wounded in the battle. In reward for this action, Rainier was promoted to post-captain on 29 October. He received his next command, that of the 64-gun ship of the line HMS Burford, in January 1779.

In Burford Rainier joined the fleet of Vice-admiral Sir Edward Hughes that sailed for the East Indies Station on 7 March of the same year. In 1790, he became the commander of HMS Monarch. On 8 May 1792, George Vancouver named Mount Rainier in modern-day Washington after Captain Rainier: "The weather was serene and pleasant, and the country continued to exhibit between us and the eastern snowy range the same luxuriant appearance. At is northern extremity, Mount Baker bore by compass N. 22E.; the round snowy mountain, now forming its southern extremity, and which, after my friend, Rear Admiral Rainier, I distinguish by the name of Mount Rainier, bore N(S) 42 E."

In early 1793, Rainier commissioned the 74-gun Suffolk. From 1794 to 1805, Rainier commanded Royal Navy operations on the East Indies Station. During his tenure, large swaths of territory came under British control. In 1795, Rainier was promoted to rear admiral. Four years later, he was promoted to the rank of vice admiral. He served in the East Indies as commodore and commander-in-chief of a fleet. In 1800, he commanded an expedition to Java. On 23 August 1800, Sybille, Daedalus, Centurion, and Braave entered Batavia Roads and captured five Dutch armed vessels in all and destroyed 22 other vessels. The British took one vessel into service and Captain Henry Lidgbird Ball of Daedalus named her Admiral Rainier, and ordered her manned, armed, and equipped. Admiral Rainier was sold in September 1803. In 1805, Rainier returned to England and retired from active duty.

== Later life ==
After Rainier's retirement, the ministry continued to consult him. In 1805, he was promoted to Admiral of the Blue in the celebratory promotions following the British victory at the Battle of Trafalgar. In 1807, he became a Member of Parliament for Sandwich. He died the following year at his home on Great George Street, Westminster, with his nephew, John Spratt Rainier, succeeding him as MP for Sandwich.

Rainier left an estate valued at £250,000, largely prize money gained during his naval career. He was not married, and although the bulk of his estate was divided between his nephews, John and Peter Rainier, ten percent was left to the Chancellor of the Exchequer to be used to reduce the national debt, in acknowledgement of: "the national establishment of the Royal Navy, in which I have acquired the principal part of the fortune I now have, which has exceeded my merit and pretensions."

In 1898 botanist Edward Lee Greene published Rainiera which is a genus of flowering plants in the daisy family, Asteraceae from northwestern United States. Greene named the genus after Mount Rainier, where it had been found.

== Citations ==
Parliament of the United Kingdom
Preceded by Thomas Fremantle; Sir Horatio Mann	Member of Parliament for Sandwich; 1807–1808; With: Charles Jenkinson	Succeeded by John Spratt Rainier; Charles Jenkinson
Military offices
Preceded by William Cornwallis	Commander-in-Chief, East Indies Station; 1794–1805	Succeeded by Sir Edward Pellew
