= Puducherry =

Puducherry or Pondicherry may refer to:

== Places in India ==
- Puducherry (union territory), formerly known as Pondicherry
  - Puducherry (city), capital of the union territory of Puducherry
  - Puducherry district, formerly Pondicherry district
    - Puducherry taluk
  - Puducherry Lok Sabha constituency, parliament constituency

== Other uses ==
- Pondicherry (film), 2022 Indian Marathi-language film
- Pondicherry shark, fish
- Pondicherry University, in Kalapet, India
- Puducherry Technological University, in Pondicherry, India
- Pondicherry football team, representing Puducherry in Indian state football competitions
- Bridgton, Maine, U.S., first called Pondicherry
- Pondichéry (1754 ship)

== See also ==
- Battle of Pondicherry, 1759
- Siege of Pondicherry (disambiguation)
- Pondi (disambiguation)
- Pudu (disambiguation)
- Pondichéry, dernier comptoir des Indes, a 1997 French film
- Sitana ponticeriana, the Pondichéry fan-throated lizard
