= Battle of Cuddalore (1758) =

1758 battle of the Seven Years' War

Coordinates: 11.7500°N 79.7500°E

- Part of the Seven Years' War
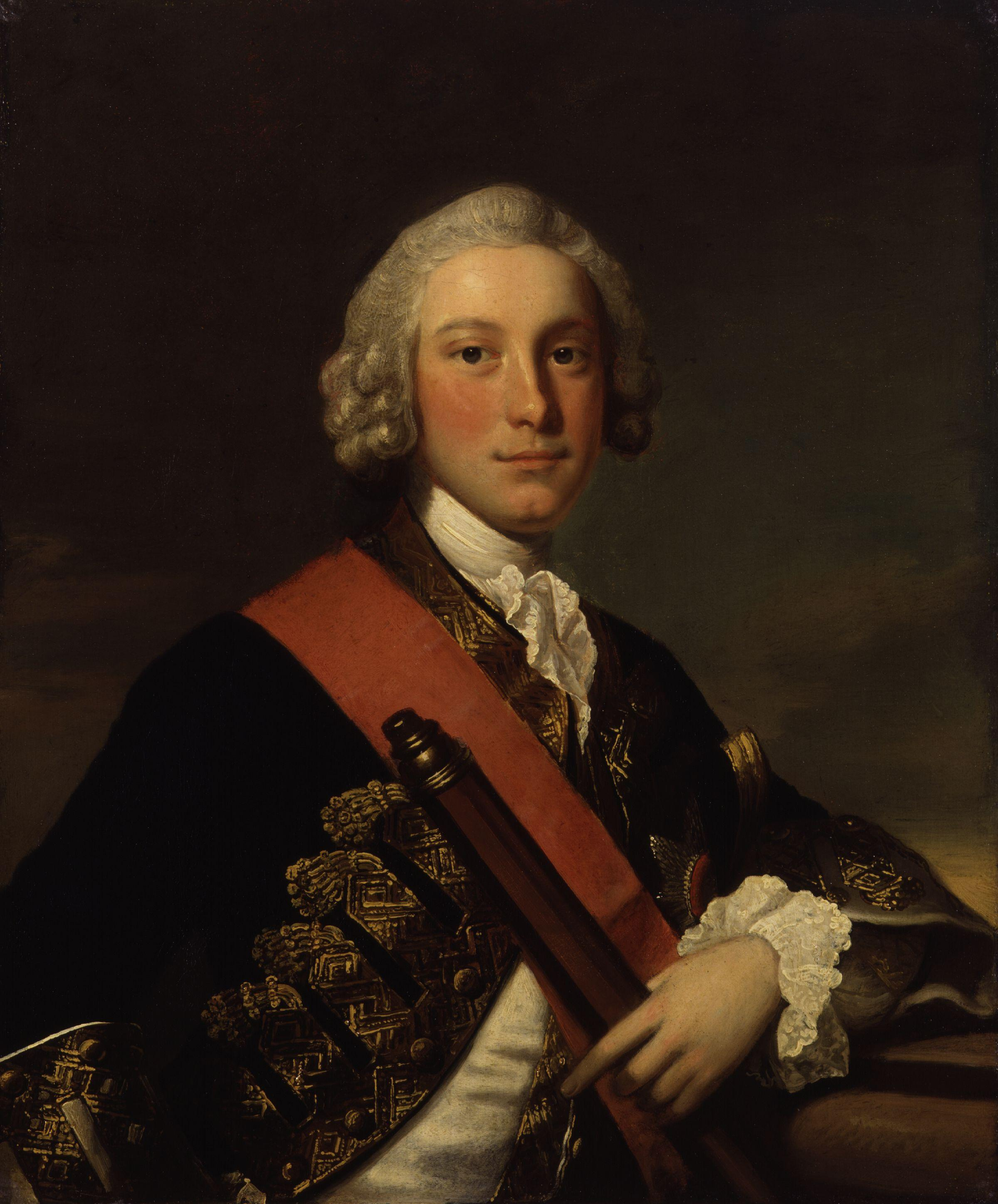
- A portrait of George Pocock
Date	29 April 1758
Location	Off Cuddalore, Indian Ocean
Result	Inconclusive

Belligerents
Great Britain	France; French Indies Company

Commanders and leaders
George Pocock	Comte d'Aché

Strength
7 ships of the line 1 frigate 1 storeship	6 ships of the line (Note: The 36-gun frigate Sylphide was added to the French line of battle despite not being a ship of the line.); 4 frigates 1 merchantman

Casualties and losses
29 killed 89 wounded	99 killed 321 wounded

The Battle of Cuddalore took place on 29 April 1758 during the Seven Years' War near Cuddalore off the Carnatic coast of India, and was an indecisive battle between a British squadron under Vice-Admiral George Pocock and French squadron under Anne Antoine, Comte d'Aché. The British casualties were 29 killed and 89 wounded, while France lost 99 killed and 321 wounded. Although the battle itself was indecisive, the French fleet was able to achieve its primary objective of delivering the reinforcements that the defenders of Pondicherry were awaiting.

The two squadrons met again on 3 August in the Battle of Negapatam in 1758, and again on 10 September 1759 in the Battle of Pondicherry.

== Ships involved ==
=== Britain (George Pocock) ===
Ships	Guns	Commander	Notes	Ref.
Tiger	60	Captain Thomas Latham		
Salisbury	50	Captain John Stukley Somerset		
Elizabeth	64	Commodore Charles Steevens; Captain Richard Kempenfelt		
Yarmouth	64	Vice-Admiral George Pocock; Captain John Harrison		
Cumberland	56	Captain William Brereton		
Newcastle	50	Captain George Legge		
Weymouth	60	Captain Nicholas Vincent		
Queenborough	24	Captain James Colville	Not in line of battle	
Protector	–		Not in line of battle; storeship	

=== France (d'Aché) ===
Ship	Guns	Commander	Notes	Ref.
Bien-Aimé	58	Captain Jean Baptiste Christy de La Pallière	Wrecked 30 April	
Vengeur	64	Captain René Joseph Bouvet de Précourt		
Condé	44	Captain François-Jacques Kerlero de Rosbo		
Duc d'Orléans	56	Captain Jean-François de Surville		
Zodiaque	74	Chef d'Escadre Anne Antoine, Comte d'Aché; Captain Jacques-Antoine de Gotho		
Saint-Louis	50	Captain Louis de Joannis		
Moras	44	Captain Louis-Toussaint de Becdelièvre-du Bouéxic		
Sylphide	36	Captain Étienne Mahé		
Duc de Bourgogne	80	Captain Jean-Baptiste d’Aprèt de Mannevillette		
Comte de Provence	74	Captain Jean-Jacques de La Chaise	Not in line of battle	
Diligente	24	Captain Marc-Joseph Marion du Fresne	Not in line of battle	

== See also ==
- Great Britain in the Seven Years War
- France in the Seven Years War
