= List of ship launches in 1752 =

This is a chronological list of all ships launched in 1752.

Date	Ship	Class	Builder	Location	Country	Notes
24 January	Ziver-i Bahri	Second rate		Constantinople	Ottoman Empire	For Ottoman Navy.
18 February	Weymouth	Fourth rate	Plymouth Dockyard	Plymouth	Great Britain	For Royal Navy
14 March	Oranjewoud	Sixth rate	L van Zwijndrecht	Rotterdam	Dutch Republic	For Dutch Navy.
14 March	Oranjezaal	Sixth rate	L van Zwijndrecht	Rotterdam	Dutch Republic	For Dutch Navy.
9 April	Fly	Fly-class sloop	Pierson Lock	Portsmouth Dockyard	Great Britain	For Royal Navy.
23 April	Speranza	Speranza-class ship of the line	Marco Nobile	Venice	Republic of Venice	For Venetian Navy.
April	Serio	Seio-class ship of the line		Guarnizo	Spain	For Spanish Navy.
5 May	Redoutable	Florissant-class ship of the line	François Coulomb	Toulon	Kingdom of France	For French Navy.
21 July	Palmier	Palmier-class ship of the line	Joseph Véronique Charles Chapelle	Brest	Kingdom of France	For French Navy.
27 July	Saint Louis	East Indiaman	Nicolas Levesque	Lorient	Kingdom of France	For Compagnie des Indes.
29 July	Julia Maria	Man of war		Copenhagen	Denmark-Norway	For Dano-Norwegian Navy.
14 August	Falmouth	East Indiaman	John Perry	Blackwall	Great Britain	For British East India Company.
31 August	Cruizer	Cruizer-class sloop	William Rule	Deptford Dockyard	Great Britain	For Royal Navy.
1 September	Héros	Third rate	Joseph Véronique Charles Chapelle	Brest	Kingdom of France	For French Navy.
21 September	Le Duc de Bourgogne	East Indiaman	Gilles Cambry	Lorient	Kingdom of France	For Compagnie des Indes.
23 September	Donder	Bomb vessel	D. Sutherland	Saint Petersburg	Russian Empire	For Imperial Russian Navy.
7 October	Ranger	Fly-class sloop	Adam Hayes	Woolwich Dockyard	Great Britain	For Royal Navy.
12 October	Dronning Juliane Marie	Third rate		Copenhagen	Denmark-Norway	For Dano-Norwegian Navy.
12 October	Moen	Man of war		Copenhagen	Denmark-Norway	For Dano-Norwegian Navy.
21 October	Rose	Fifth rate		Toulon	Kingdom of France	For French Navy.
21 October	Speedwell	Cruizer-class sloop	Sir Thomas Slade	Chatham Dockyard	Great Britain	For Royal Navy.
20 November	África	Third rate	Matthew Mullins	Cádiz	Spain	For Spanish Navy.
7 December	Falmouth	Fourth rate	Thomas Fellowes	Woolwich Dockyard	Great Britain	For Royal Navy
15 December	Actif	Illustre-class ship of the line	Pierre Salinoc	Brest	Kingdom of France	For French Navy.
Unknown date	Cuddalore	Schooner		Bombay	India	For Bombay Pilot Service.
Unknown date	Egmont	East Indiaman		London	Great Britain	For British East India Company.
Unknown date	Éveillé	Third Rate	Chevallier Antoine Groignard	Rochefort	Kingdom of France	For French Navy.
Unknown date	Hermione	Fifth rate			Spain	For Spanish Navy.
Unknown date	Nymphe	Sixth rate		Rochefort	Kingdom of France	For French Navy.
Unknown date	Sing	Cat	Augustin Pic	Rochefort	Kingdom of France	For French Navy.
Unknown date	Inflexible	Hardi-class ship of the line	Pierre Morineau	Rochefort	Kingdom of France	For French Navy.
Unknown date	San Miguel	Packet boat	Reales Astilleros de Esteiro	Ferrol	Spain	For Spanish Navy.
Unknown date	Thetis	Merchantman	John Brockbank	Lancaster	Great Britain	For private owner.
Unknown date	Walpole	East Indiaman		London	Great Britain	For British East India Company.
Unknown date	Winchelsea	East Indiaman		London	Great Britain	For British East India Company.
