= Siege of Pondicherry =

Siege of Pondicherry (or Pondichéry) may refer to:

- Siege of Pondicherry (1748) during the First Carnatic War (part of the War of the Austrian Succession)
- Siege of Pondicherry (1760) during the Third Carnatic War (part of the Seven Years' War)
- Siege of Pondicherry (1778) during the American Revolutionary War
- Siege of Pondicherry (1793) during the French Revolutionary War

== See also ==
- Battle of Pondicherry, a 1759 naval engagement during the Third Carnatic War
- Pondicherry (disambiguation)
