= Pondichéry (1754 ship) =

French merchant ship

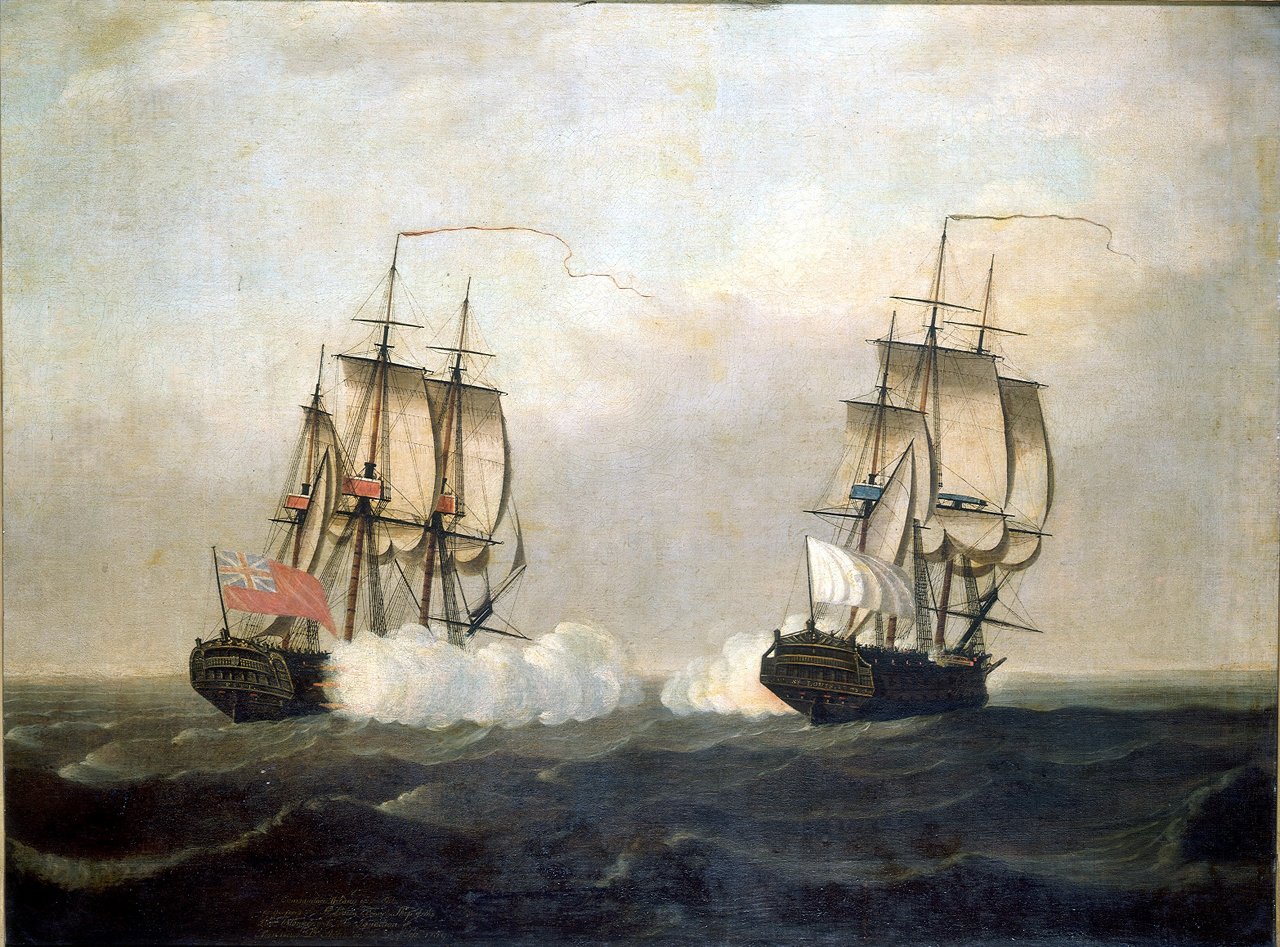
- Pitt (left) engaging Saint Louis on 29 September 1758

History

France
- Name: Pondichéry
- Namesake: Pondicherry
- Builder: Gilles Cambry (fils), Port l'Orient
- Laid down: March 1754
- Launched: December 1754
- Fate: Captured 23 December 1756

British East India Company
- Name: Pitt
- Namesake: Pitt the Elder
- Owner: Charles Raymond
- Operator: East India Company
- Acquired: By purchase 1757

General characteristics
- Type: East Indiaman
- Tons burthen: 800, or 600, (bm)
- Length: 128'9" (keel 111'8") (Note: All linear measurements are in French feet.)
- Beam: 34'6"
- Draught: 14'6"
- Propulsion: Sail
- Complement: Pondichéry: 11 officers and 154 men; Pondicherry:220; Pitt (as warship):250; Pitt (as merchantman):120
- Armament: Pondichéry: 20 × 8-pounder guns, pierced for 56; Pondicherry: 24 × 6 & 9-pounders; Pitt (as warship):50-4 guns; Pitt (as merchantman):30 guns

Pondicherry (or Pondichéry) was a French East Indiaman, launched in December 1754, that the Royal Navy captured in 1756, early in the Seven Years' War with France. She was then sold and her new owners, who renamed her Pitt, proceeded to charter her to the British East India Company (EIC), for three voyages. During her first voyage she engaged a French warship, and then went on to chart a new route, Pitt's Passage, through the East Indies on the way to China. The EIC found this new route of the utmost importance as it was faster than their existing route, and was navigable in all seasons. After her return from her third voyage Pitt disappears from readily available online sources.

== Significance ==
It is her first voyage for the EIC, under the command of William Wilson, that is of the greatest significance. Wilson sailed Pitt to China via a route between Java and New Guinea. The EIC had avoided sailing through the East Indies since the 1623 Amboyna massacre. The Dutch East India Company was hostile towards the EIC, fearing that the EIC would compete with them in sourcing pepper and spices. Throughout his voyage via the East Indies, Wilson kept extensive notes, made charts, and on them corrected the location of several islands and other geographical features. When he arrived in Canton, he had two sets of his charts prepared, one for the EIC governor at Madras and one that the EIC representatives at Canton could copy for their vessels.

The direct route through the Sunda Strait to Macao is 1800 nautical miles; the route via Pitt's Passage is 3725 nautical miles, but quicker. Furthermore, the route via the Sunda Strait depended on the southwest monsoon in the China sea.

== Pondichéry ==
Pondichéry sailed for China on 15 January 1755 under the command of Captain Pierre de Sanguinet.

HMS Dover, under the command of Captain Christopher Hill, captured Pondicherry on 23 December 1756 after an engagement of two hours. She lost her second captain and 11 men killed, and 18 wounded; the British sustained no casualties. Pondicherry had been sailing from Canton when Dover intercepted her in "the Bay", and brought her into Cork. Dover then brought Pondicherry into the Nore. She was valued at £160,000, though given what she herself sold for, almost all the value rested in her cargo.

== Pitt ==
The EIC purchased Pondicherry on 5 October 1757 for £4525. Her new owner refitted her and renamed her Pitt. The EIC hired her in November 1757. On 23 December 1757, the EIC appointed Wilson, late of the Indiaman Suffolk, "commodore and commander of all the vessels in the Company's service". (Note: Earlier that year, on 9 March, in Suffolk, Wilson was in company with the Indiamen Houghton, Walpole, master, and Godolphin, Hutchinson, master, when they encountered the French ship of the line Comte de Provence, and the frigate Sylphide. (Both of these vessels belonged to the Compagnie des Indes Orientales, the French counterpart to the EIC, and not to the Marine Royale, the French navy.) When it appeared that he could not outsail the French vessels, Wilson ordered his companions to form line of battle and moved to engage. The French commander decided that the three merchantmen were not worth jeopardizing his mission and sailed away. For this boldness the EIC awarded Wilson a gold medal worth 100 guineas.) He took command of Pitt in January 1758.

She then went on to perform three voyages to Madras and China for the EIC, though only on the first was she under Wilson's command. The EIC had talked of a heavily armed merchantman for some two years and Pitt suited their plans. Pondicherry had had only 24 guns, so a lower tier of gunports had to be cut into her sides to accommodate a doubling of her cannons. The EIC classed her as a warship, and in addition to arming her heavily, gave her a larger crew than a merchantman of her size would normally carry. (Suffolk, Wilson's former command, of 499 tons (bm), carried 26 guns and 99 crew.)

=== Voyage #1 (1758–1760) ===
Wilson sailed from Portsmouth on 6 May 1758. Pitt left under escort by the 74-gun HMS Grafton and the 60-gun fourth rate HMS Sunderland. (Note: Sunderland went on to remain in the East indies and foundered in a tropical storm on 1 January 1761 with the loss of almost her entire crew.) Pitt was carrying a cargo worth £31,832, Colonel Sir William Draper, and two companies of the regiment that Draper had raised, the 79th Regiment of Foot.

Wilson wanted to stop at St Jago, but the presence there of some French warships forced him steer to Fernando de Noronha, which he reached on 3 May. By 21 July Pitt was at St Augustine's Bay, where he stopped to get limes to treat scurvy. By 14 September she was at Madras.

At Madras the soldiers disembarked, though 28 of their number had died on the voyage. Pitt also discharged her cargo. The EIC's original plan had been that Pitt would accompany the China fleet through the East Indies. However, she had arrived too late and the fleet had left. She also could not remain on the Coromandel Coast as the hurricane season was approaching and she would be too exposed. Wilson decided to sail for China. He took with him a snow, the Surprize, that could act as a scout on the new route he wished to take.

After Pitt had left Madras and was off Fort St. David, near Pondicherry, on 29 September she encountered a large, armed French ship. Wilson decided to engage, and the two vessels exchanged broadsides. Wilson discovered that because the weather was unsettled, when Pitt opened her lower gun ports to fire water came in, and he had to close them. Wilson estimated that with his lower gun deck out of action, his opponent outgunned him by 13 guns, and decided to break off the action. Pitt then out-sailed her adversary. Later, it turned out that the French vessel was the East Indiaman Saint Louis, under the command of Captain Louis de Joannis, and belonged to the Indian Ocean Squadron under the command of Anne Antoine, Comte d'Aché. (Note: Saint Louis was armed with 50–54 guns, as was Pitt. The vessels of d'Aché's squadron belonged to the Compagnie des Indes Orientales. Not quite three weeks earlier, Saint Louis had participated in the highly sanguinary but militarily indecisive battle of Pondicherry.)

On 20 October Pitt reached Quedah on the coast of Malaya. This was the rendezvous point that he had agreed with Surprize should they get separated. From there Pitt reached Malacca on 10 November, and Batavia on 15 December.

At Batavia, Wilson took on provisions, while dissembling his intentions to the suspicious Dutch. Still, in a letter to the Dutch Governor-General, Wilson wrote "...the English had a right to navigate wherever it has pleased God to send water."

On 29 December Pitt reached the island of Palau Karimum Jawa and then sailed on to Palau Madura, where she turned north. On 2 January 1759 Pitt and Surprize encountered a Dutch vessel whose master provided helpful sailing information and a chart. Pitt then sailed between the Celebes and Selayar Island, before anchoring in the Boeteong Straits on 10 January. (Note: This appears to be a strait by Pulau Buton.) Wilson remained in the vicinity of Wowoni Island until the end of January. Pitt then sailed for the Ceram Sea in February.

Wilson sailed Pitt towards the Raja Ampat Islands and Dampier Strait, but decided to explore a channel to the east that he called Pitt Strait. The strait runs between Batanta and Salawati islands, whereas Dampier Strait proper separates Batanta from Waigeo to its west. Both connected the Ceram Sea to the Pacific.

The route from Palua Buton to the end of Pitt Strait became known as Pitt's Passage. From the strait, Pitt sailed due north, staying well east of Halmahera island and the Philippines. After she reached Batan Island on 25 March, Wilson sailed through the Bashi Channel and headed west. Pitt arrived at Whampoa on 15 April 1759.

For her return to Britain Pitt crossed the Second Bar on 15 May and on 6 June she was at Macao. Wilson decided to retrace his voyage through Pitt's Passage to ensure that it was usable in both directions. On 24 August Pitt was at Batavia and by 2 September she had passed through the Sunda Strait and reached Benkulen. From there she reached St Helena on 9 December and Kinsale on 23 Feb 1760. She arrived at the Downs on 8 April. Her arrival in London was six months earlier than expected.

On 26 June the EIC again gave Wilson a gold medal worth 100 guineas. Wilson did not go to sea again and resigned his position with the EIC in 1762.

After the experiences of the first journey the EIC decided to use Pitt purely as a merchantman. They removed the lower tier of guns and reduced her crew.

=== Voyage #2 (1761–1762) ===
Captain Joseph Jackson sailed from Plymouth on 15 Mar 1761 and arrived at Madras on 23 July. Pitt then arrived at Whampoa on 24 October. For her return to Britain she crossed the Second Bar on 30 November, reached St Helena on 22 April 1762, and arrived at the Downs on 28 July.

=== Voyage #3 (1763–1765) ===
Jackson left the Downs on 21 March 1763.Pitt arrived at Rio on 25 July, Madras on 7 January 1764, and Fort St. Davis on 12 March. One week later she was again at Madras, and by 23 May she had reached Malacca. From there she sailed to Manila, which she reached on 21 July, and Whampoa, where she arrived on 13 September. (Note: Manila had remained under British occupation following the battle of Manila (1762). Although the Treaty of Paris (1763) had returned Manila to Spain, the British Army had only withdrawn in April 1764.) Homeward bound, she crossed the Second Bar on 27 December, and reached Benkulen on 5 March 1765 and St Helena on 18 July. She arrived at the Downs on 7 October.
