= HMS Salisbury (1746) =

Ship of the line of the Royal Navy

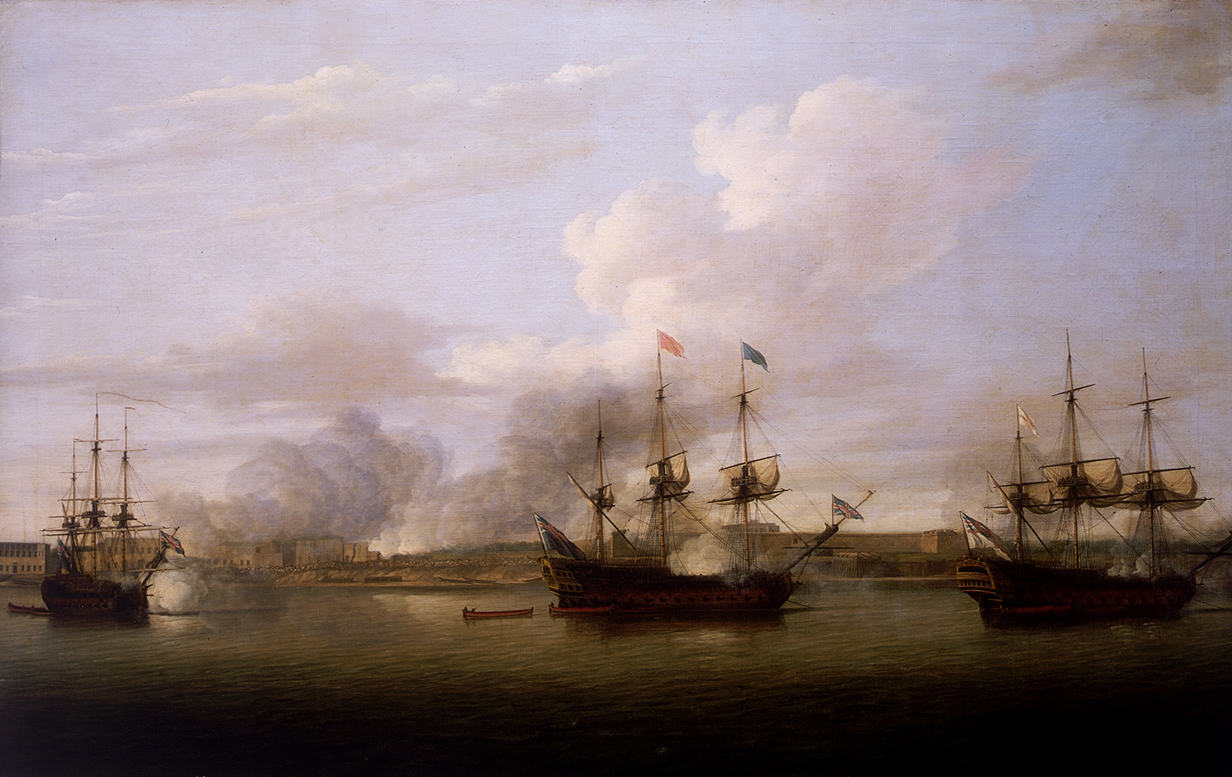
- Salisbury (first from left) at the Battle of Chandannagar

History

Great Britain
- Name: HMS Salisbury
- Ordered: 23 April 1744; Reordered on 2 May 1744
- Builder: Philemon Ewer, East Cowes
- Laid down: 23 May 1744
- Launched: 29 January 1746
- Completed: Between 16 February and 4 April 1746
- Fate: Condemned for breaking up on 24 April 1761

General characteristics
- Class & type: 50-gun fourth rate ship of the line
- Tons burthen: 976 83/94 bm
- Length: 140 ft (42.7 m) (overall); 113 ft 10 in (34.7 m) (keel)
- Beam: 40 ft 2 in (12.2 m)
- Depth of hold: 17 ft 2.5 in (5.25 m)
- Sail plan: Full-rigged ship
- Complement: 300
- Armament: Lower deck: 22 × 24-pdrs; Upper deck: 22 × 12-pdrs; Quarterdeck: 4 × 6-pdrs; Forecastle: 2 × 6-pdrs

HMS Salisbury was a 50-gun fourth rate ship of the line of the Royal Navy. She was built during the War of the Austrian Succession and went on to see action in the Seven Years' War, serving in the East Indies.

Salisbury started her career in the western approaches, where she took part in blockades of the French coast and cruises against French ships and privateers, serving with Sir George Anson and Sir Peter Warren's fleets. During this period Salisbury's surgeon carried out experiments into the use of citrus fruit against scurvy. After some time spent as a guardship at Plymouth during the peace, Salisbury was sent to the East Indies, where she spent the rest of her career.

Salisbury was active during the Seven Years' War, serving with George Pocock's fleet, and seeing action in most of his engagements with the Comte d'Aché. She fought at Cuddalore, Negapatam and Pondicherry, and remained in the East Indies until being condemned as unserviceable at Bombay in 1761.

== Construction and commissioning ==
Salisbury was ordered to the designs of the 1741 proposals from Philemon Ewer at East Cowes on 23 April 1744, with the order being repeated on 2 May 1744. She was laid down on 23 May 1744 and launched on 29 January 1746. Salisbury was completed at Portsmouth between 16 February and 4 April 1746, having cost £13,068.0.0d to build with a further £4,707.9.0d spent on fitting her out. She was commissioned in January 1746 under her first commander, Captain George Edgcumbe.

== War of the Austrian Succession ==
Salisbury was assigned to the Western Squadron, which patrolled the sea areas around the Bay of Biscay and the western approaches of the English Channel. She was with Sir George Anson's fleet off Cape Finisterre between September and October 1746, and again in 1747. On 31 March 1747 she captured the 30-gun French East Indiaman Jason. The captured vessel was brought to Portsmouth as a prize, with Salisbury returning to sea on 2 April. On 11 April she captured a small French fishing vessel and sent her to Plymouth as a prize. Over the following weeks Salisbury patrolled the Bay of Biscay near the Loire estuary.

=== Lind's experiments ===
Serving aboard Salisbury during this period was Surgeon James Lind, who carried out several experiments during her sixth patrol in the approaches to demonstrate the effectiveness of citrus fruit as a cure for scurvy. Lind's experiment began on 20 May 1747, when he selected a dozen men with scurvy and tested possible remedies comprising cider, elixir of vitriol, vinegar, sea water, oranges and lemons, and a purgative mixture. By the time Salisbury returned to Plymouth at the end of May, the two assigned to citrus fruit had recovered. Lind published his Treatise on the subject in 1753. Though not considered the first ever clinical trial ever conducted, Lind's experiments aboard Salisbury was the first clinical trial to include control groups. Despite Lind's findings, citrus foods were not adopted as a staple in Royal navy shipboard provisions until 1795.

== Peace and Seven Years' War ==
Salisbury was surveyed on 20 January 1749 and underwent repairs at Plymouth from December 1749 until February 1751. She was recommissioned in January 1753 under Captain Thomas Knowler and served as the Plymouth guardship. She was again fitted out, in February 1754, and sailed to the East Indies in March that year. During the Seven Years' War she took part in the capture of Geriah on 14 January 1756, and the following year came under the command of Captain William Martin. She participated in the Battle of Chandannagar. Martin was succeeded in April 1758 by Captain John Somerset. Salisbury was present at the Battle of Cuddalore on 29 April 1758, fighting with George Pocock's fleet against the Comte d'Aché. Captain William Brereton took command in June 1758, and under him Salisbury fought at the Battle of Negapatam on 3 August 1758. She was under Captain Digby Dent from 1759, though Captain Sir William Baird had taken over by March that year. Salisbury fought at the Battle of Pondicherry on 10 September 1759, and remained in the East Indies until finally condemned to be broken up as unserviceable at Bombay on 24 April 1761.
