= Digby Dent (Royal Navy officer, born 1739) =

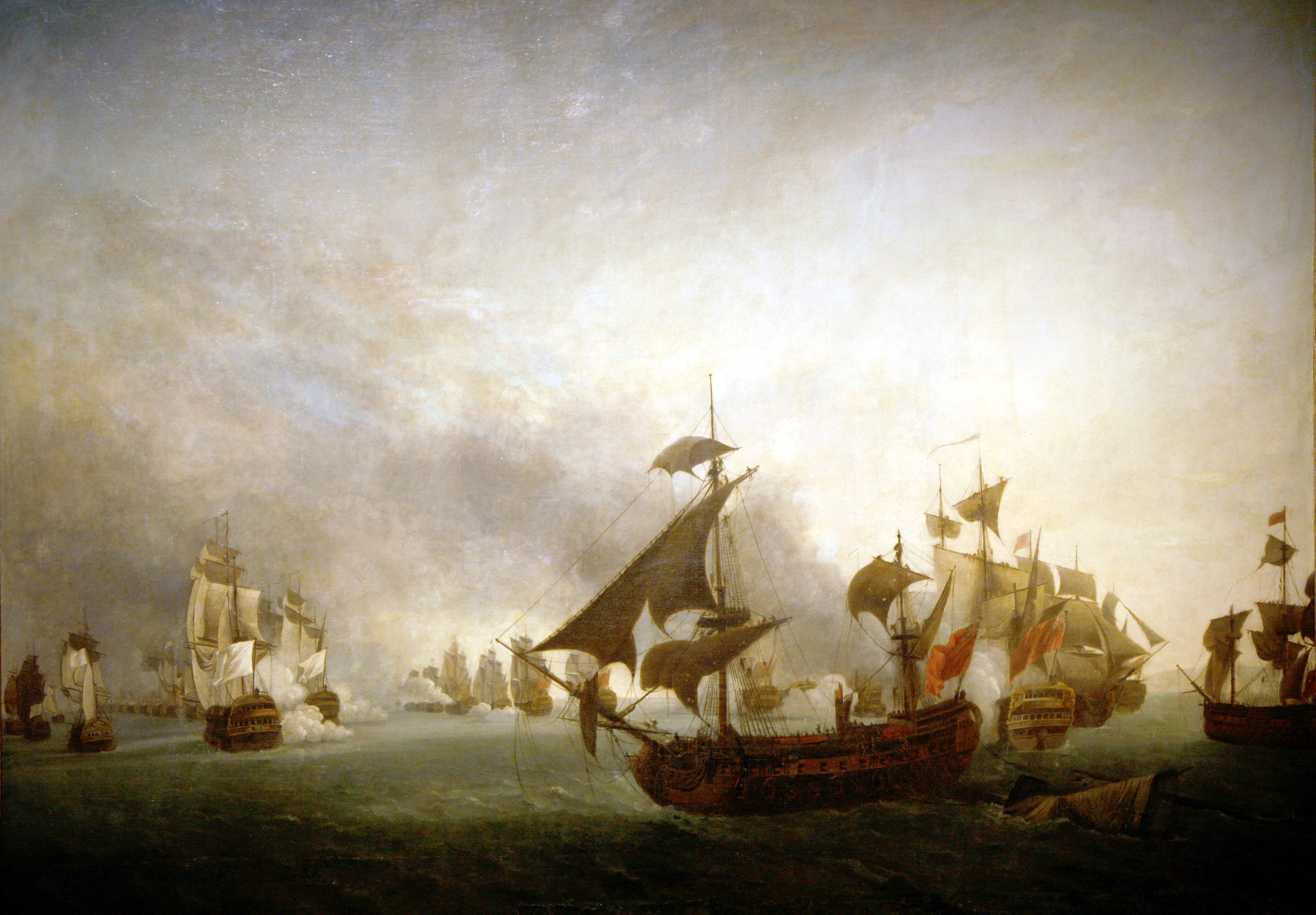
The Battle of Grenada

Rear Admiral Sir Digby Dent (1739–1817) was a Royal Navy commander.

== Life ==
He was from a long line of "Digby Dents" who served in the Royal Navy including his grandfather and uncle. He was baptised in Portsmouth on 16 November 1739 one of eight children of Captain Cotton Dent RN and his wife, Catherine ("Kitty") Bowerbank (1717–1804). His father became Captain of Greenwich Hospital and died there in 1761.

He was commissioned as a lieutenant in the Royal Navy on 4 February 1758. In July 1758 he was given captaincy and command of the 24-gun HMS Queenborough in the East Indies under Vice Admiral George Pocock and fought the French fleet in the Battle of Negapatam and the Battle of Pondicherry in the Indian Ocean. He transferred to HMS Newcastle the day after the latter battle to replace Captain Colin Michie who was killed in the engagement but remained stationed off Pondicherry.

He was given command on New Year's Day 1760 of the 50-gunner HMS Falmouth, remaining in the East Indies. In September 1760, he took command of HMS Tiger. Both Queenborough and Newcastle went down in a cyclone off Pondicherry on New Year's Day 1761.

In 1762, he returned to Europe on a Dutch East Indiaman. In May 1763, he was given command of HMS Deal Castle which served in the Mediterranean including a diplomatic mission to Cádiz. From July 1766 to May 1768 he had an extended period of leave, before taking command of HMS Boreas in Woolwich Dockyard.

Boreas sprung a leak in the English Channel and was condemned causing another period of leave from February 1769 to April 1770, which allowed him time to be with his second wife and young family. He then spent a year on HMS Dolphin before another two-year break, March 1771 to April 1773 before taking command of HMS Seahorse. The most noteworthy event during his command of Seahorse was Horatio Nelson's appearance as a midshipman under Dent's command. In June 1775 he moved to HMS Arethusa mainly based in Portsmouth. Arethusa's task was protecting the harbour against feared attach by John Paul Jones but was also asked to do convoy work to St Helena.

On Boxing Day 1776 he was given the 80-gun HMS Princess Amelia to command but despite two years with the ship saw no action and was again mainly based in Portsmouth.

He was knighted (Knight Bachelor) in May 1778 by King George III during the King's review of the Fleet at Spithead.

In December 1778 he was given active command of the 64-gun HMS Vigilant and took her to the West Indies where on 6 July 1779 he took part in the Battle of Grenada. In August 1779 he took command of the larger (74-gun) HMS Royal Oak which had also fought in the battle. However his main task with Royal Oak was to return her to England to refit with a copper bottom, arriving Portsmouth on 4 December 1779. He then spent 8 months with his family before commanding HMS Raisonnable from August 1780. He took command off the coast of North America following the assault on Hampton Roads. It is not recorded how he crossed from Portsmouth to America. He returned the ship to Portsmouth on 23 November. On the same day he was given command of his final ship, the newly completed HMS Repulse which he commanded for a year, including action at the Relief of Gibraltar in April 1781.

He spent his final years in Portsmouth and retired in May 1788 at the rank of rear-admiral.

He died at Clontarf near Dublin on 15 February 1817 and was buried on 17 February.

== Family ==
He was married three times: firstly to Susanna (who died before 1769) with whom he had a son, Commodore Digby Dent (1764–1798), and three daughters. (Commodore Digby Dent married Frances Butler Saunders and they were parents to Rear Admiral Charles Calmady Dent.)

He next married Elizabeth Greentree of St. Helena, daughter of James Greentree, on 5 April 1762, with whom he had three sons and six daughters. She died in childbirth in November 1769 at home in Fareham near Portsmouth.

His third wife, Lady Elizabeth Dent, bore him one more son, giving a total of 14 children.

In 1787, his son, Commodore Digby Dent, served as best man at Horatio Nelson's wedding on Nevis in the West Indies.

Another son, Chaloner Dent, was named after Admiral Chaloner Ogle, commander of the fleet. Chaloner's son, born in Gibraltar, again Digby Dent (1805-1888) became a hotel keeper in Portsmouth.

Digby Dent's sister, Caroline Dent, married Rear Admiral John Stanhope.
