= French ship Minotaure =

Ship of the line of the French Navy

History

(Kingdom of France) French Royal Navy
- Namesake: Minotaur
- Builder: Jacques-Luc Coulomb Company
- Laid down: 1755
- Launched: February 1757
- Completed: February 1758
- Commissioned: March 1758
- Stricken: 1785
- Homeport: Brest Arsenal, Brest
- Fate: Broken up in June 1787

General characteristics
- Type: Third-rate ship of the line
- Displacement: 2800 tonneaux
- Tons burthen: 1500 port tonneaux
- Length: 168 French feet (51.21 metres)
- Beam: 43 French feet 6 inches (14.02 metres)
- Draught: 20 French feet 6 inches (6.66 metres)
- Decks: 2 gun decks
- Sail plan: Full-rigged ship
- Complement: 759 officers and men
- Armament: 74 guns: Lower gundeck: 28 × 36-pounder long guns; Upper gun deck: 30 × 18-pounder long guns; Quarterdeck: 10 × 8-pounder long guns; Forecastle: 6 × 8-pounder long gun
- Armour: timber

Minotaure was a 74-gun ship of the line of the Royal French Navy, constructed between 1755 and 1757 at the Brest Arsenal in Brest, Brittany.

== History ==
Between 1755 and 1757 the Minotaure was constructed by the Jacques-Luc Coulomb Company at the Brest Arsenal in Brest, Brittany. She was launched in February 1757 and commissioned in March 1758. In 1759 the ship was deployed to Mauritius.

While in Mauritius, the ship was commanded by Captain Anne Marie Charles de la Bourdonnaye and joined the Count of Aché's Indian Squadron. On 10 September 1759, the squadron moved towards southern India planning on intercepting the Royal British Navy squadron moving into the area near Pondichéry. Shortly after arrival, the squadron engaged the British at the Battle of Pondicherry, which was indecisive. On 10 September 1759, the Captain Bourdonnaye was removed, but his replacement is unknown.

By July 1781, the ship was converted to a floating battery in Saint-Domingue. In 1785 the ship was hulked in Brest, by order of 31 July 1782 and subsequently stricken from the naval register. In 1784, she was withdrawn from service, having ever seen battle just once.

In June 1787, she was broken up.

== Specifications ==
The armament of the ship was as follows:

- Guns
  - Lower gun deck: 28 × 36-pounder long guns
  - Upper gun deck: 30 × 18-pounder long guns
  - Quarterdeck: 10 × 8-pounder long guns
  - Forecastle: 6 × 8-pounder long gun
- Crew: 759 officers and men
- Length: 168 French feet (51.21 metres)
- Width: 43 French feet 6 inches (14.02 metres)
- Depth: 20 French feet 6 inches (6.66 metres)
