= Robert Fanshawe =

Robert Fanshawe may refer to:

- Robert Fanshawe (Royal Navy officer) (1740–1823), naval commander and member of parliament for Plymouth
- Robert Fanshawe (British Army officer) (1863–1946), divisional commander in the First World War
