= French ship Actif =

Twenty-two ships of the French Navy have borne the name Actif ("Active"):

== Ships named Actif ==
- Palmier (1671), a 36-gun ship of the line, bore the name during her career
- Étoile (1672), a fireship, bore the name during her career
- Émerillon (1672), a 34-gun frigate, bore the name during her career
- Fanfaron (1673), a fireship, bore the name during her career
- Actif (1675), a fireship
- Actif (1676), a fireship
- Actif (1752), a 64-gun Illustre-class ship of the line
- Actif (1767), a 74-gun Citoyen-class ship of the line
- Actif (1779), a 12-gun cutter
- Actif (1791), a brig
- Actif (1793), a 2-gun cutter captured from the British
- Actif (1793), a 4-gun cutter
- Actif (1795), a gunboat
- Actif (1799), a 12-gun brig
- Actif (1799), a 4-gun cutter
- Actif (1821), a brig
- Actif (1836), a paddle steam tug
- Actif (1839), a schooner
- Actif (1862), an aviso
- Actif (1914), an auxiliary minesweeper
- Actif (1940), a tug
- Actif (1963), a coastal tug

== Bibliography ==
- Roche, Jean-Michel (2005a). Dictionnaire des bâtiments de la flotte de guerre française de Colbert à nos jours. Vol. 1. Group Retozel-Maury Millau. pp. 20–21. ISBN 978-2-9525917-0-6. OCLC 165892922.
- Roche, Jean-Michel (2005b). Dictionnaire des bâtiments de la flotte de guerre française de Colbert à nos jours. Vol. 2. Group Retozel-Maury Millau. p. 20. ISBN 978-2-9525917-0-6. OCLC 165892922.
