= Thomas Pocock =

Thomas Pocock may refer to:

- Tom Pocock (1925–2007), English biographer, war correspondent, journalist and naval historian
- Thomas Pocock (clergyman) (1672–1745), English clergyman and diarist
