= Pudu (disambiguation) =

Pudu is a type of small deer.

Pudu may also refer to:

- Pudu, Kuala Lumpur, a town in Malaysia
- Pudu, Dakshina Kannada, a town in India
- Pudu River, a river in China
- Puducherry (disambiguation) or Pondicherry, a union territory and city in India, often shortened to Pudu or Pondi

== See also ==
- Pondi (disambiguation)
