= Siege of Madras =

Part of Seven Years' War

- Part of Seven Years' War
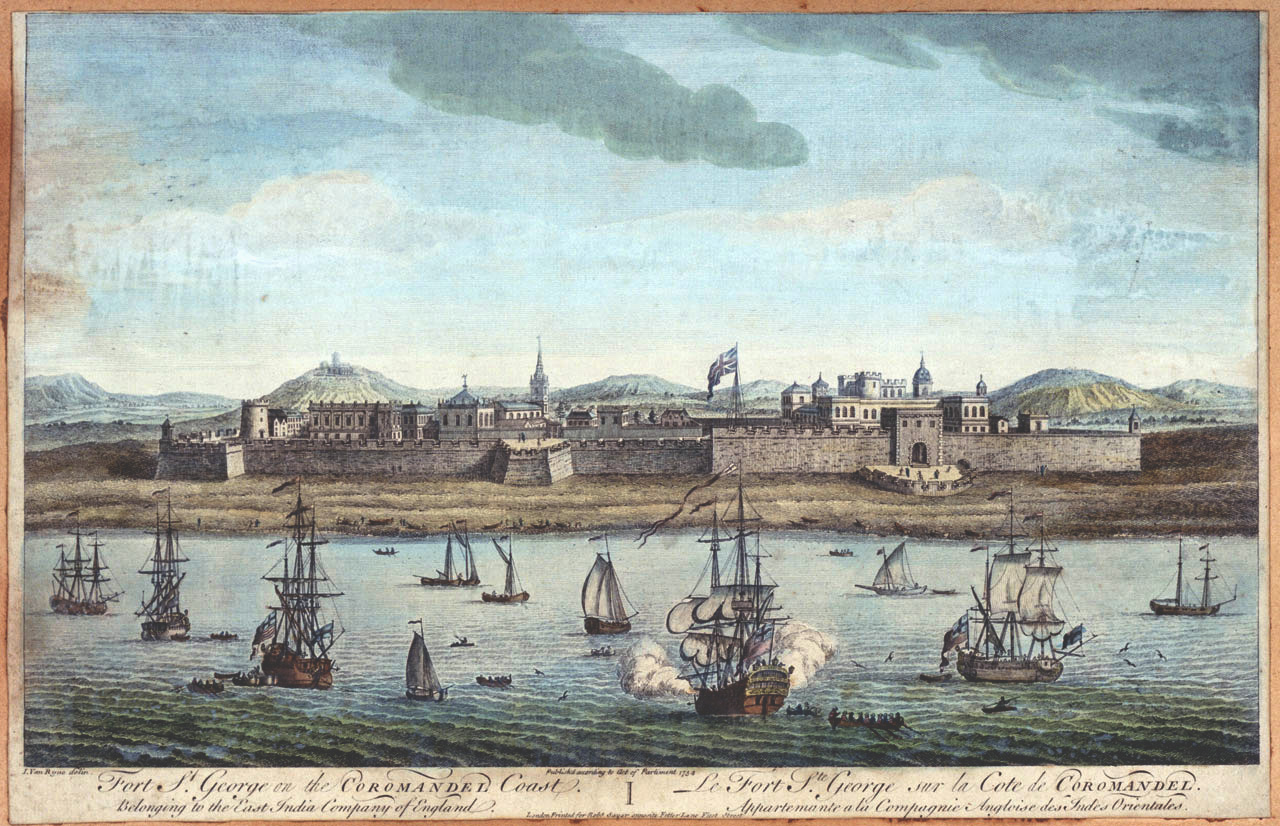
- Fort St. George in 1754
Date	December 1758 – February 1759
Location	Madras, Madras Presidency, India 13.0901°N 80.2701°E
Result	British victory

Belligerents
Kingdom of Great Britain: East India Company	Kingdom of France: French East India Company

Commanders and leaders
(Kingdom of Great Britain) William Draper (Kingdom of Great Britain) Muhammad Yusuf Khan (Mauthanayagam Pillai - Commander of Paraiyar Regiment) (Kingdom of Great Britain) Major John Caillaud (Kingdom of Great Britain) Abdul Wahab; Nawab of the Carnatic	(Kingdom of France) Comte de Lally (Kingdom of France) Marquis de Bussy-Castelnau

Strength
3,900 total 2,200 sepoys 1,700 Europeans	8,000 total 4,000 Europeans; 3,400 sepoys 600 native cavalry

Casualties and losses
Unknown	1,200

Madras, held by the British, was besieged between December 1758 and February 1759 by French forces under the command of Comte de Lally during the Seven Years' War. The British garrison was able to hold out until it was relieved.

The British victory contributed to the Annus Mirabilis of 1759.

== Background ==
Great Britain and France had been struggling for control in India for several years. In 1746 the city had been captured by the French during the War of the Austrian Succession, but it was returned to the British in 1748. Following the fresh outbreak of war both sides were soon in conflict again. By 1757 Britain held the upper hand in India after several victories by Robert Clive. In 1758, French reinforcements under Lally had arrived in Pondicherry and set about advancing France's position on the Coromandel Coast, notably capturing Fort St. David. This caused alarm to the British, most of whose troops were with Clive in Bengal. Lally was poised to strike against Madras in June 1758, but short of money, he launched an unsuccessful attack on Tanjore hoping to raise revenue there. By the time he was ready to launch his assault on Madras it was December before the first French troops reached Madras, delayed partly by the onset of the monsoon season. This gave the British extra time to prepare their defences and withdraw their outposts, increasing the garrison to nearly 4,000 troops.

== Siege ==
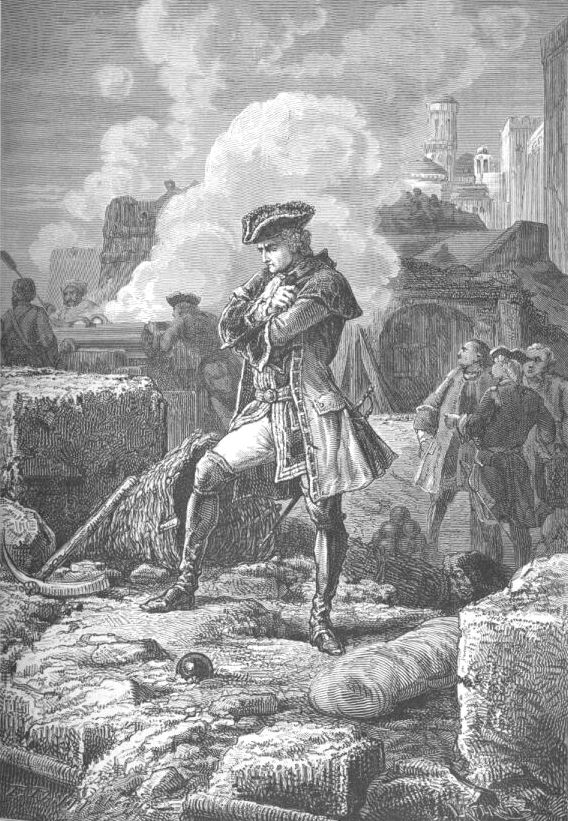
The French commander at Madras, Lally, depicted at the later Siege of Pondicherry by Paul Philipotteaux.

=== First skirmishes ===
Madras in 1758 was divided broadly into two distinct parts. The "Black town", or "Great Parachery", where the majority of the native Paraiyar population lived and which was unfortified - and the "White town" where the smaller European population lived, which was dominated by Fort St George. On 14 December, French troops entered the Black town unopposed, and finding it undefended, began to loot the houses. The British then launched a sortie with 600 men under Colonel William Draper attacking the scattered French. Bloody street fighting broke out which left 300 dead on each side, before Draper's men withdrew into the fort. While the result had been indecisive, and casualties even, the fight had a devastating effect on French morale. The two French commanders, Lally and Bussy, began arguing over the failure to cut off and trap Draper's raiding force. Lally fiercely criticised Bussy in public, but did not dismiss him from his post as second-in-command.

=== Bombardment commences ===
As the French took up their positions around the city, ready to besiege Fort St George, they were unable to open fire as they were still waiting for artillery ammunition to be brought up for the major siege guns. For three weeks the guns stood silent, until on 2 January 1759 they began firing on the citadel. In spite of an intense five-day bombardment and several infantry assaults, the French failed to make a breakthrough, as the British defences remained largely intact. A large mine was detonated under the fortress, but this also made little impact on the defences.

French morale fell further as they realised how little effect their attacks had had on the defenders. Many of the soldiers grew disgruntled and deserted, including 150 who switched sides to join the garrison. Lally was also facing an attack on his lines of supply by Muhammed Yusuf Khan, the British Sepoy commander of Madras Paraiyar Regiment at Chingleput; the only force that had not withdrawn into Madras upon the approach of the French. Lally managed to beat off the British attack, but they still remained in the vicinity menacing his rear, stealing much needed supplies and blocking the passage of many to his forces.

=== Major assault ===
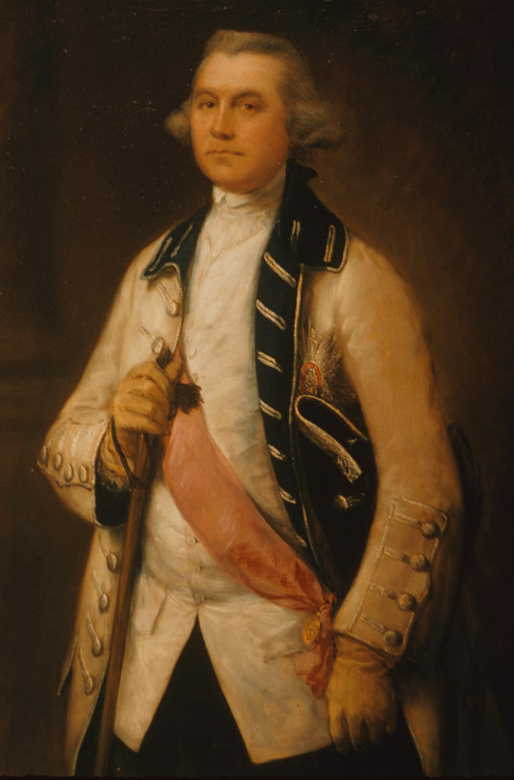
William Draper who commanded the British defenders during the siege.

After several weeks of heavy bombardment, the French were at last starting to make headway against the town's defences. The main bastion had been destroyed, and a breach opened in the walls. The heavy exchange of fire had flattened much of Madras, with most of the town's houses gutted by shells.

On 30 January a Royal Navy frigate ran the French blockade and carried a large sum of money and a company of reinforcements into Madras. Significantly they brought the news that the British fleet under Admiral George Pocock was on its way from Calcutta. When Lally discovered this news he became aware that he would have to launch an all-or-nothing assault to storm the fortress before Pocock arrived. He convened a council of war, where it was agreed to launch an intense bombardment on the British guns, to knock them out of action.

=== French withdrawal ===
On 16 February, six British vessels carrying 600 troops arrived off Madras. Faced with this added threat, Lally took the immediate decision to break off the siege and withdraw south.

== Aftermath ==
The British fired 26,554 cannonballs and more than 200,000 cartridge rounds in defence of the town. The failure to take Madras was a huge disappointment for the French and a massive setback to their campaign in India.

The British victory at Madras was considered part of the Annus Mirabilis of 1759, a string of British successes around the globe, and helped lay the foundations for eventual British strategic supremacy in India. British forces went on the offensive in India, decisively defeating a French force at Wandiwash and then capturing Pondicherry in 1761. This string of battles were a major turning point in the battle for dominance on the subcontinent between Britain and France.

== See also ==
- Great Britain in the Seven Years War

== Bibliography ==
- Anderson, Fred. Crucible of War: The Seven Years' War and the Fate of Empire in British North America, 1754-1766. Faber and Faber, 2001
- Harvey, Robert. Clive: The Life and Death of a British Emperor. Sceptre, 1999.
- Keay, John. The Honourable Company: A History of the English East India Company. Harper Collins, 1993
- McLynn, Frank. 1759: The Year Britain Became Master of the World. Pimlico, 2005.
