= William Bedford (Royal Navy officer) =

Vice-Admiral William Bedford
- Born: c. 1764
- Died: October 1827
- Military career
- Allegiance: United Kingdom of Great Britain and Ireland
- Branch: Royal Navy
- Rank: Vice-Admiral
- Commands: HMS Queen; HMS Royal Sovereign; HMS Leyden; HMS Thunderer; HMS Hibernia
- Conflicts: American Revolutionary War; French Revolutionary Wars; Atlantic campaign of May 1794; Glorious First of June; Battle of Groix; Raids on Boulogne; Napoleonic Wars; Battle of the Basque Roads

Vice-Admiral William Bedford (c. 1764 – October 1827) was an officer of the Royal Navy. He served during the American War of Independence and the French Revolutionary and Napoleonic Wars.

== Biography ==
He was made a lieutenant in the navy on 12 September 1781. Of his earlier appointments there is no published record; but he served during the Russian armament of 1791 as a lieutenant of HMS Edgar. He was afterwards in HMS Formidable, and in May 1794 was first-lieutenant of HMS Queen, carrying the flag of Rear-Admiral Alan Gardner during the Atlantic campaign of May 1794 and the Glorious First of June. Prior to the battle, on 29 May the captain of the Queen, John Hutt, was severely wounded in battle with French ships. Bedford therefore commanded the Queen on 1 June, and for his service on that memorable day was, on the captain's death some weeks later, posted into the vacancy, on 15 August. He continued in the Queen with Sir Alan Gardner, and was present with the fleet under Admiral Lord Bridport at the Battle of Groix on 23 June 1795.

Afterwards he transferred with Sir Alan to HMS Royal Sovereign, and continued with him until he struck his flag in August 1800. Bedford was then appointed to the 68-gun HMS Leyden in the North Sea, and was present at the raids on Boulogne on 15 August 1801, on which occasion he offered to serve as a volunteer under the junior officer in command of the boats. The offer, however, was declined by Lord Nelson. In 1803 he was captain of the 74-gun HMS Thunderer, and in 1805, in HMS Hibernia, flagship of his old chief, now Lord Gardner, commanding the blockade of Brest. Afterwards, in 1809, he was flag-captain in HMS Caledonia with Lord Gambier, at the Battle of the Basque Roads, from which, though he escaped blameless, it was impossible to derive any credit. He attained flag-rank on 12 August 1812, and served in the North Sea under Sir William Young as captain of the fleet. He had no further service, though on 19 July 1821 he was promoted to the rank of vice-admiral. He died in October 1827.

In 1808 Bedford married Susan, one of the nine daughters of Captain Robert Fanshawe, commissioner of the navy at Portsmouth, and was thus a brother-in-law of Sir Thomas Byam Martin, comptroller of the navy, and of Admiral Sir Robert Stopford.
