= French ship Bien-Aimé (1756) =

58-gun ship of the line of the French Navy

History

France
- Name: Bien-Aimé
- Launched: 24 August 1756
- Fate: Wrecked

General characteristics
- Tons burthen: 1490 port tonneaux
- Sail plan: Full-rigged ship
- Armament: 58 to 68 guns

Bien-Aimé was a 58-gun ship of the line of the French Navy.

== Construction ==
Bien-Aimé was built for the French East India Company.

== Career ==
Bien-Aimé departed for the Indian Ocean on 3 May 1757.

She took part in the Battle of Cuddalore on 29 April 1758, during the Seven Years' War, under Captain Bouvet. Bien-Aimé fought the lead ship of the English line. After the battle, a gust threw Bien-Aimé on the coast. She proved impossible to refloat and became a total loss.
