= George Pocock =

Royal Navy officer (1706–1792)

Admiral Sir George Pocock KB
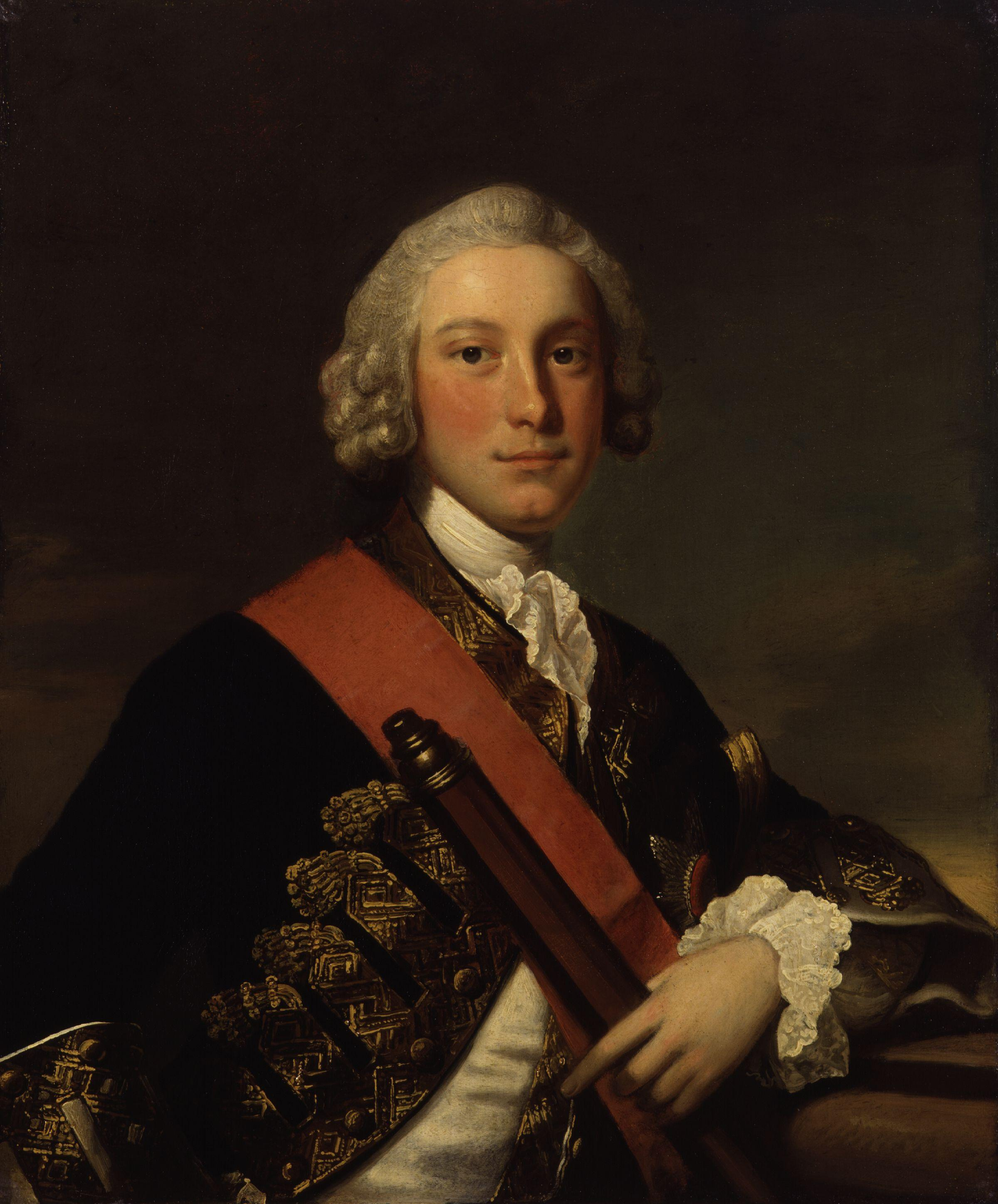
- Portrait by Thomas Hudson
- Born: 6 March 1706; Thames Ditton, Surrey
- Died: 3 April 1792 (aged 86); Curzon Street, London
- Military career
- Allegiance: Great Britain
- Branch: Royal Navy
- Service years: 1718–1766
- Rank: Admiral
- Commands: HMS Cumberland; East Indies Station
- Conflicts: Seven Years' War; Battle of Cuddalore; Battle of Negapatam; Battle of Pondicherry; Battle of Havana
- Awards: Knight of the Bath

Admiral Sir George Pocock KB (6 March 1706 – 3 April 1792) was a Royal Navy officer who served in the Seven Years' War.

== Family ==
Pocock was born in Thames Ditton in Surrey, the son of Thomas Pocock, a chaplain in the Royal Navy. His great grandfather was Rev. Dr. Laurence Pocock, Rector of Brightwalton in Berkshire, and his ancestors had long been resident at adjoining Chieveley in the same county.

== Early career ==
George Pocock entered the navy in 1718, serving aboard HMS Superb under the patronage of his maternal uncle, Captain Streynsham Master (1682–1724). He became lieutenant in April 1725 and commander in 1733. In 1738 he was promoted to post-captain and granted command of the 20-gun HMS Aldborough. After serving in the West Indies he was sent to join the Commander-in-Chief, East Indies, Rear-Admiral Charles Watson, in 1754 as captain of the 58-gun HMS Cumberland. Watson's squadron co-operated with Clive in the conquest of Bengal. In 1755 Pocock became rear-admiral, and was promoted to vice-admiral in 1756.

== Command of British naval forces in Indian waters ==
On the death of Watson in 1757 Pocock took the command of the naval forces in the East Indies. In 1758 he was joined by Commodore Charles Steevens (d. 1761), but the reinforcement only raised the squadron to seven small line-of-battle ships. War being now in progress between France and England the French sent a naval force from their islands in the Indian Ocean into the Bay of Bengal to the assistance of Pondicherry. To intercept the arrival of these reinforcements for the enemy now became the object of Pocock. The French force was indeed of less intrinsic strength than his own. Comte D'Aché who commanded it had to make up his line by including several Indiamen which were only armed merchant ships. Yet the number of the French was superior and Pocock was required by the practice of his time to fight by the old official fighting instructions. He had to bring his ships into action in a line with the enemy, and to preserve his formation while the engagement lasted.

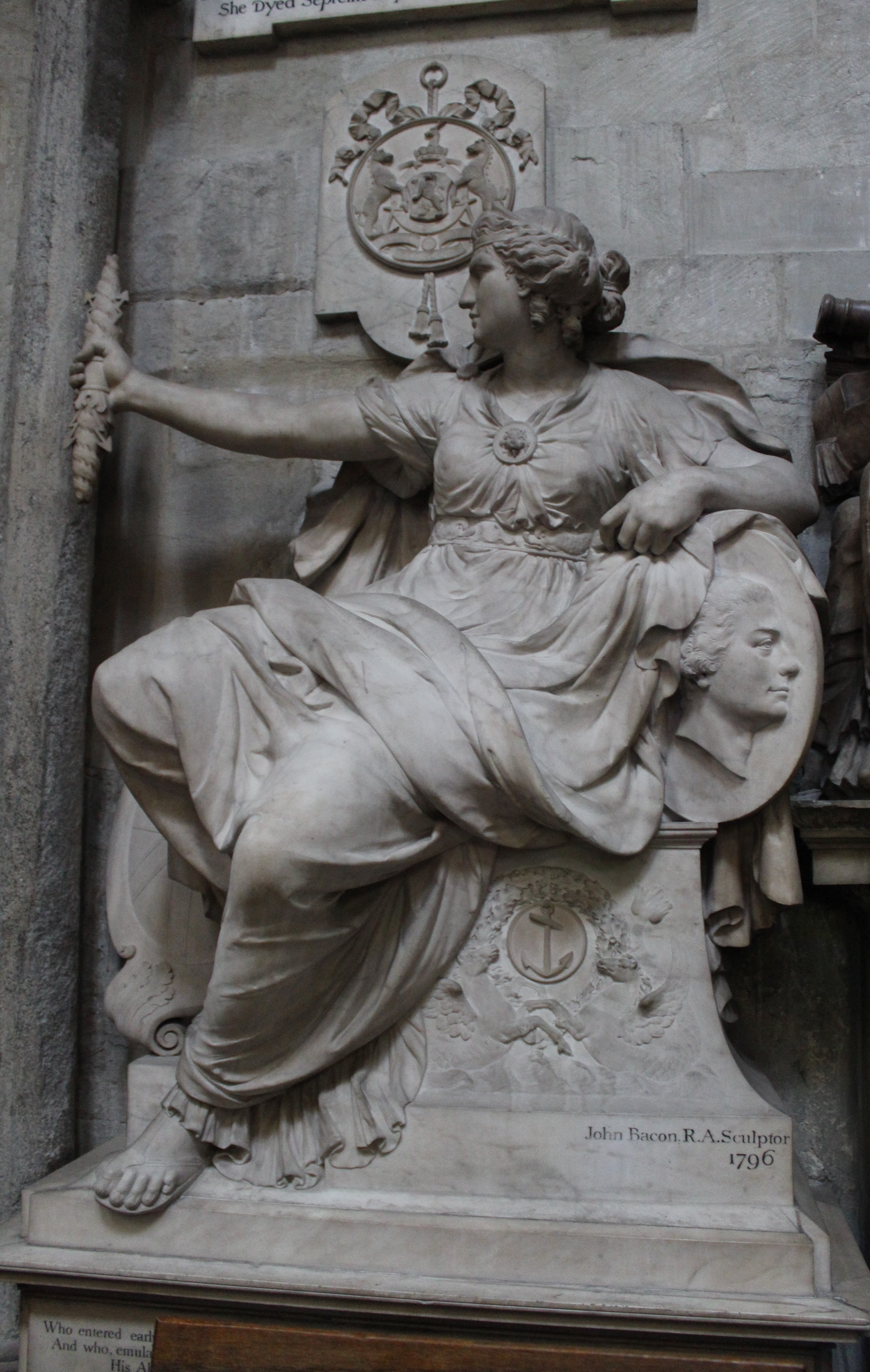
Pocock's memorial in Westminster Abbey

All Pocock's encounters with D'Aché were indecisive. The first battle, on 29 April 1758, failed to prevent the Frenchmen from reaching Pondicherry. After a second and more severe engagement on 3 August, the French admiral returned to Mauritius, and when the monsoon set in Pocock went round to Bombay. He was back early in spring, relieving the Siege of Madras, but the French admiral did not return to the Bay of Bengal until September. Again Pocock was unable to prevent his opponent from reaching Pondicherry, and a well-contested battle between them on 10 September 1759 proved again indecisive. The French government was nearly bankrupt, and D'Aché could get no stores for his squadron. He was compelled to return to the islands, and the British were left in possession of the Coromandel and Malabar Coasts. Pocock went home in 1760, and in 1761 was made a Knight of the Bath and admiral.

== Later career ==
In 1762 he was appointed to the command of the naval forces in the combined expedition which took Havana. The siege, which began on 7 June and lasted until 13 August, was rendered deadly by the climate. The final victory was largely attributable to the vigorous and intelligent aid which Pocock gave to the troops. His share in the prize money was no less than £122,697. On his return to England Pocock is said to have been disappointed because another officer, Sir Charles Saunders, was chosen in preference to himself as a member of the Admiralty Board, and to have resigned in consequence. It is certain that he resigned his commission in 1766. His memorial in Westminster Abbey, a statue of Britannia holding a thunderbolt, is by John Bacon and was erected in 1796.

In 1763 Pocock married Sophia Dent (1733–1767), the widow of his friend Commodore Digby Dent, daughter of George Francis Drake of Madras and step-daughter of George Morton Pitt who had inherited Pitt's house at Twickenham now known as Orleans House. Their son George (1765-1840) who married Charlotte Mary, daughter of Edward Long (historian), was created a baronet and their daughter Sophia (died 1811) married John 4th Earl Powlett.

== Sources ==
- Laughton, John Knox (1896). "Pocock, George" . In Lee, Sidney (ed.). Dictionary of National Biography. Vol. 46. London: Smith, Elder & Co.
- Pocock, Tom. "Pocock, Sir George (1706–1792)". Oxford Dictionary of National Biography (online ed.). Oxford University Press. doi:10.1093/ref:odnb/22421. (Subscription, Wikipedia Library access or UK public library membership required.)
