= Pondi =

Pondi may refer to:

- Murray cod, an Australian predatory freshwater fish
- Pondi language of Papua New Guinea
- Paul Pondi, Cameroonian politician
- Julius Gbabojor Pondi, Nigerian politician
- Puducherry (disambiguation) or Pondicherry, a union territory and city in India, often shortened to Pudu or Pondi
- Western Sydney Lakes, a lake in Sydney, Australia that features the artificial Pondi Beach

== See also ==
- Pudu (disambiguation)
