= Pudu, Dakshina Kannada =

- city
- Location in Karnataka, India
- Coordinates: 12.88°N 74.97°E
- Country: India
- State: Karnataka
- District: Dakshina Kannada

Population (2001)
  - Total: 12,409

Languages
  - Official: Kannada
- Time zone: UTC+5:30 (IST)

Pudu is a census town in Dakshina Kannada district in the Indian state of Karnataka.

== Demographics ==
As of 2001 Indian census, Pudu had a population of 12,409. Males and females each constitute 50% of the population. Pudu has an average literacy rate of 69%, higher than the national average of 59.5%: male literacy is 76%, and female literacy is 61%. In Pudu, 15% of the population is under 6 years of age.
