= Battle of Negapatam (1758) =

1758 battle of the Seven Years' War

Coordinates: 10.766667°N 79.833333°E

- Part of the Seven Years' War
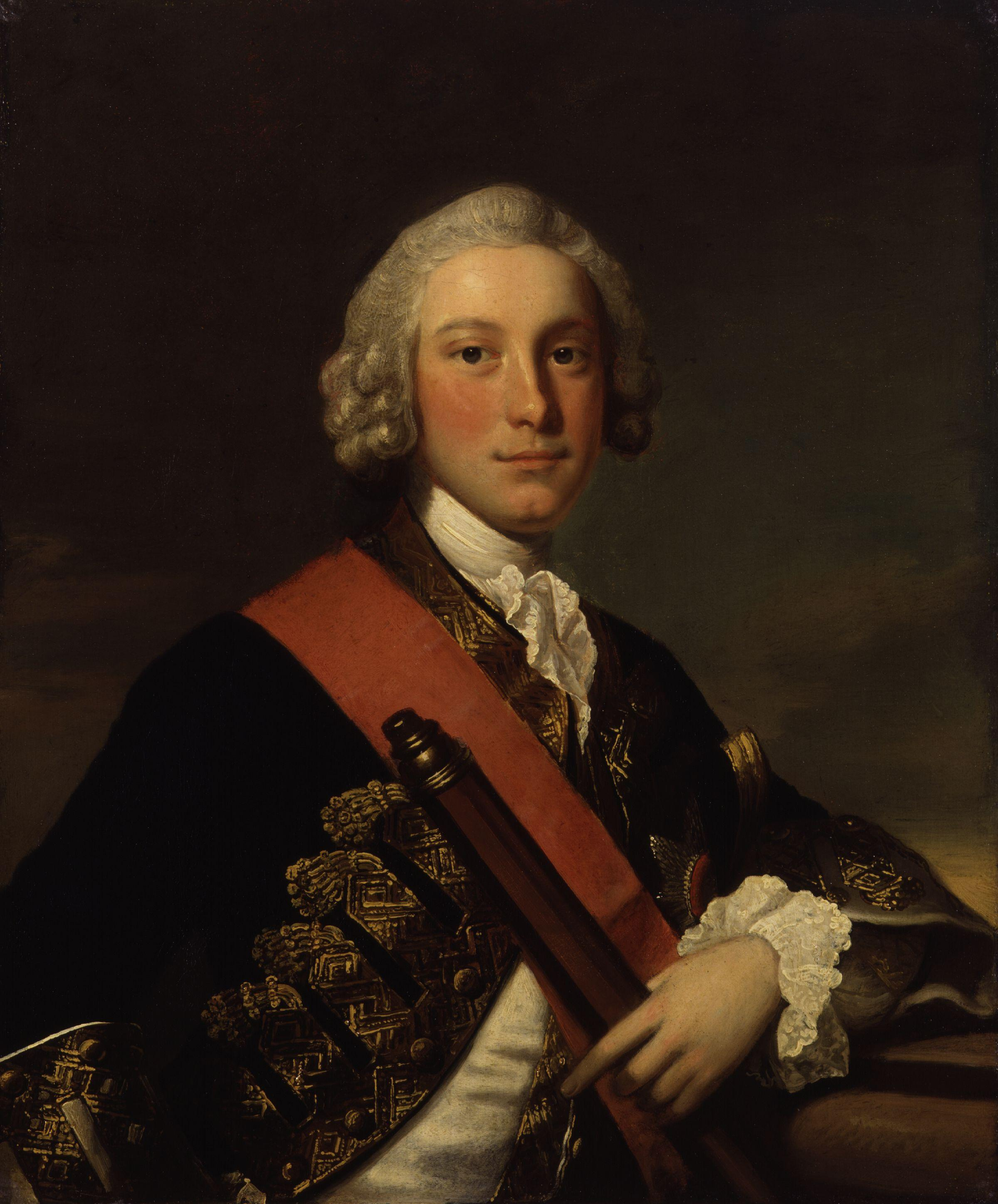
- Portrait of George Pocock
| Date | 3 August 1758 |
| Location | Off Negapatam, Indian Ocean |
| Result | Inconclusive |

Belligerents
| Great Britain | France |

Commanders and leaders
| George Pocock | Comte d'Aché (WIA) |

Strength
| 7 ships of the line 1 frigate | 8 ships of the line 1 frigate |

Casualties and losses
| 31 killed 166 wounded | 250 killed 600 wounded |

The Battle of Nagapatam was an indecisive naval battle on 3 August 1758 during the Seven Years' War. A British squadron under Vice-Admiral George Pocock fought a French squadron under Comte d'Aché off the Carnatic coast of India near Negapatam in the second of three battles fought between the two admirals during the war. Both squadrons suffered heavy damage during the short but fierce engagement, with d'Ache's flagship Zodiaque catching fire and d'Ache himself severely wounded. He would spend the remainder of the year recovering in Mauritius.

British order of battle
| Ship | Guns | Commander | Ref. |
|---|---|---|---|
| Yarmouth | 64 | Vice-Admiral George Pocock; Captain John Harrison | |
| Elizabeth | 64 | Commodore Charles Steevens; Captain Richard Kempenfelt | |
| Tiger | 60 | Captain Thomas Latham | |
| Weymouth | 60 | Captain John Stukley Somerset | |
| Cumberland | 56 | Captain William Martin | |
| Salisbury | 50 | Captain William Brereton | |
| Newcastle | 50 | Captain James Colville | |
| Queenborough | 24 | Captain Digby Dent | |

French order of battle
| Ship | Guns | Commander | Ref. |
|---|---|---|---|
| Zodiaque | 74 | Chef d'escadre Anne Antoine, Comte d'Aché; Captain Jacques-Antoine de Gotho | |
| Comte de Provence | 74 | Captain Jean-Jacques de La Chaise | |
| Saint Louis | 64 | Captain Louis de Joannis | |
| Vengeur | 64 | Captain Jean Baptiste Christy de La Pallière | |
| Duc d'Orléans | 60 | Captain Jean-François de Surville | |
| Duc de Bourgogne | 80 | Captain Jean-Baptiste d’Après de Mannevillette | |
| Condé | 50 | Captain Jacques Kerlero de Rosbo | |
| Moras | 50 | Captain Louis-Toussaint de Becdelièvre-Du Bouexié | |
| Diligente | 24 | Captain Marc-Joseph Marion du Fresne | |
