= Marbeuf =

- Commune
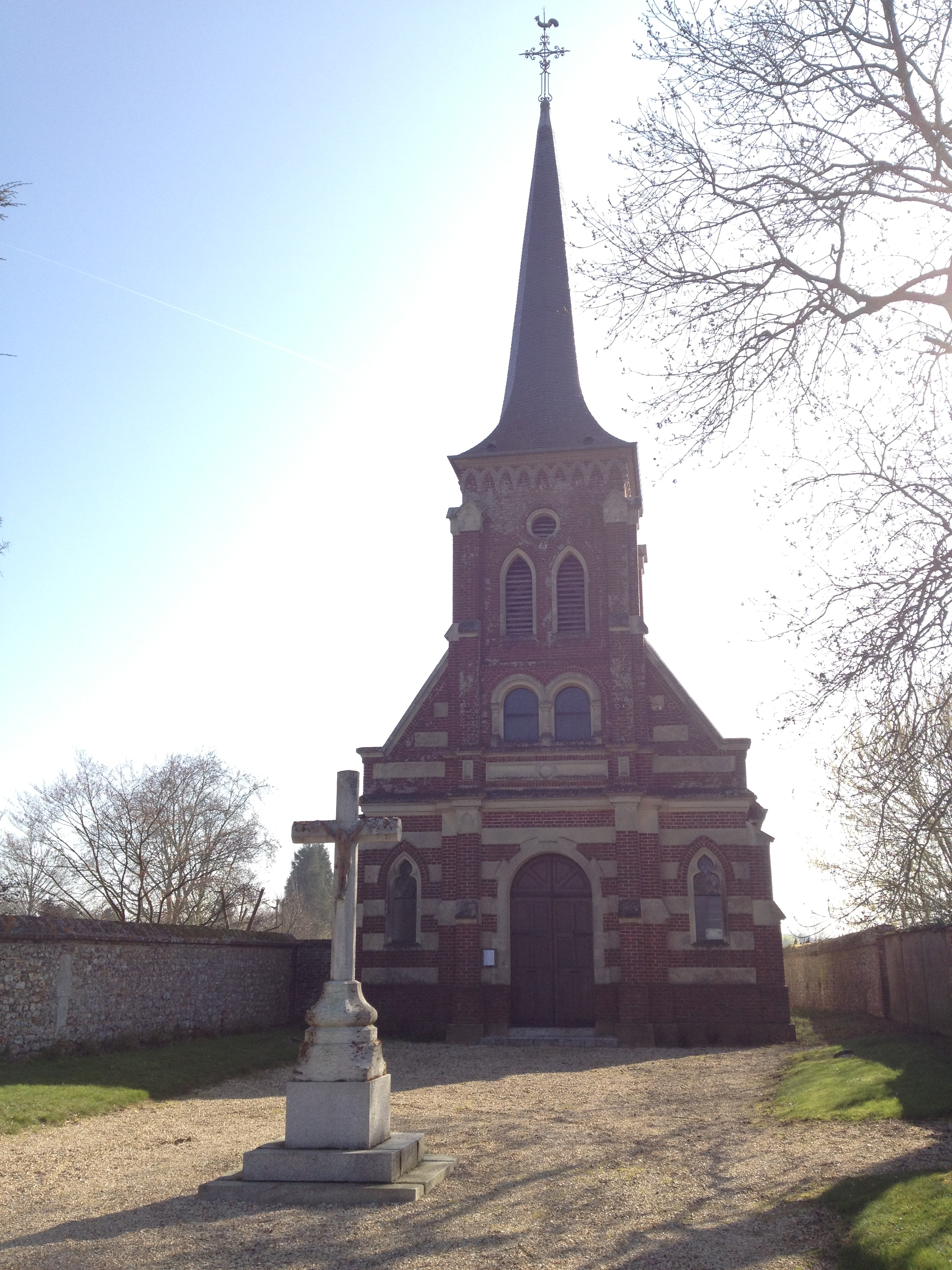
- The church in Marbeuf

- Coat of arms
- Location of Marbeuf
- Location within France Location within Normandy
- Coordinates: 49°09′13″N 0°58′04″E
- Country: France
- Region: Normandy
- Department: Eure
- Arrondissement: Bernay
- Canton: Le Neubourg

Government
  - Mayor (2020–2026): Bertrand Carpentier
- Area^{1}: 8.48 km^{2} (3.27 sq mi)
- Elevation: 151 m (495 ft)
- Highest elevation: 154 m (505 ft)
- Lowest elevation: 136 m (446 ft)
- Population (2023): 491
  - Density: 57.9/km^{2} (150/sq mi)
- Time zone: UTC+01:00 (CET)
  - Summer (DST): UTC+02:00 (CEST)
- INSEE/Postal code: 27389 /27110
- ^{1} French Land Register data, which excludes lakes, ponds, glaciers > 1 km^{2} (0.386 sq mi or 247 acres) and river estuaries.

Marbeuf (French pronunciation: [maʁbœf]) is a commune in the Eure department in Normandy in northern France.

== Population ==
Historical population
Year	Pop.	±% p.a.
1968	208	—
1975	233	+1.63%
1982	263	+1.75%
1990	258	−0.24%
1999	296	+1.54%
2007	341	+1.78%
2012	406	+3.55%
2017	461	+2.57%
2023	491	+1.06%
Source: INSEE

== See also ==
- Communes of the Eure department
