= Thomas Pocock (clergyman) =

English priest

Thomas Pocock FRS (1672–1745) was an English diarist, occupied as a member of the Anglican clergy. He was elected a Fellow of the Royal Society in 1727.

== Life ==
Pocock was born the son of Thomas Pocock and his wife, Anne, and grandson of the Rev. Dr. Laurence Pocock, Rector of Brightwalton in Berkshire, who, in turn, was probably a second cousin to Edward Pocock, the orientalist and biblical scholar. He was educated at Abingdon, and entered Pembroke College, Oxford, where he graduated B.A. in 1694. He was M.A. of St Mary Hall, Oxford in 1698.

He was chaplain to George Byng, 1st Viscount Torrington, his brother-in-law, on HMS Ranelagh, during the Battle of Málaga (1704), having previously served from May 1699 in HMS Orford. His journal relates mainly to this naval campaign; he served as naval chaplain again, in 1711, in HMS Union. Subsequently, Pocock was rector of Danbury in Essex, from 1705. He became rector of Latchingdon, in the same county, in 1712, and also chaplain to the Royal Hospital, Greenwich in Kent (now Greater London), from 1716.

== Works ==
- The Relief of Captives (1720), sermon
- An English translation of Menashe Ben Israel's De Termina Vitae "Of the Term of Life, whether it is fixed or alterable" (1709).
- Extracts from Pocock's journal were edited in 1889 by John Knox Laughton.

== Family ==
Pocock married Joyce, the daughter of James Master, who was a brother of Streynsham Master, the English East India Company pioneer. Pocock's master, Lord Torrington, married Joyce's sister, Margaret. Pocock had nine children, including Admiral Sir George Pocock K.B., Lieut. Richard Pocock R.N., Sarah the wife of Capt. Philip Vincent R.N. and Beatrice the wife of the Rev. David Campbell, Chaplain to Greenwich Hospital.
