= French ship Actif (1752) =

Ship of the line of the French Navy

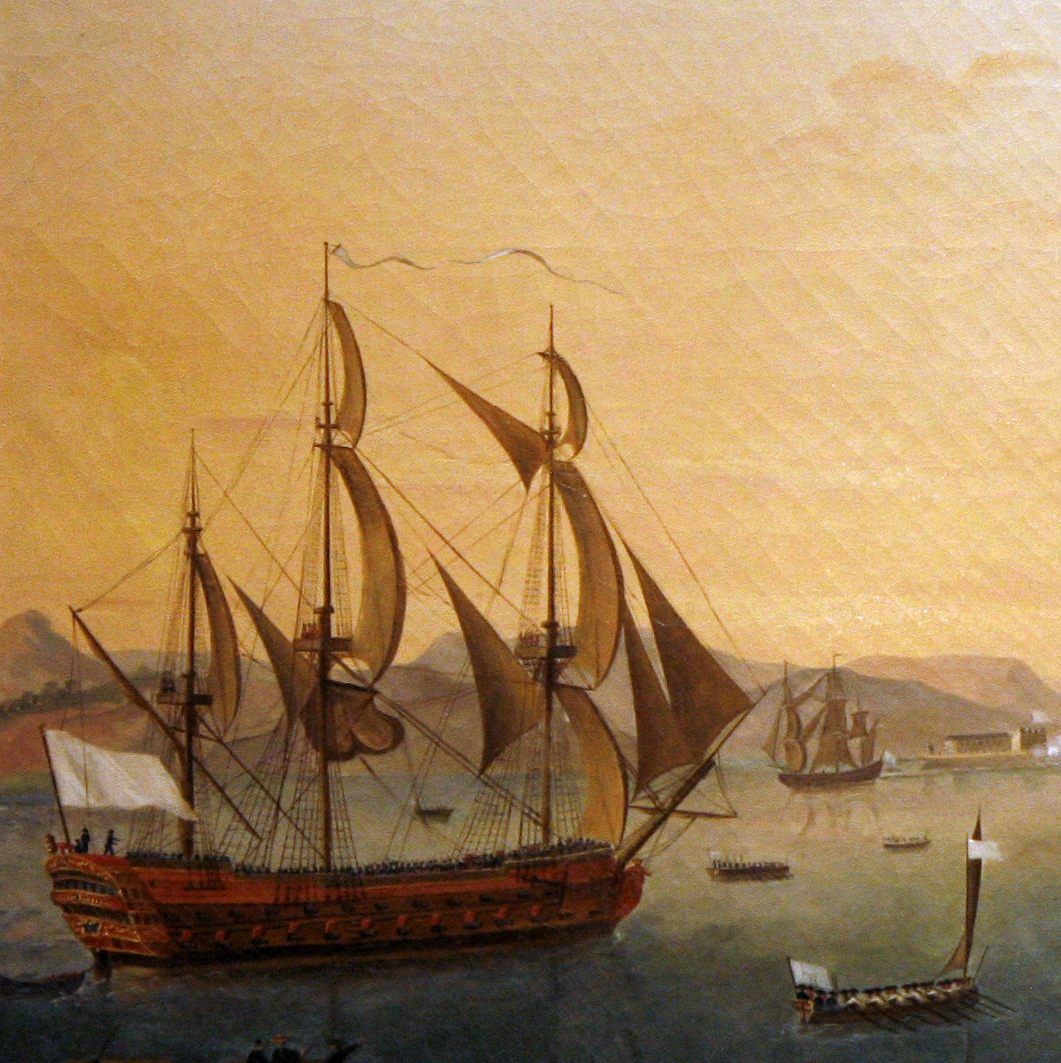
- A 64-gun ship of the same type as the Actif

History

France
- Name: Actif
- Builder: P. Salinoc
- Laid down: 14 November 1750
- Launched: 15 December 1752
- Commissioned: 1752
- Decommissioned: 1766
- Honours and awards: Battle of Pondicherry

General characteristics
- Armament: 64 guns

Actif was a 64-gun ship of the line in the French Navy between 1752 and 1766.

She was built by P. Salinoc at Brest – she was laid down on 14 November 1750 and launched on 15 December 1752. She was initially commanded by captain de Caumont on the Canadian campaign, forming part of Dubois de La Motte's fleet in May 1755. At the start of the Seven Years' War. She was converted to a troop transport and reduced to 22 guns, taking nine companies of the régiment de Languedoc. On 11 September 1759 she fought at the Battle of Pondicherry. She left the fleet in 1766.

== Bibliography ==
- Michel Vergé-Franceschi (ed.), Dictionnaire d'Histoire maritime, éditions Robert Laffont, coll. « Bouquins », 2002
