= Battle of Pondicherry =

1759 naval battle of the Seven Years' War in India

Coordinates: 11°56′N 79°50′E

- Part of the Seven Years' War
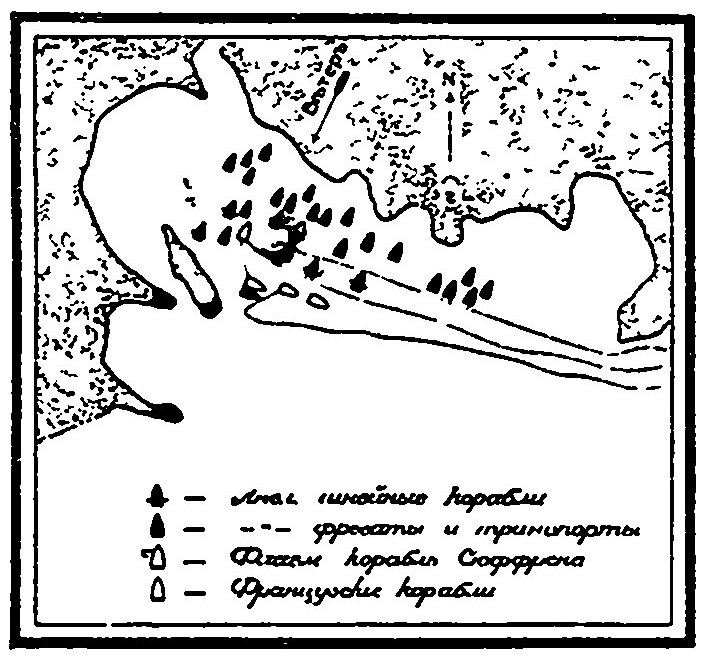
- Map of the battle
Date	10 September 1759
Location	Off Pondicherry, Indian Ocean
Result	Inconclusive

Belligerents
Great Britain	France

Commanders and leaders
George Pocock	Comte d'Aché

Strength
9 ships of the line 1 frigate	11 ships of the line 2 frigates

Casualties and losses
184 killed 385 wounded	1,500 killed or wounded

The Battle of Pondicherry was a naval battle between a British squadron under Vice-Admiral George Pocock and French squadron under Comte d'Aché on 10 September 1759 off the Carnatic coast of India near Pondicherry during the Seven Years' War. Pocock attempted to intercept d'Aché, whose squadron was carrying reinforcements and money for the French forces in Pondicherry. The battle was indecisive, but d'Aché successfully completed his mission when his fleet arrived in Pondicherry on 15 September. However, these forces were insufficient to reverse the declining French situation in the Carnatic.

== Aftermath ==
Although the battle was indecisive, d'Aché's squadron survived the engagement without losing any ships and continued on to Pondicherry, reaching the city on 15 September. The battle could therefore be considered a tactical French victory, as the French squadron managed to achieve its objective of resupplying the French successfully. However, although the convoy had delivered a large amount of money to fund the French war effort, the number of troops that the squadron brought were not enough to effectively challenge Britain's growing pre-eminence on the subcontinent. This was compounded by the French governor-general Comte de Lally's strong antipathy towards the Indian people, and his refusal to use sepoys to augment his forces as the British had.

By 1759, the war in India had shifted in Britain's favour but the outcome of the war was by no means decided. However, as the war continued, Britain's strength on the subcontinent grew thanks to the arrival of significant numbers of reinforcements coupled with the recruitment of local sepoys. From 1760 onwards, Britain would begin to reconquer territories that had been lost in the Carnatic earlier in the war, and laid siege to Pondicherry by March. Despite a lengthy and brave defence, the city fell on 15 January 1761 and remained under British control until the Treaty of Paris was signed in 1763, when the city was returned to France.

== Order of battle ==
=== British ===
Ship	Guns	Commander	Notes	Ref.
HMS Elizabeth	64	Captain Richard Tiddeman		
HMS Newcastle	50	Captain Colin Michie †		
HMS Tiger	60	Captain William Brereton		
HMS Grafton	68	Rear-Admiral Charles Steevens; Captain Richard Kempenfelt		
HMS Yarmouth	66	Vice-Admiral George Pocock; Captain John Harrison		
HMS Cumberland	58	Captain John Stukley Somerset	Reduced from 66 guns to ease her	
HMS Salisbury	50	Captain Digby Dent		
HMS Sunderland	60	Captain James Colville		
HMS Weymouth	60	Captain Sir William Baird		
HMS Queenborough	24	Captain Robert Kirk	Not in line of battle	

=== French ===
Ship	Guns	Commander	Notes	Ref.
Actif	64	Captain Michel-Joseph Froger de l'Éguille		
Minotaure	74	Captain Anne Marie Charles de la Bourdonnaye		
Duc d'Orlèans	60	Captain Jean-François de Surville		
Saint Louis	60			
Vengeur	64	Captain Jean Baptiste Christy de La Pallière		
Zodiaque	74	Lieutenant-General Anne Antoine, Comte d'Aché; Captain Jacques-Antoine de Gotho †		
Comte de Provence	74	Captain Jean-Jacques de La Chaise		
Duc de Bourgogne	80	Captain René Joseph Bouvet de Précourt		
Illustre	64	Captain Jacques de Ruis-Embito		
Fortune	64			
Centaure	70	Captain Robert René Louis de Surville †		
Sylphide	36	Captain François-Aymar de Monteil	Not in line of battle	
Diligente	24	Captain Marc-Joseph Marion du Fresne	Not in line of battle	
