= HMS Grafton (1750) =

Ship of the line of the Royal Navy

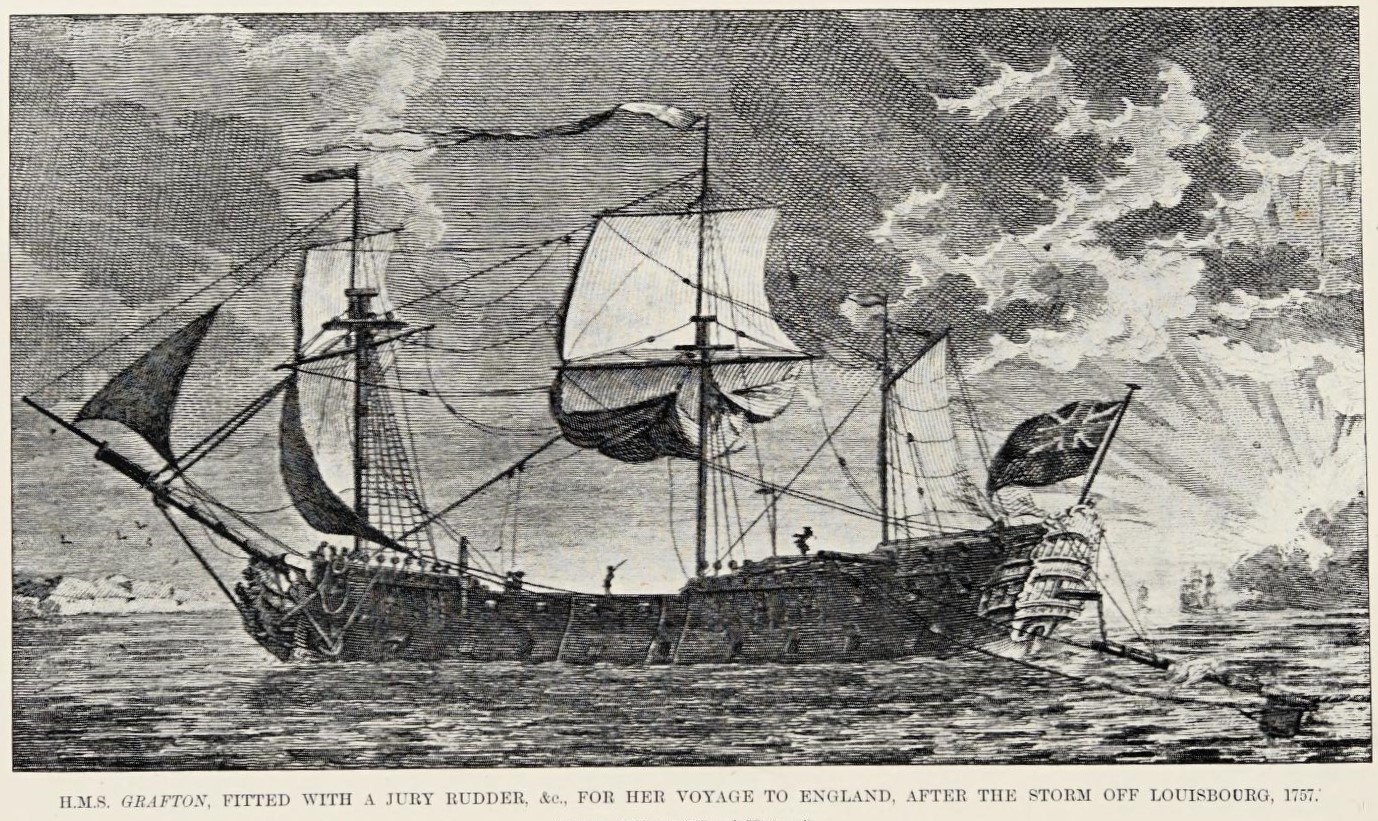
- "HMS Grafton after the storm off Louisbourg, 1757."

History

Great Britain
- Name: HMS Grafton
- Ordered: 28 August 1744 & 6 August 1745
- Builder: Peirson Lock, Portsmouth Dockyard
- Laid down: 11 September 1745
- Launched: 29 March 1750
- Commissioned: February 1755
- In service: 1755–1763
- Fate: Sold at Chatham Dockyard, 1767

General characteristics
- Class & type: 1745 Establishment 70-gun third rate ship of the line
- Tons burthen: 1,414 56/94(bm)
- Length: 160 ft 0 in (48.8 m) (gundeck); 131 ft 4 in (40.0 m) (keel)
- Beam: 45 ft 4 in (13.8 m)
- Depth of hold: 19 ft 4 in (5.9 m)
- Propulsion: Sails
- Sail plan: Full-rigged ship
- Complement: 520
- Armament: 70 guns: Gundeck: 26 × 32-pounder guns; Upper deck: 28 × 18-pounder guns; Quarterdeck: 12 × 9-pounder guns; Forecastle: 4 × 9-pounder guns

HMS Grafton was a 70-gun third-rate ship of the line of the Royal Navy, built at Portsmouth Dockyard to the draught specified by the 1745 Establishment, and launched on 29 March 1750. The ship served in the failed Louisbourg Expedition (1757).

== Naval career ==
Grafton was commissioned in February 1755 under Captain Charles Holmes, in the months immediately before the commencement of the Seven Years' War. On 11 May 1755 she was assigned as a reinforcement for the British fleet commanded by Admiral Edward Boscawen, and sailed for North America when war was formally declared in 1756.

Grafton served until 1767, when she was sold out of the Navy.

== Bibliography ==
- Winfield, Rif (2007). British Warships of the Age of Sail 1714–1792: Design, Construction, Careers and Fates. Barnsley, United Kingdom: Seaforth. ISBN 9781844157006.
