= HMS Weymouth (1752) =

Ship of the line of the Royal Navy

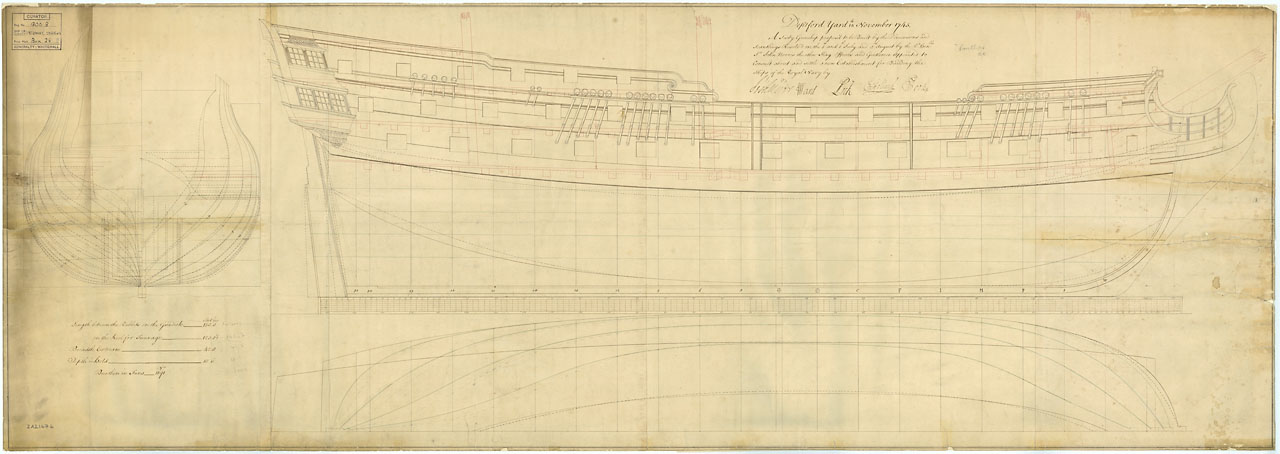
- Weymouth

History

Great Britain
- Name: HMS Weymouth
- Builder: Plymouth Dockyard
- Launched: 18 February 1752
- Fate: Broken up, 1772

General characteristics
- Class & type: 1745 Establishment 60-gun fourth rate ship of the line
- Tons burthen: 1198
- Length: 150 ft (45.7 m) (gundeck)
- Beam: 42 ft 8 in (13.0 m)
- Depth of hold: 18 ft 6 in (5.6 m)
- Propulsion: Sails
- Sail plan: Full-rigged ship
- Armament: 60 guns: Gundeck: 24 × 24 pdrs; Upper gundeck: 26 × 18 pdrs; Quarterdeck: 8 × 6 pdrs; Forecastle: 2 × 6 pdrs

HMS Weymouth was a 60-gun fourth rate ship of the line of the Royal Navy, built at Plymouth Dockyard to the draught specified by the 1745 Establishment, and launched on 18 February 1752.

Weymouth served until 1772, when the decision was taken to have her broken up.
