= Siege of Pondicherry (1760) =

Conflict in the Seven Years' War

- Part of the Third Carnatic War
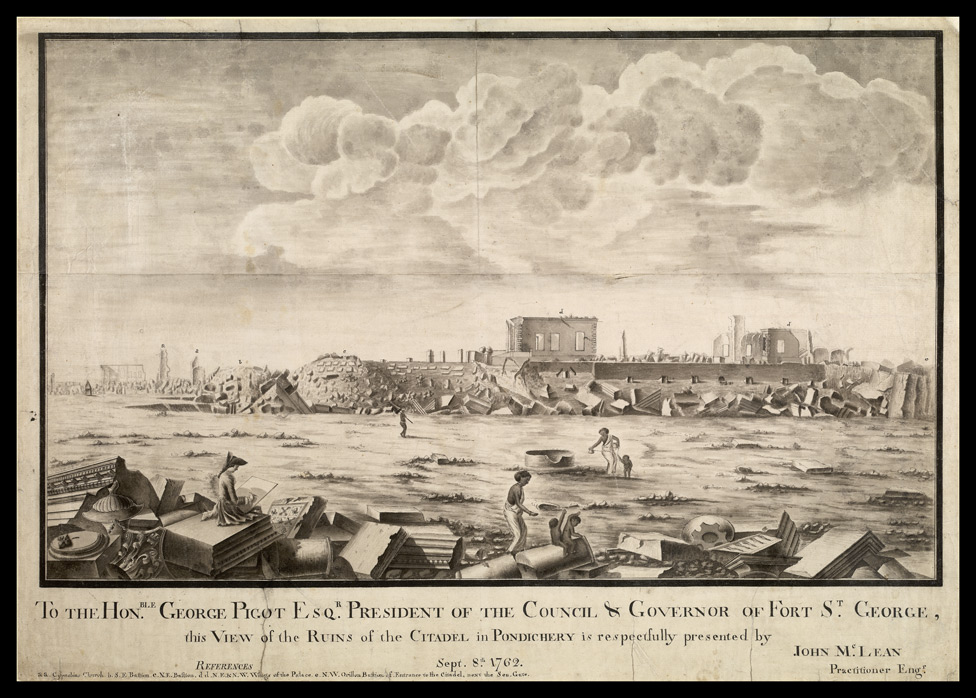
- The demolished citadel after the siege
Date	4 September 1760 – 15 January 1761
Location	Pondicherry, India 11°56′N 79°50′E
Result	British victory

Belligerents
Great Britain: East India Company	France: French East India Company

Commanders and leaders
Eyre Coote	Thomas Arthur (surrendered)
- Location within Puducherry Siege of Pondicherry (1760) (India)

The siege of Pondicherry (1760–1761) was a conflict in the Third Carnatic War, as part of the global Seven Years' War. Lasting from 4 September 1760 to 15 January 1761, British land and naval forces besieged and eventually compelled the French garrison defending the French colonial outpost of Pondicherry to surrender. The city was running low on supplies and ammunitions when French commander Lally surrendered. It was the third British victory in the region that was under the command of Robert Clive.

== See also ==
- Battle of Pondicherry
