= Anne Antoine, Comte d'Aché =

Vice Admiral of France

- Born: 23 January 1701; Marbeuf, France
- Died: 11 February 1780 (aged 79); Brest, France
- Military career
- Allegiance: Kingdom of France
- Branch: (Kingdom of France) French Royal Navy
- Unit: Vice admiral
- Conflicts: Seven Years' War; Battle of Cuddalore; Battle of Negapatam; Battle of Pondicherry

Anne Antoine, Comte d’Aché (French pronunciation: [an ɑ̃twan daʃe]; 23 January 1701, Marbeuf – 11 February 1780) was a French naval officer who rose to the rank of vice admiral. He is best known for his service off the coast of India during the Seven Years' War, when he led the French fleet at the Battle of Cuddalore and Battle of Pondicherry. He also failed to provide adequate naval support to French troops attempting to capture Madras in 1759. After he received rumours of a British attack on the major Indian Ocean naval base Mauritius he did not go to the aid of the French forces in Pondicherry which was under siege. Pondicherry, the French capital in India, subsequently surrendered leaving the French with no influence upon the Indian subcontinent. After the war he retired to Brest where he died in 1780.

== See also ==
- France in the Seven Years' War
- Great Britain in the Seven Years' War
