= HMS Tiger (1747) =

Ship of the line of the Royal Navy

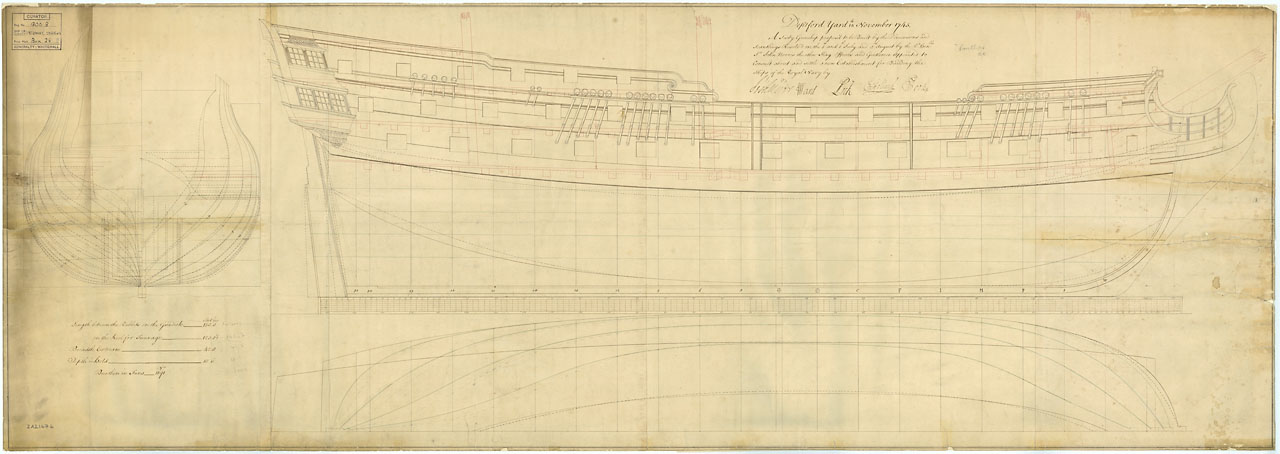
- Tiger

History

Great Britain
- Name: HMS Tiger
- Ordered: 17 March 1746
- Builder: Stanton and Wells, Rotherhithe
- Laid down: April 1746
- Launched: 23 November 1747
- Commissioned: December 1747
- In service: 1747–1752; 1753–1765
- Honours and awards: Battle of Chandannagar (1757); Battle of Cuddalore (1758); Battle of Negapatam (1758); Battle of Pondicherry (1759)
- Fate: Sold out of service, Bombay, 12 May 1765

General characteristics
- Class & type: 1745 Establishment 60-gun fourth rate ship of the line
- Tons burthen: 1,218 15/94 bm
- Length: 150 ft 9 in (45.9 m) (gundeck); 123 ft 3 in (37.6 m)
- Beam: 43 ft 1 in (13.1 m)
- Depth of hold: 18 ft 6 in (5.6 m)
- Sail plan: Full-rigged ship
- Complement: 420
- Armament: 60 guns: Gundeck: 24 × 24 pdrs; Upper gundeck: 26 × 18 pdrs; Quarterdeck: 8 × 6 pdrs; Forecastle: 2 × 6 pdrs

HMS Tiger or Tygre was a 60-gun fourth rate ship of the line of the Royal Navy, built at Rotherhithe to the draught specified by the 1745 Establishment and launched on 23 November 1747.

== Naval service ==
Tiger was commissioned in December 1747 under Captain Charles Saunders, as a reinforcement for the British fleet then in action against France in the War of the Austrian Succession. She was assigned to a squadron under the overall command of Admiral Peter Warren, but saw no active engagement in her first months at sea. The war ended with the signing of the Treaty of Aix-la-Chapelle in April 1748, and Tiger was returned to Deptford for service as a guard ship. Charles Steevens replaced Saunders as Tiger's captain in 1749, but the vessel remained at Deptford until she was decommissioned in November 1752.

Two months later, in January 1753, Tiger was restored to her duties as a guard ship but relocated to Portsmouth Dockyard. Command was transferred to Captain Samuel Marshall, and then to Captain Thomas Latham in early 1754. In early 1754 the vessel was assigned to the protection of British merchant interests in the East Indies.

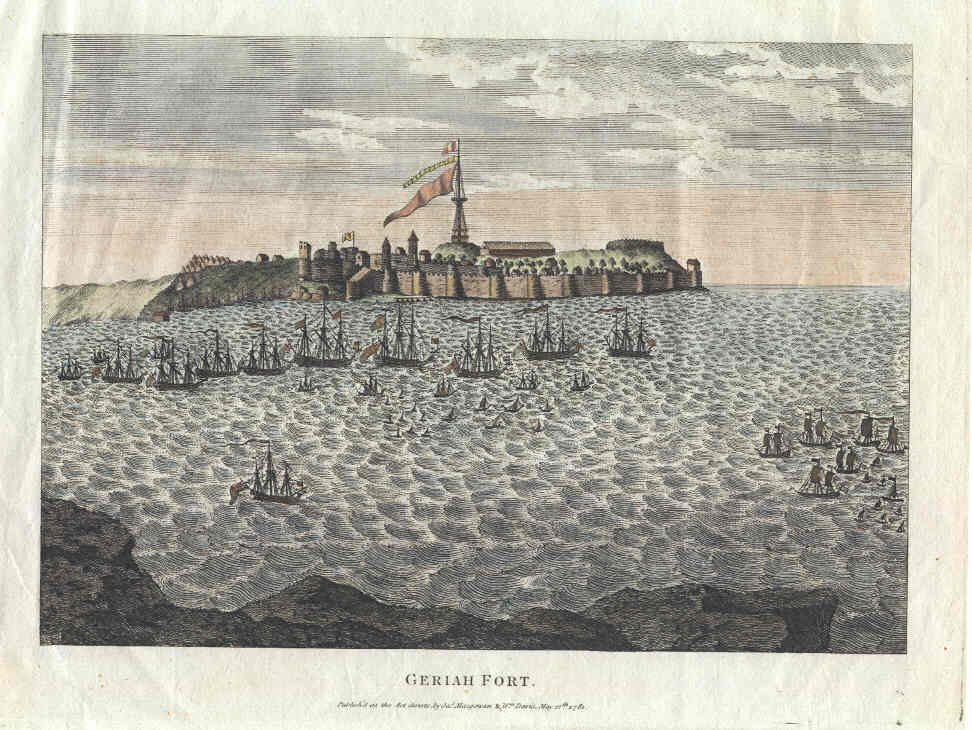
A British-Portuguese-Indian naval force attacks the fort of Geriah, 1756

In the British anti-piracy campaign of 1756 HMS Kent, Kingfisher, and Tiger carried 300 Indo-Portuguese Topazes to capture the fortress of Gheriah on 14 February 1756.

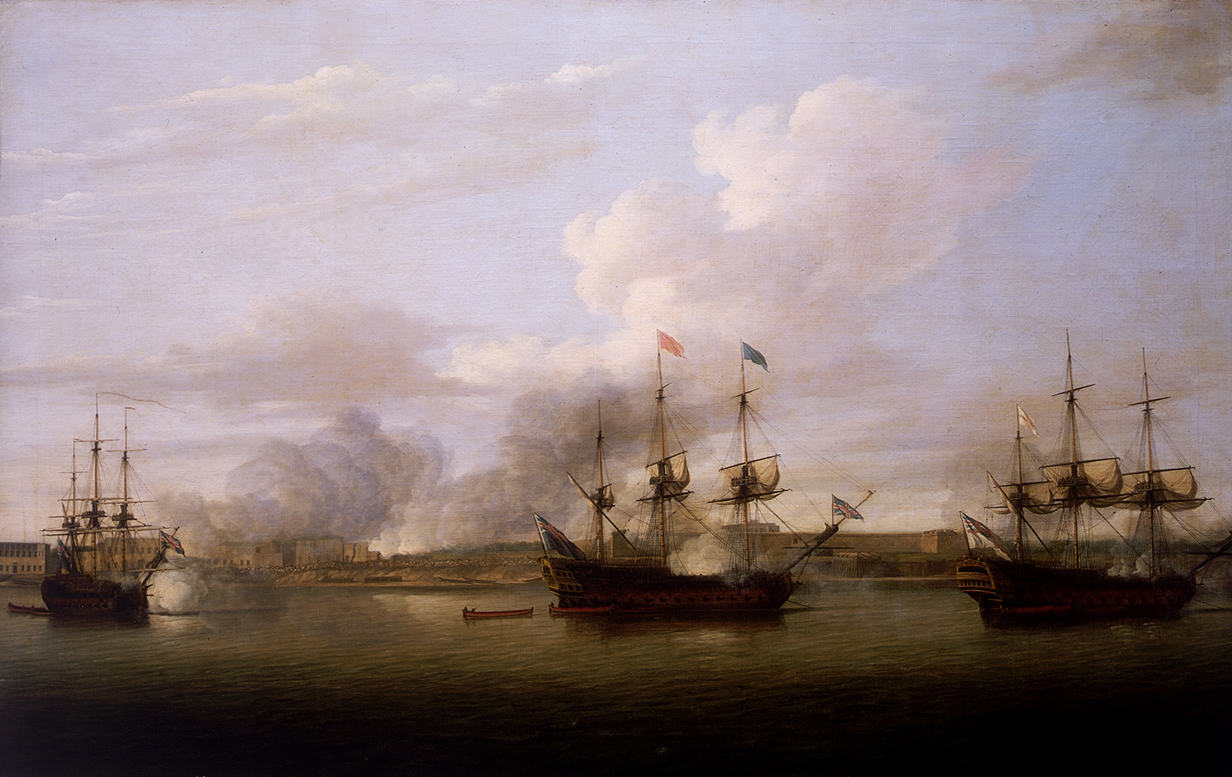
Tiger (far right) at the capture of Chandernagore, March 1757

In 1756 war broke out between France and Great Britain, and Colonel Robert Clive of the British East India Company and Admiral Charles Watson of the British Navy bombarded and captured Chandannagar on 23 March 1757. In order to take the Fort d'Orleans guarding the town, Tiger and Kent managed to edge up the Hooghly river, although the French had tried to block it with sunken ships, booms and chains. When they were close to the fort, they opened fire with all guns, but took a great punishment from the French in the process.

== Fate ==
Tiger was converted to serve as a hulk in 1760, and in 1765 she was sold out of the Navy.
