= Charles Steevens =

Royal Navy admiral

Rear-Admiral Charles Steevens
- Born: ca. 1705
- Died: 20 May 1761; Bombay, India
- Military career
- Allegiance: Kingdom of Great Britain
- Branch: Royal Navy
- Rank: Rear-Admiral
- Commands: HMS Cumberland; HMS Phaeton; HMS Ludlow Castle; HMS Portland; HMS Tiger; Leeward Islands; HMS Oxford; East Indies Station
- Conflicts: War of Jenkins' Ear; Seven Years' War

Rear-Admiral Charles Steevens (c. 1705 – 20 May 1761) was a Royal Navy officer who became Commander-in-Chief of the East Indies Station.

== Naval career ==
Born the fifth son of John Steevens, Steevens was promoted to lieutenant in the Royal Navy in 1729.

In 1738 as a lieutenant on HMS Falmouth he was involved in an incident whereby he insisted that Captain William Douglas, commanding officer of the ship, be confined in his cabin for the preservation of their lives, he being disordered in his senses: Steevens eventually gave Douglas a public apology and thereby avoided court martial.

He was given command of HMS Cumberland in 1741 and was present at the Battle of Cartagena de Indias in the Spring of that year. He went on to command HMS Phaeton later that year, HMS Ludlow Castle from 1742 and HMS Portland from 1744 (in which he was involved in the capture of three French ships). He briefly commanded HMS Tiger before becoming Commander-in-Chief of the Leeward Islands in HMS Lichfield in 1755. On return to England he was given command of HMS Oxford.

He became Commander-in-Chief of the East Indies Station in 1760 with the rank of commodore. Promoted rear-admiral of the blue, he organised the Naval siege of Pondicherry in September 1760, receiving their surrender in January 1761.

He died, unmarried, at Bombay on 20 May 1761.
