= HMS Cumberland (1710) =

Ship of the line of the Royal Navy

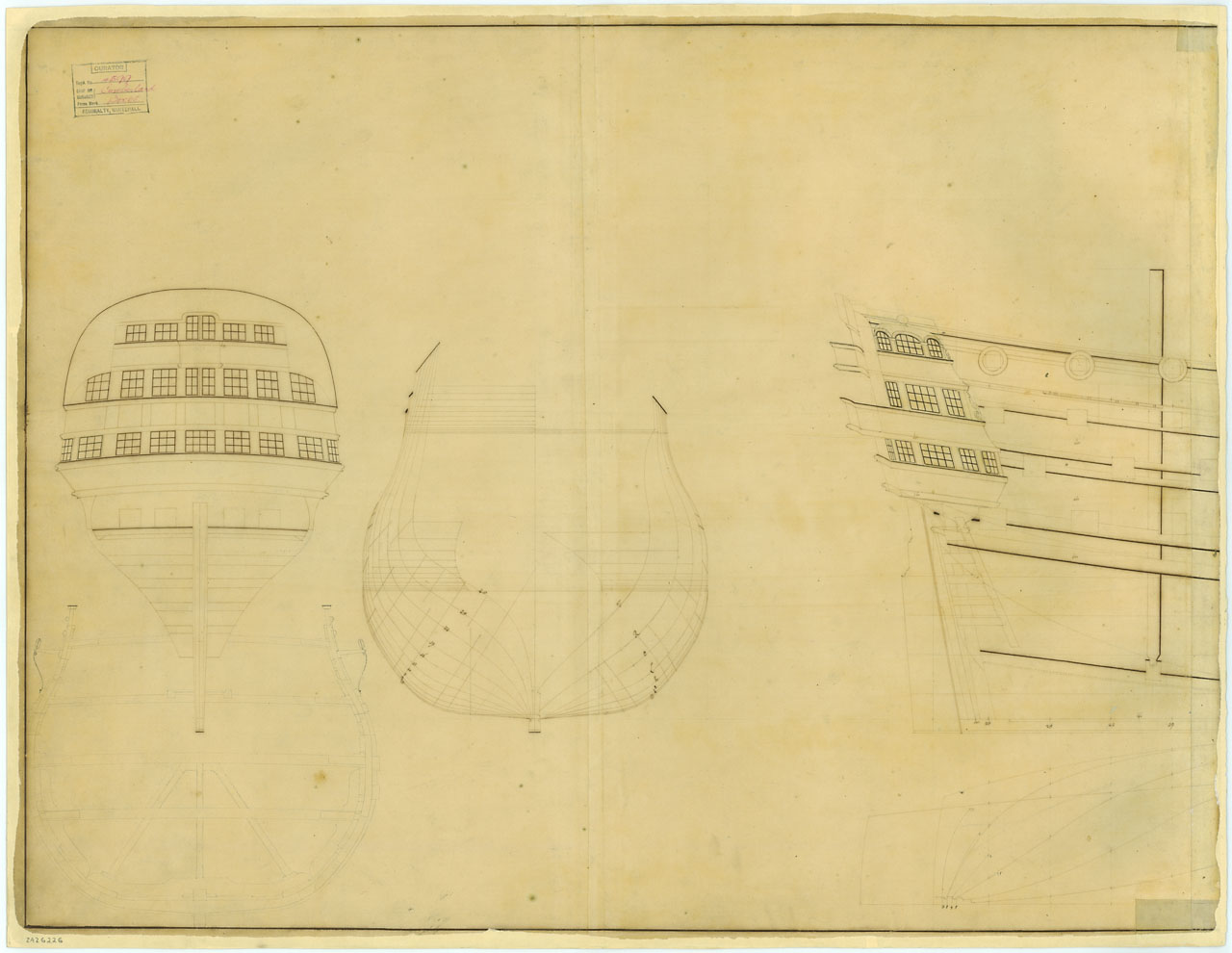
- Cumberland

History

Great Britain
- Name: HMS Cumberland
- Builder: Allin, Deptford Dockyard
- Launched: 27 December 1710
- Fate: Foundered, 1760

General characteristics as built
- Class & type: 1706 Establishment 80-gun third rate ship of the line
- Tons burthen: 1,308 tons BM
- Length: 156 ft (47.5 m) (gundeck)
- Beam: 43 ft 6 in (13.3 m)
- Depth of hold: 17 ft 8 in (5.4 m)
- Propulsion: Sails
- Sail plan: Full-rigged ship
- Armament: 80 guns: Gundeck: 26 × 32-pdrs; Middle gundeck: 26 × 12-pdrs; Upper gundeck: 24 × 6-pdrs; Quarterdeck: 4 × 6-pdrs

General characteristics after 1739 rebuild
- Class & type: 1733 proposals 80-gun third rate ship of the line
- Tons burthen: 1,401 tons BM
- Length: 158 ft (48.2 m) (gundeck)
- Beam: 45 ft 5 in (13.8 m)
- Depth of hold: 18 ft 7 in (5.7 m)
- Propulsion: Sails
- Sail plan: Full-rigged ship
- Armament: 80 guns of various weights of shot

HMS Cumberland was a three-deck 80-gun third rate ship of the line of the Royal Navy, built by Joseph Allin the elder at Deptford Dockyard and launched on 27 December 1710. Her design corresponded to that laid down by the 1706 Establishment of dimensions for 80-gun ships.

On 4 September 1733 she was ordered to be taken to pieces and rebuilt at Woolwich according to the 1733 proposals of the 1719 Establishment. She was relaunched on 11 July 1739. In 1747, she was reduced to a 56-gun ship.

Cumberland sank while anchored off the Indian port of Goa on the night of 2 November 1760. Her captain, Robert Kirk, faced a court martial for the loss of his ship, but was acquitted. The court found that Cumberland's sinking "proceeded from her being entirely decayed, and not in a condition to have proceeded to sea."
