= Løchen =

Løchen or Lochen is a surname. Notable people with the surname include:

- Antonie Løchen, Norwegian politician and women's rights activist
- Arne Løchen (1850–1930), Norwegian psychologist, philosopher and literary researcher
- Einar Løchen, Norwegian jurist and politician
- Einar Løchen (1918–2008), Norwegian judge
- Élisabeth Lochen, French film director
- Gudrun Løchen Drewsen, Norwegian-American women's rights activist
- Kalle Løchen (1865–1893), Norwegian painter and actor
- Peter Lochen, 19th century American politician
- Sissel Løchen, Norwegian wheelchair curler
- Thorvald Løchen, Norwegian civil servant and politician
- Yngvar Løchen, Norwegian sociologist
