= 1781 =

1781 in various calendars
- Gregorian calendar: 1781; MDCCLXXXI
- Ab urbe condita: 2534
- Armenian calendar: 1230; ԹՎ ՌՄԼ
- Assyrian calendar: 6531
- Balinese saka calendar: 1702–1703
- Bengali calendar: 1187–1188
- Berber calendar: 2731
- British Regnal year: 21 Geo. 3 – 22 Geo. 3
- Buddhist calendar: 2325
- Burmese calendar: 1143
- Byzantine calendar: 7289–7290
- Chinese calendar: 庚子年 (Metal Rat); 4478 or 4271 — to — 辛丑年 (Metal Ox); 4479 or 4272
- Coptic calendar: 1497–1498
- Discordian calendar: 2947
- Ethiopian calendar: 1773–1774
- Hebrew calendar: 5541–5542
- Hindu calendars
- Vikram Samvat: 1837–1838
- Shaka Samvat: 1702–1703
- Kali Yuga: 4881–4882
- Holocene calendar: 11781
- Igbo calendar: 781–782
- Iranian calendar: 1159–1160
- Islamic calendar: 1195–1196
- Japanese calendar: An'ei 10 / Tenmei 1 (天明元年)
- Javanese calendar: 1706–1707
- Julian calendar: Gregorian minus 11 days
- Korean calendar: 4114
- Minguo calendar: 131 before ROC 民前131年
- Nanakshahi calendar: 313
- Thai solar calendar: 2323–2324
- Tibetan calendar: ལྕགས་ཕོ་བྱི་བ་ལོ་ (male Iron-Rat); 1907 or 1526 or 754 — to — ལྕགས་མོ་གླང་ལོ་ (female Iron-Ox); 1908 or 1527 or 755

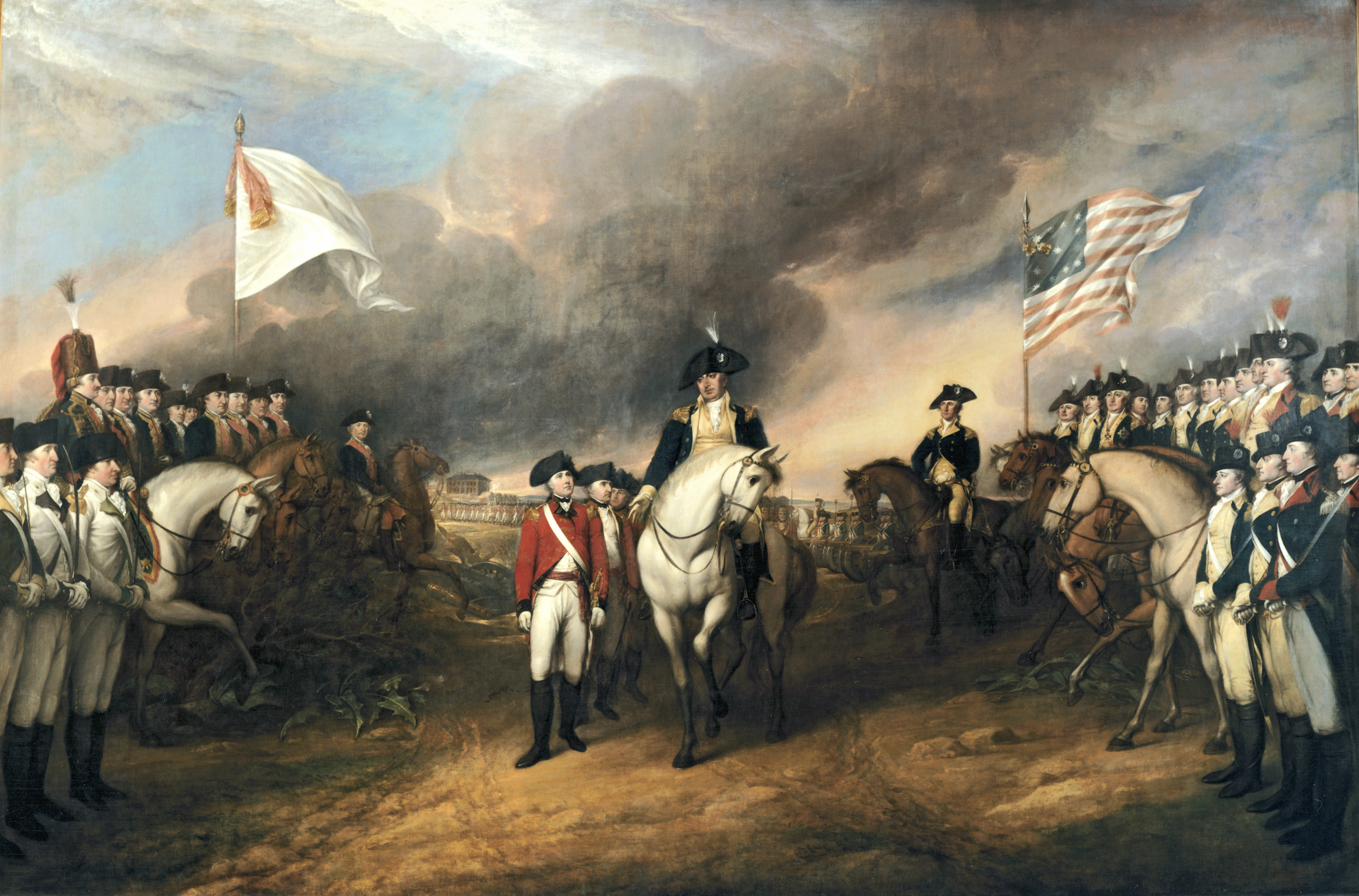
October 19: Britain's General Cornwallis surrenders to General Washington at Yorktown, conceding American victory in war.

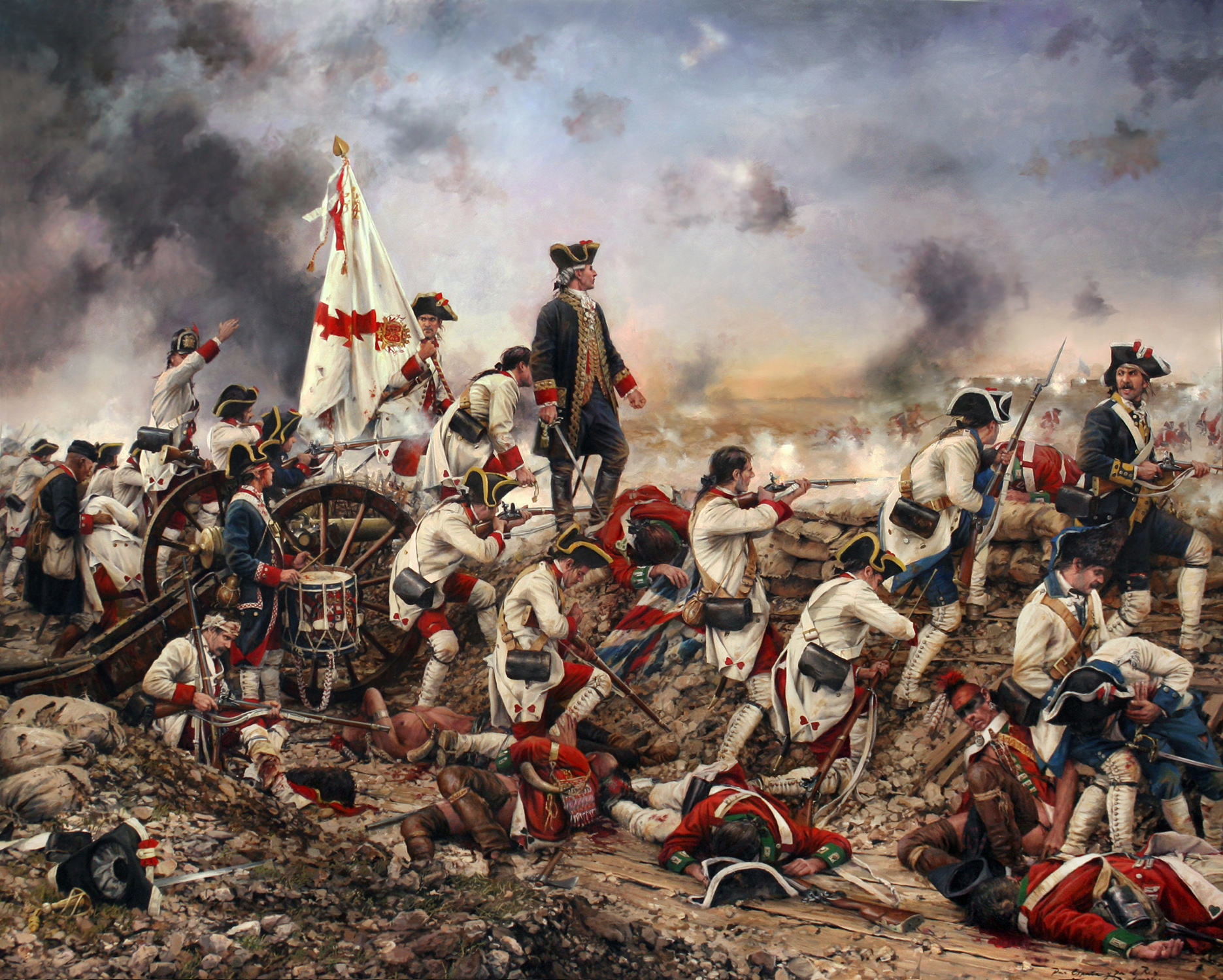
March 9: Siege of Pensacola

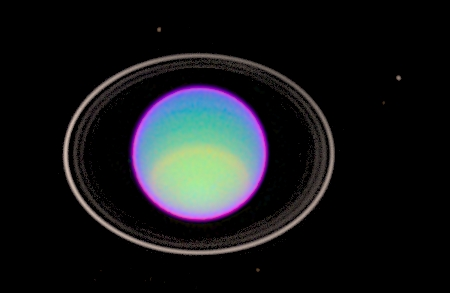
March 13: Uranus is discovered.

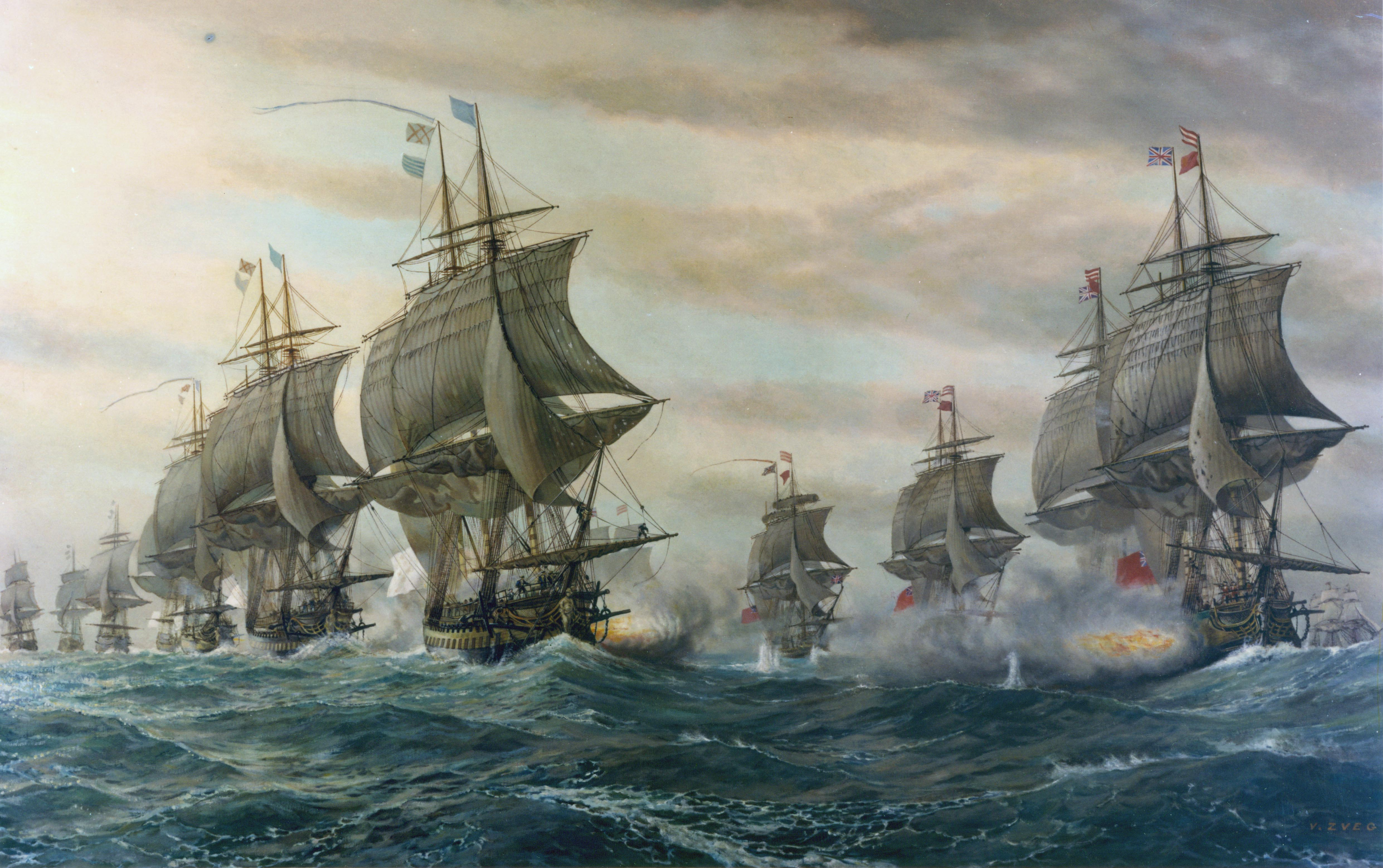
September 5: Battle of the Chesapeake

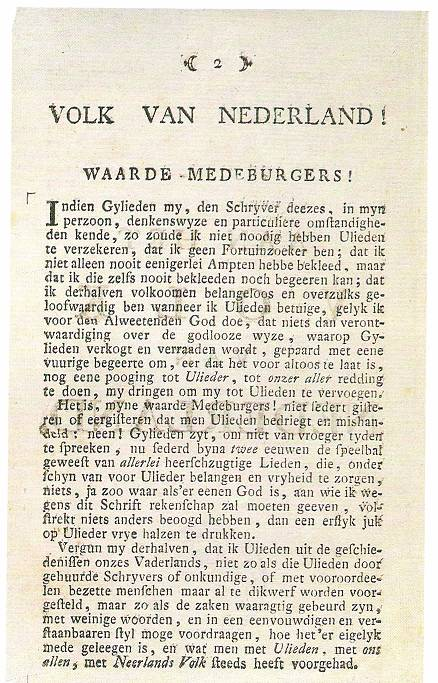
September 26: The first page of Aan het Volk van Nederland.

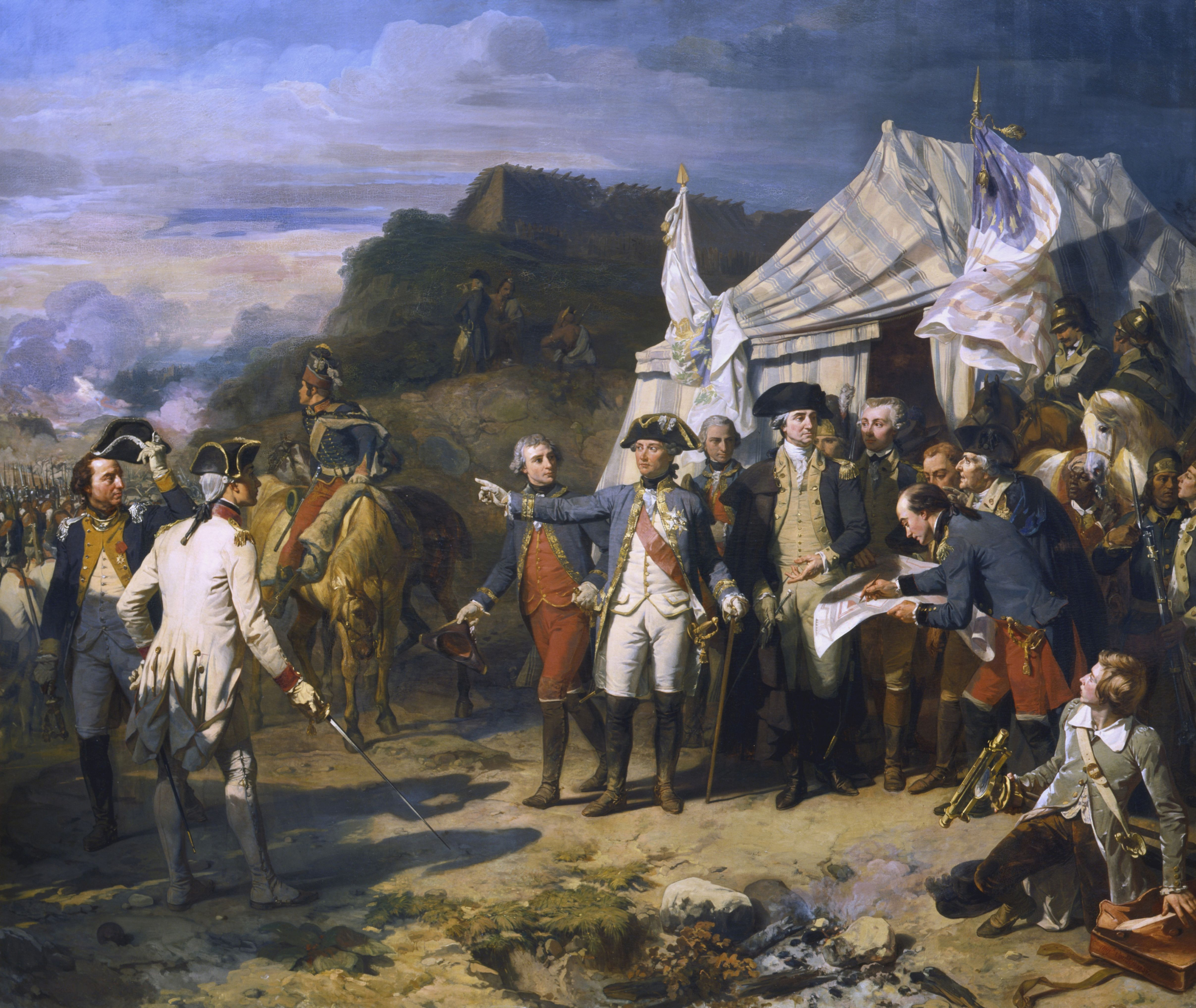
September 28: The Siege of Yorktown begins.

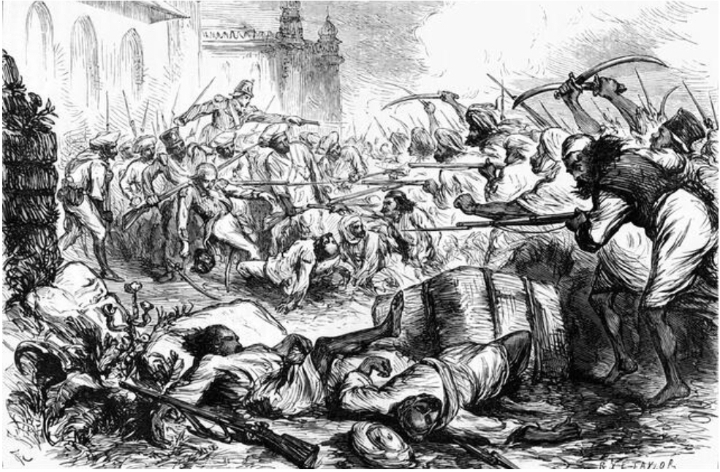
Benares uprising of 1781

1781 (MDCCLXXXI) was a common year starting on Monday of the Gregorian calendar and a common year starting on Friday of the Julian calendar, the 1781st year of the Common Era (CE) and Anno Domini (AD) designations, the 781st year of the 2nd millennium, the 81st year of the 18th century, and the 2nd year of the 1780s decade. As of the start of 1781, the Gregorian calendar was 11 days ahead of the Julian calendar, which remained in localized use until 1923.

== Events ==
=== January–March ===
- January – William Pitt the Younger, later Prime Minister of Great Britain, enters Parliament, aged 21.
- January 1 – Industrial Revolution: The Iron Bridge opens across the River Severn in England.
- January 2 – Virginia passes a law ceding its western land claims, paving the way for Maryland to ratify the Articles of Confederation.
- January 5 – American Revolutionary War: Richmond, Virginia is burned by British naval forces, led by Benedict Arnold.
- January 6 – Battle of Jersey: British troops prevent the French from occupying Jersey in the Channel Islands.
- January 17 – American Revolutionary War – Battle of Cowpens: The American Continental Army, under Daniel Morgan, decisively defeats British forces in South Carolina.
- February 2 – The Articles of Confederation are ratified by Maryland, the 13th and final state to do so.
- February 3 – Fourth Anglo-Dutch War – Capture of Sint Eustatius: British forces take the Dutch Caribbean island of Sint Eustatius, with only a few shots fired. On November 26 it is retaken by Dutch-allied French forces.
- March – Riots break out in Socorro, Santander, and spread to other towns.
- March 1 – The United States Continental Congress implements the Articles of Confederation, forming its Perpetual Union as the United States in Congress Assembled.
- March 13 – Sir William Herschel discovers the planet Uranus. Originally he calls it Georgium Sidus (George's Star), in honour of King George III.
- March 15 – American Revolutionary War – Battle of Guilford Court House: American General Nathanael Greene loses to the British.
- March 16 – Wolfgang Amadeus Mozart arrives in Vienna after being fired by the Archbishop of Salzburg. He would stay there for the rest of his brief life.

=== April–June ===
- April 4 – American Revolutionary War: The Spanish capture the sloop-of-war HMS St Fermin off Málaga, Spain.
- April 6 – The rebellion by Túpac Amaru II, against the Spanish colonial government of Peru, is ended as Tupac, his wife and two of his sons are captured at Checacupe.
- April 10 – Future U.S. President Andrew Jackson, age 14, is slashed by a British officer's sword at his home near Waxhaw, North Carolina, after refusing to clean the officer's boots, an event that leaves physical and psychological scars.
- April 14 – The Continental Congress votes a resolution thanking U.S. Captain John Paul Jones for his services.
- April 18 – Future New York mayor James Duane, North Carolina representative William Sharpe and future Connecticut governor Oliver Wolcott deliver the first report to the U.S. Continental Congress about the national debt and report it to be 24,057,157 and 2/5 dollars.
- April 25 – American Revolutionary War: The Battle of Hobkirk's Hill takes place in Camden, South Carolina
- May 9 – General John Campbell, defender of the British colony of West Florida, surrenders the capital at Pensacola to Spanish forces commanded by Bernardo de Galvez.
- May 18 – A Spanish army sent from Lima puts down the Inca rebellions, and captures and savagely executes Túpac Amaru II.
- June 12 – Ohmiya (近江屋), as predecessor for Takeda, a major worldwide pharmaceutical brand, is founded in Doshomachi (道修町), Osaka, Japan.

=== July–September ===
- July 27 – French spy François Henri de la Motte is hanged and drawn before a large crowd at Tyburn, London in England for high treason.
- July 29 – American Revolution – Skirmish at the House in the Horseshoe: A Tory force under David Fanning attacks Phillip Alston's smaller force of Whigs, at Alston's home in Cumberland County, North Carolina (in present day Moore County, North Carolina). Alston's troops surrender, after Fanning's men attempt to ram the house with a cart of burning straw.
- August 30 – American Revolution: A French fleet under Comte de Grasse enters Chesapeake Bay, cutting British General Charles Cornwallis off from escape by sea.
- September 4 – Los Angeles is founded as El Pueblo de Nuestra Señora la Reina de Los Ángeles de Porciuncula ("City of Our Lady the Queen of the Angels of Porciuncula"), by a group of 44 Spanish settlers in California.
- September 5 – American Revolution – Battle of the Chesapeake: A British fleet under Thomas Graves arrives and fights de Grasse, but is unable to break through to relieve the Siege of Yorktown.
- September 6 – American Revolution – Battle of Groton Heights: A British force under Benedict Arnold attacks a fort in Groton, Connecticut, achieving a strategic victory.
- September 8 – American Revolution – Battle of Eutaw Springs, South Carolina: The war's last significant battle, in the Southern theatre, ends in a narrow British tactical victory.
- September 10 – American Revolution: Graves gives up trying to break through the now-reinforced French fleet and returns to New York, leaving Cornwallis to his fate.
- September 28 – American Revolution: American and French troops begin a siege of the British at Yorktown, Virginia.

=== October–December ===
- October 12 – The first bagpipes competition is held in the Masonic Arms, Falkirk, Scotland.
- October 19 – American Revolution: Following the Siege of Yorktown, General Charles Cornwallis surrenders to General George Washington at Yorktown, Virginia, ending the armed struggle of the American Revolution.
- October 20 – A Patent of Toleration, providing limited freedom of worship, is approved in the Habsburg monarchy.
- November 5 – John Hanson is elected President of the Continental Congress.
- November 29
  - English slave traders begin to throw approximately 142 slaves taken on in Accra overboard alive from the slave ship Zong in the Caribbean Sea to conserve supplies for the remainder; the Liverpool owners subsequently attempt to reclaim part of their value from insurers.
  - Henry Hurle officially founds the Ancient Order of Druids in London, England.
- December – A school is founded in Washington County, Pennsylvania that will later be known as Washington & Jefferson College.
- December 12 – American Revolutionary War – Second Battle of Ushant: The British Royal Navy, commanded by Rear Admiral Richard Kempenfelt in HMS Victory, decisively defeats the French fleet in the Bay of Biscay.

=== Date unknown ===
- Joseph II, Holy Roman Emperor abolishes serfdom.
- The Bank of North America is chartered by the Continental Congress.
- Charles Messier publishes the final catalog of Messier objects.
- Carl Wilhelm Scheele discovers tungsten.
- Immanuel Kant publishes his Critique of Pure Reason.
- Reverend Samuel Peters publishes his General History of Connecticut, using the term blue law for the first time.
- Phillips Exeter Academy is founded in New Hampshire.
- 'Journalisme' appears for the first time (in French).

== Births ==
- January 26 – Achim von Arnim, German novelist and poet (d. 1831)
- January 30 – Adelbert von Chamisso, German poet and scientist (d. 1838)
- February 17 – René Laennec, French physician and inventor (d. 1826)
- March 1 – Javiera Carrera, Chilean independence campaigner (d. 1862)
- March 4 – Rebecca Gratz, American educator, philanthropist (d. 1869)
- March 13 – Karl Friedrich Schinkel, German architect, painter (d. 1841)
- March 17 – Dominique Jacques de Eerens, Governor general of the Dutch East Indies (d. 1840)

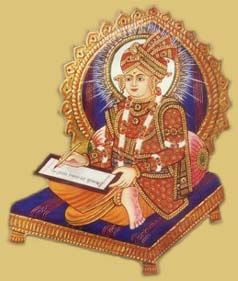
Swaminarayan

- April 3 – Swaminarayan, Indian Hindu reformer and deity (d. 1830)
- May 9 – Henri Cassini, French botanist and naturalist (d. 1832)

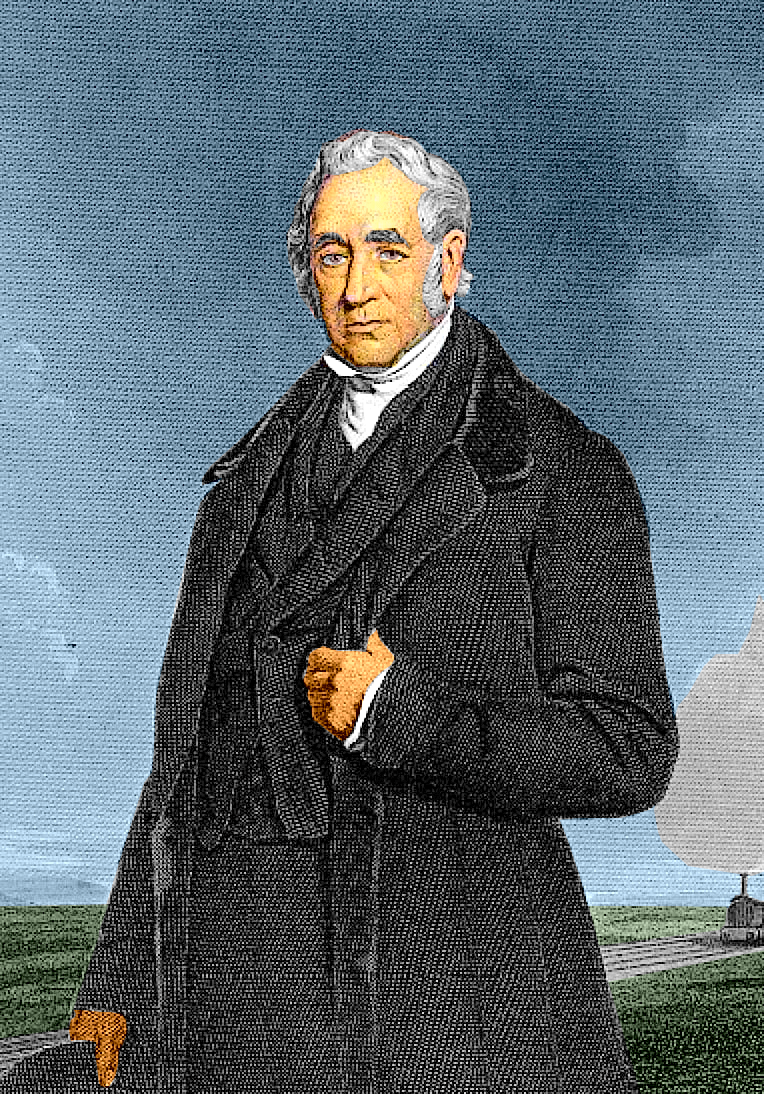
George Stephenson

- June 9 – George Stephenson, English engineer, designer of railway locomotives Locomotion No. 1, Rocket (d. 1848)
- June 21 – Siméon Denis Poisson, French mathematician, physicist (d. 1840)
- July 6
  - Stamford Raffles, English founder of Singapore (d. 1826)
  - John D. Sloat, American naval officer (d. 1867)
- July 27 – Mauro Giuliani, Italian composer (d. 1829)
- September 3 – Eugène de Beauharnais, French nobleman, son of Napoleon's wife Joséphine (d. 1824)
- September 5 – Anton Diabelli, Austrian music publisher, editor and composer (d. 1858)
- October 5 – Bernard Bolzano, Czech philosopher and mathematician (d. 1848)
- October 22 – Louis Joseph, Dauphin of France (d. 1789)
- November 1 – Joseph Karl Stieler, German painter (d. 1858)
- November 6
  - Lucy Aikin, English writer (d. 1864)
  - Maha Bandula, Commander-in-chief of the Burmese military forces (d. 1825)
- November 20 – Karl Friedrich Eichhorn, German jurist (d. 1854)
- November 29 – Andrés Bello, Venezuelan poet, lawmaker, teacher, philosopher, sociologist (d. 1865)
- November 30 – Alexander Berry, Scottish adventurer, Australian pioneer (d. 1873)
- December 11 – Sir David Brewster, Scottish physicist (d. 1868)

=== Date unknown ===
- Sanité Bélair, Haitian national heroine (d. 1802)
- Haji Shariatullah, Bengali Islamic scholar (d. 1840)
- William Williams of Wern, Welsh minister (d. 1840)

== Deaths ==
- January 12 – Richard Challoner, English Catholic prelate (b. 1691)
- January 15 – Mariana Victoria of Spain, Queen consort of Portugal (b. 1718)

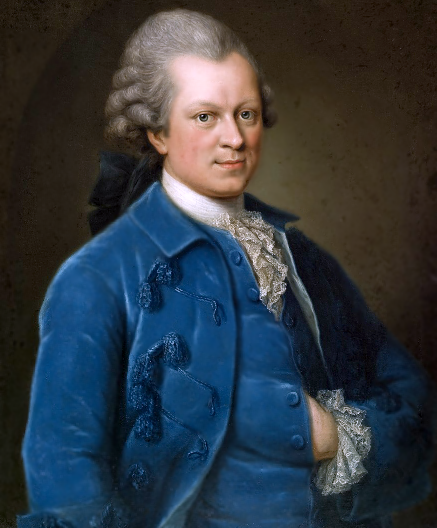
Gotthold Ephraim Lessing

- February 15 – Gotthold Ephraim Lessing, German author, philosopher (b. 1729)
- February 23 – George Taylor, Founding Father of the United States and signer of the Declaration of Independence (b. c. 1716)
- March 17 – Johannes Ewald, Danish national dramatist and poet (b. 1743)
- March 18 – Anne Robert Turgot, French statesman (b. 1727)
- April 23 – James Abercrombie, British general (b. 1706)
- April 28 – Cornelius Harnett, American delegate to the Continental Congress (b. 1723)
- May 3 – Charles Roe, English businessman (b. 1715)
- May 16 – Giacomo Puccini (senior), Italian composer (b. 1712)

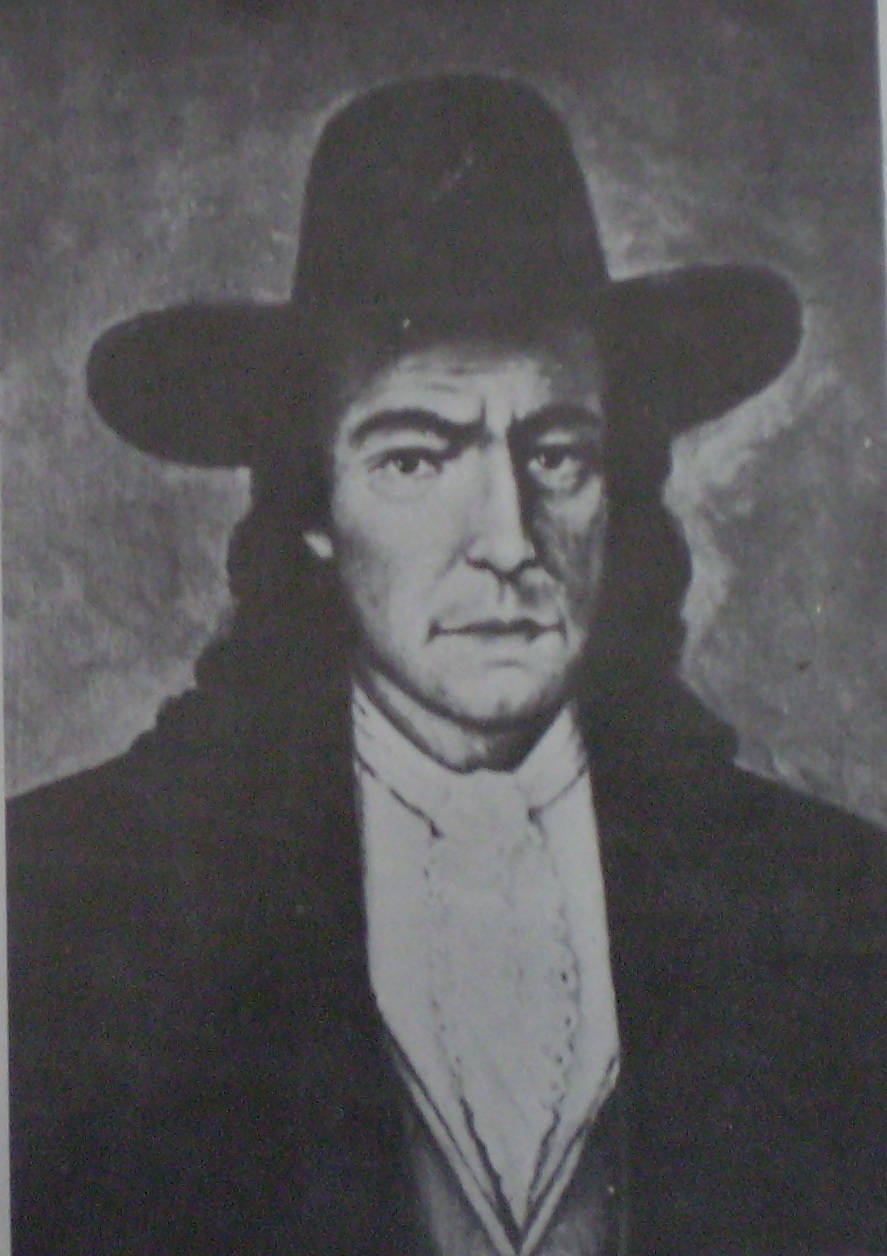
Túpac Amaru II

- May 18 – Túpac Amaru II, Peruvian indigenous rebel leader (b. 1742)
- May 18 – Micaela Bastidas Puyucahua, Peruvian indigenous rebel leader (b. 1745)
- May 27 – Giovanni Battista Beccaria, Italian physicist (b. 1716)
- May 30 – John Conder, Independent English minister at Cambridge (b. 1714)
- July 18 – Padre Francisco Garcés, Spanish missionary (killed) (b. 1738)
- July 23 – John Joachim Zubly, Swiss-born Continental Congressman (b. 1724)
- August 16 – Charles-François de Broglie, marquis de Ruffec, French soldier and diplomat (b. 1719)
- September 7 – Lord Richard Cavendish (1752–1781), second son of William Cavendish (b. 1752)
- September 11 – Johann August Ernesti, German theologian and philologist (b. 1707)
- September 12 – Peter Scheemakers, Flemish sculptor (b. 1691)
- September 28 – William Nassau de Zuylestein, 4th Earl of Rochford, British diplomat, statesman (b. 1717)
- October 16 – Edward Hawke, 1st Baron Hawke, British naval officer (b. 1705)
- November 4
  - Johann Nikolaus Götz, German poet (b. 1721)
  - Charles Morris, Canadian judge (b. 1711)
- November 21 – Jean-Frédéric Phélypeaux, Count of Maurepas, French statesman (b. 1701)
- December 2 – Zenón de Somodevilla, 1st Marqués de la Ensenada, Spanish noble (b. 1702)
- December 30 – John Needham, British biologist and priest (b. 1713)
- December – Juan Montón y Mallén, composer (b. c. 1730)

=== Date unknown ===
- Samuel Conrad Schwach, Norwegian newspaper publisher (b. c. 1731)
