= Olaug Løken =

Norwegian writer and activist

Olaug Marie Løken (29 November 1854 – 11 March 1925) was a Norwegian writer and activist.

== Personal life ==
She was born at Sundnes in Inderøy Municipality as a daughter of landowner and politician Herman Løchen (1822–76) and Anne Margrethe Jenssen (1826–1911). She had ten siblings, among them Håkon Løken and Gudrun Løchen Drewsen. The family led a rich social life with many visiting writers and artists; P. Chr. Asbjørnsen exercised a special influence on Olaug Løken.

She was also a first cousin of Arne, Einar and Kalle Løchen. In October 1881 in Trondhjem she married another first cousin, editor Hjalmar Løken (1852–1932).

== Career ==
Løken took orthopedic education in Kristiania, but made a career as a writer and public debater. Her husband was the editor of Norske Intelligenssedler, and Løken debuted as a food writer here in the 1890s. In 1897 she issued the cookbook Madstel og Husstel for almindelige Husholdninger, which became a large success with six re-issues.

She also issued two books on childcare, Barnestel in 1903 and For Barnepiger og Mødre in 1905. The former was translated to Swedish in 1906 and Finnish in 1908.

Løken was also a board member of the Norwegian Association for Women's Rights from 1891 to 1892, and was one of the thirteen co-founders of the National Association for Women's Suffrage in 1898. She died in March 1925 in Oslo.
