= Einar Løchen (1918–2008) =

Norwegian judge

Einar Løchen (1918–2008) was a Norwegian judge.

He was born in Kristiania. He was a grandson of Chief Justice Einar Løchen, grandnephew of Hjalmar Løken, Thorvald Løchen and Kalle Løchen, and first cousin once removed of Olaug Løken and Håkon Løken.

He worked in the Norwegian Ministry of Foreign Affairs from 1949 to 1963, then as a barrister from 1964. In 1974 he was appointed as a presiding judge, and from 1977 to 1985 he served as a Supreme Court Justice.
