= Arvesen =

Arvesen is a surname of Norwegian origin. Notable people with that name include:

- Arve Arvesen (1869–1951), Norwegian violinist
- Jan Arvesen (1931–2000), Norwegian diplomat
- Kristian Arvesen (1883 – after 1937), Norwegian farmer and politician
- Kurt Asle Arvesen (born 1975), Norwegian road bicycle racer
- Nina Arvesen (born 1961), American actress
- Olaus Arvesen (1830–1917), Norwegian educator and politician
- Ole Peder Arvesen (1895–1991), Norwegian engineer and mathematician
