= Kempenfelt =

Kempenfelt may refer to:

- Richard Kempenfelt (1718–1782), admiral in the Royal Navy.
- Several ships of the Royal Navy named HMS Kempenfelt.
- Kempenfelt Bay, an arm of Lake Simcoe around which lies Barrie, Ontario, Canada
