= Løken (surname) =

The surname Løken or Loken may refer to:

- Astrid Løken (1911–2008), Norwegian entomologist and WWII resistance member
- Bård Løken (born 1964), Norwegian photographer
- Johan Christen Løken (1944–2017), Norwegian politician
- Karl Petter Løken (born 1966), Norwegian football player
- Kristian Løken (1884–1961), Norwegian military officer
- Håkon Løken (1859–1923), Norwegian jurist, journalist, newspaper editor and non-fiction writer
- Hjalmar Løken (1852–1932), Norwegian jurist and newspaper editor
- Martin Løken (1863–1942), Norwegian politician
- Monica Løken, Norwegian handball player
- Olaug Løken (1854–1925), Norwegian writer and activist
- Sverre Løken (born 1960), Norwegian rower
- Brent Loken, ecologist, social scientist, conservationist, and social entrepreneur
- George Fredrick Loken (1906–1975), Canadian businessman and politician in Saskatchewan
- James B. Loken (born 1940), American jurist
- Kristanna Loken (born 1979), American actress and model
- Newt Loken (1919–2011), American artistic gymnast and coach
