= Johannes Martens =

Johannes Martens (9 July 1870 – 6 March 1938) was a Norwegian newspaper editor and politician for the Conservative Party.

== Personal life ==
He was born in Målselv as a son of dean Nikolai Martens (1836–1890) and Eleonora Henrikke Clodius Giæver. His maternal grandfather Hans Martinus Giæver was a brother of Jens Holmboe Giæver (father of Joachim Giæver) and Joachim Gotsche Giæver (maternal grandfather of Halvdan Koht), making Martens a second cousin of Koht.

In 1896 he married consul's daughter Christiane Margrethe Winsnes.

== Career ==
He finished his secondary education in 1889, finished conscript officer training in 1891 and graduated from the Royal Frederick University with the cand.jur. degree in 1894. He served as secretary-general of the Conservative Party from 1899 to 1906, and was then editor-in-chief of Hamar Stiftstidende from 1906 to 1916. He was succeeded by Erling Bühring-Dehli.

He worked as a director in Pressebyrået from 1916, Høydahl-Ohmes Annonsebyrå from 1918, Morgenbladet from 1920 and then Norges Handels- og Sjøfartstidende. He chaired Norges konservative arbeiderorganisasjon from 1904 to 1906, was a board member of the Conservative Press Association from 1907 to 1914, Den Norske Bladeierforening from 1909 to 1916 and the Norwegian Press Association from 1910 to 1916.

He also chaired the Norwegian Lifesaving Society from 1913 to 1916. After retiring from Hamar Stiftstidende he moved to Oslo. He was deputy chair of the school board in the city from 1922 to 1925. From 1925 to 1926 he chaired the city's Rotary chapter, followed by periods as Rotary Governor in Norway from 1930 to 1931 and board member of Rotary International from 1931 to 1932. He died in March 1938.

Party political offices
Preceded by Thorstein Diesen	Secretary-general of the Conservative Party; 1899–1906	Succeeded by Adolph Helwig
