= Loken (disambiguation) =

Kristanna Loken is an American actress.

Loken or Løken can also refer to:

- Løken, Norwegian village
- Løken Moraines, near the Windmill Islands, Antarctica
- Løken Pond in South Georgia, a British overseas territory in the southern Atlantic Ocean
- Senior–Løken syndrome, a congenital eye disorder
- Løken (surname)
