= Erling Bühring-Dehli =

Norwegian newspaper editor and politician

Erling Bühring-Dehli (11 August 1887 – 13 December 1957) was a Norwegian newspaper editor and politician for the Conservative Party.

He was born at Furnes in Hedmark, Norway. He was the son of Berthel Dehli (1847–1891) a cavalry captain and farmer, and Agnes Ingebjørg Brynhild Ihle (1848–1925). He finished his secondary education at Hamar Cathedral School (Hamar Katedralskole) in 1905 and graduated with the cand.jur. degree from the Royal Fredrik's University (now University of Oslo) in 1909.

While studying he worked as a part-time journalist in Aftenposten and Hamar Stiftstidende. He was hired in Morgenavisen in 1909, and in Aftenposten from 1910 to 1911. He was also subeditor of Dagsposten for half a year. He was the editor-in-chief of Hamar Stiftstidende when he in March 1916 initiated the merger with Oplandenes Avis. The newspaper continued as Hamar Stiftstidende og Oplandenes Avis, and Bühring-Dehli was the editor-in-chief there from July 1916 to October 1932. From 1934 he edited Allers Familiejournal.

He chaired the local Conservative Party branch in Hamar, and was a member of Hamar city council from 1925 to 1928, and was elected to the Parliament of Norway from the constituency Market towns of Hedmark and Oppland counties in 1927 and 1930.

He chaired Oplandenes Press Association from 1916 to 1920, and was a board member of the Norwegian Press Association from 1918 to 1919 and 1922 to 1925; also of the Norwegian News Agency from 1922 to 1932 as well as the Norwegian Broadcasting Corporation. He was a member of Riksteaternemnda and from 1937 to 1946 he was a supervisory council member of Nationaltheatret. He published the book Johan Nygaardsvold, about Johan Nygaardsvold, in 1939.

During the occupation of Norway by Nazi Germany he was arrested by the Nazis on 29 November 1940. He was imprisoned in Møllergata 19 until 17 March 1942, then in Grini concentration camp until his release on 3 February 1943. After being released he returned as editor of Allers, but was in August 1943 relieved of the job by the Nazi Press Directorate. He returned to the editor's chair after the occupation's end in 1945. He died in 1957.
