= Oplandenes Avis =

Norwegian newspaper

Oplandenes Avis was a Norwegian newspaper, published in Hamar in Hedmark county.

It started on 3 July 1872 by Olaus Arvesen, who had been dismissed as editor of the conservative newspaper Hamar Stiftstidende. He remained editor until 1906, and supported the Liberal Party. The newspaper was edited by Gerhard Jynge from 1908 to 1911. It was published twice a week, from 1879 three days and from 1889 six days a week.

After Arvesen left the editor chair, the newspaper shifted towards the right (Coalition Party, later Liberal Left Party). In other words Oplandenes Avis converged with Hamar Stiftstidende, and in March 1916 editor of the latter Erling Bühring-Dehli asked Oplandenes Avis editor Johannes Martens if he wanted to sell his newspaper. Martens agreed, and after a while Oplandenes Avis came with its last issue on 30 June 1916.
