= Arne Løchen =

Norwegian psychologist, philosopher and literary researcher (1850–1930)

Arne Løchen (20 November 1850 – 22 August 1930) was a Norwegian psychologist, philosopher and literary researcher.

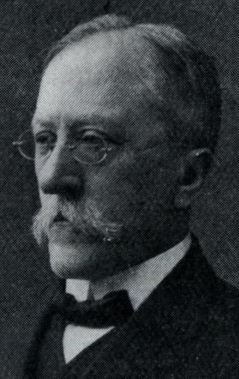
Arne Løchen

Arne Løchen was born in Vang Municipality (now part of Hamar Municipality), in Hedmark county, Norway. He was the twin brother of Einar Løchen, politician for the Liberal Party. His family also included his brothers, Kalle Løchen (1865-1893) who was an artist and Hjalmar Løken, editor of the Dagsposten and Norske Intelligenz-Seddeler.

Løchen was awarded ex. phil. (1870) and doctorate (1886). He was a professor of philosophy at the University of Oslo (1900-1921). Among his works is an essay on Ibsen regarded as important for later research, and a monography on Johan Sebastian Welhaven. He was co-editor of the magazine Nyt Tidsskrift from 1892 to 1895. He was a member of the Norwegian Academy of Science from 1898. He was decorated a Knight of the Order of the Dannebrog in 1916.

== Selected works ==
- Om J. Stuart Mills Logik. En kritisk studie, 1885
- Spørgsmaal vedkommende de afasiske Sygdomme, 1888
- J. S. Welhaven. Liv og skrifter, 1898–1900
- Digtning og videnskab, 1913
- Fantasien. Et stykke av sjælelæren, 1917
