= Florence Balgarnie =

British suffragette and temperance activist (1856–1928)

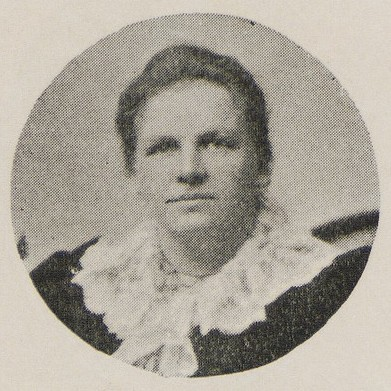
- Born: 19 August 1856; Scarborough, North Riding of Yorkshire, England
- Died: 25 March 1928 (aged 71); Florence, Kingdom of Italy
- Burial place: Cimitero degli Allori, Florence, Italy
- Occupations: Suffragette, speaker and temperance activist
- Employer: Women's Signal
- Organization(s): Central National Society for Women's Suffrage; British Women's Temperance Association; National Union of Women's Suffrage Societies; British Anti-lynching League; London Anti-lynching Committee; Society for Promoting the Return of Women as County Councillors; Personal Rights Association; Moral Reform Union; People's Suffrage Federation

Florence Balgarnie (19 August 1856 – 25 March 1928) was a British suffragette, speaker, pacifist, feminist, and temperance activist. Characterised as a "staunch Liberal", and influenced by Lydia Becker, Balgarnie began her support of women's suffrage from the age of seventeen.

== Early years ==
Florence Balgarnie was born in Scarborough, North Riding of Yorkshire, England, on 19 August 1856. Her parents were Rev. Robert Balgarnie (1826–1899), a well-known Nonconformist minister of the South Cliff Congregational Church, and his wife, Martha Rooke. The family included two younger sisters, including one named Mary.

== Career ==
Balgarnie was elected to the Scarborough School Board in 1883. It was here that Balgarnie developed her skills as a speaker. In her native town, she aroused high anticipations for her future career. Since coming to London, in 1884, or 1886, temperance was the subject which interested her the most, and the one on which she spoke with the greatest frequency. It was around 1884 that, with some fear, Balgarnie first began public speaking, but it became a source of pleasure. A great temperance meeting at Derby, Derbyshire, England during a general election, found her addressing several thousand people in the open air. It was to her "a crowded hour of glorious life"; and it was characteristic of her power of repartee that a dissident in the crowd who set himself to interrupt Balgarnie's speech became converted to her view. In 1885, she also addressed crowds at Brigg, Gainsborough, Grantham, Horncastle, Louth, and Sleaford in Lincolnshire.

By 1889, she became the secretary of the Central National Society for Women's Suffrage, but this position was given up to become the organising secretary, under Lady Henry Somerset, of the British Women's Temperance Association in 1893. Balgarnie held this appointment till 1895, and thereafter made time for speaking and writing on behalf of temperance and other causes. Balgarnie was the author of A plea for the appointment of police matrons at police stations (1894).

In 1902, in Washington, D.C., she represented the National Union of Women's Suffrage Societies (NUWSS) at the First Conference of the International Woman Suffrage Alliance. She was also affiliated with the International Arbitration & Peace Association, the British Anti-lynching League, the London Anti-lynching Committee, the Society for Promoting the Return of Women as County Councillors, Personal Rights Association, Moral Reform Union, and the Men and Women's Club. She was a co-founder of the executive committee of the People's Suffrage Federation. She was later fired from employment at Women's Signal for her exposure of issues in the WCTU's stance on state colour lines, before being supported by Frederick Douglass' widow Helen Pitts Douglass in her stance.

She died in Florence, Italy, on 25 March 1928, aged 71, and was buried at Cimitero degli Allori, in Florence.

== Works ==
- Florence Balgarnie (1907). "The Women's Suffrage Movement in the Nineteenth Century". The Case for Women's Suffrage: 22–41. Wikidata Q107121322.
