= Kåre Fasting =

Norwegian journalist (1907–1983)

Kåre Fasting (1907–1983) was a Norwegian journalist, newspaper editor, novelist, biographer and non-fiction writer. He was a journalist for the newspaper Bergens Tidende from 1935, and edited Nidaros from 1945 to 1950. His literary début was the novel Havet gav from 1935.

== Personal life ==
Born in Østre Aker (now Oslo) on 14 August 1907, Fasting was a son of Michael Fasting and Louise Larsen. He married Ruth Clausen in 1931.

Fasting died in Oslo on 4 February 1983.
