= Olav Røgeberg =

Norwegian journalist, newspaper editor and magazine editor

Olav Røgeberg (August 11, 1885 – July 4, 1959) was a Norwegian journalist, newspaper editor and magazine editor. Born in Norway, he worked for the newspapers Drammens Tidende, Nidaros and Dagbladet, and was chief editor of Nidaros from 1930 to 1937. From 1938 he edited the magazine Alle Kvinners Blad. He was chairman of the board of the Norwegian News Agency from 1946.
