= Nidaros (newspaper) =

Norwegian newspaper

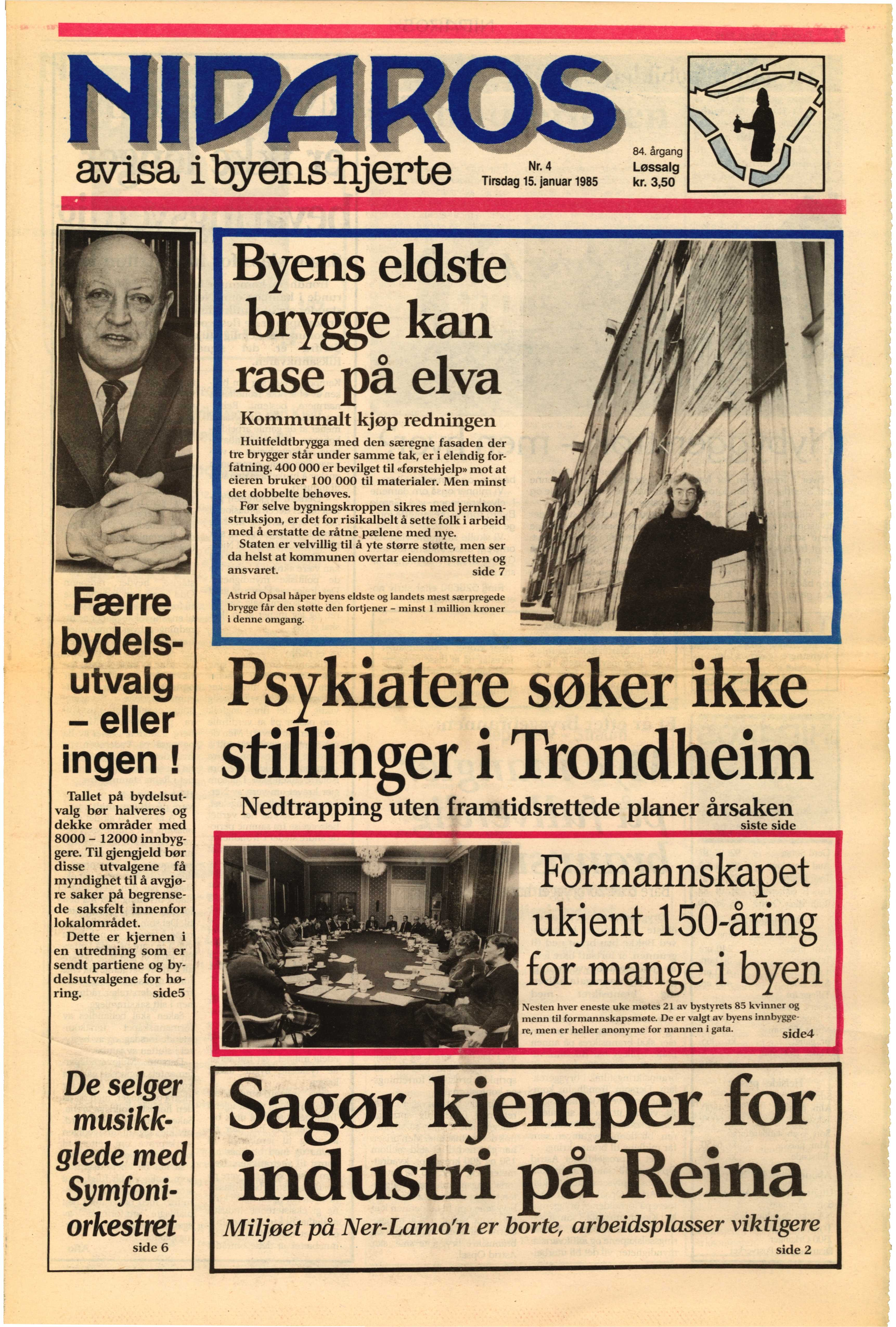
15 January 1985 cover

Nidaros was a Norwegian newspaper, published in Trondheim in Sør-Trøndelag.

Nidaros was started on 1 May 1902. Its first editor was former Dagsposten editor Håkon Løken, and with its Liberal Party affiliation Nidaros became the largest newspaper in Trondheim, with a circulation of 20–30,000. Among the political disputes of the time were electrification of the city's tramway system, establishment of a technical institution in Trondheim, the Norwegian Institute of Technology, and the eventual Dissolution of the union between Norway and Sweden. Løken left in 1909. From 1910 to 1911 Atle Øgaard was editor, and Kr. Aug. Retvedt took over from 1911 to 1917. Hjørvard Torsvik edited the newspaper from 1917 to 1930. Olav Røgeberg was chief editor from 1930 to 1937, and Fr. Lützow Holm edited Nidaros from 1937 to 1941. A great success was the feuilleton Bør Børson, Johan Falkberget's satirical story from the boom period during World War I, which was printed in the newspaper before being released as a book. The newspaper became less popular during and after the city naming controversy, when the name of the city Trondhjem was changed to Nidaros, and then among popular protest changed a second time to Trondheim. The anti-Nidaros activists did not like that the newspaper Nidaros retained its name.

The newspaper was stopped on 17 April 1941 during the occupation of Norway by Nazi Germany. After the war it was published as Trondheims-Pressen from 9 May to 12 May. It started again on 14 May 1945. Nidaros was among the three initiators to establish a working committee for the stopped newspapers (Norwegian: Arbeidsutvalget for de stansede aviser), along with Arbeiderbladet and Dagen. The newspapers, which had all been stopped during the war, had suffered significant losses because of this, and claimed compensation. Around sixty Norwegian newspapers eventually joined this initiative. In Trondheim, the newspaper situation had changed dramatically over the war years. Adresseavisen and Dagsposten had continued their publication during the Nazi regime, while Nidaros and Arbeider-Avisa were stopped. Kåre Fasting was chief editor from 1945 to 1950, and Gunnar Garbo edited Nidaros from 1954 to 1957, when Nidaros ceased to appear. Garbo then issued a weekly newspaper Søndagsekspressen, "loosely affiliated" with Nidaros, from February to August 1957. Nidaros started again on 28 February 1959. It changed its name to Trondheimsavisa in February 1989 before ultimately going bankrupt in 1991.
