= First Conference of the International Woman Suffrage Alliance =

1902 conference in Washington, D.C.

First Conference of the International Woman Suffrage Alliance was held in 1902 in Washington D.C. to consider the feasibility of organizing an International Woman Suffrage Association.

== Background ==
In 1902, the National-American Woman Suffrage Association invited all National woman suffrage organizations which existed at that date, to send an accredited delegate to attend a mass meeting which should be held in Washington, D. C., to consider the feasibility of organizing an International Woman Suffrage Association.

== Meeting ==
This meeting was held in Washington, D.C., February 12–18, 1902. A silver tray inscribed: "To Carrie Chapman Catt from the foreign delegates to the First International Suffrage Conference, Washington, D.C., Feb. 12–18, 1902" commemorated the event.

Six national associations were represented, namely: Canada, Germany, Great Britain, Norway, Sweden and the United States. Australia had no national association, but sent a delegate, several of the U.S. state societies contributing to a fund which was raised to assist her in paying the expenses of the long and costly journey from Melbourne to Washington. Where no suffrage associations had as yet been formed, National Councils of Women and American Consulates were consulted, in the effort to find representative women who sympathized with the movement for the enfranchisement of women. As a result of such correspondence, one delegate each attended from Chile, Russia and Turkey. Many reports upon the civil, educational and industrial status of women were secured. Some of these possessed high historical value. All such reports, in abridged form, together with the transactions, were printed and preserved.

This meeting voted to form an international union of national woman suffrage societies; but in order that each association entering into such alliance, should have opportunity to approve the basis of organization before it should be finally adopted, it was agreed to form a temporary organization only, without dues, and to complete the work at a second meeting which should be held in Berlin, in June, 1904. Susan B. Anthony was made Chairman of the temporary committee; Dr. jur. Anita Augspurg, Vice-Chairman; Florence Fenwick Miller, Treasurer; and Carrie Chapman Catt, Secretary. By the vote of the Washington meeting, each organized country was asked to name a committee of three, which should act as official correspondents for that country. Ten countries were thus united with the temporary association: Australia, Canada, Denmark, France, Germany, Great Britain, Norway, Sweden, the Netherlands and the US. Such committees acted in the capacity of mediums of communication between the International Committee and the association represented. Through them, a constitution in which was embodied the complete plan for organization, was submitted to each National Suffrage Association, and delegates to the Berlin meeting were to come with the advice and instruction of their respective societies.

== Notable people ==
- Susan B. Anthony
- Anita Augspurg
- Florence Balgarnie
- Carrie Chapman Catt
- Gudrun Løchen Drewsen
- Florence Fenwick Miller
- Vida Goldstein

== See also ==
- International Alliance of Women
