= L.C. Concept =

35 mm film projection sound format

LC Concept was a 35 mm film projection sound format, developed in France and released in 1991. It used 5.25" 300 megabyte capacity re-writable magneto-optical disks to hold 4 or 5.1 channels of MUSICAM compressed audio. Two disks were used to hold approximately three hours of sound. The system was adopted in France, Belgium, and Switzerland. A large litigation against Universal Studios, Steven Spielberg and DTS frightened the investors. DTS had to buy the LC patents to resolve the issue.

The system was developed by Pascal Chedeville and Élisabeth Lochen. A standard SMPTE timecode printed next to analogue soundtrack on the film print was read by a reader connected to the playback unit kept the playback in sync. The system was tested with a re-release of the Cyrano de Bergerac, and the first commercial release was Until the End of the World. Overall, around 30 features were released in this format in France, among which:

Basic Instinct, Free Willy, Falling Down, Cliffhanger, Backbeat, Silent Tongue, Boiling Point, Heaven and Earth, Cyrano de Bergerac, L.627, The Lover, Until the End of the World, The Accompanist, IP5: L'île aux pachydermes, All the World's Mornings, Arizona Dream, La Belle Histoire, Bitter Moon.

The company folded in 1994 due to a lack of funding. Pascal Chedeville received an Academy Award for Technical Achievement in 1995.
