= Kristian Arvesen =

Norwegian politician

Kristian Arvesen (10 January 1883 – 17 May 1973) was a Norwegian farmer and politician for the Centre Party.

He served as a deputy representative to the Norwegian Parliament from Østfold during the term 1931–1933. In 1931 and 1932 he took a regular seat, covering for Peder Kolstad who was Prime Minister in the cabinet Kolstad.

He was born in Fredrikstad, took an agrarian education in Asker in 1904, lived in Rygge for four years and then in Sem from 1909 to 1917. From 1913 to 1916 he was a member of the municipal council of Sem Municipality. He then lived in Rygge for the rest of his life, and was a municipal council member from 1919. He served as deputy mayor from 1931 to 1937. In addition he served on various local public committees.

He was a distant relative of Olaus and Oluf Arvesen.
