= HMS Norfolk (1757) =

Ship of the line of the Royal Navy

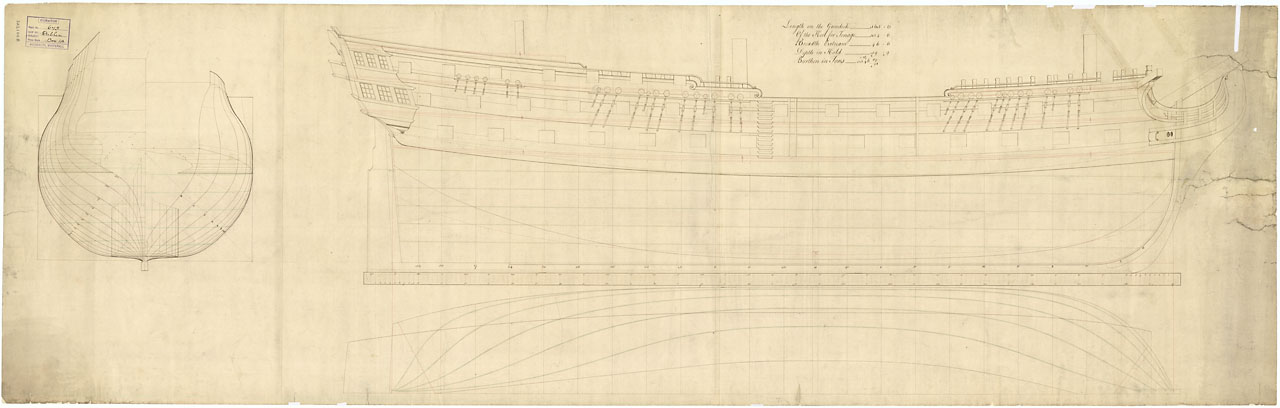
- Norfolk

History

Great Britain
- Name: HMS Norfolk
- Ordered: 26 August 1755
- Builder: Deptford Dockyard
- Laid down: 18 November 1755
- Launched: 28 December 1757
- Commissioned: 23 February 1758
- Fate: Broken up, December 1774

General characteristics
- Class & type: Dublin-class ship of the line
- Tons burthen: 155617/94 (bm)
- Length: 165 ft 6 in (50.44 m) (gundeck)
- Beam: 46 ft 6 in (14.17 m)
- Depth of hold: 19 ft 9 in (6.02 m)
- Propulsion: Sails
- Sail plan: Full-rigged ship
- Armament: 74 guns: Gundeck: 28 × 32 pdrs; Upper gundeck: 28 × 18 pdrs; Quarterdeck: 14 × 9 pdrs; Forecastle: 4 × 9 pdrs

HMS Norfolk was a 74-gun third-rate ship of the line of the Royal Navy, and the second ship to bear the name. She was built by Adrian Hayes at Deptford Dockyard and launched on 8 December 1757. She was active during the Seven Years' War.

== Service history ==
Her first commander was Captain Peircy Brett (later Commodore Brett) and she had a complement of 550 crew. Under Brett on 5 June 1758 she was part of the major British raid on St Malo (totalling around 50 ships).

Norfolk emulated her predecessor (HMS Norfolk (1693)) by reinforcing the West Indies, where she escorted a fleet that was transporting vital stores and six infantry regiments to that region.

In September 1758 command passed to Captain Robert Hughes and under Hughes in January 1759 a successful attack was made on Guadeloupe.

In September 1760 under Captain Richard Kempenfelt, she was part of the Siege of Pondicherry (1760).

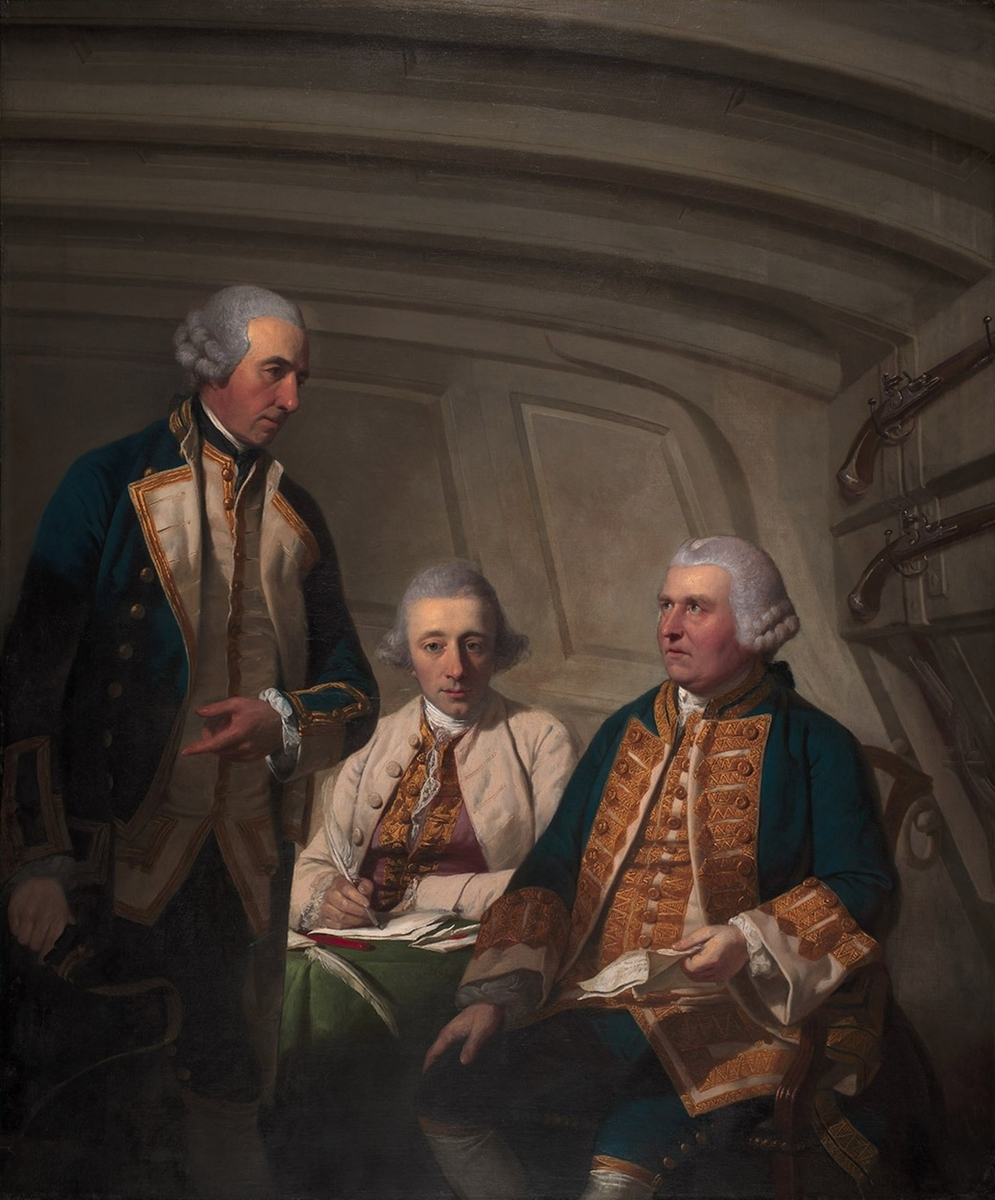
Kempenfelt (left) receives orders during the Battle of Manila on Norfolk from his Admiral Samuel Cornish (right). Sitting between them is the Admiral's secretary Thomas Parry, a future director of the EIC. Artist, Tilly Kettle.

On 10 February 1761 she took part in the capture of Mahe. On 24 September 1762 she was part of the Battle of Manila.

She became flagship of the Commander-In-Chief East Indies Station, Rear-Admiral Charles Steevens and his successor Vice-Admiral Samuel Cornish. Norfolk was decommissioned in 1764, after her return to Portsmouth was broken up in 1774.

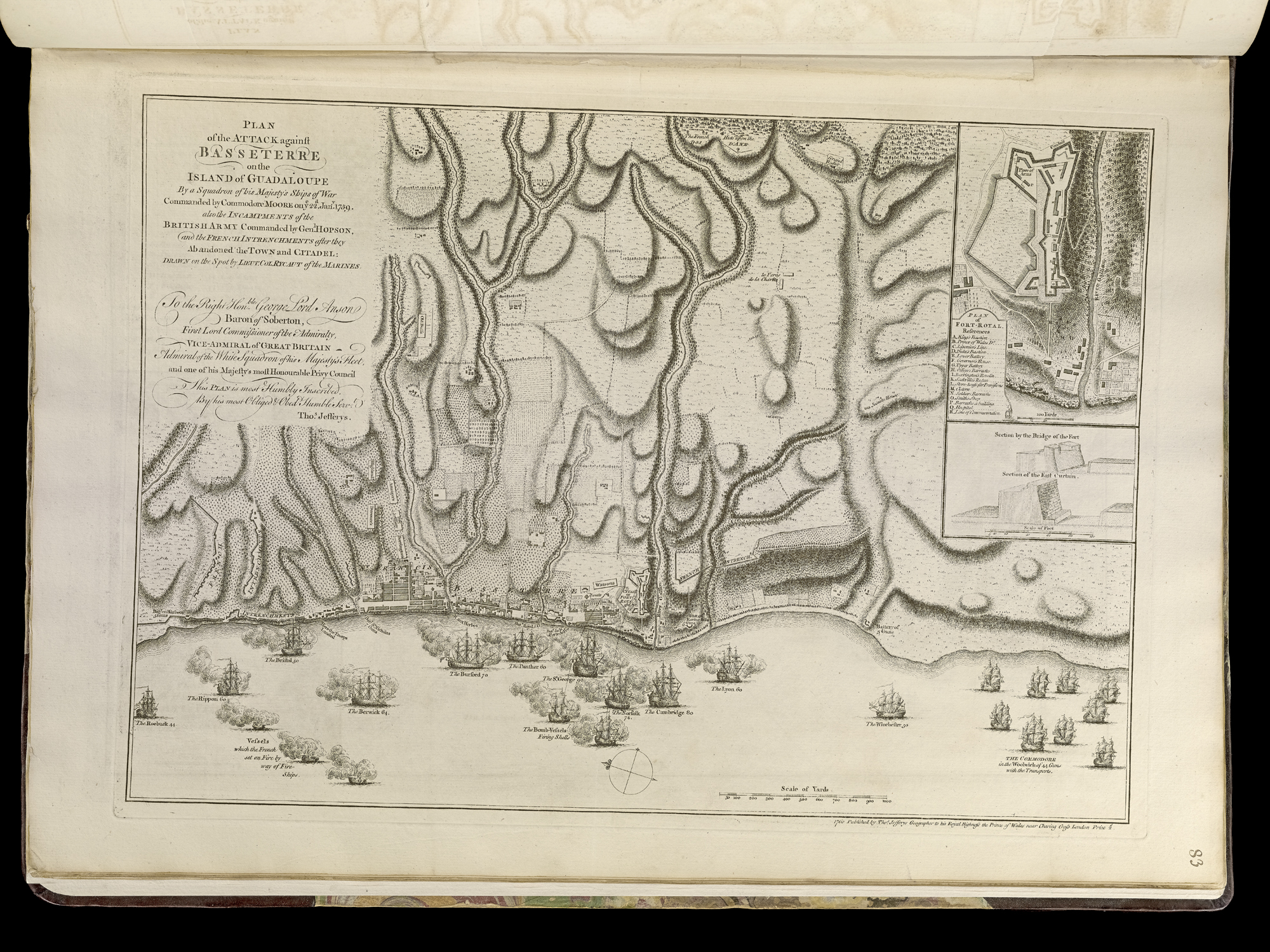
Plan of the attack against Basseterre, Guadeloupe by a squadron of Royal Navy ships of war commanded by Commodore Moore on 22 January 1759 - also the encampments of the British. Shows Norfolk

== Notable Commanders ==
- Peircy Brett 1757 to 1758
- Hyde Parker 1759 to 1760
- Richard Kempenfelt 1760 to 1762
- George Ourry 1762 to 1764

== Notable Crew ==
- Charles Steevens flag officer
- Samuel Cornish flag officer

== See also ==
- Battle of Manila (1762)
