= Gerhard Jynge =

Norwegian newspaper editor

Gerhard Vilhelm Jynge (1877 – February 21, 1945) was a Norwegian newspaper editor.

He became the editor of Oplandenes Avis in 1908 and the sub-editor of Verdens Gang in 1911, served as the first editor of Haugesunds Dagblad from June 8, 1912 to December 1913, became the editor of Dagsposten in Trondheim in 1914, and was the editor of Aalesunds Avis from 1917 to 1921. He became an appellate judge pro tem in Bergen in 1921, and a regular judge in 1928. He died on February 21, 1945, when the steamship Austri was sunk by British aircraft in Bømla Fjord.
