= Aalesunds Avis =

Norwegian newspaper

Aalesunds Avis (The Ålesund Gazette) was a newspaper published in Ålesund, Norway from 1917 to 1958. The paper belonged to the Conservative Party. Its publication was halted by the Nazis in 1942. The paper resumed publication in 1947, and appeared weekly until 1958, when it was discontinued.

== List of editors ==
- Gerhard Jynge 1917–1921
- Carl Ulfsæt 1921–1924
- Sigurd Woll 1924–1925
- Øyvin Lange 1925–1929
- S. Stenbro Jacobsen 1929–1939
- Reidar Stavseth 1939–1940
- Kjell Steinsvik 1940–1942
- Einar S. Ellefsen 1947–1958
