= François Henri de la Motte =

Traitor executed in England in 1781

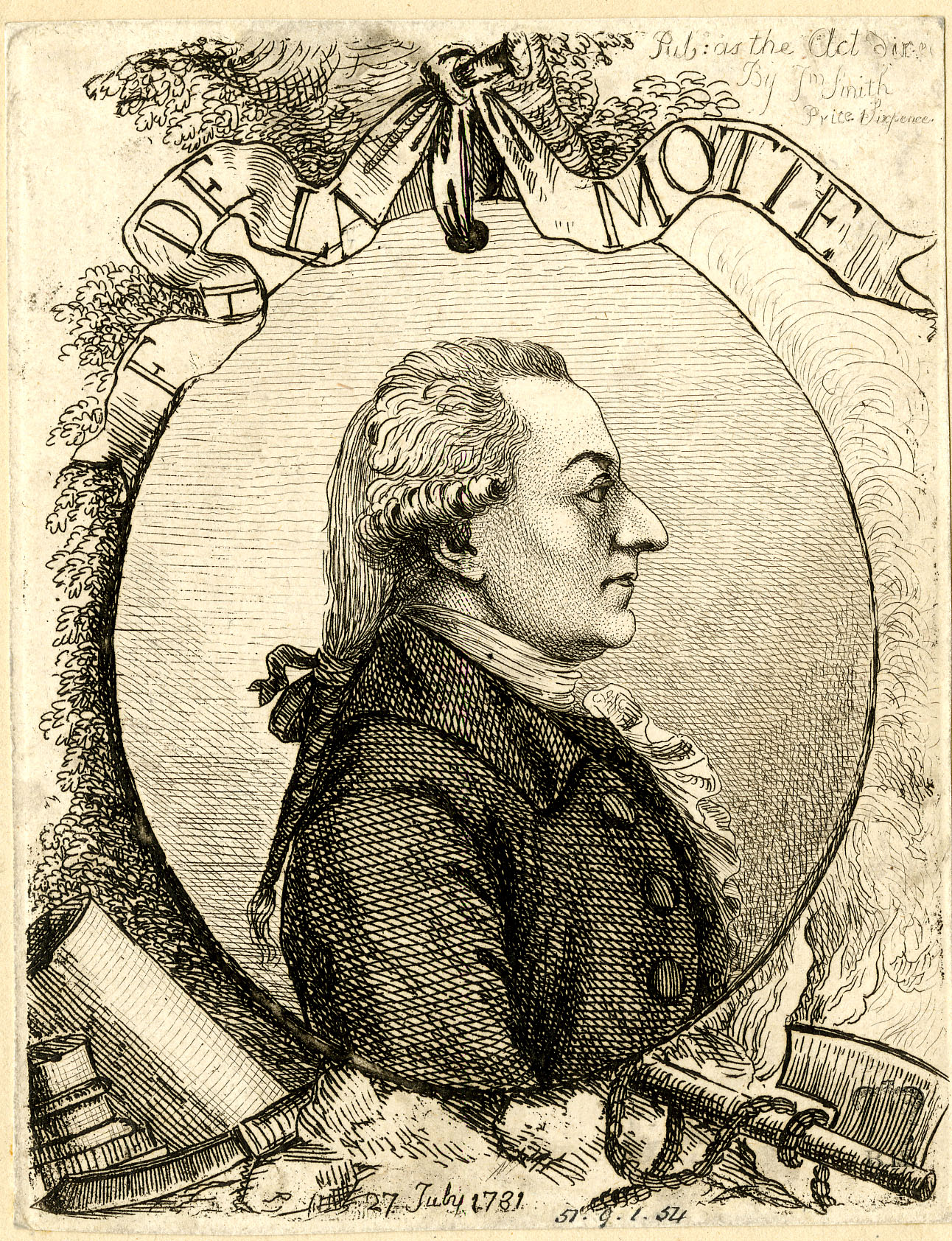

Francis Henry de la Motte, or François Henri de la Motte, was a French citizen and ex-French army officer executed in London for high treason on 27 July 1781. He had been arrested in January 1781 on suspicion of being a spy, and held for six months in the Tower of London. At an Old Bailey trial on 23 July, he was found guilty of running an operation which sent secret naval intelligence to France, which supported the rebelling American colonists and had been at war with Great Britain since 1778.

Specifically, the intelligence concerned British fleet dispositions at Portsmouth and other British ports. In July 1781, the American Revolutionary War had not ended and the navies of Great Britain and France were still fighting not only in the North Atlantic but as far as the Indian Ocean.

What sealed de la Motte's fate was the testimony of a former accomplice, Henry Lutterloh, who was the chief witness for the prosecution. Having been found guilty by the jury, the sentence was hanging, drawing and quartering. In fact de la Motte was spared some of the gruesome refinements — after hanging for nearly an hour, he was taken down and his heart cut out and burned. He was not quartered, nor subjected to the refinements visited on David Tyrie, a Scottish spy, the following year. Tyrie, whose trial was at Winchester, was also found guilty of sending naval intelligence to the French. He was hanged for twenty-two minutes, and then beheaded, emasculated and had his heart removed and burnt. He was put in a coffin by the undertaker and his servants and taken away.

Public executions were considered a spectator sport in the eighteenth century, and when individuals of high rank were involved the attraction was irresistible. It was not just the lower orders who turned up to witness these occasions A crowd of more than eighty thousand people witnessed de la Motte's execution at Tyburn.

== De la Motte in English Literature ==
De la Motte's life and execution resonated in the imagination of writers like Charles Dickens and W. M. Thackeray. The drama and language of the trial scene of Charles Darnay in A Tale of Two Cities is very close to that of de la Motte's trial, with Dickens emphasising the grotesqueness and the gruesomeness of the proceedings in his inimitable manner.

As for Thackeray, in his last, unfinished novel, Denis Duval we find de la Motte and his sometime accomplice, Henry Lutterloh, figuring there as leading characters. Thackeray portrays de la Motte as a tortured, demonic figure, which is not at all how he comes across in contemporary reports in the press. Still less is that the impression conveyed in a sympathetic memoir published by a French writer some time between the trial verdict and the execution — in the hope (perhaps) of mitigating the severity of the sentence.

The official trial report is known for its obtuse grammar. It includes single sentences of nearly 4000 words.
