= Samuel Conrad Schwach =

Norwegian newspaper publisher (c. 1731–1781)

- Born: c. 1731; Stettin, Prussia
- Died: 1781 (aged approx. 50); Christiania, Norway
- Known for: Founding the first Norwegian newspaper
- Spouse: Jessina Maria Jensdatter Ørbeck (m. 1758; died 1771)

Samuel Conrad Schwach (c. 1731–1781) was a Norwegian newspaper publisher. He founded the first Norwegian newspaper, Norske Intelligenz-Seddeler, which published its first issue on 25 May 1763. He is the grandfather of Norwegian jurist and author Conrad Nicolai Schwach.

== Early life ==
Samuel Conrad Schwach was born circa 1731 in Stettin, Prussia, present-day Poland. He graduated in 1747–1750 in Copenhagen as a printer and later moved to Norway in 1751 to work with printer Jens Andersen Berg in Christiania, present-day Oslo.

== Norske Intelligenz-Seddeler ==
Schwach founded the newspaper Norske Intelligenz-Seddeler, publishing its first issue on 25 May 1763. During the early years of Norske Intelligenz-Seddeler, Schwach only published advertisements and entertainment in the newspaper. In the 1770s, Schwach started to criticize the government in Norske Intelligenz-Seddeler. In protest of demands made by the amtmann to censor Norske Intelligenz-Seddeler, Schwach would make two pages empty in his next issue, which would land him a fine. He remained the editor of the newspaper until he died in 1781. After his death, his stepson, Jens Ørbek Berg, became the publisher of Norske Intelligenz-Seddeler. Norske Intelligenz-Seddeler went defunct in 1920 after being acquired by Verdens Gang.

== Personal life and death ==
Schwach married Jessina Maria Jensdatter Ørbeck, widow of Jens Andersen Berg, in 1758. Schwach had children with Jessina, priest Immanuel Schwach in 1760, and Johannes in 1762. Schwach is the grandfather of Norwegian jurist and author Conrad Nicolai Schwach, the son of Immanuel Schwach. He died in 1781 in Christiania, Norway.
