= Arve Arvesen =

Background information
- Born: 12 September 1869
- Origin: Hamar
- Died: 16 January 1951 (aged 81)
- Occupation: Violinist
- Formerly of: Gudbrand Bøhn

Arve Arvesen (12 September 1869 – 16 January 1951) was a Norwegian violinist from Hamar, in his time, considered the best in the country. He studied under Gudbrand Bøhn, as well as in Leipzig, Marsick in Paris and Eugene Ysaye in Brussels.

Following his debut in Oslo in 1891, he served as concertmaster in Helsinki (1895–97), Turku (1897–99), and Bergen (1899–1902). Arvesen worked as a teacher from 1905–1928 in Oslo and directed the Bergen Conservatory of Music from 1928 until his death in 1951. During his teaching career, he founded two music ensembles: the Oslo Kammermusikkforening (1917) to popularize Norwegian chamber music and Arvesen's Trio (1921) which performed throughout Norway, Sweden, and Denmark. He was the son of Olaus Arvesen.
