= HMS Kempenfelt =

Four ships of the Royal Navy have borne the name HMS Kempenfelt, after rear-admiral Richard Kempenfelt:

- HMS Kempenfelt (1915) was a Marksman-class flotilla leader launched in 1915 and sold for scrapping in 1921.
- HMS Kempenfelt (I18) was a C-class destroyer launched in 1931. She was transferred to the Royal Canadian Navy in 1939 and renamed HMCS Assiniboine (I18). She was wrecked in 1945, and the hulk was sold in 1952.
- HMS Kempenfelt (R03) was a W-class destroyer initially named HMS Valentine. She was launched in 1943, sold to the Yugoslav Navy in 1956, where she was named Kotor. She was withdrawn from service in 1971.
- HMS Kempenfelt was the proposed name for the V-class destroyer HMS Valentine, but she was renamed prior to her launch.
