= Juan Montón y Mallén =

Spanish composer

Juan Montón y Mallén (c. 1730 – December 1781, in Segovia) was a Spanish composer and maestro de capilla of Segovia Cathedral. He was succeeded by Pedro Aranaz y Vides.

== Works, editions and recordings ==
Editions

- Mass a 6. Arias and tonos with two violins.
- Mass a 8

Recordings

- Montón y Mallén Alienta, mortal, alienta Alicia Lázaro, NB
