= William Williams of Wern =

Welsh minister

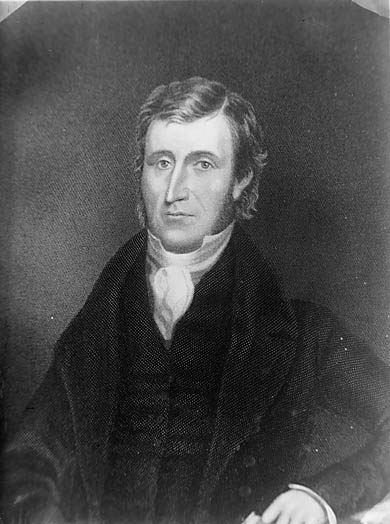
William Williams of Wern

William Williams of Wern (18 November 1781 (baptised) – 17 March 1840) was an Independent minister in Wales, and the promoter of the "General Union" movement of 1834. He was one of three "giants of the Welsh pulpit", along with John Elias and Christmas Evans.

Williams was born in Llanfachreth, Merionethshire. He became a member of the Old Chapel, Llanuwchllyn, at an early age, and became a student at the Wrexham Academy in 1803. He was ordained in 1808. In 1814 he attended a meeting of the London Missionary Society in Swansea, and proceeded to foster its aims in north Wales.

In 1834, he began the "General Union" movement, in order to help pay off the debts arising from the building of chapels.
