= Antonie Løchen =

Norwegian politician and women's rights activist

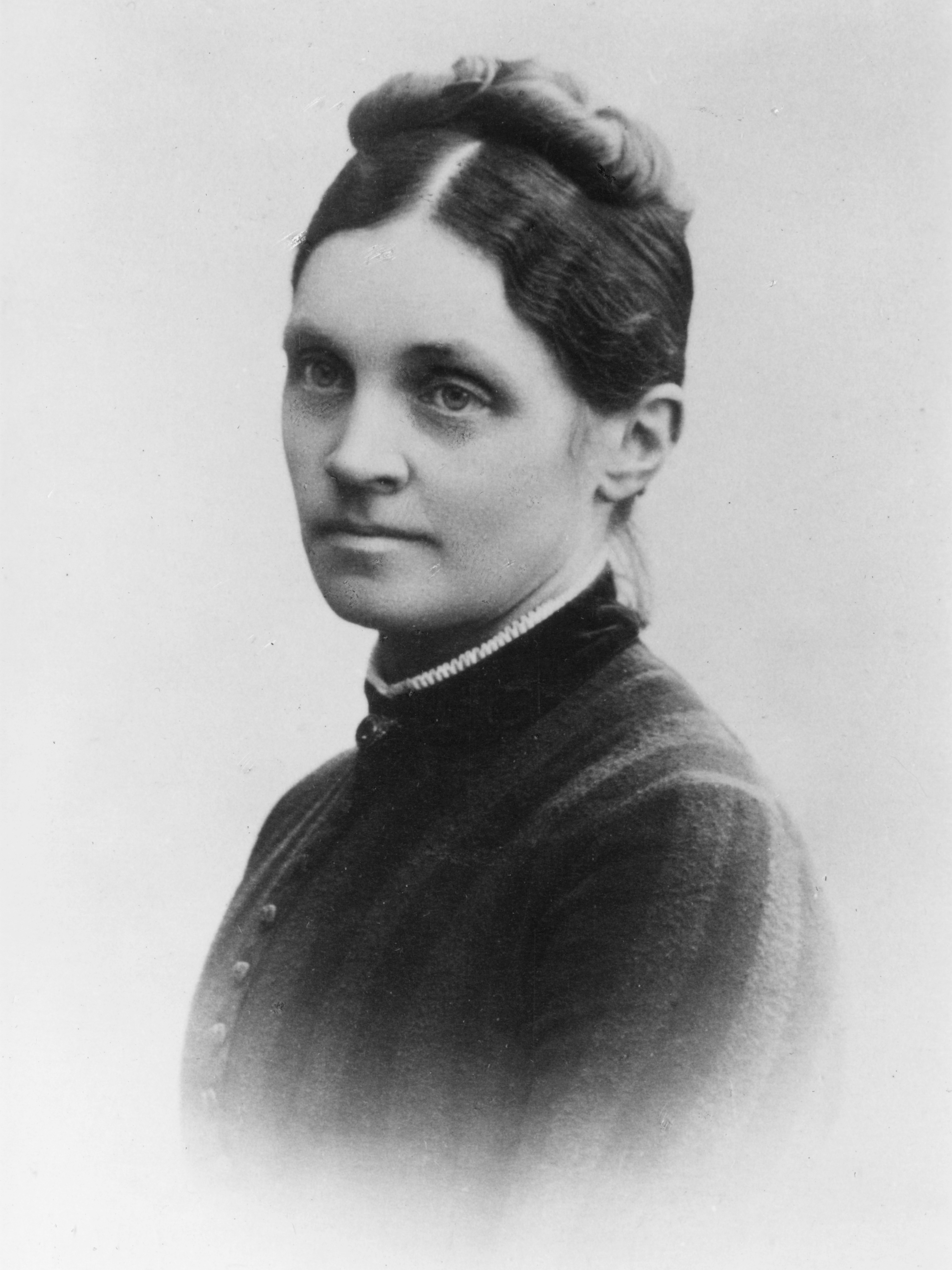
Antinie Løchen

Antinue Løchen (13 July 1850 — 30 April 1933) was a Norwegian liberal politician and a women's rights activist from Trondheim. She is recognized as the founder in 1885 of the city's women's association, Trondhjems Kvinnesaksforening, which she later chaired. Also involved in the leadership of the Norwegian Association for the Protection of Animals (Foreningen til Dyrenes Beskyttelse), in 1909 she published a children's book titled Smaahistorier om dyr (Short Stories about Animals). In 1901, she was one of the first women to be elected to the Trondheim City Council.

== Early life and family ==
Born in Inderøy Municipality on 13 July 1850, Antonie Løchen was the daughter of the factory owner Herman Løchen (1822–1876) and his wife Anne Margretha née Jenssen (1826–1911). She was raised in Sundnes as one of the family's many daughters. She had one brother, Håkon, who became a lawyer. In 1874, she married her cousin Olaf, a lawyer.

== Career ==
Løchen is considered to be the founder of Trondheim's Women's Association which was established during a meeting at her home on 20 January 1885. The first president was the banker Nicolay Jenssen but she was elected chair from 1887 to 1888 and from 1881 to 1892. In her first address to the association on 6 May 1885, she spoke about health and women's rights, emphasizing the need for exercise, a healthy diet and sensible clothing.

Together with her husband, Løchen became associated with the politics of the Liberals at the local level in Trondheim. She was the first woman to be elected to the city council. She is also remembered for her work in the Animal Protection Society (Foreningen til Dynrenes beskyttelse) which awarded her their silver medal in 1919. In 1909, she published the children's storybook Smaahistorier o dyr (Short Stories about Animals).

Antonie Løchen died on 30 April 1933 and was buried in Trondheim.
