= Élisabeth Lochen =

French film director

Élisabeth Löchen is a French filmmaker, and co-creator of the L.C. Concept ("Löchen-Chedville Concept") the French predecessor of the Digital Theater System.

Löchen has a PhD in psychology and entered the music industry after pursuing her academic interests.

== Sound system ==
In 1990, she was at the beginning with Pascal Chédeville of the L.C. Concept, the earliest in-theater digital sound system. L.C.Concept was first demonstrated in 1991 with an experimental re-release of the film Cyrano de Bergerac, directed by Jean-Paul Rappeneau. The first commercial release was done in late 1991 with the movie Until the End of the World, directed by Wim Wenders. Elisabeth Löchen worked on more than 30 films featuring a L.C.Concept soundtrack, including Basic Instinct, Cliffhanger, Silent Tongue, Heaven & Earth, The Lover, Arizona Dream, and Bitter Moon.

The L.C. Concept is now known worldwide as DTS (Digital Theater System).

In 1996 she moved to Los Angeles and traveled between two continents, consulting for digital sound companies, including DTS. She wrote her first scripts.

== Films ==
In 1999, Lochen wrote, produced and directed her award-winning short Red Ribbon . This short was released theatrically in Los Angeles, Orange County and Palm Springs. It was also screened before Beyond the Clouds directed by Michelangelo Antonioni and sold in Europe and Japan . In 1999, Elisabeth Löchen was invited as an American film director in France for the Deauville US Films Festival . While travelling a lot with “Red Ribbon” she produced and directed shorts and documentaries until 2004 when she was hired by Front Porch Films to direct her first US feature, “Dirt People” with David Paetkau, James Farentino, and Briana Lynn Brown .

In 2006 she wrote and directed “Christian” her first French feature with Annie Girardot, Yvon Martin, Charles Nemes, Patrick Béthune, and Christian Morin.

This movie won the "American awards winner" French movie for Best Director and Best Foreign movie, and was premiered on the Champs Elysées. It was released theatrically in France in November 2007 only with D-copies.
