= Battle of Ushant (1781) =

1781 battle of the American Revolutionary War

Second Battle of Ushant
- Part of the American Revolutionary War
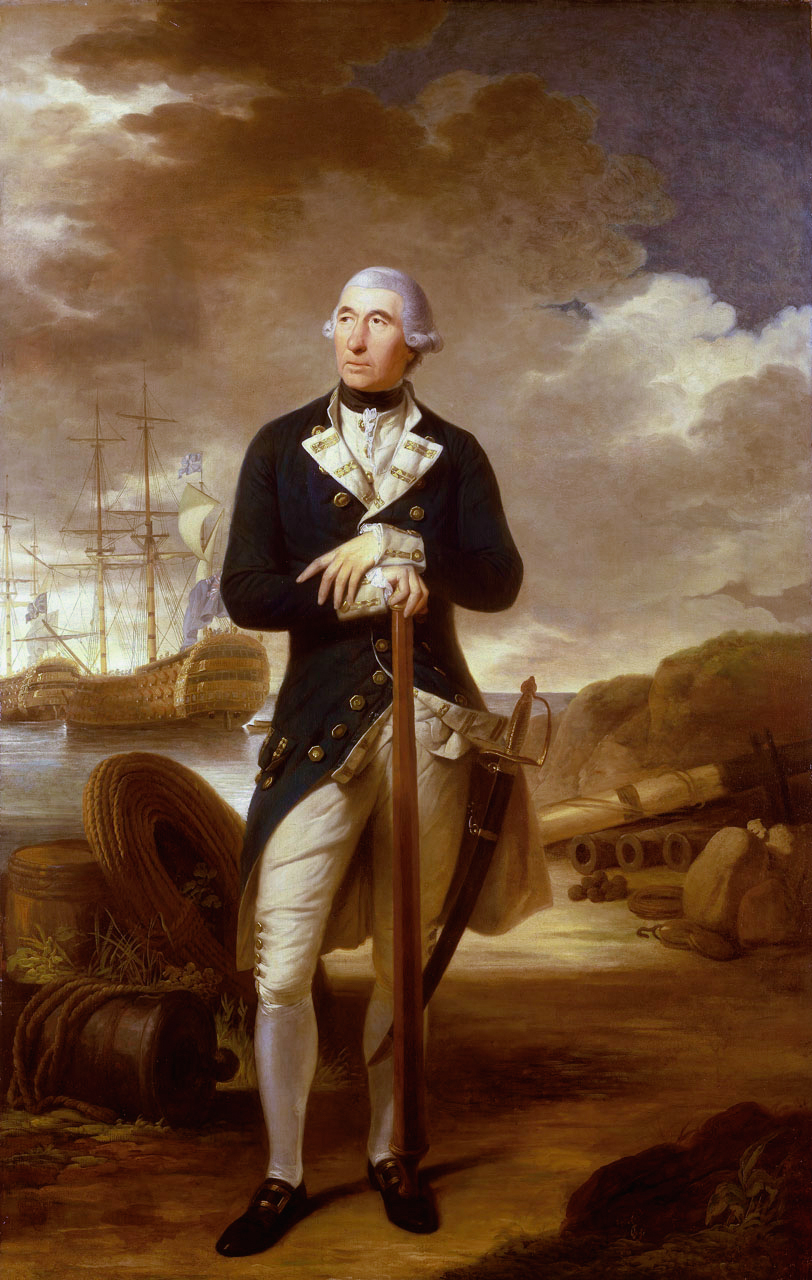
- A portrait of Richard Kempenfelt, Tilly Kettle
Date	12 December 1781
Location	Off Ushant, Bay of Biscay, Atlantic
Result	British victory

Belligerents
Great Britain	France

Commanders and leaders
Richard Kempenfelt	Comte de Guichen

Strength
12 ships of the line	19 ships of the line 110 transport ships

Casualties and losses
Light	1,620 captured 21 transport ships captured

The Second Battle of Ushant was a naval battle fought between French and British squadrons near Ushant, an island off the coast of Brittany, on 12 December 1781, as part of the American Revolutionary War.

== Background ==
On 10 December 1781, a French convoy sailed from Brest with reinforcements and stores for the East and West Indies, protected by a fleet of 19 ships of the line commanded by Luc Urbain du Bouëxic, comte de Guichen.

On 11 December 1781, Bussy-Castelnau departed Cadiz, Spain, with a squadron comprising the 64-gun Saint-Michel and the 74-gun Illustre, escorting three transports, to make his junction at Tenerife in the Canary Islands with Guichen's squadron.

The next day, they encountered a British squadron of ships of the line, commanded by Rear Admiral Richard Kempenfelt in HMS Victory, that had been ordered to sea to intercept the expected convoy.

== Action ==
On 12 December, Kempenfelt's squadron sighted the French convoy, discovering that its protective escort had been strengthened.

Initially, Guichen's fleet was situated downwind of the convoy, allowing the British ships to sweep down and capture 15 ships carrying troops and supplies before the French ships could intervene.

Kempenfelt's force was not strong enough to attack the 19 French escorts, but the French convoy, having deliberately risked setting sail in the North Atlantic storm season in an unsuccessful attempt to avoid British forces, was dispersed in a gale shortly afterwards, and most of the ships were forced to return to port.

== Aftermath ==
Only two of the ships of the line intended for the West Indies arrived with a few transport vessels in time for the Battle of the Saintes in April 1782.

When news of the battle at Ushant reached Britain, the Opposition in Parliament questioned the decision to send such a small force against the convoy and forced an official inquiry into the administration of the Royal Navy. This was the first of a succession of Opposition challenges that would ultimately bring about the fall of the government of Lord North on 20 March 1782 and pave the way for the Peace of Paris the following year, which ended the American Revolutionary War.

The French transports Marquis de Castries and Neptune-Royal, lone survivors of the convoy, reached Saint Croix carrying siege artillery and an artillery company.

== Sources ==
- Clowes, William Laird; Markham, Clements; Mahan, A. T.; Wilson, H. W.; Roosevelt, Theodore; Laughton, L. Carr (1898). The Royal Navy: A History – From the Earliest Times to the Present. Vol. 3. London: Sampson Low, Marston and Company.
- Cunat, Charles (1852). Histoire du Bailli de Suffren. Rennes: A. Marteville et Lefas. p. 447.
