= Hjalmar Løken =

Norwegian jurist and newspaper editor (1852–1932)

Hjalmar Løken (31 October 1852 – 1932) was a Norwegian jurist and newspaper editor.

== Personal life ==
Hjalmar Løken was born in Vang Municipality in Hedmark county as the son of cand.jur. Edvard Martin Løchen and his wife Anne Elisabeth Grøtting. He was a brother of painter and actor Kalle Løchen, County Governor of Hedmark Thorvald Løchen, politician and Minister of Justice and the Police Einar Løchen, and philosopher Arne Løchen. He married his cousine, writer and feminist Olaug Løken in 1881.

== Professional career ==
Løken graduated as cand.jur. in 1876. He was a lawyer in Christiania from 1879, and a lawyer of the Supreme Court of Norway from 1883. He was editor-in-chief for the Trondheim newspaper Dagsposten from 1885 to 1890, and of Norske Intelligenssedler from 1890 to 1918.
