= Richard Kempenfelt =

Royal Navy officer (1718–1782)

Rear-Admiral Richard Kempenfelt
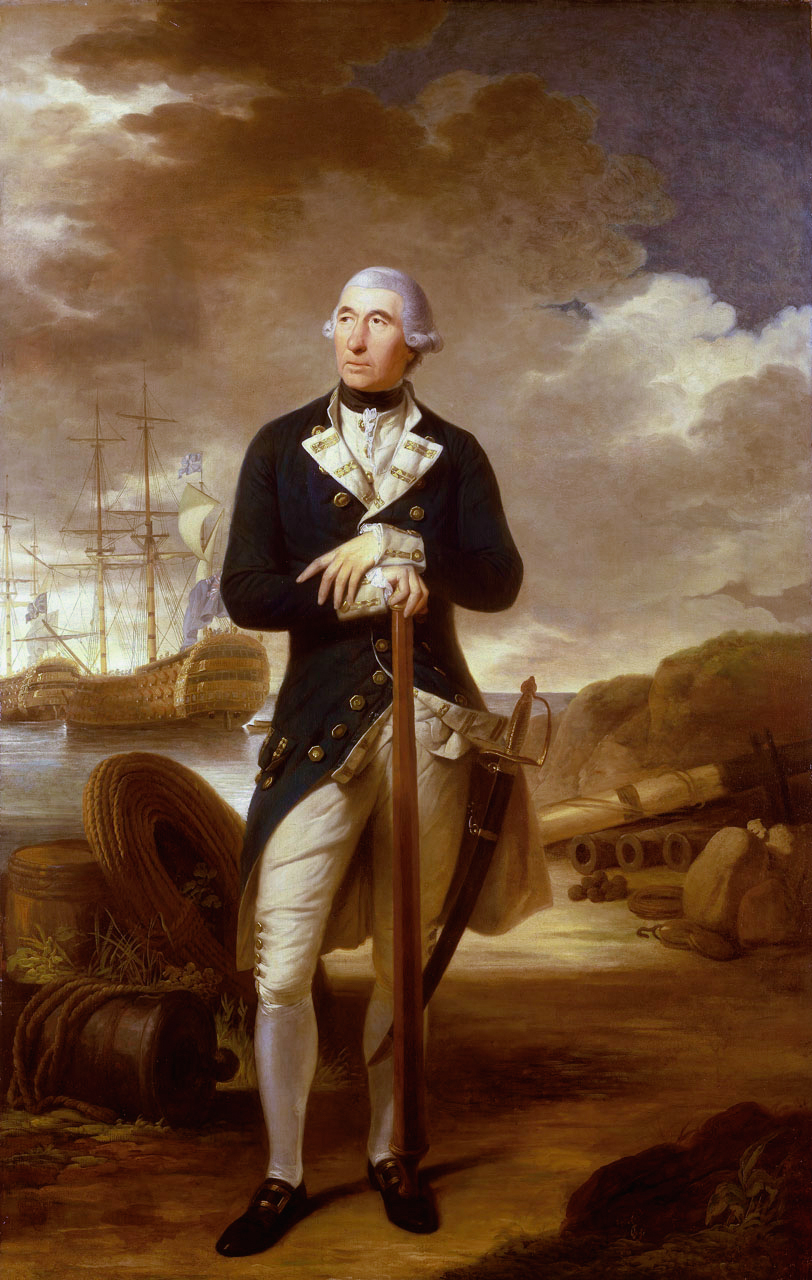
- Portrait by Tilly Kettle, 1782
- Born: 1718; Westminster, London
- Died: 29 August 1782; Spithead, Hampshire
- Military career
- Allegiance: Great Britain
- Branch: Royal Navy
- Service years: c. 1739–1782
- Rank: Rear-admiral
- Commands: HMS Lightning; HMS Elizabeth; HMS Queenborough; HMS Grafton; HMS Norfolk; Governor of Cavite; HMS Buckingham; HMS Alexander
- Conflicts: War of the Austrian Succession; Battle of Porto Bello (1739); Battle of Cartagena de Indias; Seven Years' War; Action of 29 April 1758; Battle of Negapatam (1758); Siege of Madras; Battle of Pondicherry; Siege of Pondicherry (1760); Battle of Manila (1762); American Revolutionary War; Armada of 1779; Battle of Ushant (1781)

Rear-Admiral Richard Kempenfelt (1718 – 29 August 1782) was a Royal Navy officer best known for his victory at the Battle of Ushant in 1781 and dying when HMS Royal George accidentally sank at Portsmouth the following year.

== Background ==
Richard Kempenfelt was born in Westminster, London in 1718. He was the son of Magnus Kempenfelt and his wife Ann Hunt. Magnus, a Swede, was a British Army officer.

== Naval career ==
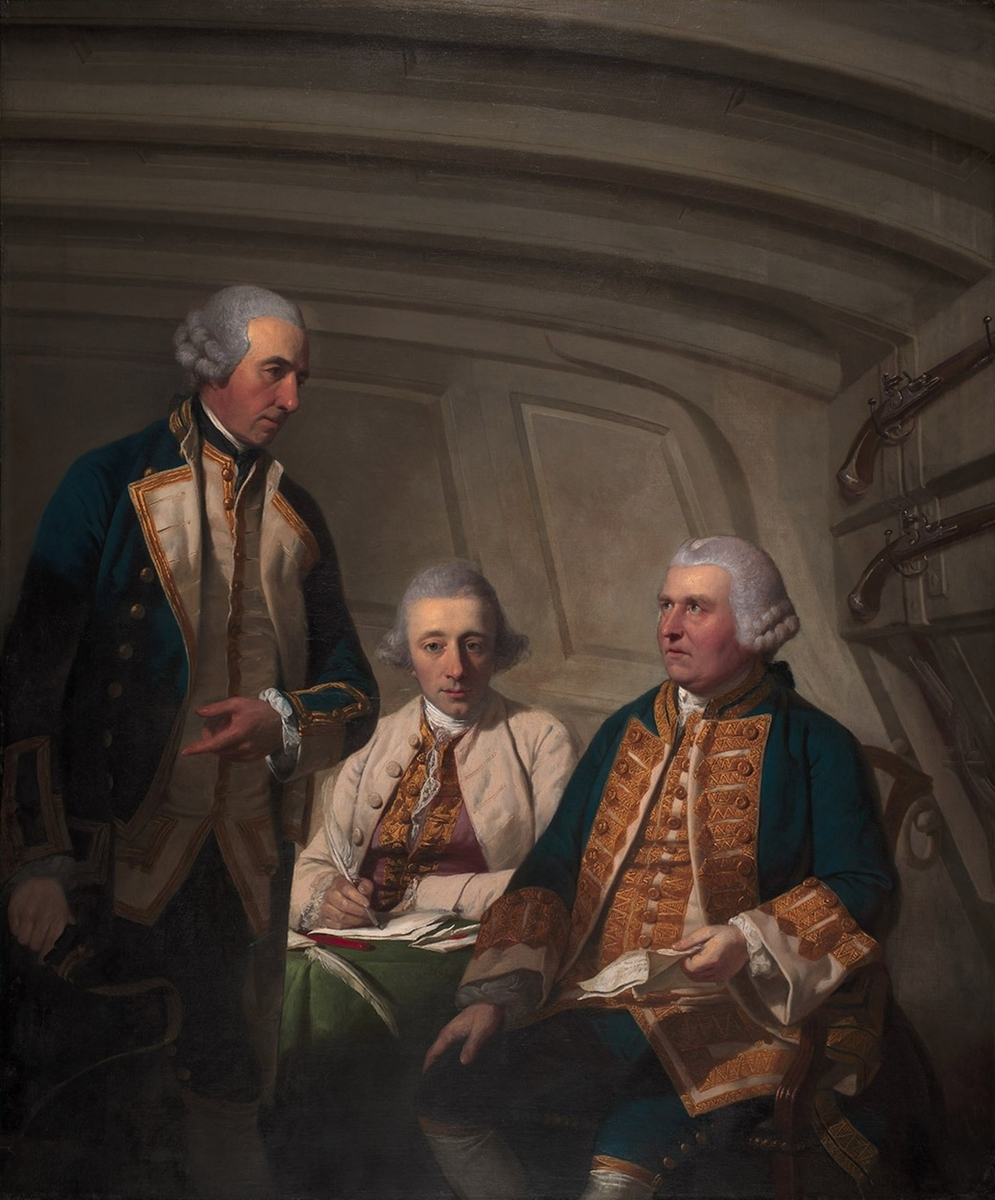
Kempenfelt (left) receiving orders from Sir Samuel Cornish (right) onboard HMS Norfolk during the Battle of Manila in 1762

Richard Kempenfelt was commissioned a lieutenant in January 1741. He saw service in the West Indies, taking part in the capture of Portobelo during the War of Jenkins' Ear. In 1746 he returned to Britain, and from then until 1780, when he was made rear admiral, he saw active service in the East Indies with Sir George Pocock and in various quarters of the world.

In 1779 he was made Chief of Staff or Captain of the Fleet under Admiral Sir Charles Hardy on HMS Victory which was to lead a hastily assembled fleet to oppose an invasion of England set to begin with the destruction of the Portsmouth naval base by the French and Spanish Armada of 1779. In 1781 he won the Battle of Ushant, with a vastly inferior force, defeating the French fleet under Guichen and capturing 20 ships.

== Royal George ==
In 1782 he hoisted his flag on HMS Royal George, which formed part of the fleet under Lord Howe. In August this fleet was ordered to proceed to the relief of Gibraltar, and underwent a refit at top speed at Portsmouth.

On 29 August 1782, Royal George was being heeled off Portsmouth to allow repairs to be made to the water intake for the deck wash pump, which was three feet below water level. The larboard guns had been run out and the starboard guns moved into the centre of the deck to heel over the ship until her lowest gun ports were close to the surface of the water. A supply vessel, Lark, approached Royal George on her low side to transfer a cargo of rum. According to an Admiralty report – not made public until early the next century – the larboard cannons' weight on the ship's central frame caused excessively decayed timbers to break. This caused the ship to heel to such a degree that the sea washed in at her gunports, and she soon began to ship water in her hold. A sudden breeze on the raised side of the ship forced her further over and the water rushed in. The crew were ordered to right the ship but the fallen cannon could not be moved. Within a couple of minutes she rolled on to her side and sank before any distress signal could be given.

Nine hundred people were estimated to have lost their lives, for besides the crew there were a large number of tradesmen and women and children on board. About 230 people were saved, some by running up the rigging, while others were picked up by boats from other vessels. The usual assumption is that Kempenfelt was writing in his cabin when the ship sank; the cabin doors had jammed due to the ship heeling, and he perished with the rest. However, rival scenarios were reported at the time, as described in historian Hilary L. Rubinstein's book on the sinking, published in 2021. William Cowper’s poem the "Loss of the Royal George" was based on the report that the admiral was trapped writing in his cabin, so that is the scenario which prevailed to the exclusion of other reports circulating at the time. Kempenfelt had effected radical alterations and improvements in the signalling system then existing in the British Navy. A painting of the loss of Royal George is in the Royal United Services Institute, London.

Kempenfelt took a great interest in evangelism. His hymns were published in Original Hymns and Poems by "Philotheorus" (Exeter, England: B. Thorn, 1777), dedicated to the Methodist John William Fletcher. It was reprinted in 1861 with a preface by Daniel Sedgwick.

== Memorials ==
A memorial to Kempenfelt, by the sculptor John Bacon, was placed in the Chapel of St Michael Westminster Abbey in 1808. Kempenfelt Bay on Lake Simcoe in Ontario, Canada, is named for him, and a number of warships have been named HMS Kempenfelt. LMS Jubilee Class locomotive 5662 (later numbered 45662 under British Railways) was named after Kempenfelt.

A 1768 painting of Kempenfelt, along with his fellow mariners Sir Samuel Cornish, 1st Baronet and Thomas Parry went on permanent display at Queen's House in Greenwich in Autumn 2022. The painting is by the artist Tilly Kettle and was purchased by the National Maritime Museum, with assistance from the Society for Nautical Research.
