= Norske Intelligenz-Seddeler =

Norwegian newspaper (1763–1920)

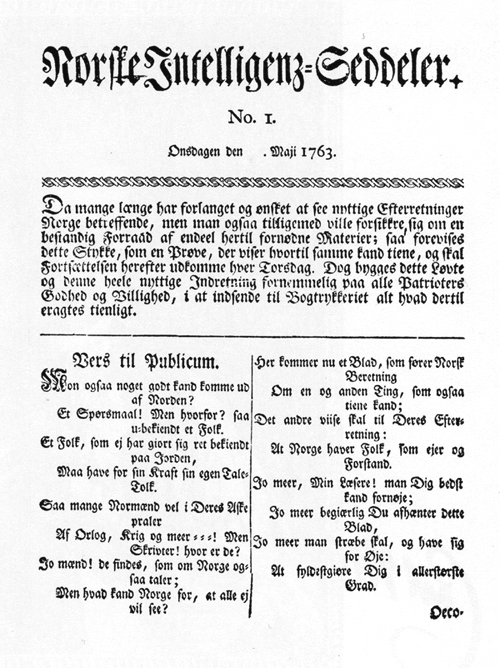
- First issue, 25 May 1763
- Type: newspaper
- Founded: 1763
- Political alignment: Liberal Party (1890-1918)
- Language: Norwegian

Norske Intelligenz-Seddeler is a former Norwegian newspaper issued in Oslo from 1763 to 1920. It was the first newspaper in Norway, and its first issue came out on 25 May 1763.

The founder and first publisher of Norske Intelligenz-Seddeler was printer Samuel Conrad Schwach, who edited the newspaper until he died in 1781. In the beginning, the publication was a weekly magazine. Its content was mainly advertisements and entertaining articles. The newspaper was called Christiania Intelligenssedler from 1807 to 1893. Beginning in 1814, it started covering political events by publishing articles from various contributors. Starting in 1830, it became a daily publication.

The publication was bought by the orphanage Christiania Opfostringshus in 1815. This institution was given special privileges by the government in 1816 related to printing official notices. Announcements regarding the city of Christiania were not paid for, but other notices became an important source of income over the years. Among the editors of the newspaper were teacher Anton Schjøth from 1834 to 1857, educator and writer Siegwart Petersen from 1861 to 1878, and literary historian Hartvig Lassen from 1880 to 1883. The privileges on official notices ended in 1882, when the official Norsk Kundgjørelsestidende took over these tasks, and Norske Intelligenz-Seddeler started focusing more on its role as a newspaper. From 1890 to 1918, it was published and edited by jurist Hjalmar Løken. During his period, it was an independent political newspaper which supported the Liberal Party and played a significant role in the political debate. In 1920, the newspaper was acquired by Verdens Gang.
