= Olaus Arvesen =

Norwegian educator and politician (1830–1917)

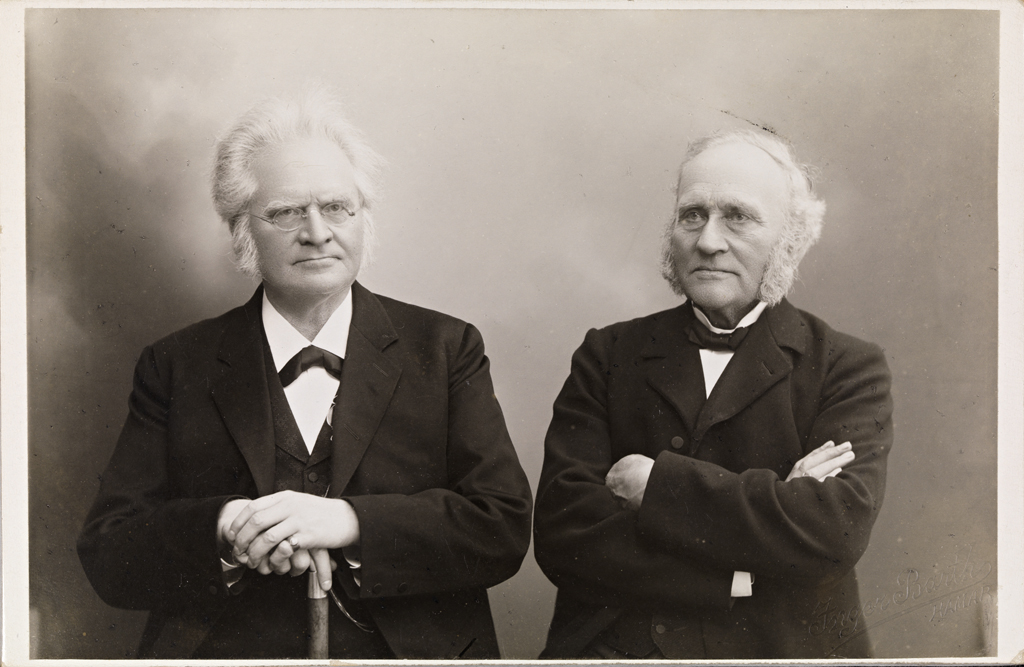
Olaus Arvesen (right) with Bjørnstjerne Bjørnson

Olaus Arvesen (26 September 1830 – 1 July 1917) was a Norwegian educator and politician for the Liberal Party.

He was born in Onsøy. He graduated as cand.theol. in 1862, and was influenced by the pastor and educator N. F. S. Grundtvig. While Grundtvig is often called "the father of the folk high school", Arvesen established Norway's first folk high school at Sagatun in 1864, together with Herman Anker.

Arvesen was also editor-in-chief of the newspapers Hamar Stiftstidende (from 1866) and Oplandenes Avis (from 1872). He was elected to the Norwegian Parliament in 1892, representing the constituency Hedemarkens Amt. He was a deputy representative during the term 1985–1897. In 1900, he was elected for a second term, representing the constituency of Sarpsborg where he lived while working as a Supreme Court barrister. In 1884 he was a co-founder of the Norwegian Association for Women's Rights.

He died in 1917. He was the father of violinist Arve Arvesen.
