= Gudrun Løchen Drewsen =

Norwegian-American women's rights activist

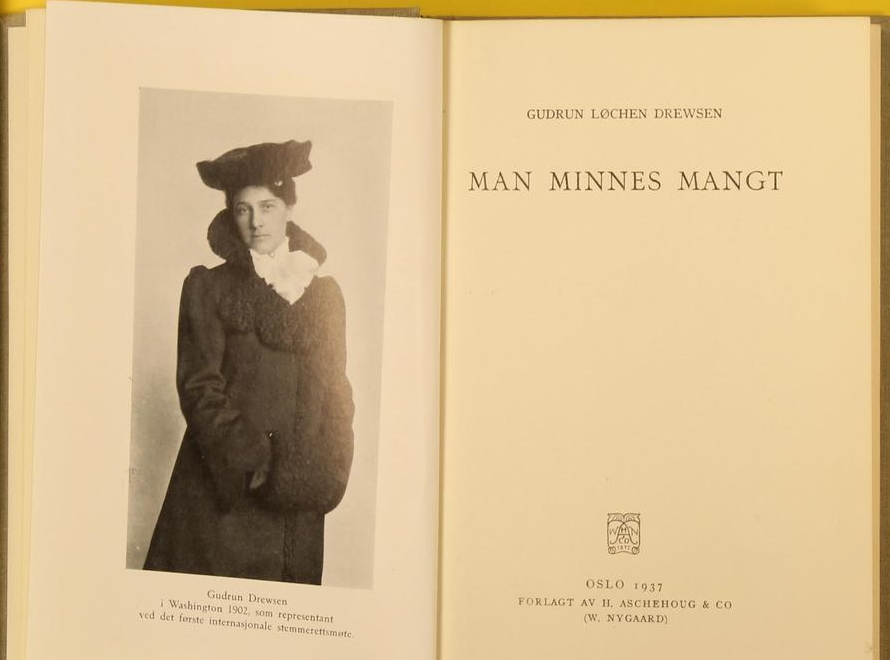
Title pages of Drewsen's book Man Minnes Mangt with a photograph of the author

Gudrun Løchen Drewsen (1867–1946) was a Norwegian-born American women's rights activist and painter. A competent organizer and strategist, she was one of the founders and principal figures in New York's Norwegian Suffrage League. She contributed effectively to the American suffrage cause after Norwegian women were granted voting rights in 1913. As a painter, she participated in Oslo's national art exhibition in 1890.

== Biography ==
She was born on 5 May 1867 on an estate in Inderøy Municipality, Norway. Gudrun Løchen was the daughter of Herman Løchen, a parliamentarian, (1822–1876) and Anna Margrethe Jenssen (1826–1911). The family's 10th child, she was born at a time when her parents were not as prosperous as they had been earlier. After her father died when she was nine, she lived with various relatives, receiving private tuition while living with an uncle in Trondheim until he too experienced economic difficulties. By contrast, her brothers were able to pursue their studies in Christiania (now Oslo). She also moved to the capital later, living with her mother-in-law while studying painting with Erik Werenskiold, Christian Krogh and Hans Heyerdahl. While in Christiania, she met the successful chemist Viggo Beutner Drewsen (1858–1930), whom she married in 1887.

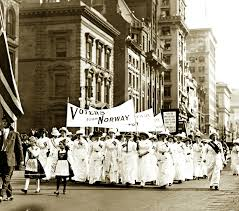
Gudrun Løchen Drewsen (right) leading Norwegian-born suffragettes in New York (1911)

In 1894, the family moved to New York where she was initially occupied as a housewife and a mother. In 1902, the Norwegian women's rights activist Fredrikke Qvam asked Drewsen to represent Norway at the Washington Suffrage Conference. After speaking at the conference and meeting the leading figures there, she went on to become the internationally recognized coordinator of Norwegian-American interests in the women's movement.

Drewsen proved to be an efficient organizer and strategist, recruiting new members, planning signature campaigns and participating in demonstrations on Manhattan's Fifth Avenue. By 1911, she had founded and become president of New York's Norwegian Suffrage League which marched under the banner "Voters from Norway" as a result of the limited voting rights Norwegian women had achieved in 1907. From 1913, when Norwegian women were granted voting rights, Drewsen became even more effective.

After American women obtained voting rights in 1920, she retired to Larchmont, New York. After her husband's death in 1930, she moved to live with a daughter in San Francisco where she died on 16 May 1946.

== Works ==
In 1937, Drewsen published her autobiography Man minnes mangt (transl. Many Are Remembered).
