= Hamar Stiftstidende =

Norwegian daily newspaper

Hamar Stiftstidende is a former Norwegian daily newspaper, published in Hamar, Norway from 1847 to 1971. Its original name was Hamar Budstikke, later Hamar Budstikke og Stiftstidende, then Hamar Stiftstidende. In 1872 editor Olaus Arvesen was forced to leave after disagreements with the owners, and started the competing Oplandenes Avis. Hamar Stiftstidende was a supporter for the Conservative Party, and later also the Liberal Left Party. The newspaper merged with Oplandenes Avis in 1916. In 1971 the newspaper was bankrupt.
