= Dagsposten =

Norwegian newspaper

- Type: newspaper
- Founded: 1877
- Political alignment: Liberal (1877–1909); Free-minded Liberal (1909–1940)
- Language: Norwegian
- Headquarters: Nidaros

Dagsposten ("Daily Mail") was a Norwegian newspaper, published in Trondheim in Sør-Trøndelag county.

== History and profile ==
Dagsposten was started on 2 October 1877 by Olai Olsen. He chose a connection with the liberal politician Johan Sverdrup, who later founded the Liberal Party. It soon became the largest newspaper in Central Norway. From 1886 to 1890 Hjalmar Løken was editor, and from 1890 to 1902 Håkon Løken was editor. After a conflict with the owners, who wanted a Coalition Party connection, Løken left and founded Nidaros. H. O. Oppedal took over. In 1909 Dagsposten became affiliated with the Liberal Left Party. Gerhard Jynge was editor from 1914 to 1917. In 1917 Johannes Knudsen took over as editor, and in 1940 he affiliated the newspaper with the Fascist party Nasjonal Samling. During this period the paper was financed by the Nazi regime in Germany.

After a while it was allowed to remove the sub-header "Organ for Nasjonal Samling", which had caused a loss of advertisement and discrediting among the populace. It was abruptly stopped when the Second World War ended in Norway on 8 May 1945.
