= Kalle Løchen =

Norwegian painter and actor (1865–1893)

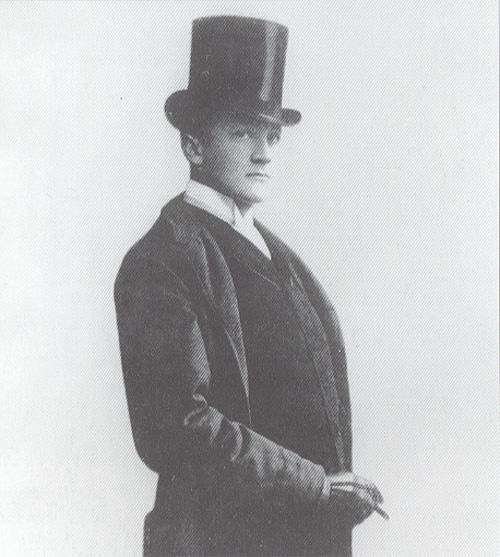
- Løchen, ca. 1890
- Born: 9 May 1865; Faaberg, Norway
- Died: 20 November 1893 (aged 28); Ekeberg, Norway
- Education: Norwegian National Academy of Craft and Art Industry
- Spouse: Anna Løchen

Kalle Løchen (9 May 1865 – 20 November 1893) was a Norwegian painter and actor.

== Biography ==
Kalle Løchen was born in Fåberg Municipality (now part of Lillehammer Municipality), in Christians amt (county), Norway, the son of cand.jur. Edvard Martin Løchen and his wife Anne Elisabeth Grøtting. He was a brother of Arne Løchen, Einar Løchen and Hjalmar Løken. Løchen took middle school examination in 1881. He apprenticed with Wilhelm von Hanno and Knud Bergslien.

He also studied with Julius Middelthun at The Royal Drawing School. During 1883–1884, he was trained by Christian Krohg and Frits Thaulow at an open air academy in Modum Municipality. In 1889, he was a pupil of Léon Bonnat in Paris. Kalle Løchen debuted at the Autumn Exhibition in 1883.

As an actor, he performed Hamlet at the National Theatre and also played Oswald in the Norwegian premiere of Ghosts. He was also associated with both the Tivoli and Carl Johan Theatre in Oslo. In 1886, he had married the actress, Anna Brun.

He is represented in the National Gallery of Norway with the paintings Fra Kongshavn bad from 1882, Malerskolens atelier på Modum from 1883, and a portrait of Cecilie Thoresen Krog from 1885.

On 18 March 1892, his wife, Anna Løchen died and he fell into a deep depression. His daughters Esther and Nanna were sent to live with extended family. Løchen began to drink heavily and in May 1892, he quit the theatre and left Bergen. In 1893, he returned to Eastern Norway, and after a summer stay with his sister Helene in Sollia, he went to Kristiania where he began an engagement at the newly opened Carl Johan Theatre. Later that year, he was briefly engaged to actress Anna Nielsen, but struggled emotionally with the loss of his wife the year prior and his separation from his daughters. On 20 November 1893, Løchen committed suicide by gunshot in the forest in the Oslo neighborhood of Ekeberg.

== Gallery ==
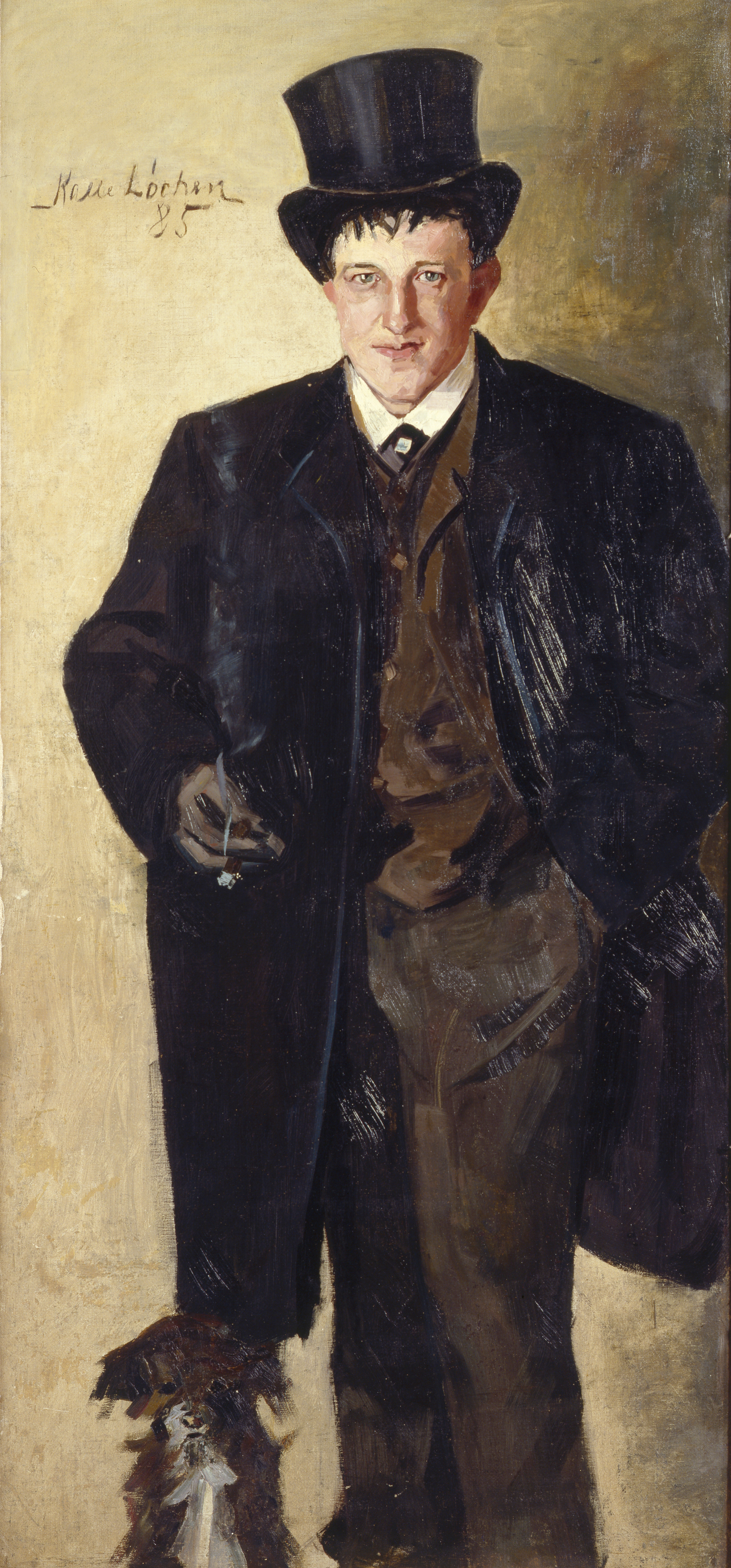
Self-portrait (1885)

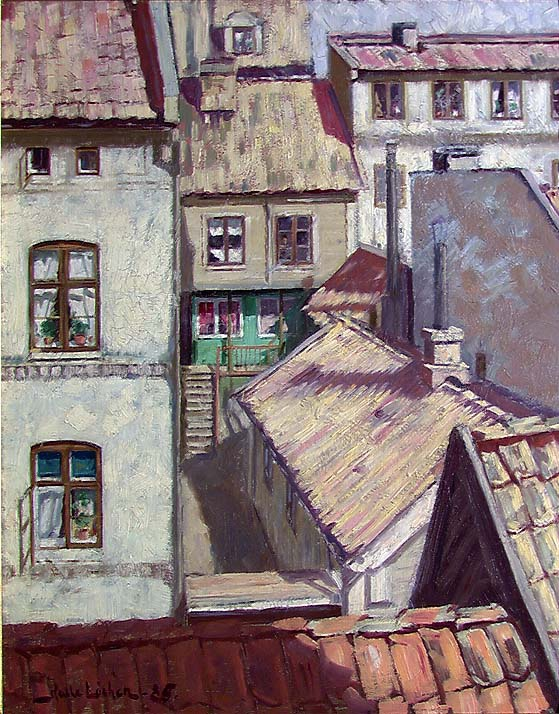
Housetops (1885)

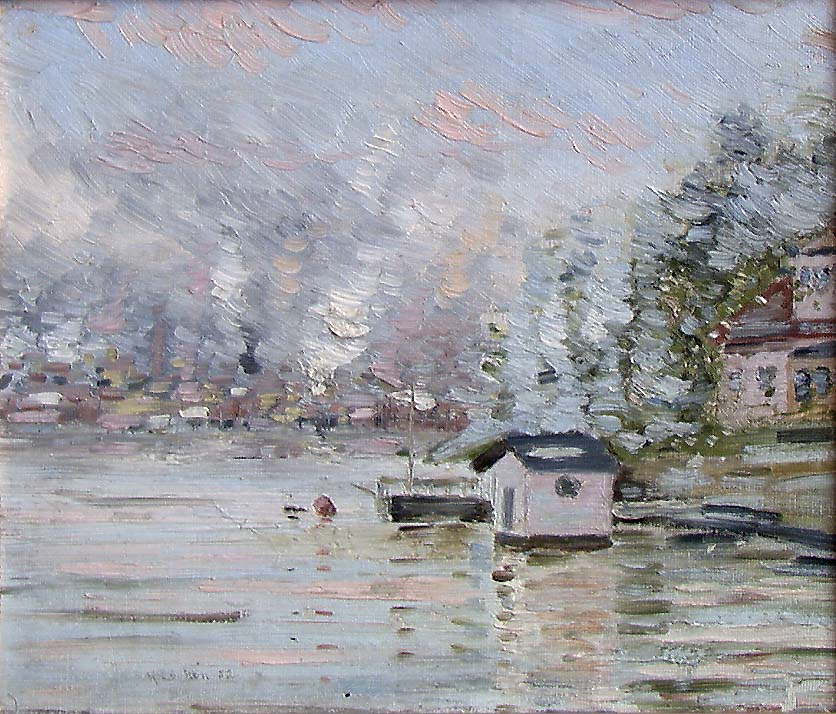
Baths at Kongshavn (1882)

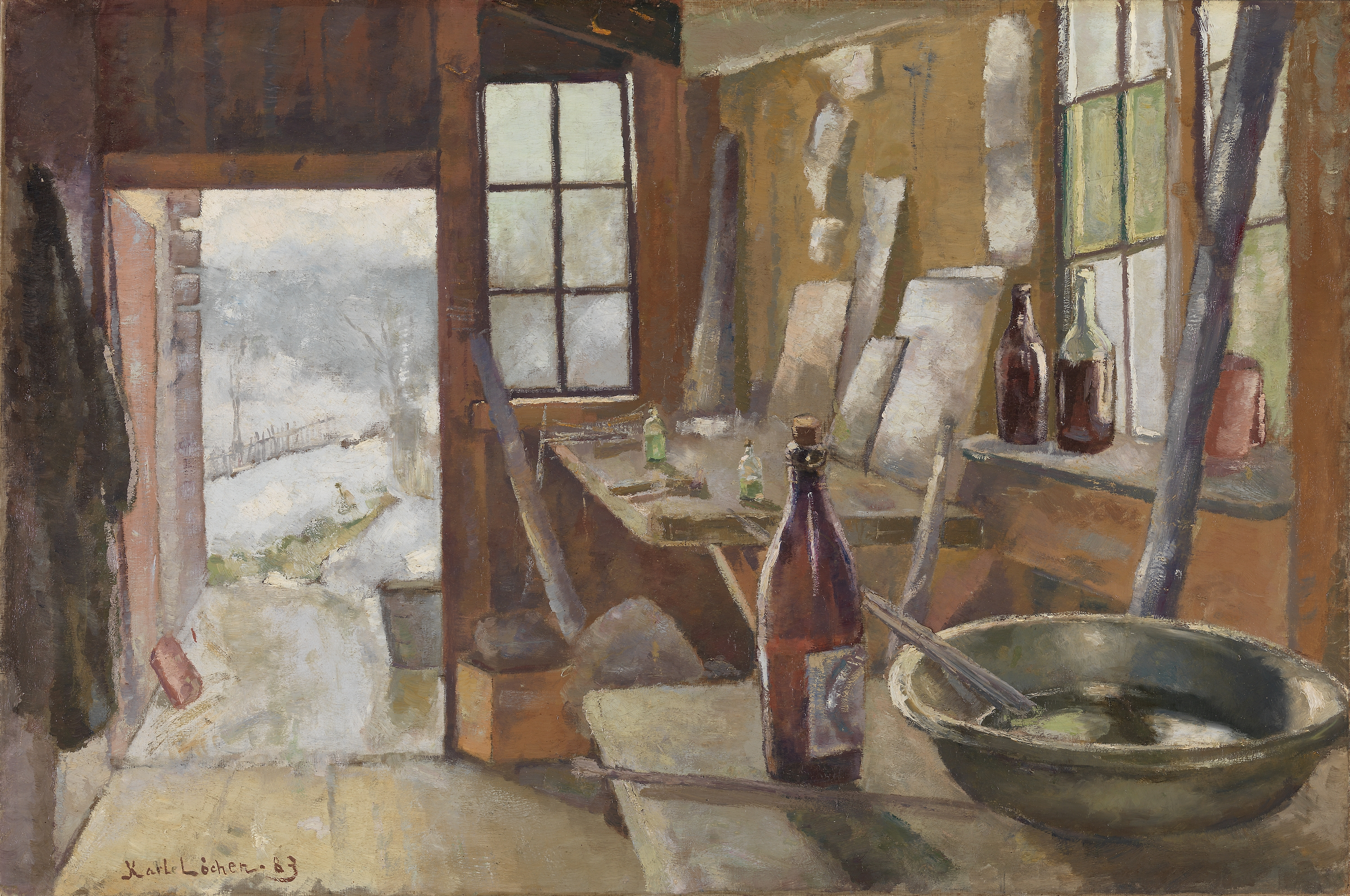
Painting School Studio, Modum (1883)

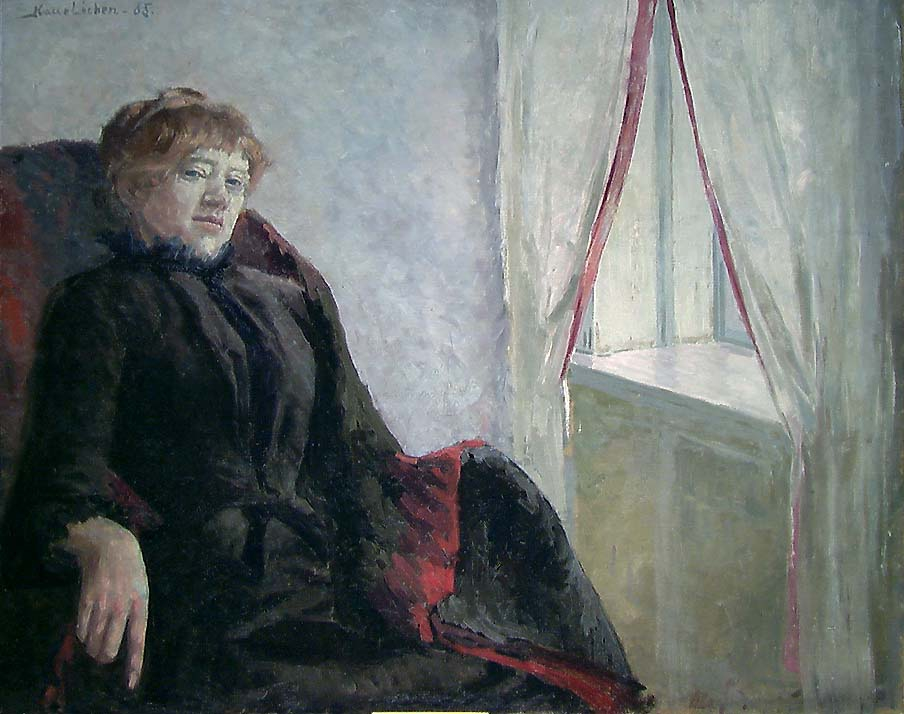
Cecilie Thoresen Krog (1885)

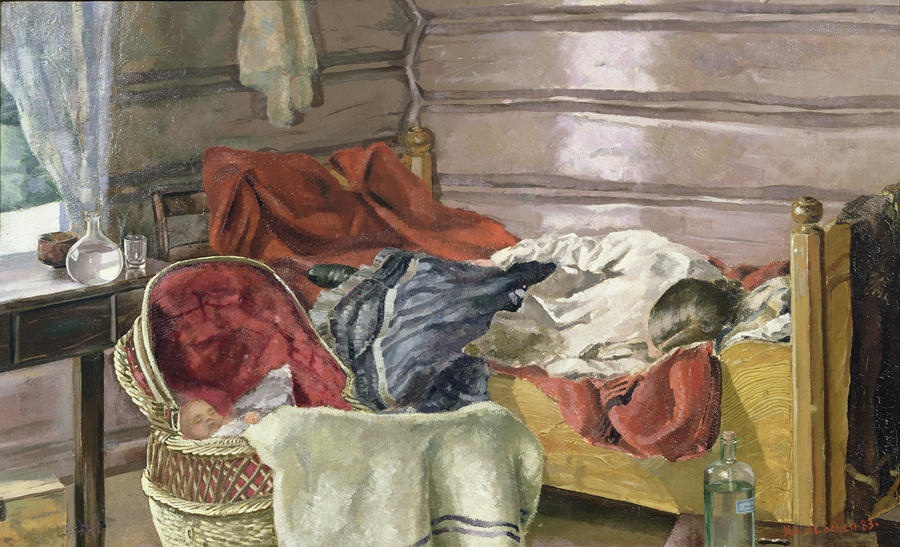
After a Sleepless Night (1893)

== Other sources ==
- Løchen, Rolf (1965) Kalle Løchen : en kunstner i "Bohèmetiden (Oslo: Aschehoug)
