= Håkon Løken =

Norwegian jurist, journalist, newspaper editor and non-fiction writer

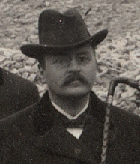
- Løken in 1901
- Born: 9 November 1859; Inderøy Municipality, Norway
- Died: 10 September 1923 (aged 63)
- Occupations: Jurist, journalist, newspaper editor and non-fiction writer

Håkon Løken (9 November 1859 – 10 September 1923) was a Norwegian jurist, journalist, newspaper editor and non-fiction writer. He was a journalist for the newspaper Dagsposten from 1890 to 1902. He founded the newspaper Nidaros in 1902, and was its chief editor from 1902 to 1910. From 1910 to 1918 he served as a public prosecutor.
