= Einar Løchen =

Norwegian jurist and politician

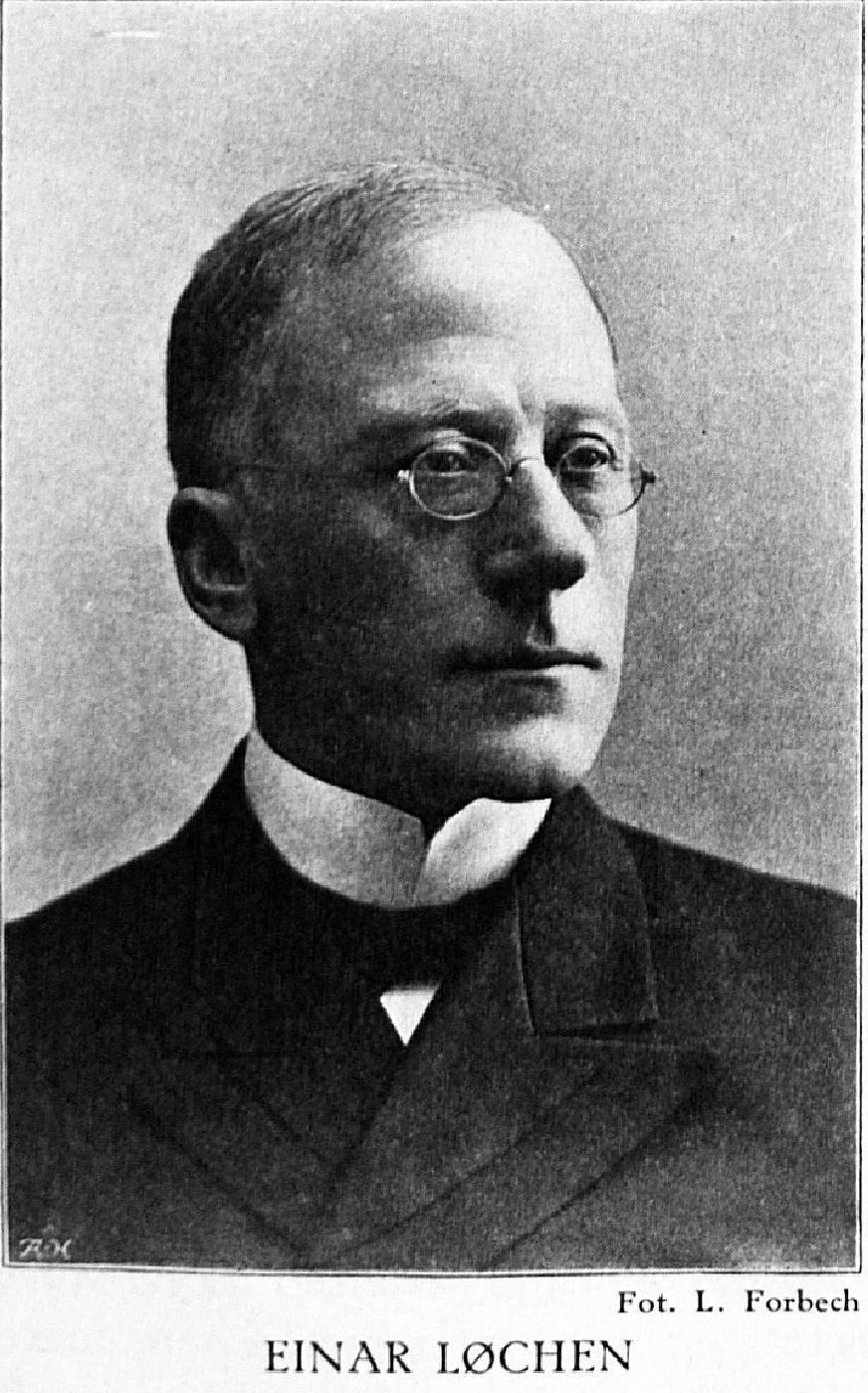

Chief Justice of the Supreme Court
- In office 7 November 1900 – 27 November 1908
- Preceded by: Morten Lambrechts
- Succeeded by: Karenus K. Thinn

Minister of Justice
- In office 29 April 1899 – 6 November 1900
- Prime Minister: Johannes Steen
- Preceded by: Ole Anton Qvam
- Succeeded by: Ole Anton Qvam

Member of the Council of State Division
- In office 17 February 1898 – 29 April 1899 Serving with Hans Nysom
- Prime Minister: Johannes Steen
- Preceded by: Thomas von Westen Engelhart
- Succeeded by: Jørgen Løvland; Georg A. Thilesen

Personal details
- Born: 2 November 1850 Vang, Oppland, Sweden-Norway
- Died: 27 November 1908 (aged 58) Kristiania, Norway
- Party: Liberal
- Spouse: Ragnfrid Berg (m. 1882)

Einar Løchen (2 November 1850 – 27 November 1908) was a Norwegian jurist and politician for the Liberal Party.

He was a member of the Council of State Division in Stockholm from February 1898 to April 1899. Then, he was appointed Minister of Justice and the Police in the second cabinet Steen. Løchen left this post in 1900, to become the ninth Chief Justice of the Supreme Court of Norway, a post he held until his death.

Legal offices
Preceded by Ole Anton Qvam	Norwegian Minister of Justice and the Police; 1899–1900	Succeeded by Ole Anton Qvam
Preceded by Morten Lambrechts	Chief Justice of the Supreme Court of Norway; 1900–1908	Succeeded by Karenus Kristofer Thinn
