= List of public art in the London Borough of Hounslow =

This is a list of public art in the London Borough of Hounslow.

== Bedfont ==
Image	Title / subject	Location and coordinates	Date	Artist / designer	Type	Designation	Notes
	Topiary	Church of St Mary the Virgin 51°27′5.46″N 0°26′24.73″W	1704		Topiary	—N/a	
	Bedfont War Memorial	Grovestile Way, East Bedfont 51°27′5.54″N 0°26′7.24″W			Pillar	—N/a	
	Wooden owl sculpture on bench	Bedfont Lakes Country Park			Sculpture	—N/a	

== Brentford ==
Image	Title / subject	Location and coordinates	Date	Artist / designer	Type	Designation	Notes
	Lion Gate	Syon House, London Road 51.47981°N 0.31901°W	18th century	Robert Adam	Statue	Grade I on 15 June 1951	
	Coat of arms of Middlesex	On Kew Bridge (see also under Richmond upon Thames) 51.48708°N 0.28735°W	1903	John Wolfe Barry and Cuthbert Arthur Brereton	Relief	Grade II on 11 February 1988	
	Coat of arms of Middlesex	Floor of entrance hall of Brentford Library	1904	Nowell Parr	Mosaic	Grade II on 2 October 1990	
	Boer War Memorial	In Brentford Library, on staircase	1904	Nowell Parr	Plaque	Grade II on 2 October 1990	
More images	Brentford Monument Battles of Brentford in 54 BC, 1016 and 1642	Brentford High Street, at junction of Alexandra Road and outside Brentford County Court 51.48412°N 0.30401°W	1909 (originally stood in Ferry Lane; moved to current site 1992)		Pillar	—N/a	
More images	Brentford War Memorials	Near junction of Boston Manor Road and Windmill Road, outside Brentford Library 51.48662°N 0.30781°W	1923 (main memorial); the smaller memorials were installed in 1949 and 2009	?	Square column (main memorial)	—N/a	
	Inspiration to Flight	Wallis House, formerly Smithkline Beecham House, Great West Road, originally built as a factory for Simmonds Aerocessaries	1940	Donald Gilbert	Architectural sculpture	Grade II on 25 January 1991	
More images	The Bargemaster	In front of EMC^{2} 51°29′33.67″N 0°17′23.1″W	1990	Diana Thomson	Statue	—N/a	
	Acrobat	GlaxoSmithKline building 51°29′14.43″N 0°19′6.92″W	2001	Allen Jones	Sculpture	—N/a	
More images	Liquidity	Ferry Wharf, at the entrance to the Grand Union Canal from the River Thames 51°28′59.94″N 0°17′58.86″W	2002	Simon Packard	Sculpture	—N/a	
	Big Table	Kew Bridge West	2012	Alison Crowther	Seating sculpture	—N/a	
	Crafted Text Trail	Kew Bridge West	2015	Alec Peever (artist) and Alyson Hallett (poet)	Inscribed slate slabs and York stone boulders	—N/a	
	The Self-Playing Instrument of Water	Kew Bridge West	2015	Harry Pearce of Pentagram (designer); Alice Oswald (poet)	Inscribed Corten steel ribbon	—N/a	
	Totem	Ferry Quays marina		Simon Packard	Sculpture	—N/a	

== Chiswick ==
Image	Title / subject	Location and coordinates	Date	Artist / designer	Type	Designation	Notes
More images	Statue of Andrea Palladio	Chiswick House 51°29′00.8″N 0°15′30.9″W	c. 1730	John Michael Rysbrack	Statue	Grade I on 21 May 1973	
	Statue of Inigo Jones	Chiswick House	c. 1730	John Michael Rysbrack	Statue	Grade I on 21 May 1973	
	Venus (replacement for a previous copy)	Chiswick House grounds 51°29′06.9″N 0°15′33.7″W			Statue	Not listed, but the column on which it stands is	
	Group of statues and ornaments	Chiswick House grounds 51°29′04.2″N 0°15′35.6″W			Sculpture	Grade I on 21 May 1973	
	Royal coat of arms	210 Chiswick High Road, formerly Chiswick Police Station (until 1972); now converted to a restaurant	1872	?	Architectural sculpture	—N/a	
	Ellen Reardon Drinking Fountain Daniel, Elizabeth and Margaret Reardon	Strand-on-the-Green 51.48364°N 0.27718°W	1880	?	Drinking fountain	—N/a	
More images	Bedford Park War Memorial	Bedford Park, near St Michael and All Angels church 51°29′46.22″N 0°15′18.69″W	1919–1920	Inigo Triggs	Seat	Grade II on 7 January 2015	
More images	Chiswick War Memorial	Turnham Green 51.49229°N 0.26332°W	1921	Edward Willis	Obelisk	Grade II on 31 March 2015	
	Couplet	Corner of Church Street and Chiswick Mall 51°29′09″N 0°15′0″W	1999	Charles Hadcock	Sculpture	—N/a	
More images	Statue of William Hogarth and his dog Trump	Chiswick High Road 51.49259°N 0.25518°W	2001	Jim Mathieson	Statue	—N/a	Unveiled by Ian Hislop and David Hockney.
	Mosaics	Belmont Primary School 51°29′35.41″N 0°15′48.25″W	2004	Sue Edkins and schoolchildren	Mosaics	—N/a	
	V2 Attack Victims Memorial	Staveley Road 51°28′55.95″N 0°15′51.31″W	2004	?	Stone of remembrance	—N/a	Unveiled 8 September 2004.
	Large Concretised Monument to the Twentieth Century	Chiswick Business Park 51.4959°N 0.2756°W	2007	Rebecca Warren	Sculpture	—N/a	
	Two-Way Mirror Labyrinth	Chiswick Business Park 51.4947°N 0.2749°W	2007	Jeppe Hein	Sculpture	—N/a	
	Cormorant	Chiswick Business Park 51.4947°N 0.2749°W	2009	Kevin Herlihy	Sculpture	—N/a	Made with recycled rubbish from the Thames
	Chiswick Timeline: A History in Art and Maps	Under railway bridge near Turnham Green tube station	2017–2018	Abundance London (Sarah Cruz, Karen Liebreich and Karen Wyatt) with Peter Blake and Jan Pieńkowski	Mural on vitreous enamel panels	—N/a	Unveiled 28 January 2018.
More images	Enwrought Light William Butler Yeats	Outside St Michael and All Angels, Bedford Park 51.4961°N 0.2551°W	2022	Conrad Shawcross	Sculpture	—N/a	Unveiled 6 September 2022 by Rowan Williams, the sculpture is a short distance from Yeats's childhood home.
	Drinking fountain	At entrance to Chiswick Back Common, Turnham Green Terrace, Chiswick	?	?	Drinking fountain	—N/a	

== Feltham ==
Image	Title / subject	Location and coordinates	Date	Artist / designer	Type	Designation	Notes
	Old Minimax factory gateway	Minimax Corner (junction of Staines Road and Fagg's Road) 51°27′27.6″N 0°24′36.8″W	1911		Architectural fragment	—N/a	
More images	Feltham War Memorial	High Street, near pond 51°26′41.18″N 0°24′38.4″W	c. 1920	?	Cenotaph	Grade II on 19 July 2018	
	Propeller sculpture	London Air Park / Browell's Lane roundabout. Located on the former site of the General Aircraft Ltd factory 51°26′34″N 0°24′15.96″W	1997	William Peers	Sculpture	—N/a	
	Madam Alaska and her lion	Alf King Children's Centre 51°26′53.35″N 0°24′24.99″W	2011	Feltham Arts Association, Susie John and Gemma Hutton	Mural	—N/a	
	Four Seasons	The Centre 51°26′46.27″N 0°24′37.4″W	2014	400 people from Feltham, Bedfont and Hanworth	Mosaics	—N/a	
	Rugby mural	Feltham RFC, Hanworth Park	?	?	Mural	—N/a	
	Graffiti gallery	Feltham Circles, Pevensey Road Nature Reserve 51°26′51.88″N 0°23′24.01″W	?	?	Street art	—N/a	

== Gunnersbury ==
Image	Title / subject	Location and coordinates	Date	Artist / designer	Type	Designation	Notes
More images	Humanitarian Memorial Humanitarian workers killed in conflict	Gunnersbury Park 51.4992°N 0.2878°W	2025	Michael Landy	Sculpture	—N/a	Unveiled 1 October 2025 by the Prince of Wales.

== Hanworth ==
Image	Title / subject	Location and coordinates	Date	Artist / designer	Type	Designation	Notes
More images	Hanworth War Memorial	Junction of Main Street and Green Lane 51°25′47.13″N 0°23′24.73″W	1920	A. P. Green (architect); Keates & Co. (builders)	Celtic cross	Grade II on 7 March 2018	
	Cow sculptures	Roof of Job's Dairy 51°25′47.27″N 0°24′12″W	1977	Volunteers	Architectural sculpture	—N/a	
	Several murals	The Hanworth Centre, 66 Hounslow Road 51°26′11.31″N 0°23′28.46″W	?	?	Murals	—N/a	
	60 ft mural to fallen soldiers	Hanworth Royal British Legion Club garden 51°26′2.62″N 0°23′15.67″W	?	?	Mural	—N/a	

== Heston ==
Image	Title / subject	Location and coordinates	Date	Artist / designer	Type	Designation	Notes
	Brentford drinking fountain	New Western International Market, Hayes Road, Southall 51°29′51.65″N 0°24′24.65″W	1877 at Kew Bridge, moved in 1974	?	Drinking fountain	Grade II on 29 April 2003	
More images	Heston War Memorial	Near St Leonard's Church, Heston Road 51.485395°N 0.373429°W	1918	Arthur George Walker	Statue	Grade II on 19 April 2001	
	The Ramblers	Heston Farm Estate, near the M4 motorway 51°29′21.4″N 0°21′55.19″W	2001	Ray Smith	Sculpture	—N/a	

== Hounslow ==
Image	Title / subject	Location and coordinates	Date	Artist / designer	Type	Designation	Notes
	Angels	Holy Trinity Church, High Street 51°28′6.42″N 0°21′51.72″W	1961–1965	Wilfred Dudeney	Architectural sculpture	—N/a	
	Heart of Space	Lampton Park, relocated from Hounslow Civic Centre 51°28′28.77″N 0°22′5.82″W	1980	Charles Hewlings	Sculpture	—N/a	
	Gate, archway and fence panels	Beaversfield Park / Ravensdale Road / Rosemary Avenue 51°28′12.22″N 0°23′12.21″W	2005–2006	Chris Plowman		—N/a	
	Smile	Side of Platform 3 pub (formerly North Star), Whitton Road 51°27′45.71″N 0°21′46.06″W	2007	Propapropaganda / Banksy	Street art	—N/a	
	Community mosaics	North of High Street, on edge of car park 51°28′9.96″N 0°21′42.72″W	30 March 2012	School and community groups under Susie John and Sue Edkins.	Mosaics	—N/a	
	Hounslow War Memorial	Holy Trinity Church, High Street	2 August 2014			—N/a	
	Dragonfly	Hounslow Heath, near the Staines Road/Frampton Road car park 51°27′44.0″N 0°23′16.8″W				—N/a	
	Memorial to the first flight from Britain to Australia	Staines Road, near Hounslow Heath 51°27′46.9″N 0°23′14.8″W				—N/a	
	Mural	Tivoli Road 51°27′50.4″N 0°23′8.75″W		Paint My Panda		—N/a	

== Isleworth ==
Image	Title / subject	Location and coordinates	Date	Artist / designer	Type	Designation	Notes
	Four cast iron lamp standards	Main entrance to former Gillette Factory, Syon Lane (Gillette Corner) 51°29′2.31″N 0°19′37.96″W	19th century	?	Lamp standards with sculpture	Grade II on 21 May 1973	
	Glossop Memorial Henry Glossop	Upper Square 51°28′7.26″N 0°19′29.43″W	1870	?	Drinking fountain with lamp standard	—N/a	Commemorates the Reverend Henry Glossop (1780–1869), the vicar of All Saints' Church.
More images	Isleworth War Memorial	Twickenham Road, in front of St Bridget's Roman Catholic Church 51°28′09.32″N 0°19′43.04″W	1922	A. P. Green (architect); Keates and Co. (builders)	Clock tower	Grade II on 3 July 2000	Unveiled 22 June 1922.
	Borough Road College War Memorial	Borough Road	After 1918	?	Celtic cross	—N/a	
	Butterflies and birds	Entrance to Redlees Park, Twickenham Road 51°27′53.02″N 0°19′52.04″W	1990s	?	Motifs on railings	—N/a	
	The Ivybridge Mural	Mogden Lane, Ivybridge estate 51°27′37.31″N 0°19′57.04″W	1999	Stephen Stockbridge	Mural	—N/a	
	The Heron	The Cathja Dutch barge, moored at Old Isleworth	?	Martin Cotts	Sculpture	—N/a	
	Rooster and Fox	West Middlesex University Hospital	?	Patrick Moya	Sculpture	—N/a	

== Osterley ==
Image	Title / subject	Location and coordinates	Date	Artist / designer	Type	Designation	Notes
	Eagles with crowns round necks	Entrance to Osterley Park House 51°29′23.02″N 0°21′6.52″W	c. 1761	Robert Adam	Architectural sculpture	Grade I on 21 May 1973	
	Reliefs of mythological creatures	Portico over entrance to Osterley Park House 51°29′22.4″N 0°21′5.82″W	1760s	Robert Adam	Architectural sculpture	Grade I on 21 May 1973	

== Bibliography ==
- Matthews, Peter (2018). London's Statues and Monuments. Oxford: Shire Publications.
