= Christopher Hill (Royal Navy officer) =

Royal Navy officer (died 1778)

Rear-Admiral Christopher Hill
- Born: c.1716
- Died: 11 July 1778
- Military career
- Allegiance: Kingdom of Great Britain
- Branch: Royal Navy
- Service years: 1731–1778
- Rank: Rear-Admiral
- Commands: HMS Princess Royal; HMS Baltimore; HMS Bridgewater; HMS Lyme; HMS Saltash; HMS Dover; HMS St Florentine; HMS Augusta; HMS Barfleur; Nore Command
- Conflicts: Seven Years' War

Rear-Admiral Christopher Hill (c.1716 – 11 July 1778) was a Royal Navy officer who served as Commander-in-Chief, River Medway and the Nore. Having joined the Royal Navy in 1731, Hill served off Ireland, Portugal, and in the Mediterranean Sea before being promoted to commander in 1746. After several commands he was then promoted to post-captain in 1747. While commanding HMS Dover he captured the French East Indiaman Pondichéry during the Seven Years' War. Hill was on half pay between 1760 and 1769, then being given command of HMS Augusta and serving as Commander-in-Chief, River Medway and the Nore for the following year. His last command was HMS Barfleur towards the end of the year. A well-regarded officer, Hill was promoted to rear-admiral in January 1778 but was killed in a fall from his horse six months later.

== Naval career ==
=== Initial service ===
Christopher Hill was born in around 1716. Nothing else is recorded of his personal life or family. He joined the Royal Navy on 17 October 1731, becoming a volunteer-per-order on the 80-gun ship of the line HMS Norfolk which was serving as a guard ship. He moved to the 44-gun frigate HMS Gosport as an able seaman on 3 February the following year, but returned to his position as a volunteer-per-order on Norfolk on 22 October after Gosport was paid off in June. Hill became an able seaman on Norfolk on 17 December the same year, and moved in that position to the 60-gun ship of the line HMS Exeter on 2 July 1733. Exeter had recently been laid up at Plymouth Dockyard. Hill advanced to become a midshipman ordinary twenty-five days later, joining the 60-gun ship of the line HMS Swallow in the Mediterranean Sea.

Hill was promoted to midshipman and sent to join the 8-gun sloop HMS Saltash on 18 March 1734, serving off Ireland. He then transferred back to Norfolk on 16 August, joining Admiral of the Fleet Sir John Norris' fleet in the Tagus. Norfolk was paid off towards the start of 1736. On 5 August Hill joined the 60-gun ship of the line HMS Canterbury. Initially Canterbury was the guard ship at Plymouth, before in 1738 she sailed to the Mediterranean. Just before the ship sailed home, Hill transferred to instead join the 80-gun ship of the line HMS Somerset on 6 February 1740. In Somerset Hill passed his examination for promotion to the rank of lieutenant on 6 March the same year.

Promotion to lieutenant came to Hill only eleven days later when he was appointed third lieutenant of the 54-gun ship of the line HMS Panther, also in the Mediterranean. He was promoted to become Panther's second lieutenant on 27 September the following year, but on 29 October was transferred to join the 20-gun frigate HMS Fox, becoming Fox's sole lieutenant. Serving off the Canary Islands, Fox captured the Spanish privateer Nuestra Señora del Humildade on 2 February 1743, and two days later Hill was appointed first lieutenant of the newly commissioned 44-gun frigate HMS Torrington. In Torrington Hill served as part of a convoy escort to Lisbon and then off Dunkirk, before in June 1744 going to the Leeward Islands. He left the ship on 10 January 1745, and was promoted to commander just over a year later on 29 January 1746.

=== Command ===
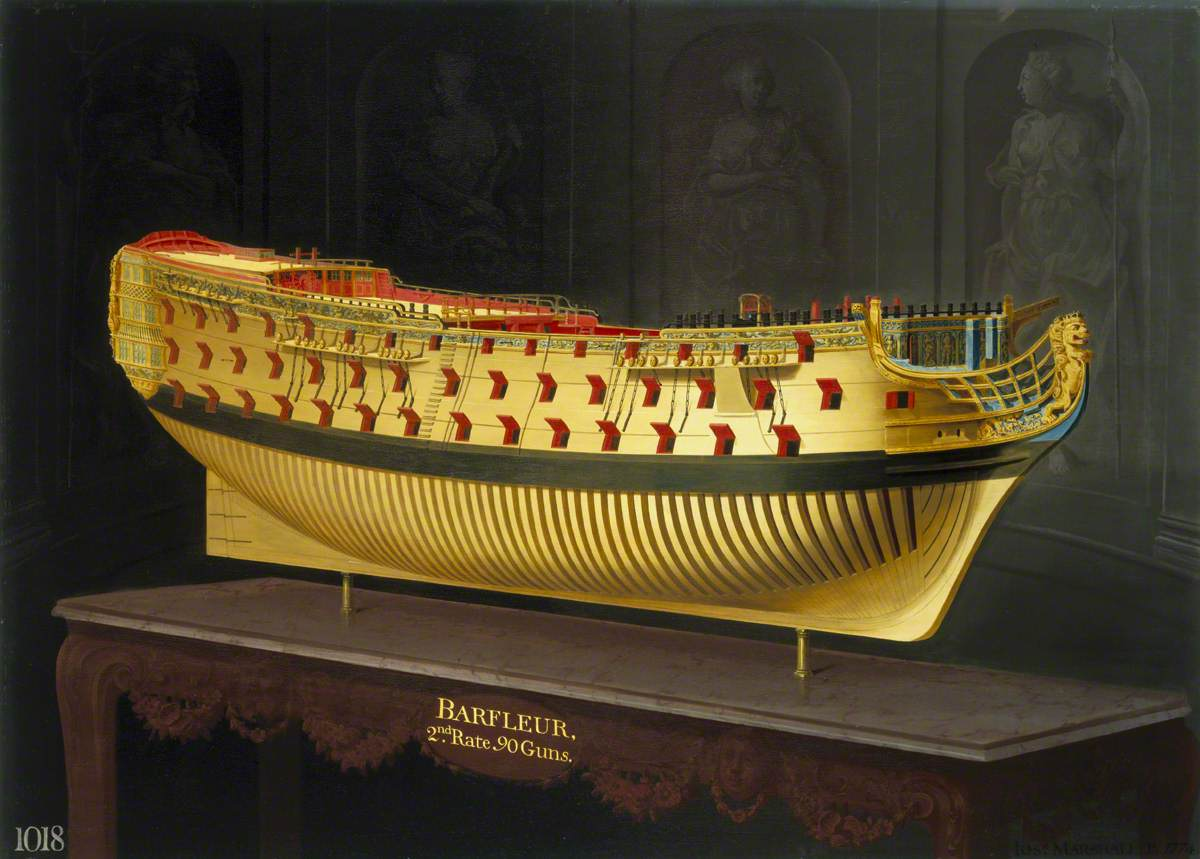
HMS Barfleur, Hill's last command

Hill was given command of the 24-gun storeship HMS Princess Royal at the time of his promotion, and commanded her in the Mediterranean until 18 May 1747. Two months later he was appointed to command the 14-gun sloop HMS Baltimore, undergoing a refit, which he continued in until being promoted to captain on 5 December. Hill was then sent to join the 24-gun frigate HMS Bridgewater, serving in Vice-Admiral Sir Peter Warren's fleet. The ship was paid off on 10 February 1749. For some period in 1751 he then took command of the 20-gun frigate HMS Lyme. He did not receive another command until 23 April 1753 when he was given the 14-gun sloop HMS Saltash, for the Irish Sea. He stayed in the ship for two years before joining the 44-gun frigate HMS Dover on 28 October 1755.

With the Seven Years' War ongoing, in Dover Hill captured the French East Indiaman Pondichéry on 23 December 1756 after an engagement of two hours. The French vessel lost her second captain and eleven men killed, with eighteen wounded, while the British sustained no casualties. Pondichéry had been sailing from Canton when Dover intercepted her, bringing her initially into Cork before taking the prize to the Nore. Hill left Dover on 23 April the following year, and was appointed to the 60-gun ship of the line HMS St Florentine on 11 September 1759. Serving in Admiral Edward Boscawen's fleet and then in 1760 Admiral Sir Edward Hawke's, Hill continued in St Florentine until 15 December, and then went on an extended period of half pay.

This period of unemployment ended on 26 October 1769 when Hill was given command of the 64-gun ship of the line HMS Augusta, the guard ship at Sheerness. On 9 January the following year Hill was appointed a commodore to serve as Commander-in-Chief, River Medway and The Nore. Initially serving as such in Augusta, on 23 October he moved into the 90-gun ship of the line HMS Barfleur. He continued at the Nore until around 7 December when he relinquished his position and command of Barfleur. Despite having seen little action in his naval career Hill was a well-regarded officer, primarily because of his good personal conduct. He was promoted to rear-admiral on 23 January 1778. Initially a rear-admiral of the blue, he was advanced to rear-admiral of the white on 29 January. Hill died six months later on 4 July when he fell from his horse while riding from London to Croydon.

== Sources ==
- Charnock, John (2011) [1798]. Biographia Navalis. Vol. 6. Cambridge: Cambridge University Press. ISBN 978-1-108-02636-9.
- Harrison, Cy (2019). Royal Navy Officers of the Seven Years War. Warwick, England: Helion. ISBN 978-1-912866-68-7.
- Kimber, Isaac; Kimber, Edward (1770). The London Magazine, Or, Gentleman's Monthly Intelligencer. Vol. 39.
- Martin, Benjamin (1759). Miscellaneous Correspondence, Containing a Variety of Subjects, Relative to Natural and Civil History, Geography, Mathematics, Poetry, Memoirs of Monthly Occurrences, Catalogues of New Books, &c. Vol. 2. W. Owen.
- Schomberg, Isaac (1802). Naval Chronology, Or an Historical Summary of Naval and Maritime Events from the Time of the Romans, to the Treaty of Peace 1802: With an Appendix. Vol. 5. London.
- Syrett, David; DiNardo, R. L. (1994). The Commissioned Sea Officers of the Royal Navy 1660–1815. Aldershot: Scolar Press. ISBN 1-85928-122-2.
- Welsh, Andrew (1757). The Magazine of Magazines: Compiled from Original Pieces, with Extracts from the Most Celebrated Books, and Periodical Compositions, Published in Europe... The Whole Forming a Complete Literary and Historical Account of that Period. Vol. 13.
- Winfield, Rif (2007). British Warships in the Age of Sail 1714-1792: Design, Construction, Careers and Fates. Seaforth Publishing. ISBN 978-1-78346-925-3.

Military offices
Preceded by William Gordon	Commander-in-Chief, The Nore; 1770	Succeeded by Sir Peter Denis
