= Captain Lord George Graham in his Cabin =

1745 painting by William Hogarth

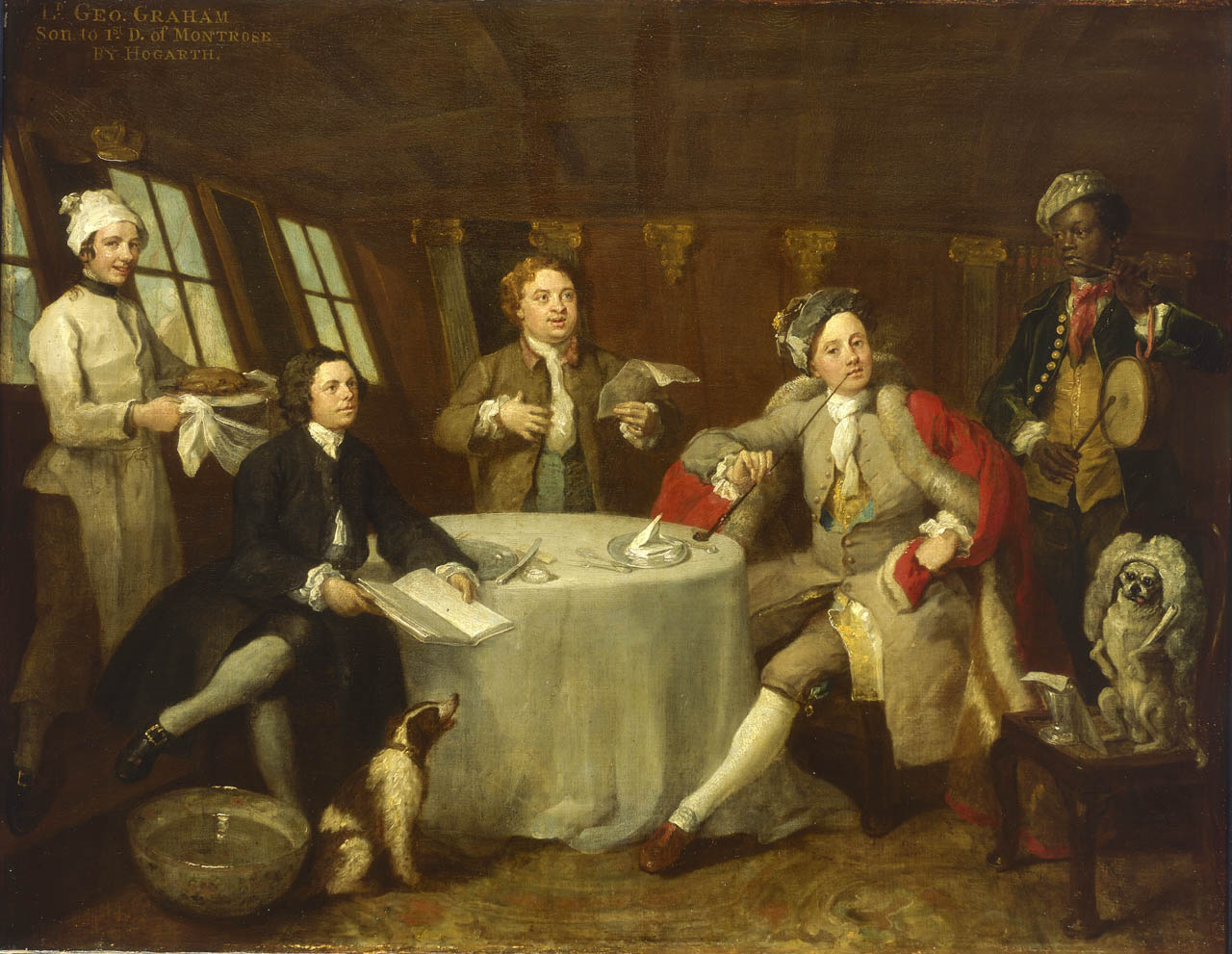
- Artist: William Hogarth
- Year: 1745
- Medium: Oil on canvas
- Dimensions: 69 cm × 89 cm (27 in × 35 in)
- Location: National Maritime Museum; London

Captain Lord George Graham in his Cabin is a 1745 oil-on-canvas painting by the English artist William Hogarth. A conversational picture, it shows Captain Lord George Graham, of the Royal Navy, in the cabin of his ship with several people.

The painting was probably commissioned by Graham to commemorate a naval battle he had fought recently. While commanding a 24-gun sixth rate, he had been one of three British ships to attack a squadron of three powerful French privateers and their prizes. The British were successful in their engagement, capturing all of the prizes, and all but one of the privateers. Lauded for his achievements, Graham was given another, larger, ship to command. The painting is probably set aboard this new command, the 60-gun HMS Nottingham, and shows Graham relaxing in the great cabin before a meal, smoking a pipe. With him are the ship's chaplain and clerk, who sing and listen to music played by a black servant. A steward brings a roast duck to the table. Two dogs are also present in the scene, one joins in the singing, the other wears a wig and reads a sheet of music.

The scene contains elements of satire and symbolism, in common with Hogarth's other works. The relaxed scene contrasts the tension of the naval battle it commemorates, with elements of humour including the officious pose and behaviour of one of the dogs, who apes Graham's official position. The steward looks out of the painting at the viewer with a smile, while obliviously tipping gravy down the chaplain's back. The positioning and depiction of Graham and the black servant invite comparisons, with Hogarth's presentation of black subjects in paintings being studied by later academics. Hogarth drew from his own experience in group portraits, and was probably influenced by an earlier cabin work by Bartolomeo Nazari. Graham's enjoyment of the painting was short-lived, he died in 1747. His family kept the portrait in their collections until 1932, when it was sold to Sir James Caird, who subsequently donated it to the National Maritime Museum, where it remains.

== Background ==
Lord George Graham was a younger son of James Graham, 1st Duke of Montrose, and had entered the Royal Navy at a young age. He served with some distinction during the wars of the early eighteenth century, and also entered politics, sitting as member of parliament through his father's interest. He was appointed to command the 24-gun HMS Bridgewater in 1745 and cruised in the English Channel. While cruising in the Channel off Ostend on 2 July, in company with the 24-gun HMS Sheerness under Captain William Gordon, and the armed vessel Ursula under Lieutenant Fergusson, Graham came across three large privateers from Dunkirk, sailing in company with their captured prize vessels. The French privateers were the 28-gun Royal, 26-gun Duchesse de Penthierre, and a 12-gun dogger. They had captured seven prizes, and were taking them into Dunkirk. The British force attacked them early in the morning of 3 July. After a fierce fight lasting until 4.am, four of the prizes surrendered to the Sheerness, the Royal and Duchesse de Penthierre struck their colours to the Bridgewater, and the Ursula captured the remaining three prizes. The dogger managed to escape.

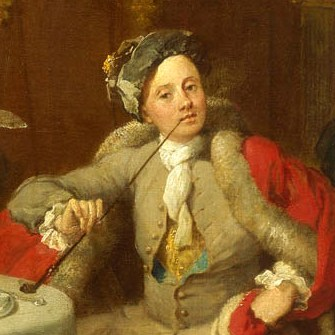
The subject of the portrait, Captain Lord George Graham, leans against the table, holding a pipe

For his success in the engagement, Graham was commended to the First Lord of the Admiralty, John Russell, 4th Duke of Bedford, and was given command of a larger ship, the 60-gun HMS Nottingham. He probably commissioned a portrait from Hogarth at about this time, and the resulting painting is believed to be set aboard Graham's new command, which in late 1745 was on the Downs station.

== Positioning ==
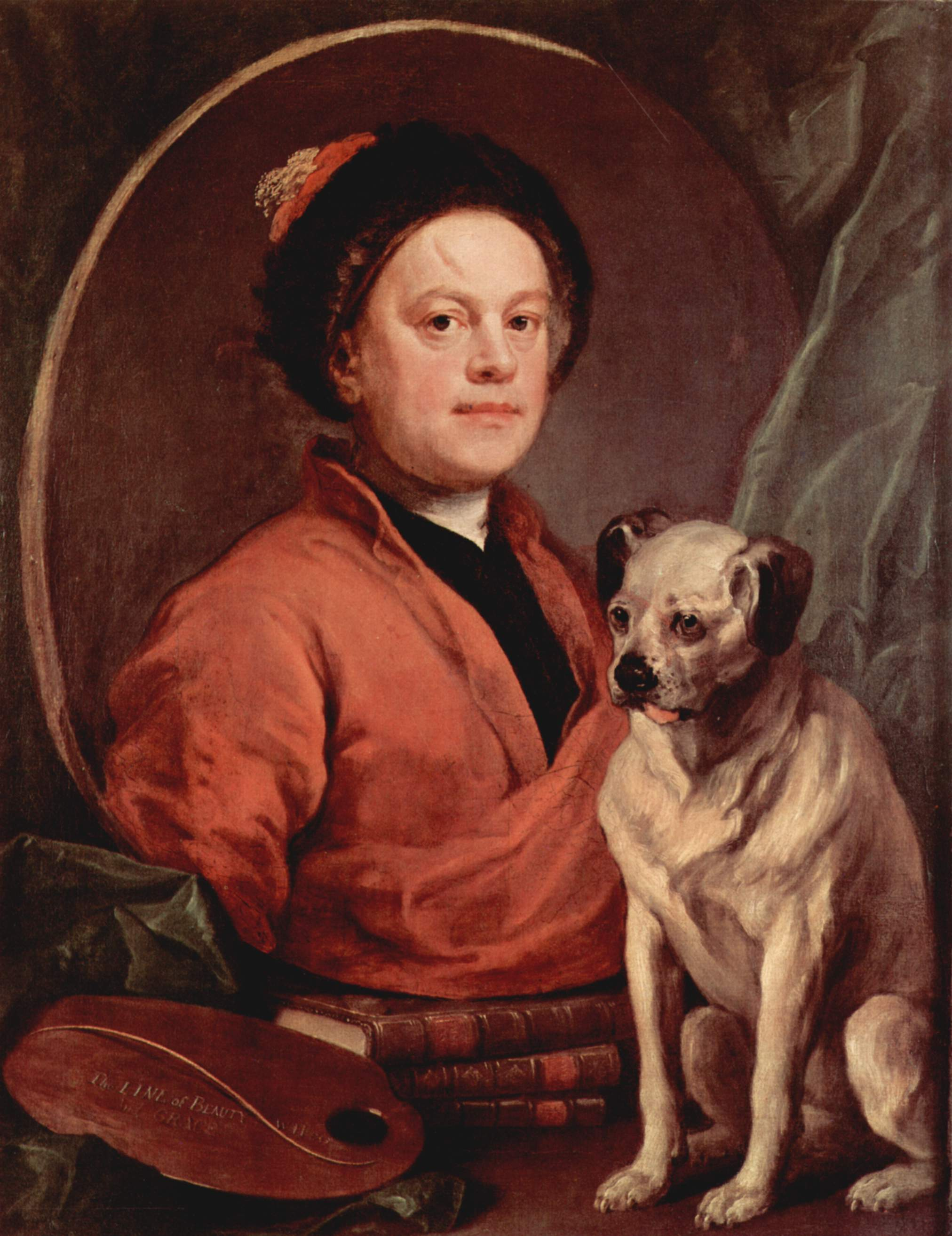
A 1745 self-portrait by Hogarth, including his pug dog Trump, who represents his master in the portrait

Graham is seated to the right of the picture, on the left of the table that divides the picture. He is seen in full length, facing forwards though looking to the side, while smoking a long pipe. Standing to Graham's right, his lower half obscured by the table cloth, a man holds a sheet of music and is in the act of singing. The third member of the dining party is seated on the left of the painting, and like Graham is visible in full length. Ronald Paulson identifies them as the ship's clerk and chaplain. The music the men are listening or singing along to is provided by a black manservant, standing on the right of the painting and playing a pipe and tabor. A steward stands opposite him on the left of the painting, framing the composition. The steward holds a plate of roast duck, but looks out of the painting towards the viewer with a smile, while gravy drips from the plate down the back of the chaplain's coat. The remaining members of the portrait are two dogs. One is Graham's own, sitting at the chaplain's feet and apparently joining in the singing. The other, sat on his haunches on a chair on the right of the painting, is Hogarth's own pug, Trump. Trump, his tongue lolling out and wearing Graham's wig, holds a scroll and appears to read from his own sheet of music, balanced against a wine glass in front of him.

== Clothing ==
The men are well dressed, Graham smokes a pipe while wearing a fur-lined red velvet cape and a green velvet cap which is slightly askew. The grey coat he wears with a white neckerchief is opened at the chest, revealing a gold-brocade waistcoat, his lower half is clothed in breeches, stockings and slippers. The chaplain wears a black coat with a white collar, grey stockings and black shoes with gold buckles, the costume of a social inferior to Graham, but indicating his educated status. The clerk's dress is similarly simple, a brown jacket, bluish-green waistcoat and white collar, while the steward wears a white apron, smock and cap with a black collar, and brown trousers. The black servant's dress is richer, a white cap and pink neckerchief, and a green buttoned velvet coat with a yellow waistcoat. Trump wears Graham's wig. The colours of the painting are mostly of cool greys, blues and reds, with the brown of some of the clothes and the wooden pilaster panelling, and the lighter blue through the window on the left of the painting.

== Imagery and symbolism ==
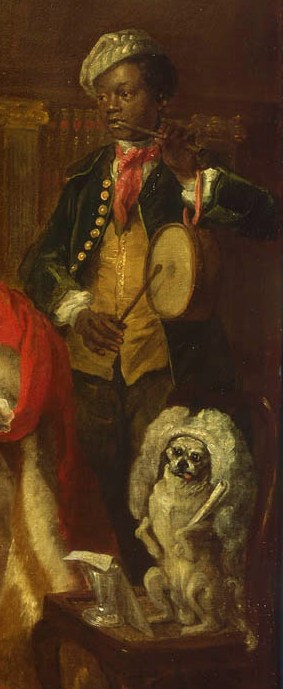
The black servant on the right of the painting plays a pipe and tabor. Below, Hogarth's pug dog Trump balances on a chair while wearing Graham's wig.

Hogarth included numerous elements in the painting. The scene is probably the great cabin of Graham's latest command, and the sails of ships are visible through the line of windows on the left of the painting. The furniture and objects are luxurious and the room is richly panelled and decorated. The chaplain holds a ledger and at his feet is a large famille-rose punch bowl, the punch bowl being an invitation to the viewer to join the levity at the table. He is separated from Graham across the table by a salt-cellar, possibly symbolising their social difference. His presence at the captain's table for this informal occasion nevertheless indicates that he is a privileged member of Graham's entourage.

The clerk, standing in the centre of the portrait and uniting the two-halves, holds the music he is singing from, possibly entitled 'Farewell my Judy'. Jeremy Barlow speculates that this might be a sentimental love song. The two servants frame the picture, the black servant playing a pipe and tabor. The combination of these musical instruments had a popular accompaniment to dancing for several centuries, but was in decline in England by the eighteenth century. Barlow considers Hogarth's representation of the tabor pipe a poor one, arguing that it is too short and has too many holes to be the usual three-holed tabor pipe, the boy holds it too far up its length and does not cover all the holes. Barlow points out that Hogarth may have intended the instrument to be a flabiol instead. He also notes that the lively music the instruments would have produced would be unlikely to complement a sentimental ballad that the clerk appears to be singing, and instead suggests the painting combines and conflates a number of typical activities in the cabin into one scene.

The dogs join the people, their inclusion with the servants in the portrait invites commentary on Graham's circle. Trump's officious pose and lolling tongue, while wearing Graham's wig and brandishing the scroll of paper, makes light of the formality of Graham's position. Trump represents Hogarth in the painting, while his pose with the scroll, as used by musical conductors of the time, suggest that he may be the humorous conductor for the music and singing taking place. The steward stands at the left of the painting under a hanging crown compass, and carelessly drips gravy down the chaplain's neck, adding a final element of farce to the setting. In the relaxed and informal setting of the cabin, adding touches of humour and foolishness, Hogarth provides a contrast with the dangers of the pitched battle that the painting commemorates.

The black servant in the painting reveals Hogarth's careful study of black and white forms. His positioning, clothes and stance echoes Graham's with his pipe, but they face different directions so as to present different profiles. The red of Graham's cape connects with the colour of the servant's neckcloth, while their similar caps, coats and waistcoats heighten the sense of connection, with the servant given equally colourful and variegated clothing. The facial features and textures are similar, showing off their youthfulness, while Graham's fair skin and the servant's dark skin complement and contrast each other. Hogarth has also varied the appearance of the dark skin to show that the colour is not uniform, but changes in the light. Art historian David Bindman argued that Hogarth's representation of the servant avoided the traditional stereotypes of black people in art.

== Influences ==
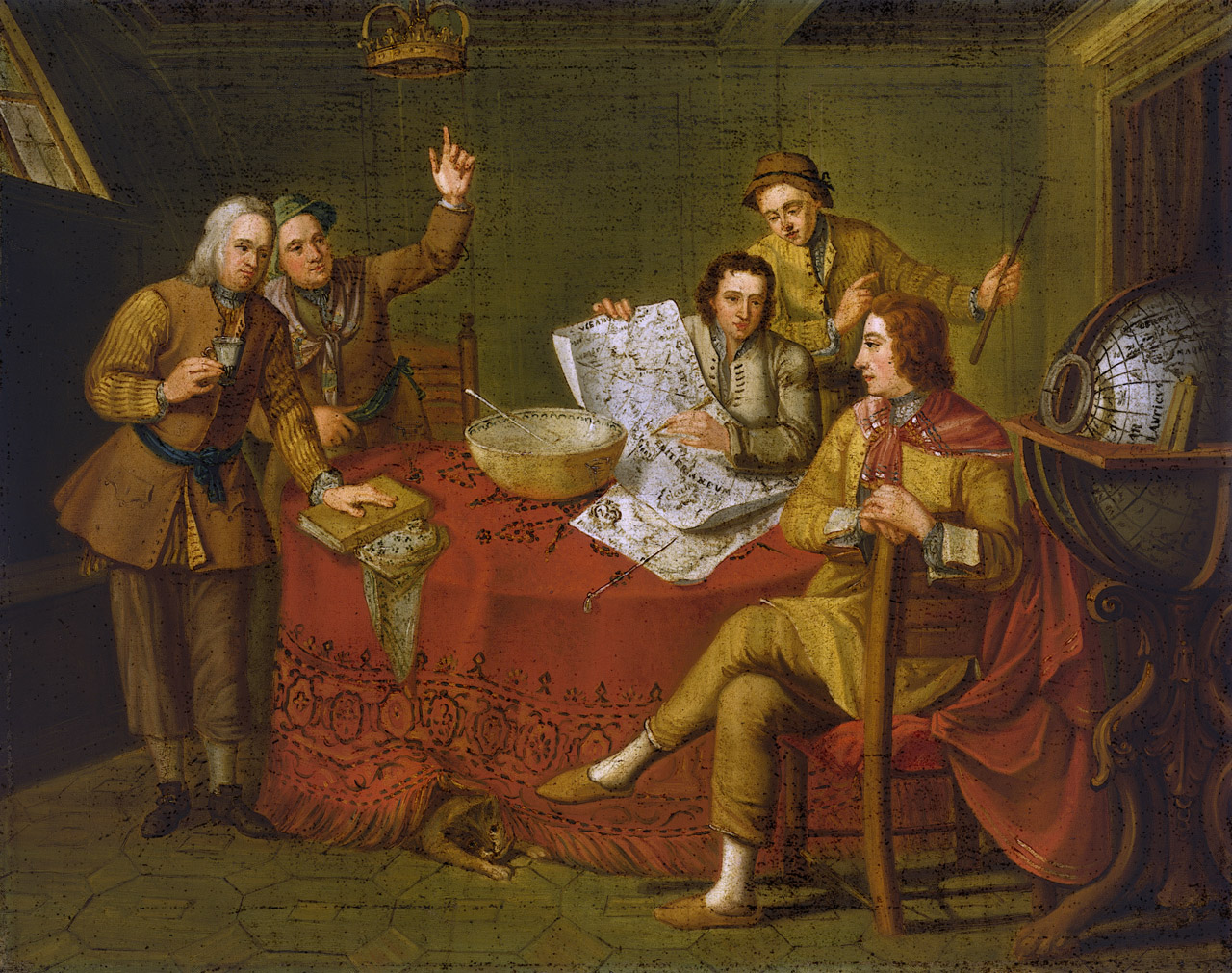
Gustavus Hamilton, 2nd Viscount Boyne, and Friends in a Ship's Cabin, 1731–2, by Bartolomeo Nazari. Lord Boyne is depicted on board a ship while making a Grand Tour, accompanied by Sir Francis Dashwood, Charles Howard, 3rd Earl of Carlisle and Lord Middlesex. The piece probably influenced Hogarth's work.

It is unknown whether the idea for the setting came from Graham or Hogarth, though Hogarth had already produced a similarly composed conversational piece for John Hervey, 2nd Baron Hervey, entitled Lord Hervey and His Friends. Hogarth reworked the concept for a naval setting, though he probably also drew inspiration from a 1732 painting by Bartolomeo Nazari. Nazari produced a similar cabin scene showing Lord Boyne and his companions during a voyage to Lisbon from Venice. A number of elements, such as the hanging compass, punch bowl, and the presence of animals, were included in Hogarth's work. Nazari's work had been popular, resulting in a large number of copies, and Hogarth knew Boyne, having painted his portrait.

== Ownership ==
Graham did not enjoy his portrait for long, dying on 2 January 1747. The painting remained in the collections of the Dukes of Montrose and was exhibited on a number of occasions; at Glasgow in 1888, the Royal Naval College in 1891 and at the Royal Academy in 1934. It was purchased by Sir James Caird in 1932, and was a particular favourite of his. It was later presented to the National Maritime Museum, where it remains today. Cabin scenes are rare in oil painting, and the museum considers this to be the most famous example in British art.

== See also ==
- List of works by William Hogarth
