= Lord George Graham =

British officer of the Royal Navy and politician (1715–1747)

Captain Lord George Graham
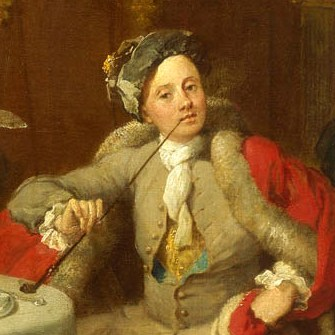
- Captain Lord George Graham in his Cabin
- Born: 26 September 1715; Scotland
- Died: 2 January 1747 (aged 31); Bath, Somerset, Great Britain
- Relatives: James Graham, 1st Duke of Montrose (father)
- Military career
- Allegiance: Great Britain
- Branch: Royal Navy
- Service years: 1730–1747
- Rank: Captain
- Commands: HMS Mercury; HMS Lark; HMS Bridgewater; HMS Nottingham
- Conflicts: War of the Austrian Succession; Jacobite Rising of 1745

Captain Lord George Graham (26 September 1715 – 2 January 1747) was a Scottish officer of the Royal Navy who saw service during the War of the Austrian Succession. He embarked on a political career, and was a Member of Parliament.

Graham was born into the nobility, the younger son of a duke, and embarked on a naval career early in his life. Rising through the ranks, he was given his first commands early in the War of the Austrian Succession, and served in the Mediterranean and in escorting convoys. He entered parliament through the influence of his father, and represented the Scottish constituency of Stirlingshire from 1741 until his death. He was a Whig and a political supporter of the Duke of Argyll.

Turning down the command of a ship of the line in favour of a frigate, Graham won renown for a victory over several powerful privateers and their prizes. Rewarded with a larger ship, he also commissioned a painting from William Hogarth to commemorate the event, Captain Lord George Graham in his Cabin. He continued in the navy, intercepting privateers and enemy ships, but was struck down with a severe illness, and despite moving ashore, died in 1747.

== Family and early life ==
Lord George Graham was born on 26 September 1715, the son of James Graham, 1st Duke of Montrose, and his wife Christian, the daughter of David Carnegie, 3rd Earl of Northesk.^{[a]} He entered the navy at an early age and served at first as a midshipman from 1730, and was promoted to lieutenant in 1734. He was given a command in 1739, when he was appointed to the fireship HMS Mercury and sent out to the Mediterranean to join Sir Nicholas Haddock's fleet. He held the command until 15 March 1740, when he was promoted to captain.^{[b]} He was appointed to command the 40-gun HMS Lark in 1741 with orders to escort a convoy of merchants bound for Turkey. He does not appear to have held the command long, for by late 1741 Lark was under the command of Captain Rupert Waring, escorting a convoy to the West Indies.

Graham combined his naval career with a political one, and using the influence of his father, was returned for Stirlingshire as an opposition Whig in 1741. He was one of a number of Scottish MPs who gathered together under John Campbell, 2nd Duke of Argyll to oppose the administration, and were known as the Duke of Argyll's gang. As part of this faction Graham voted against the administration in 1742 and 1744. He also spoke out against the decision to court-martial Admiral Thomas Mathews in the spring of 1745, defending him in a vigorous debate over his actions at the inconclusive Battle of Toulon.

== Command ==
Graham was appointed to command the 60-gun HMS Cumberland in 1745, but turned it down, preferring an active cruising frigate to a ship of the line. He was instead offered the 24-gun HMS Bridgewater and cruised in the English Channel. While cruising in the Channel off Ostend on 2 July, in company with the 24-gun HMS Sheerness under Captain William Gordon, and the armed vessel Ursula under Lieutenant Fergusson, he came across three large privateers from Dunkirk, sailing in company with their prizes. The French privateers were the 28-gun Royal, 26-gun Duchesse de Penthierre, and a 12-gun dogger. They had taken seven prizes, and were taking them into Dunkirk. The British force attacked them early in the morning of 3 July. After a fierce fight lasting until 4.am, four of the prizes surrendered to the Sheerness, the Royal and Duchesse de Penthierre struck their colours to the Bridgewater, and the Ursula captured the remaining three prizes. The dogger managed to escape.

For his success in the engagement, Graham was commended to the First Lord of the Admiralty, John Russell, 4th Duke of Bedford, and was given command of a larger ship, the 60-gun HMS Nottingham.

=== Hogarth's portrait ===
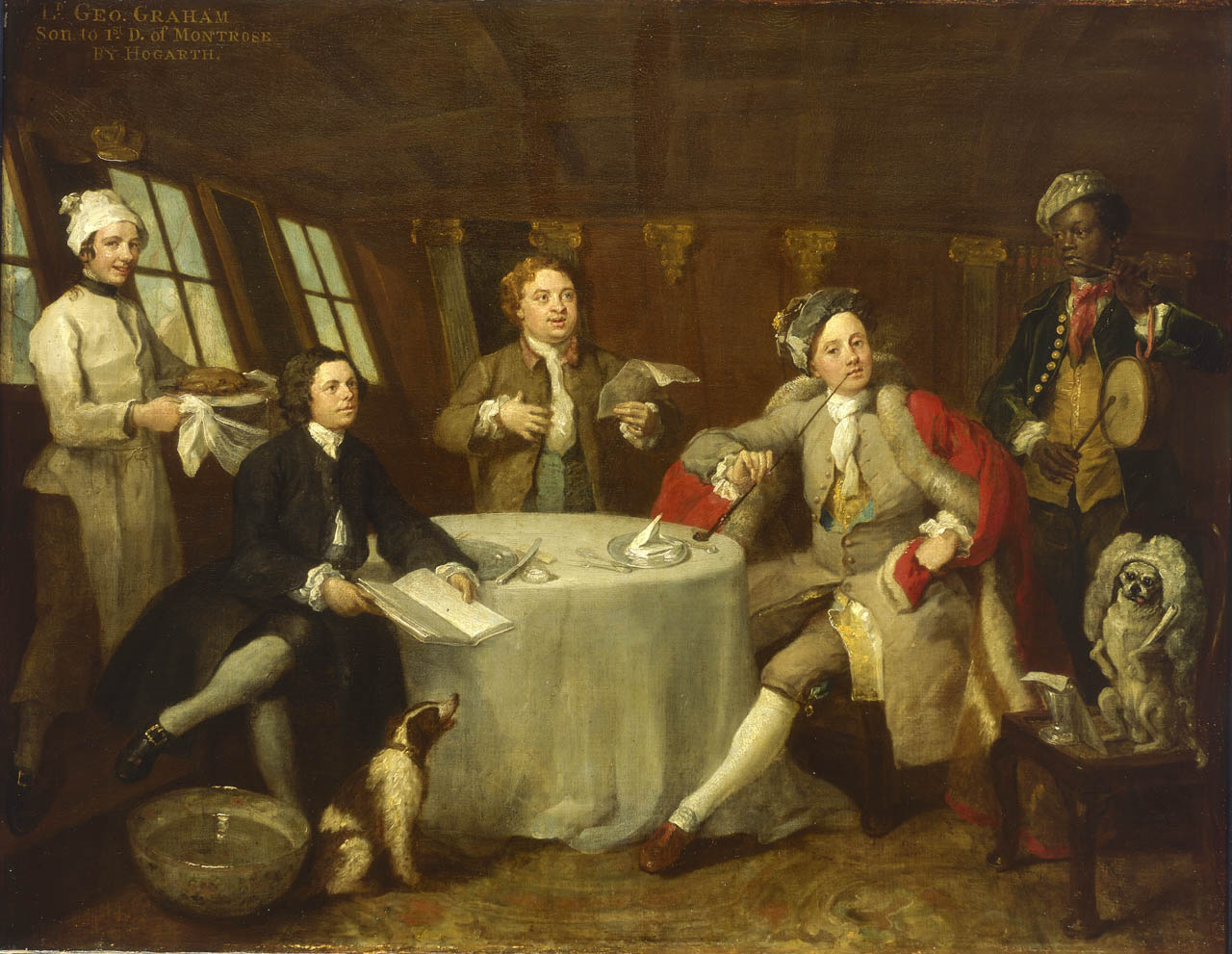
Captain Lord George Graham, 1715–47, in his Cabin

Shortly after the engagement Graham commissioned William Hogarth to paint as a conversation picture a cabin portrait to celebrate his victory, probably using the cabin of the Nottingham as a setting. Hogarth painted Graham smoking his pipe in his cabin before dinner, while listening to pipe and tabor music played by his black servant, while his chaplain and clerk sing. Two dogs are visible, one is Graham's own, which joins in the singing. The other is Trump, Hogarth's dog, which is shown wearing Graham's wig, holding a scroll, and reading from a sheet of music propped against a wine glass. A steward, holding a plate of fowl, looks out of the painting at the viewer with a smile, and drops gravy down the back of the chaplain's neck. The painting has several political and social allusions in Hogarth's satirical style. Cabin scenes in oil are rare, and Hogarth's is considered by the current owner, the National Maritime Museum, to be the most famous in British art.

=== Last deployments ===
The Nottingham was attached to the fleet in the Downs under Admiral Edward Vernon that winter, and cruised with a squadron in the Bay of Biscay the following year. Some of Graham's later actions included the capture of the privateer Hermine on 29 September 1746, and the sinking of the privateer Bacchus. He was deployed off the north of Scotland in April 1746 to intercept any French vessels that might attempt to rescue survivors of the failed Jacobite rising, and so missed the political debates in parliament that month, though he was classed as a "new ally".

== Death and legacy ==
Graham appears to have been taken ill during his time at sea, and he went ashore at Bristol. His brother, William Graham, 2nd Duke of Montrose came to meet him there in October, but Lord George Graham's health declined further, and he died at Bath on 2 January 1747. John Charnock concluded his biography of Graham with the observation that "from a multitude of concurrent testimonies he appears to have been an officer that attained a great share of popularity, and was indeed, very deservedly, the idol of all seamen who knew him, as well on the account of the high opinion entertained of his gallantry, of an invincible fund of good humour, which latter quality conciliated the affections of men in the same degree that the first related excited their admiration and esteem." His group portrait by Hogarth survived him, and is now held in the collections of the National Maritime Museum.

== Notes ==
a. It has been difficult to determine which son he was. The Dictionary of National Biography and John Charnock's Biographia Navalis state he was the fourth son, while Sedgwick's The History of Parliament instead has him as the seventh. A number of other sons appear to have died in infancy, and Lord George was one of the few to reach adulthood.

b. Some sources, such as Charnock's Biographia Navalis and John Knox Laughton in the Dictionary of National Biography have the promotion accompanied by an appointment to command the 40-gun HMS Adventure on the Newfoundland station as Commodore-Governor. Winfield's British Warships in the Age of Sail considers the appointment to Adventure "unlikely", noting that by 1740 Adventure was a hulk. The website of Government House, Newfoundland and Labrador, dismisses the claim that Graham was governor, noting that there is "no evidence to support this appointment", and that the governor in 1740 was Henry Medley.

== Citations ==
Parliament of Great Britain
Preceded by Sir James Campbell	Member of Parliament for Stirlingshire; 1741–1747	Succeeded by Lord Erskine
