= Jim Mathieson =

Jim Mathieson may refer to:

- Jim Mathieson (ice hockey) (born 1970), Canadian ice hockey player
- Jim Mathieson (footballer) (1892–1982), Australian rules footballer
- Jim Mathieson (sculptor) (1931–2003), British sculptor

== See also ==
- James Mathieson (1905–1950), Scottish football goalkeeper
- Jamie Mathieson (born 1970), British television screenwriter
