= Admiral Gordon =

Admiral Gordon may refer to:

- Charles Gordon (Royal Navy officer) (1781–1860), British Royal Navy admiral
- James Gordon (Royal Navy officer) (1782–1869), British Royal Navy admiral
- John E. Gordon (born 1941), U.S. Navy rear admiral
- Thomas Gordon (Royal Scots Navy officer) (c. 1658–1741), Scottish-bron Imperial Russian Navy admiral
- William Gordon (Royal Navy officer, born 1705) (1705–1769), British Royal Navy rear admiral
- William Gordon (Royal Navy officer, born 1784) (1784–1858), British Royal Navy vice admiral

== See also ==
- Alexander Gordon-Lennox (Royal Navy officer) (1911–1987), British Royal Navy rear admiral
- Lord Frederick Gordon-Hallyburton (1799–1878), British Royal Navy admiral
