= Painter and his Pug =

1745 self-portrait by William Hogarth

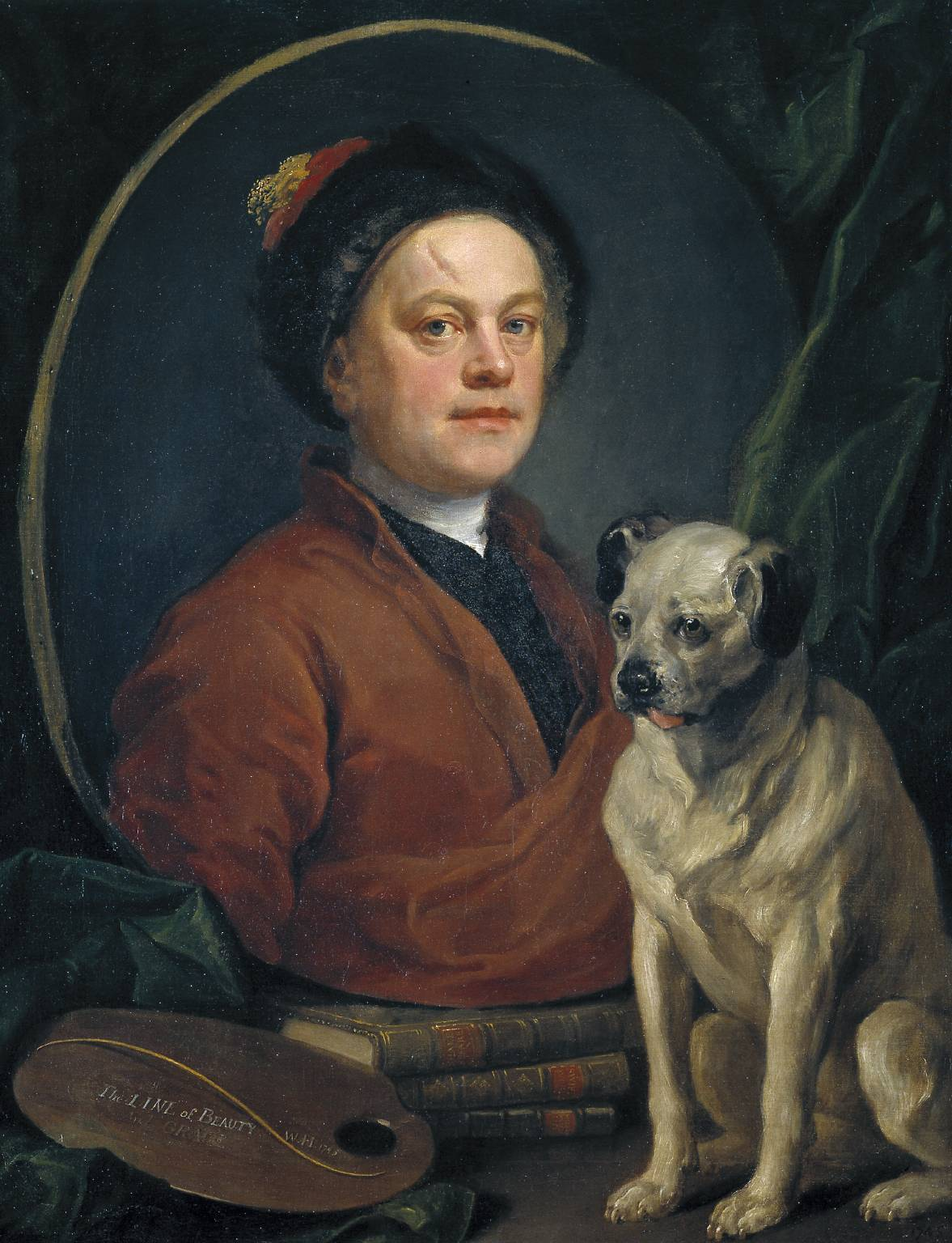

The Painter and his Pug is a 1745 self-portrait created by William Hogarth featuring his pug dog, Trump. He began the portrait a decade earlier. The portrait was originally created with the intention of Hogarth wearing formal attire, but was changed to the informal attire sometime during the painting process.

In the portrait, Hogarth himself is in a painting as the pug is alongside him, making Trump "real" as opposed to the created person. The dog is indifferent to the painting, to the books and to the painting palette (which shows Hogarth's Line of Beauty). So the painting seems to be a Vanitas still life. But, as an ironic disruption, the cloth behind the dog comes out of the painting.

The painting is part of the collections of Tate Britain.

== See also ==
- List of works by William Hogarth
