= Enwrought Light =

Sculpture by Conrad Shawcross

Coordinates: 51.4961°N 0.2551°W

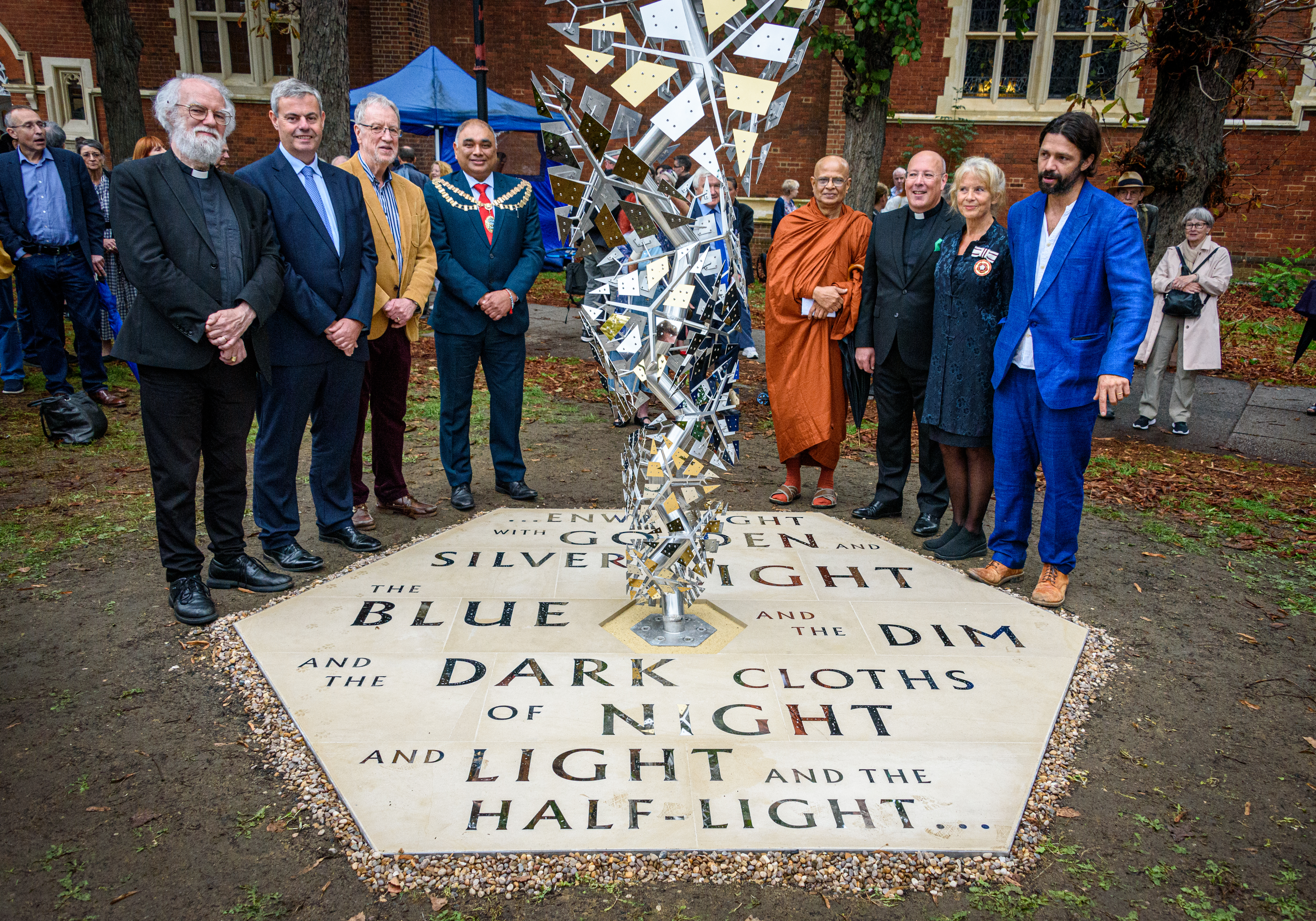
- Artist: Conrad Shawcross
- Medium: Sculpture
- Subject: W. B. Yeats
- Location: Bedford Park, London, United Kingdom

Enwrought Light is a sculpture in Bedford Park, London. It was sculpted by Conrad Shawcross and commemorates the poet W. B. Yeats who was a resident of the area for many years. It was unveiled on 6 September 2022 by Rowan Williams, the former Archbishop of Canterbury. The sculpture stands on Bath Rd and The Avenue, outside St Michael & All Angels Church at the corner of The Avenue and Bath Road.
