= Trump (dog) =

Pug owned by the English artist William Hogarth

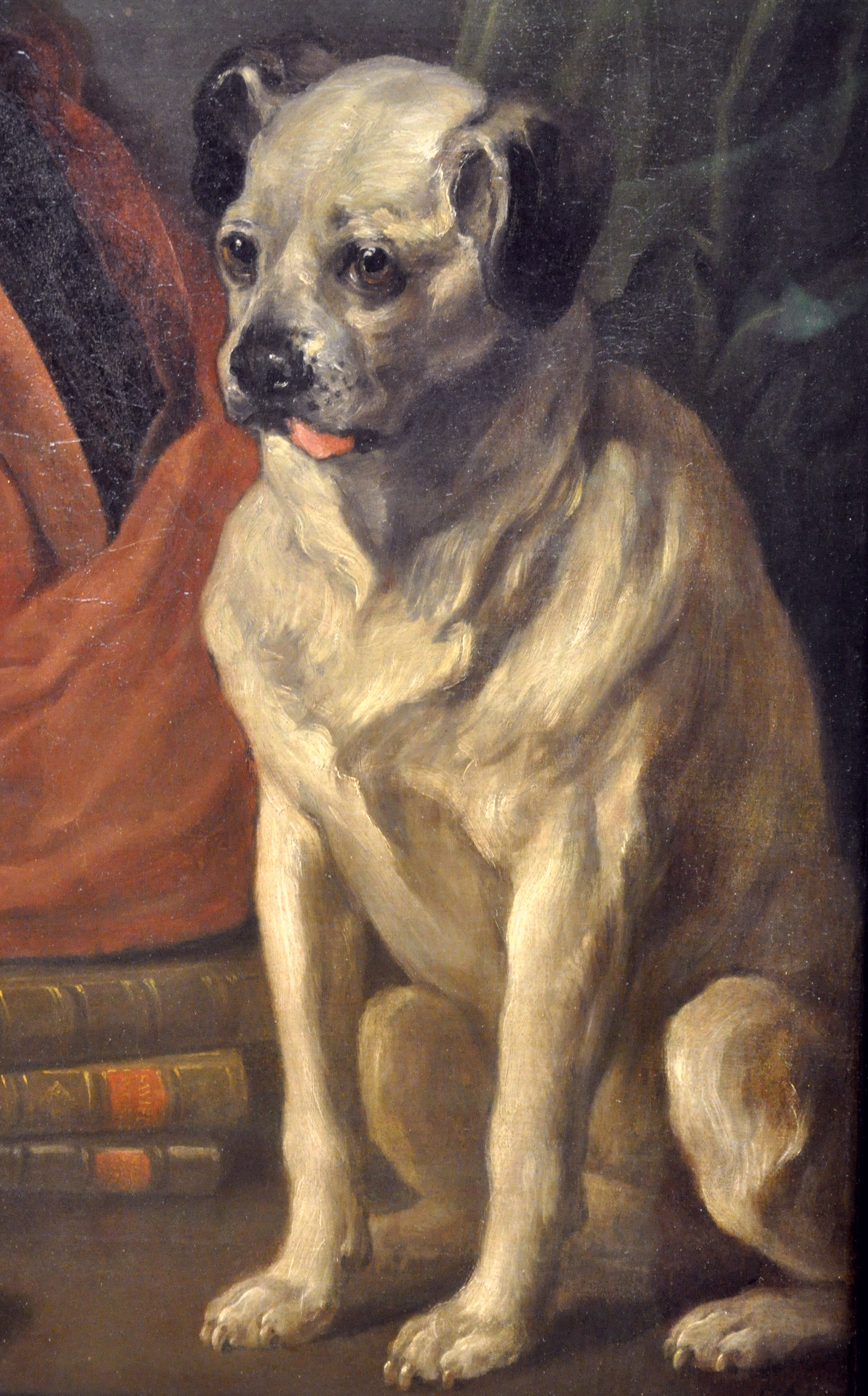
Trump, in a detail from William Hogarth's Painter and his Pug, 1745

Trump (c. 1730 – c. 1745) was a pug owned by English painter William Hogarth. He included the dog in several works, including his 1745 self-portrait Painter and his Pug, held by the Tate Gallery. In the words of the Tate's display caption, "Hogarth's pug dog, Trump, serves as an emblem of the artist's own pugnacious character."

== History ==
Hogarth owned several different pugs through his life. For example, in December 1730, he placed an advertisement offering a half guinea reward for the return of a dog named "Pugg".

Pugs appear in several of Hogarth's paintings. An early example is his 1730 group portrait of The Wollaston Family, on loan to the New Walk Museum in Leicester since 1943. In the fifth scene of Hogarth's 1732–1734 series A Rake's Progress, a scene known as Married To An Old Maid which is held by Sir John Soane's Museum, a pug appears to be marrying a one-eyed dog, mirroring the wedding scene depicted behind in which the spendthrift Tom Rakewell is marrying a rich old maid.

Trump is believed to be the puppy in the Hogarth's 1730 group portrait The Fountaine Family, held by the Philadelphia Museum of Art, whose sitters include Andrew Fountaine. The adult pug in the 1738 The Strode Family, held by the Tate Gallery, may also be Trump, although some sources indicate that this pug belongs to one of the subjects, Colonel Strode.

Louis-François Roubiliac sculpted Trump in terracotta, c. 1741, to accompany a terracotta bust of Hogarth. The reclining terracotta figure of Trump was reproduced in Chelsea porcelain in the late 1740s. Plaster casts were sold with Hogarth's possessions after his death in 1762. The Staffordshire potter Josiah Wedgwood made a version in his Black Basalt ware, using a cast bought in 1774 from the London plaster shop of Richard Parker. The original terracotta sculpture was inherited by Hogarth's widow and retained until her death in 1790. It was recorded in 1799 an engraving by Samuel Ireland, but the original is now lost.

Trump was approaching old age when he was included in Hogarth's 1745 painting The Painter and his Pug, sitting next to a self-portrait of the artist, along with an easel bearing Hogarth's symbolic line of beauty and works by Shakespeare, Swift, and Milton. (Hogarth had begun the work around 1735, but it originally appeared somewhat different, with Hogarth more formally dressed and wearing a wig, and without Trump.) According to Hogarth's biographer Ronald Paulson the painting contains many visual puns, with the dog alluding to Hogarth's own pugnaciousness; the allegorical fidelity of the dog to its master paralleling Hogarth's artistic fidelity of presentation; and Hogarth's portrait being (literally) supported by the English literary canon.

Hogarth included Trump in the 1746 portrait of Captain Lord George Graham in his Cabin, at the National Maritime Museum, along with Lord George Graham's own dog, which is sitting at the captain's feet and apparently joining in the singing. Trump sits on his haunches on a chair to the right of the painting, wearing Graham's wig, apparently reading from a sheet of music resting against a wine glass.

Hogarth was disparagingly nicknamed the "Painter Pugg", but Hogarth continued to use the dog as his trademark in a satirical 1763 engraving The Bruiser, based on his 1745 self-portrait with Trump. The Bruiser (a copy of which is held by the United States' National Gallery of Art) replaces Hogarth's portrait with the satirist Charles Churchill, lampooned as a drunken bear, while the dog urinates on a copy of the Epistle published by Churchill in support of John Wilkes, which criticised Hogarth.

Hogarth's strong identification with his dog led Paul Sandby to caricature Hogarth as a pug in his 1753 engraving Puggs Graces.

In 2001, a statue of Hogarth with Trump, made by Jim Mathieson, was unveiled by Ian Hislop and David Hockney on the Chiswick High Road, close to Hogarth's House, the artist's residence from 1749 until his death in 1764.

== In art ==
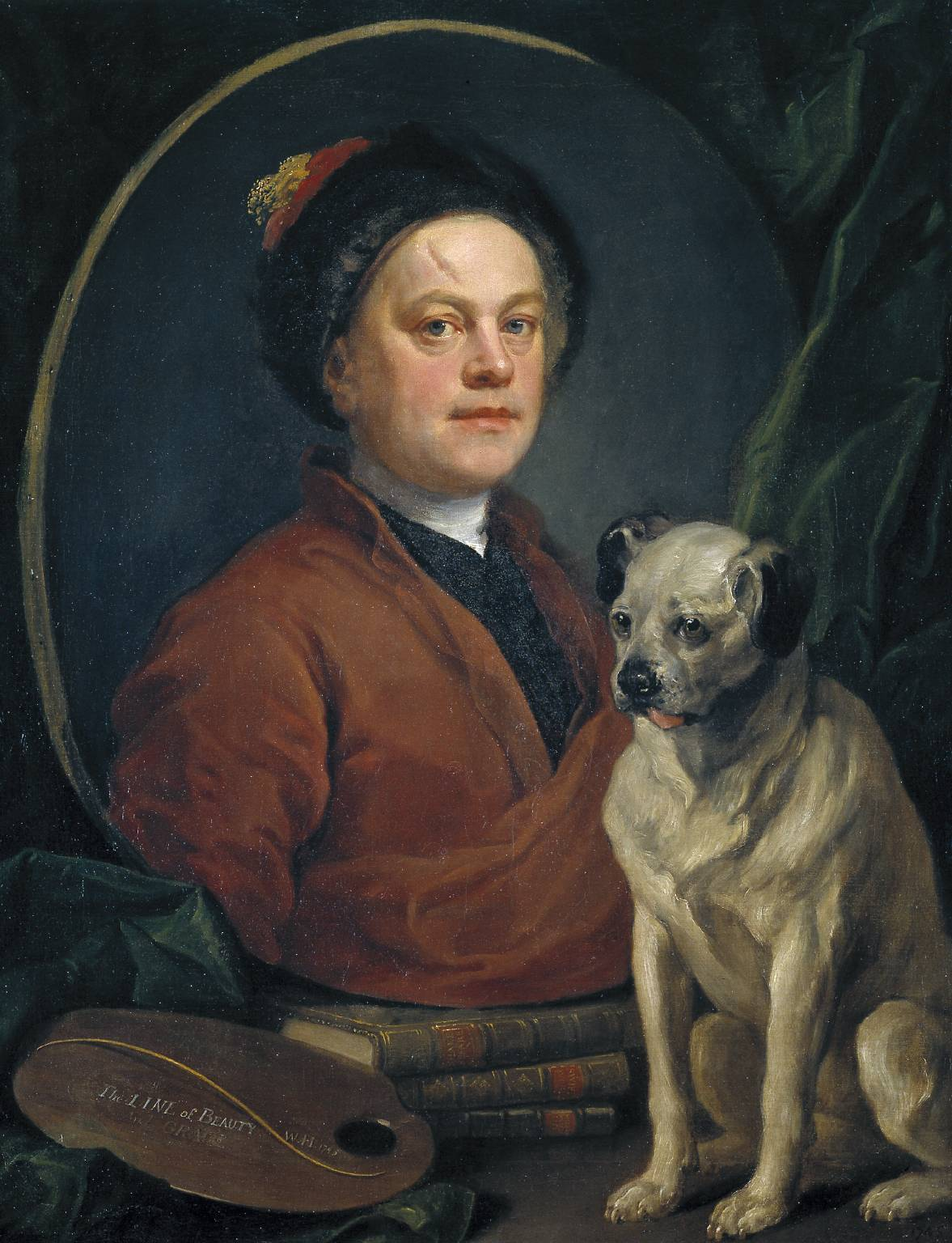
Painter and his Pug, William Hogarth, 1745, Tate Britain

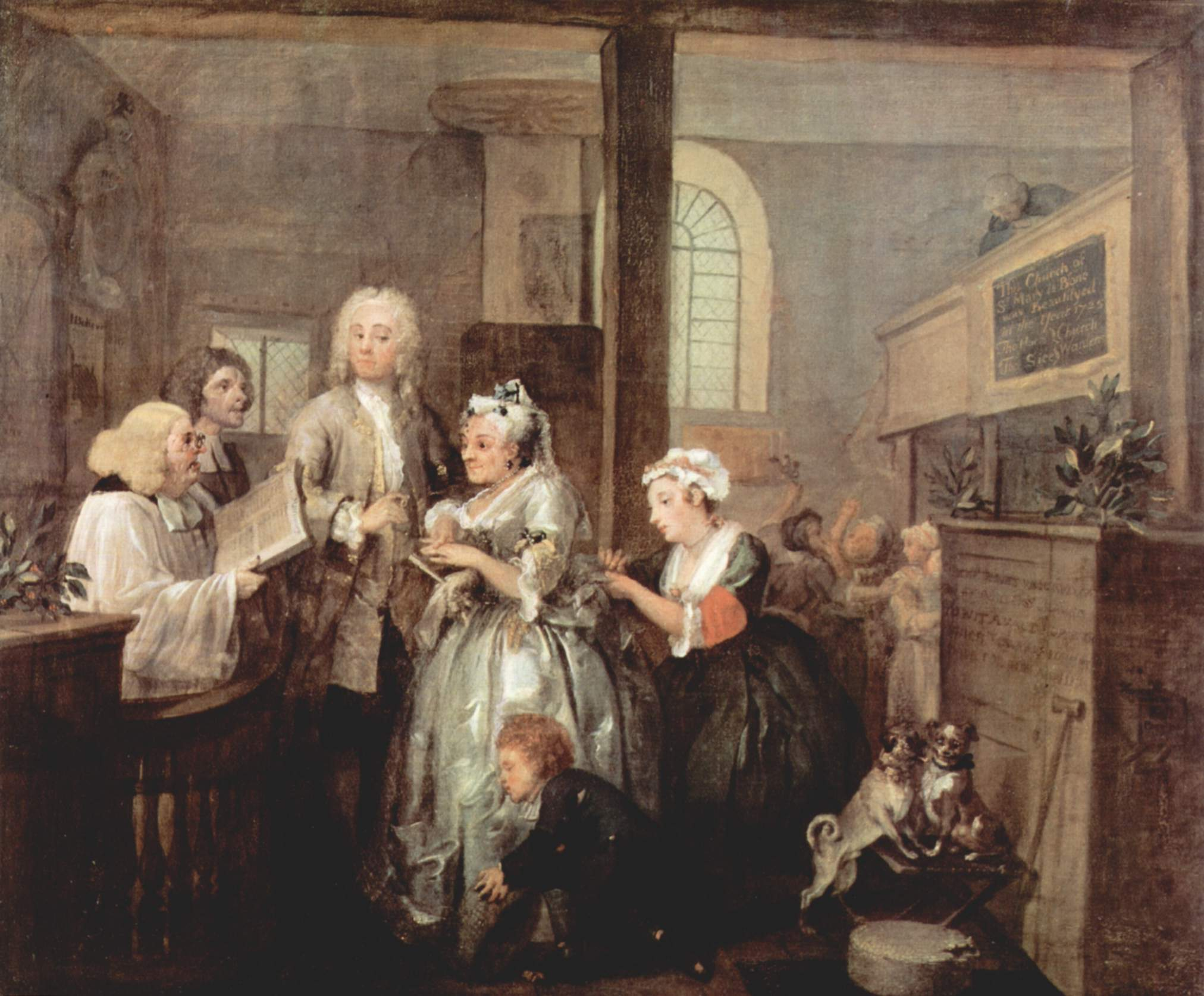
Fifth painting of A Rake's Progress: Married To An Old Maid, 1732–1734

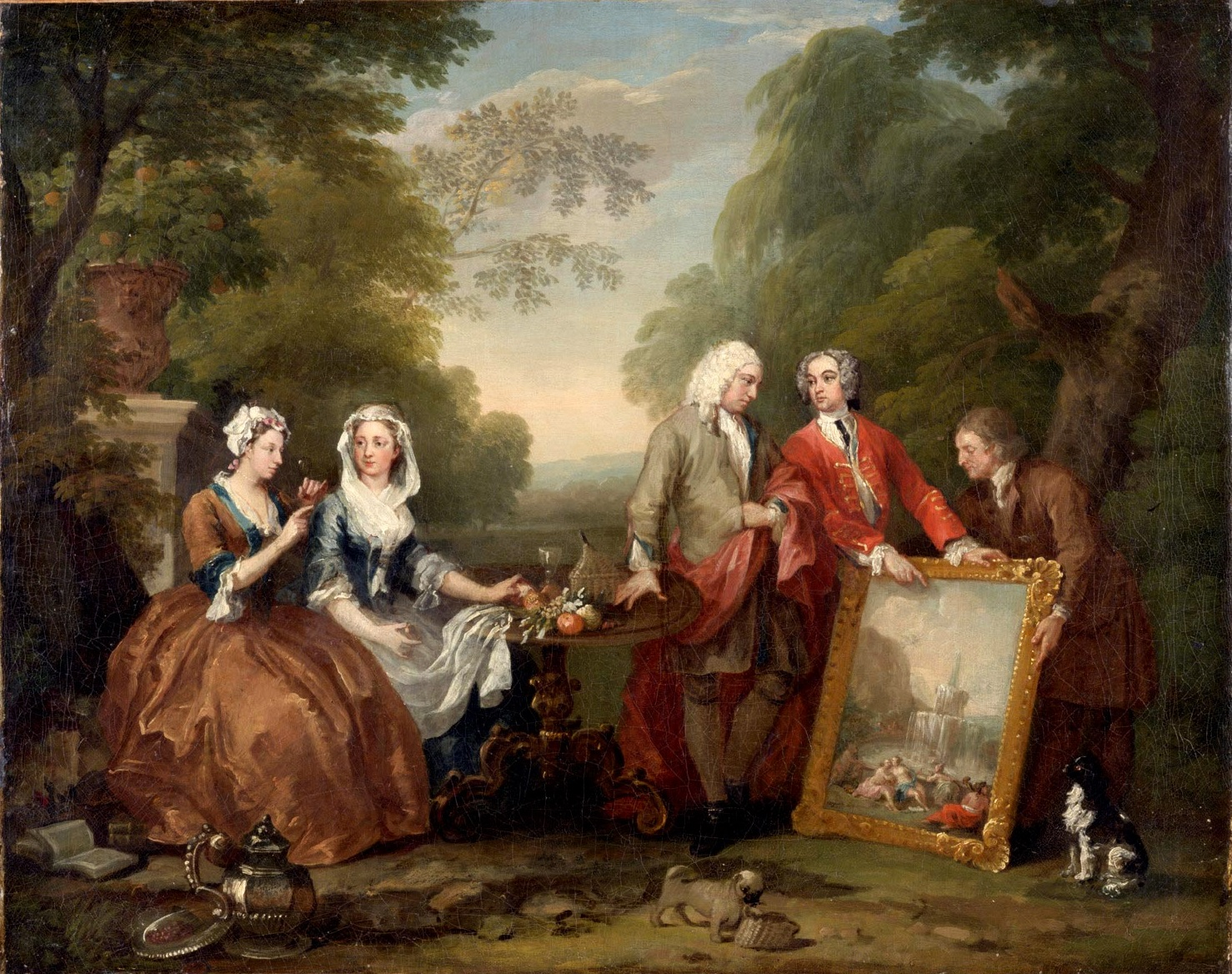
The Fountaine Family, 1730/1735, Philadelphia Museum of Art

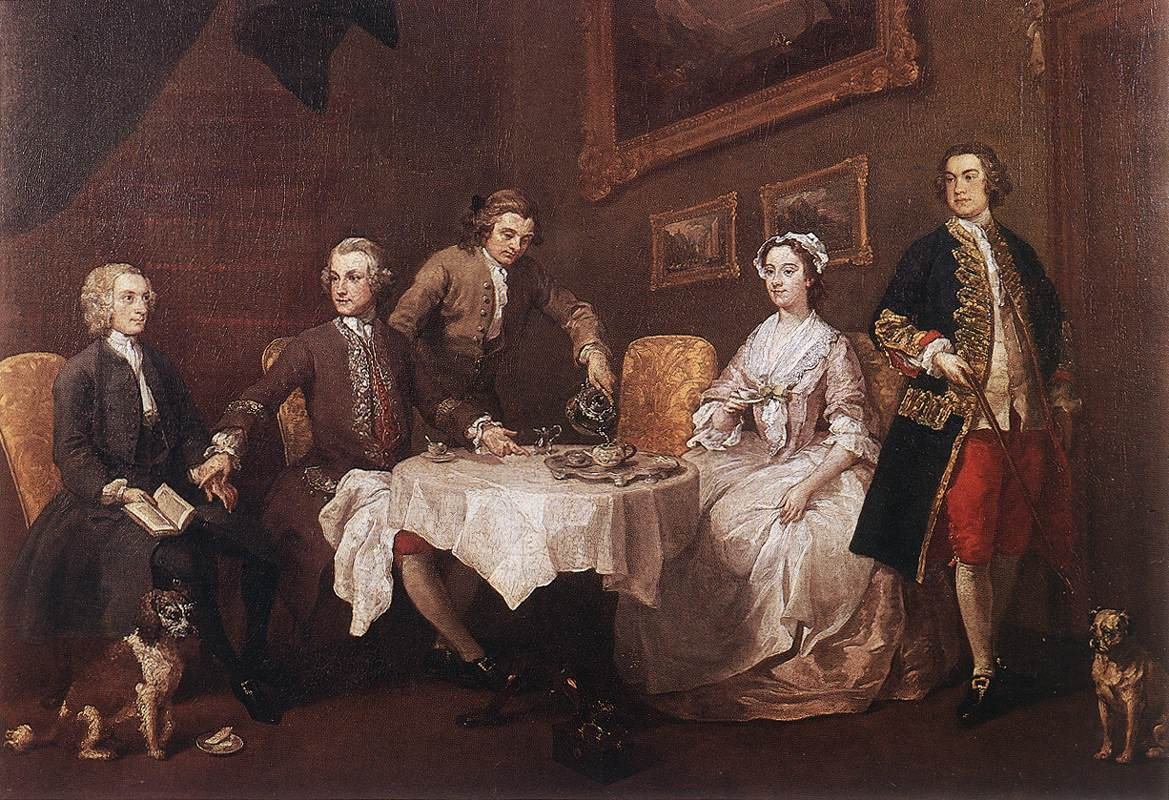
The Strode Family, 1738, Tate Britain

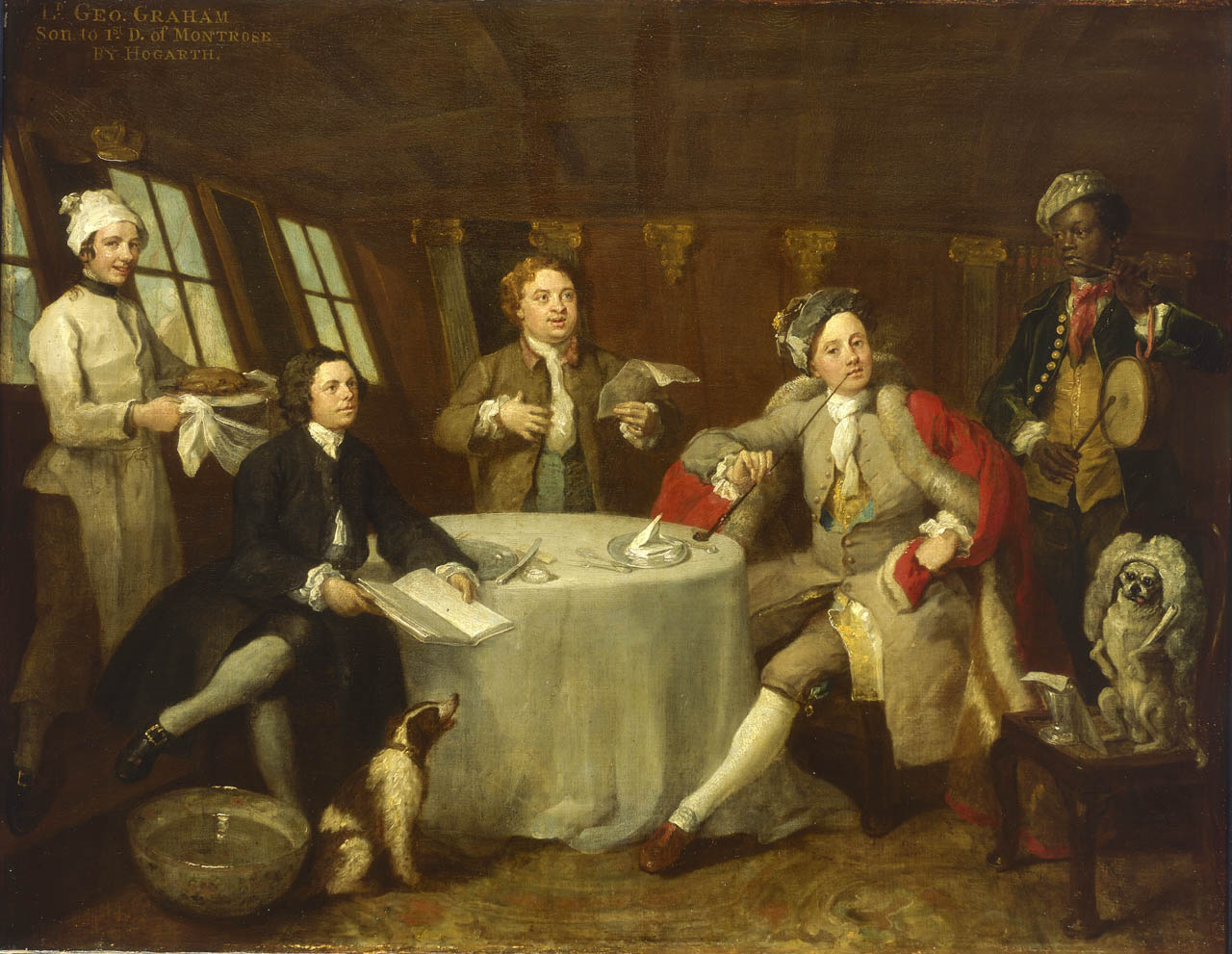
Captain Lord George Graham in his Cabin, 1746, National Maritime Museum

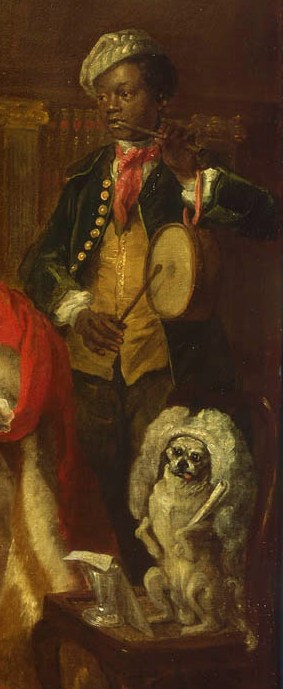
The black servant on the right of Lord George Graham painting plays a pipe and tabor. Below, Hogarth's pug dog Trump balances on a chair while wearing Graham's wig

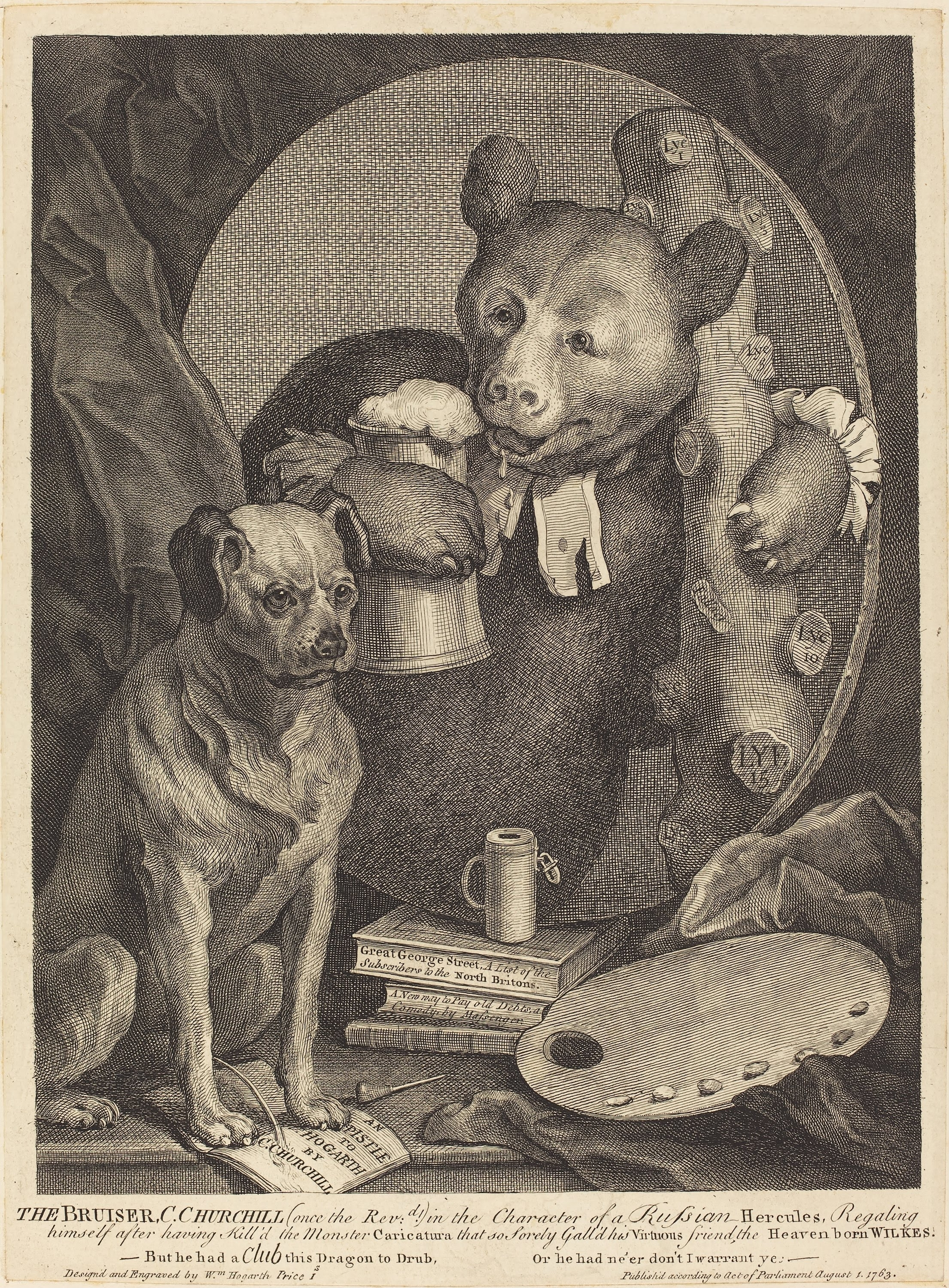
The Bruiser, 1763, National Gallery of Art

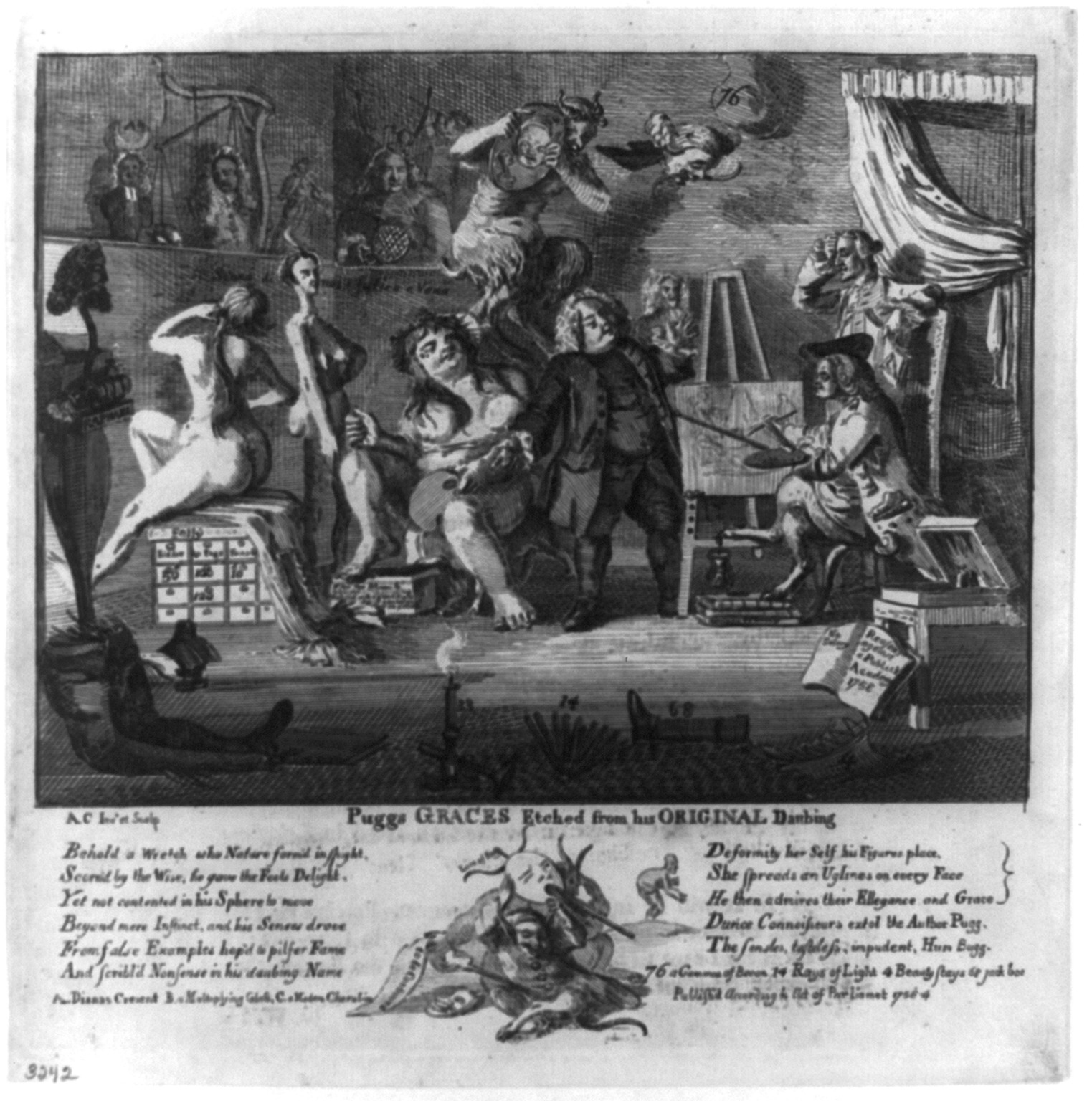
Paul Sandby, Puggs Graces, 1753

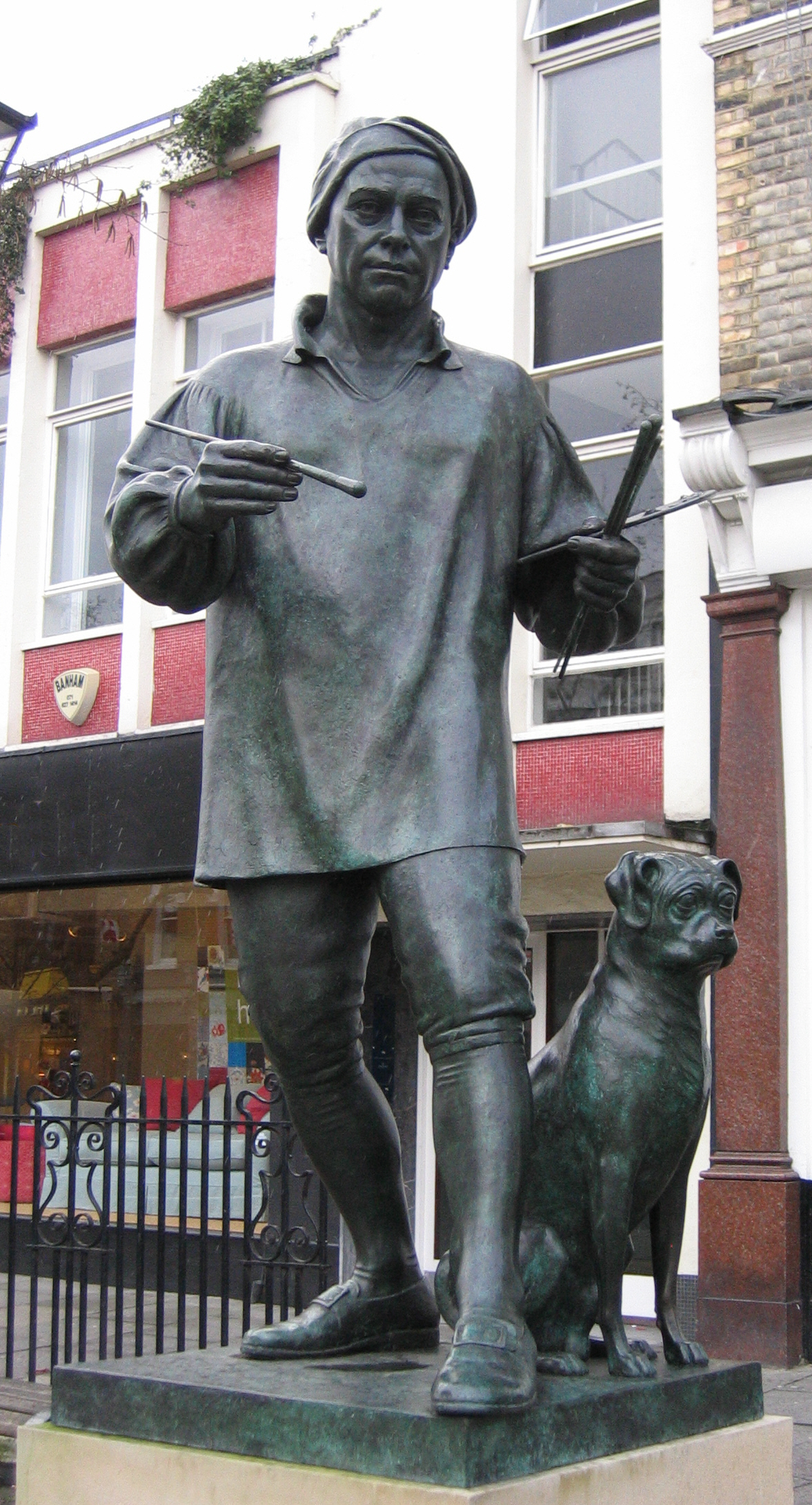
William Hogarth with Trump, 2001, statue by Jim Mathieson in Chiswick

== See also ==
- List of individual dogs
