= HMS St Florentine =

Ship of the line of the Royal Navy

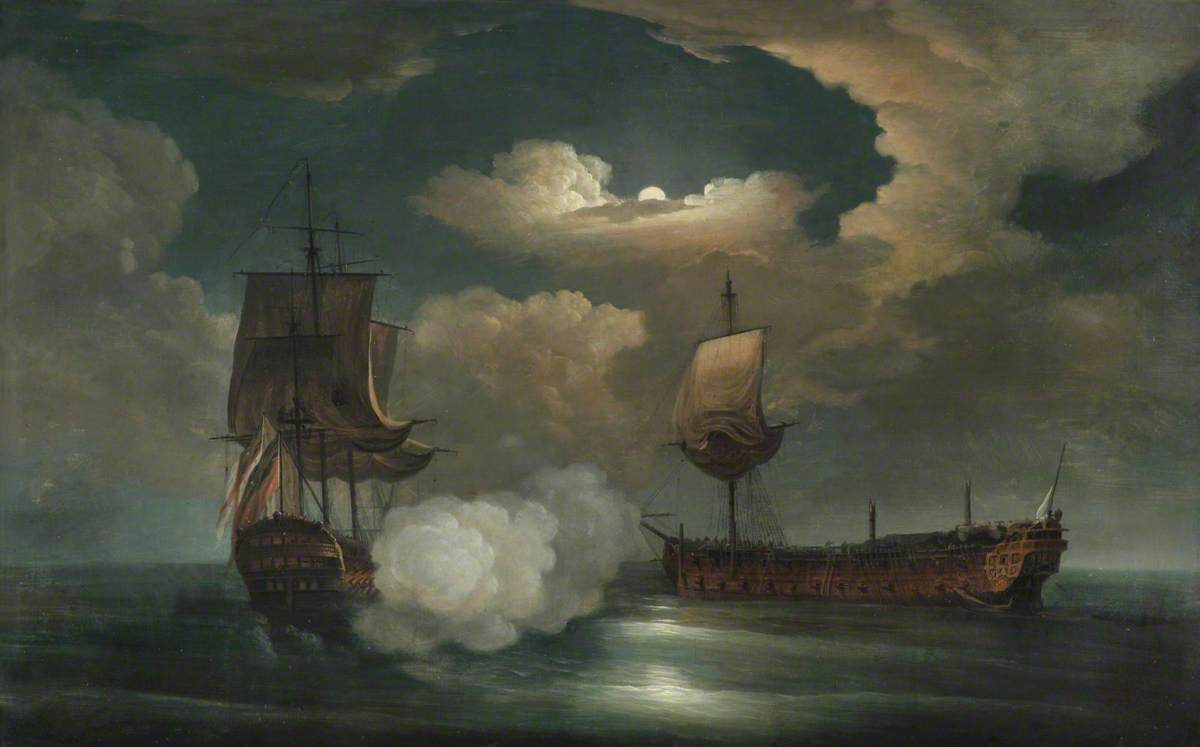
- The capture of Comte de St Florentine, by Dominic Serres

History

France
- Name: St Florentine
- Commissioned: April 1758
- Out of service: April 1759
- Captured: 4 April 1759, by Royal Navy

Great Britain
- Name: HMS St Florentine
- Acquired: 4 April 1759
- Commissioned: September 1759
- Decommissioned: May 1771
- In service: 1759-1771
- Fate: Sunk as breakwater, 1771

General characteristics
- Class & type: 60-gun fourth rate ship of the line
- Tons burthen: 110870/94 (bm)
- Length: 147 ft 9 1/2 in (45.0 m) (gundeck)
- Beam: 41 ft 7 in (12.67 m)
- Depth of hold: 17 ft 10 in (5.44 m)
- Propulsion: Sails
- Sail plan: Full-rigged ship
- Complement: 420
- Armament: 60 guns: Lower gundeck: 24 × 24 pdrs; Upper gundeck: 26 × 12 pdrs; Quarterdeck: 8 × 6 pdrs; Forecastle: 2 × 6 pdrs

St Florentine was a 60-gun coast guard vessel in service in support of the French Navy during the early days of the Seven Years' War, before being captured by Britain in 1759 and commissioned into the Royal Navy as HMS St Florentine.

Surplus to Navy requirements by 1771, St Florentine was decommissioned and sunk as a breakwater off the port of Sheerness.

== See also ==
- List of ships captured in the 18th century
