= William Gordon (Royal Navy officer, born 1705) =

Royal Navy officer (1705–1769)

Rear-Admiral William Gordon
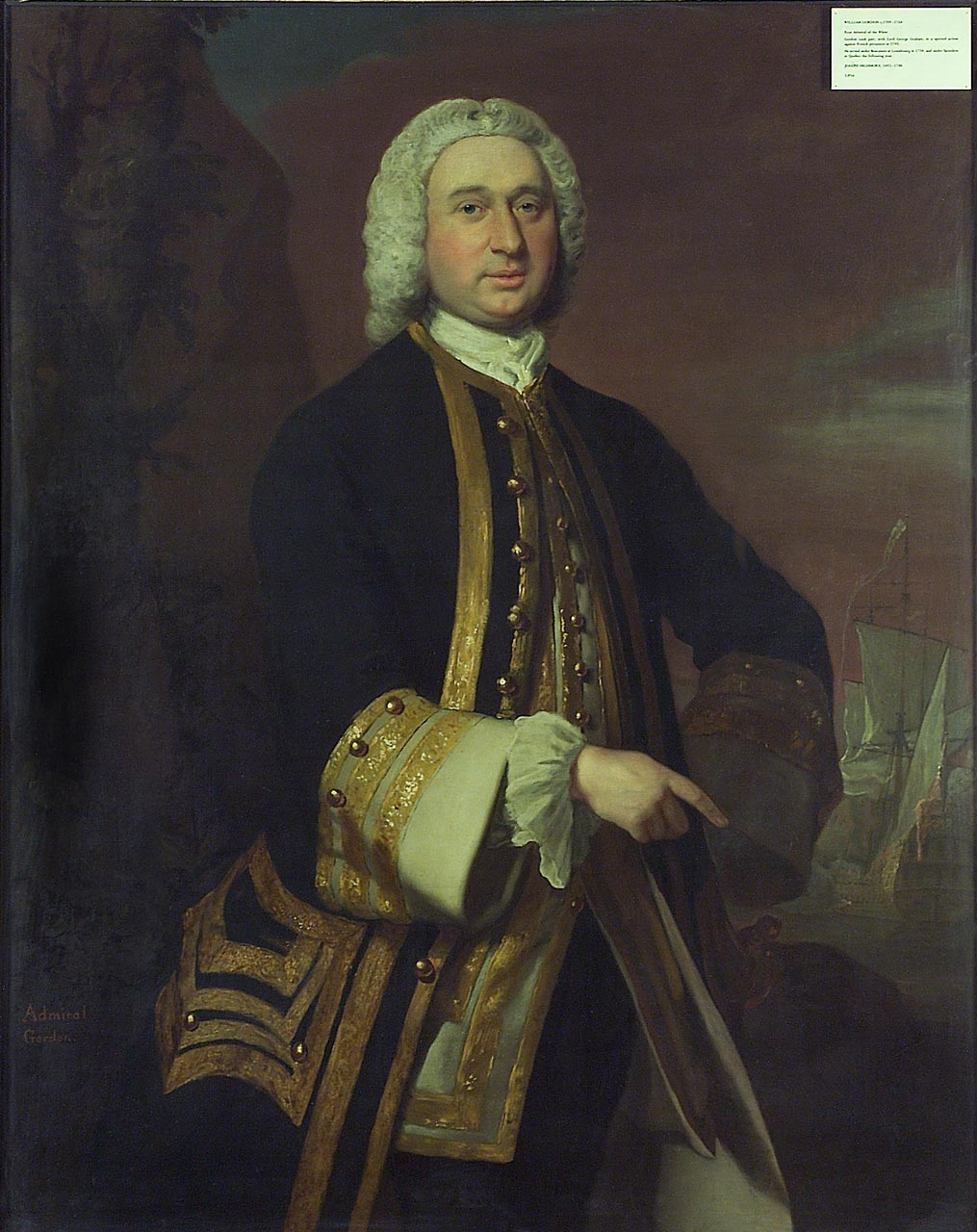
- Portrait by Joseph Highmore, c. 1750
- Born: 1705; Elgin, Moray
- Died: 7 April 1769 (aged 63–64); Banff, Aberdeenshire
- Burial place: St Mary's Kirkyard, Banff
- Spouse: Elizabeth Forbes
- Children: 2
- Military career
- Allegiance: Great Britain
- Branch: Royal Navy
- Service years: 1727–1769
- Rank: Rear admiral
- Commands: HMS Hound; HMS Gosport; HMS Sheerness; HMS Looe; HMS Chesterfield; HMS Assistance; HMS St Albans; HMS Cambridge; HMS Devonshire; HMS Blenheim; Nore Command
- Conflicts: War of the Austrian Succession; Seven Years' War; Siege of Louisbourg; Battle of the Plains of Abraham

Rear-Admiral William Gordon (1705 – 17 April 1769) was a Royal Navy officer who served as Commander-in-Chief, The Nore from 1762 to 1765.

== Naval career ==
Promoted to captain, Gordon became commanding officer of the 24-gun HMS Sheerness, and working with Lord George Graham commanding the 24-gun HMS Bridgewater and the armed vessel Ursula under Lieutenant Fergusson, he came across three large privateers from Dunkirk, sailing in company with their prizes on 2 July 1745. They had taken seven prizes, and were taking them into Dunkirk. The British force attacked them early in the morning of 3 July 1745. After a fierce fight lasting until 4am, four of the prizes surrendered to the Sheerness and the Ursula captured the remaining three prizes.

Gordon served at the Battle of Louisbourg in June 1758 and at the Capture of Quebec in September 1759 during the Seven Years' War. He went on to be commanding officer of the second-rate HMS Blenheim in July 1761. Appointed a commodore, he became Commander-in-Chief, The Nore in April 1762. He was promoted to rear-admiral of the white and is buried at St Mary's Kirkyard in Banff.

== Personal life ==
Carmelite House, at 28 Low Street in Banff, was built in 1753 for Gordon.

== Gallery ==
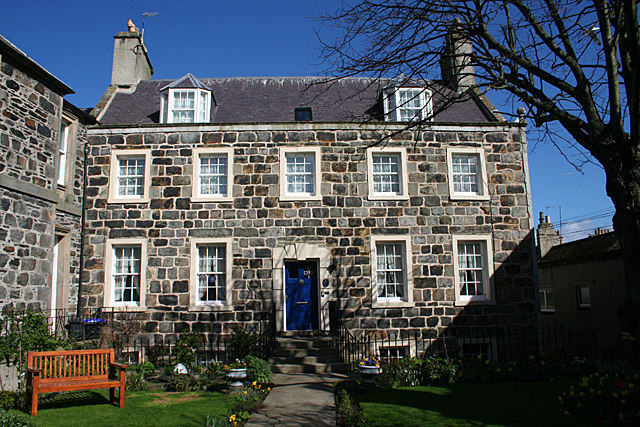
Carmelite House in Banff, Gordon's former home
