= Patrick Moya =

French artist

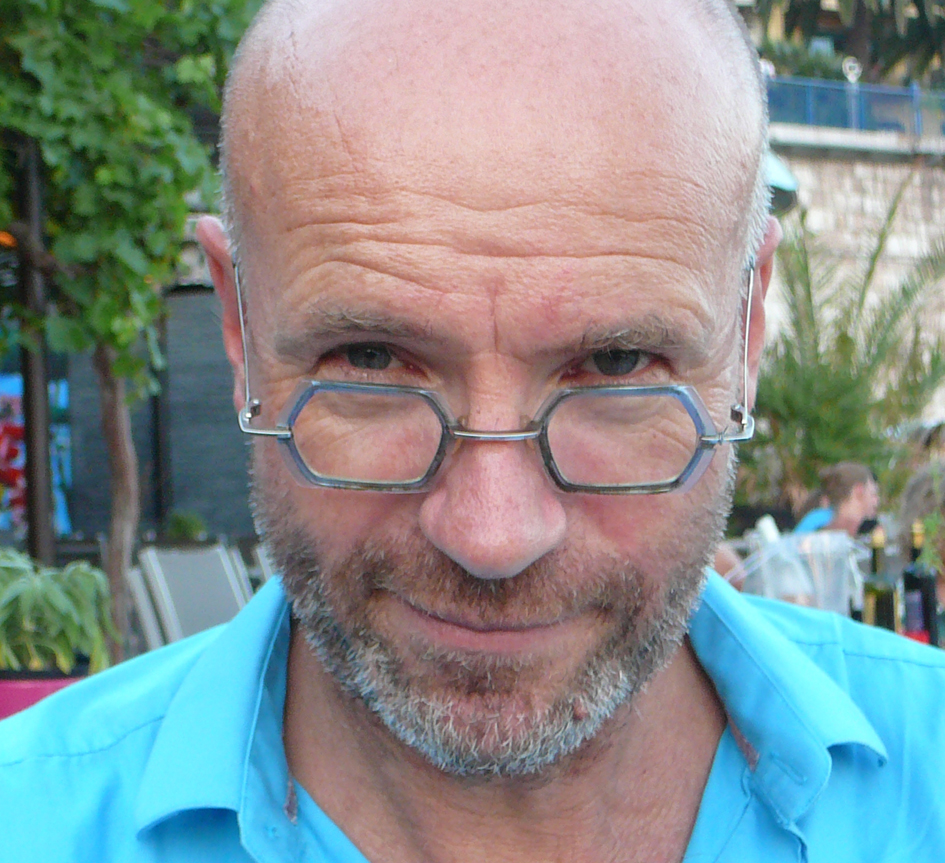
- Moya in Nice in 2010
- Born: 15 December 1955; Troyes, France
- Education: Villa Arson
- Movement: figurative art, painting, sculpture, live painting,drawing, ceramic, digital art, metaverse art

Patrick Moya is a French visual artist born on December 15, 1955, in Troyes, from a Spanish father. He lives and works in Nice, south of the France. He works in painting, sculpture, drawing, ceramic art, happening, live painting, art installation and digital art.

== Biography ==
After studying art at the Villa Arson in Nice (1974-1977), Patrick Moya become, during ten years, a nude model for drawing schools, while reading McLuhan and continuing to think about "the place of the artist in new media" (in particular live television). In 1982, he published, with Bramstocker, a small booklet in photocopy entitled "Théorie de l'art d'un modèle aux Beaux-Arts", where we see expressed most of the ideas on which his future work is based: "the message is the medium. The only message I have to convey is ME. I am the medium. In live television, the real medium... is the man". In the early 1980s, he started assimilating his signature to his artwork. For example, in 1991 he built a steel sculpture in Taiwan with the four letters of his name during a sculpture symposium for the garden of the Kaohsiung Museum of Fine Arts.

1996, he made his first exhibition in a museum for the Museum of Modern and Contemporary Art in Nice. In summer 2011, the story of Moya civilization was depicted on the walls of the La Malmaison art center in Cannes. This exhibition allowed visitors to meet the artist from a distance and ask questions.

In December 2015, he returned to his hometown of Troyes for an installation, where he painted the entire exhibition on the walls of the Maison du Boulanger murals which would be removed at the end of the exhibition. Then, Moya was chosen by the curator of the [[Ducal Palace, Mantua|Palazzo Ducale in Mantua]], Peter Assmann, for a monographic exhibition in the cantina, under the title "Il laboratory della metamorfosi" (the laboratory of metamorphoses). In December 2017, a retrospective in the "Espace Lympia", with the support of Alpes Maritimes department, with the title "Le Cas Moya / l’exposition" was set up in Nice. The scenography of the exhibition presented all the different sides of his universe, depicting its history; from its infancy to the metaverse.

In 2018, Moya exhibited at the Palazzo Saluzzo Paesana, Torino, Italy. In 2019, Moya exhibited several large-format paintings, a series of neo-classical portraits in reference to the house of Borboun, as well as videos showing his virtual universe, at the Royal Palace of Caserta for one month. After the inauguration of "the New Moya Chapel" in June 2019, a little chapel with painted walls and ceiling in the village of Le Mas, he painted in situ, an ephemeral mural on the walls of a room of the Massena Museum in Nice.

In November 2020, a new exhibition "La Télé de Moya" (The Moya TV) showed his first projects and theories about live television as the future of art at the L'Artistique art center in Nice. In 2022, a new biography called "Le Cas Moya", (the Case for Moya) was published. For the spring/summer collection 2023 of Baby Dior, he signed with Christian Dior Couture for the creation of a rabbit and an original calligraphy for the name of DIOR. The magazine Avenue Montaigne announced: "In collaboration with the French artist Patrick Moya, Baby Dior presents a resolutely pop capsule. Inhabited by the singular and plural aesthetics of the visual artist-performer from Nice, the creations feature a cheerful pink rabbit celebrating the Chinese zodiac sign of the year 2023".

On June 16 of 2023, the inauguration of Christian Estrosi, the mayor of Nice, a resin sculpture 240 cm high was officially installed on Place du Pin. After a new retrospective entitled "Welcome to Moyaland" at the Château de Courcelles in Montigny-lès-Metz (May/July 2023), he now chooses to show different facets of his work: ceramics, which he has been practicing for a long time (Terra Rossa ceramics museum in Salernes, June/October 2023, his interpretation of the classics in painting (Galleria Centro Steccata in Parma, "La storia dell'arte di Moya", March/April 2024), his "Alphabet" (26 canvases, Arcades cultural center in Antibes, March/June 2025 and his performances (Grimaldi castle-museum in Cagnes-sur-mer, March/June 2025).

== In the virtual world ==
In October 2008, he participated in an international exhibition called "Rinascimento virtuale" (Virtual Renaissance), initiated by the Italian journalist Mario Gerosa, which took place in the National Museum of Anthropology and Ethnology in the city of Florence in Italy, where an entire room was devoted to the "Moya civilization".

Since 2008, he was considered a digital artist. Since 2009, he's been hosting "the Cyber Carnival" every year in partnership with the Nice Tourism Office. During the Covid 19 health crisis, the 2021 edition of the Nice carnival was cancelled, but it was possible to experience a virtual version of this carnival in the virtual Moyaland. In 2022, Moyaland is « une destination touristique dans le métavers » (a new tourist destination in the metaverse).
