= Jim Mathieson (sculptor) =

British-Indian sculptor (1931–2003)

James William Mathieson
- Born: James William Mathieson; 21 June 1931; Calcutta, India
- Died: 12 April 2003 (aged 71)
- Education: City and Guilds of London Art School
- Known for: Sculpture
- Notable work: Statue of William Hogarth and his pug dog

James William Mathieson (21 June 1931 – 12 April 2003) was a British Indian sculptor.

== Biography ==
=== Early life ===
Mathieson was born in Calcutta, India, and attended the Lawrence Royal Military School in Simla Hills. His parents hoped that he and his brother David would become army officers. When the British began to leave India, he moved with his family to Scotland in 1947. Despite showing early skill in art, his father refused to fund his art studies. As a young adult, he completed national service, then worked in insurance while completing his school studies (O- and A-levels) at evening classes. He joined the Campaign for Nuclear Disarmament in 1960, becoming an active member. He campaigned against the Suez Crisis and joined both the Communist Party and the Committee of 100. He was arrested twice while protesting.

=== Career ===
In 1964, at the age of 34, he started a four-year art course at City and Guilds of London Art School in London. Following this, between 1969 and 1979, he taught part-time at the Sir John Cass and Ealing schools of art, teaching aspects of sculpture. While still studying, he was chosen to cast Prince of Wales's crown for the investiture of Charles at Caernarvon Castle in 1969.

From 1979, he worked full-time as a sculptor. His best-known sculpture is of the artist William Hogarth and his pug dog Trump, which stands on Chiswick High Road, London. This was unveiled by Ian Hislop and David Hockney in October 2001. While he did create portrait and figurative sculptures, he most enjoyed abstract sculpture. In his abstract work he tried to capture the "essential qualities that express this miracle of life". Between 1984 and 1998 he sculpted portraits for Madame Tussauds as a way to make money while pursuing his personal art.

=== Personal life ===
Mathieson married Edna Skinner in 1959. They had a daughter, but she died as a baby in 1964. He and Edna had a second daughter, named Catherine, in 1966. Mathieson divorced Edna in 1979 and later married Judy Craig in 1981. Judy Craig, also a sculptor, became the head of the portrait studio at Madame Tussauds.

He was diagnosed with cancer in 1992. Mathieson died in April 2003, and was survived by his wife, his daughter, his stepson, and three grandchildren.
