= Ronald Paulson =

American writer and academic (1930–2024)

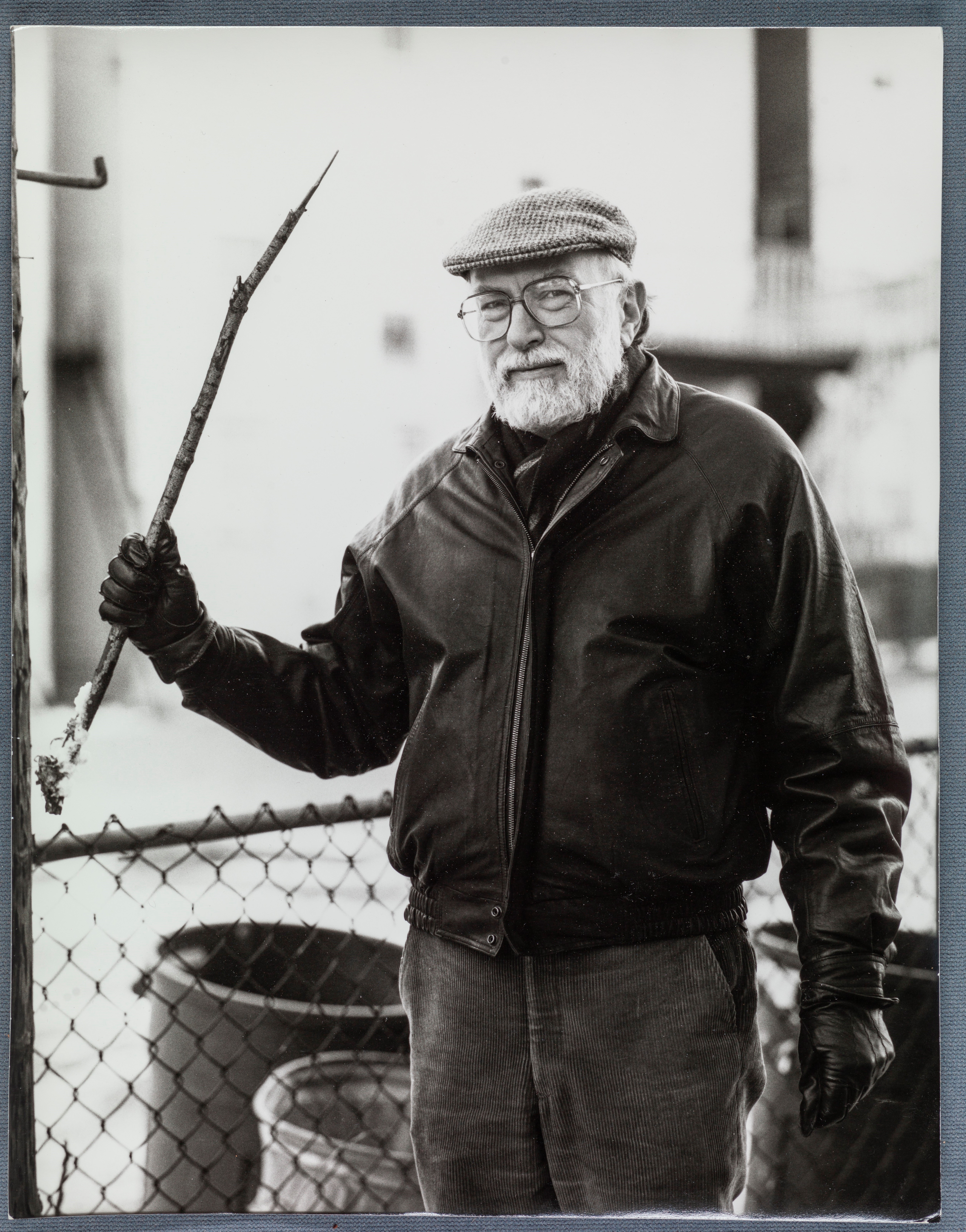
- Born: May 27, 1930; Bottineau, North Dakota, U.S.
- Died: August 7, 2024 (aged 94); Baltimore, Maryland, U.S.
- Education: Yale University
- Occupations: Writer, professor
- Known for: Biography and monographs on William Hogarth

Ronald Howard Paulson (May 27, 1930 – August 7, 2024) was an American writer and professor of English who was a specialist in English 18th-century art and culture, and the world's leading expert on English artist William Hogarth.

== Education ==
Paulson earned a Bachelor of Arts degree from Yale University in 1952, where he was an editorial associate of the campus humor magazine The Yale Record. He earned his doctorate degree from Yale in 1958.

== Academic career ==
Paulson taught and held various administrative positions at several universities in the United States, including the University of Illinois from 1959 to 1963 and Rice University from 1963 to 1967. He was the Chairman of the Johns Hopkins University English Department from 1967 to 1975. From 1975 to 1984 he was a professor at Yale University and served as the Director of Graduate Studies in the English Department from 1976 to 1983 and the Director of the British Studies Program from 1976 to 1984.

Paulson returned to Johns Hopkins University in 1984, serving as the Department Chairman from 1985 to 1991.

He was a member of the editorial board of the academic journal ELH: English Literary History and was senior editor from 1985 to 2004; he served on the editorial boards of the journals Studies in English Literature; PMLA; Eighteenth-Century Studies; and the Johns Hopkins University Press.

On Paulson’s 3 vol. Hogarth,: “it must be the most detailed and the most deeply pondered monograph on a British artist ever written” (Michael Kitson, Painting in Britain, 1530-1790).

== Death ==
Paulson died in Baltimore on August 7, 2024, at the age of 94.

== Honors and recognitions ==
Paulson was the Andrew W. Mellon Professor of the Humanities at Johns Hopkins University from 1973 to 1975 and was the Mayer Professor of Humanities since 1985. He was a member of the Academic and Advisory Committees and Governing Board of the Yale Center for British Art and the Paul Mellon Centre for British Art in London from 1975 to 1984. He also was a Guggenheim Fellow (1965–66, 1986–87), an NEH Senior Fellow (1977–78), and a fellow of the Rockefeller Foundation (1978, 1987).

In 1988, Paulson traveled with several humorists from the United States to the Soviet Union as part of a cultural exchange.

== Books ==
- Theme and Structure in Swift's 'Tale of a Tub' (1960)
- Hogarth's Graphic Works (1965)
- The Fictions of Satire (1967)
- Satire and the Novel in Eighteenth-Century England (1967)
- Hogarth: His Life, Art, and Times (1971)
- Rowlandson: A New Interpretation (1972)
- Emblem and Expression: Meaning in English Art of the Eighteenth Century (1975)
- The Art of Hogarth (1975)
- Popular and Polite Art in the Age of Hogarth and Fielding (1979)
- Literary Landscape: Turner and Constable (1982)
- Representations of Revolution (1789–1820) (1983)
- Book and Painting: Shakespeare, Milton, and the Bible (1983)
- Breaking and Remaking: Aesthetic Practice in England, 1700–1820 (1989)
- Hogarth's Graphic Works (rewritten and reset) (1989)
- Figure & Abstraction in Contemporary Painting (1990)
- Hogarth, Vols. 1–3 (1991–93)
- The Beautiful, Novel, and Strange: Aesthetics and Heterodoxy (1997)
- The Analysis of Beauty (editor) (1997)
- Don Quixote in England: The Aesthetics of Laughter (1998)
- The Life of Henry Fielding (2000)
- Hogarth's Harlot: Sacred Parody in Enlightenment England (2003)
- Sin and Evil: Moral Values in Literature (2006)
- The Art of Riot in England and America (2010)
