= Conrad Shawcross =

British artist (born 1977)

Conrad Shawcross RA
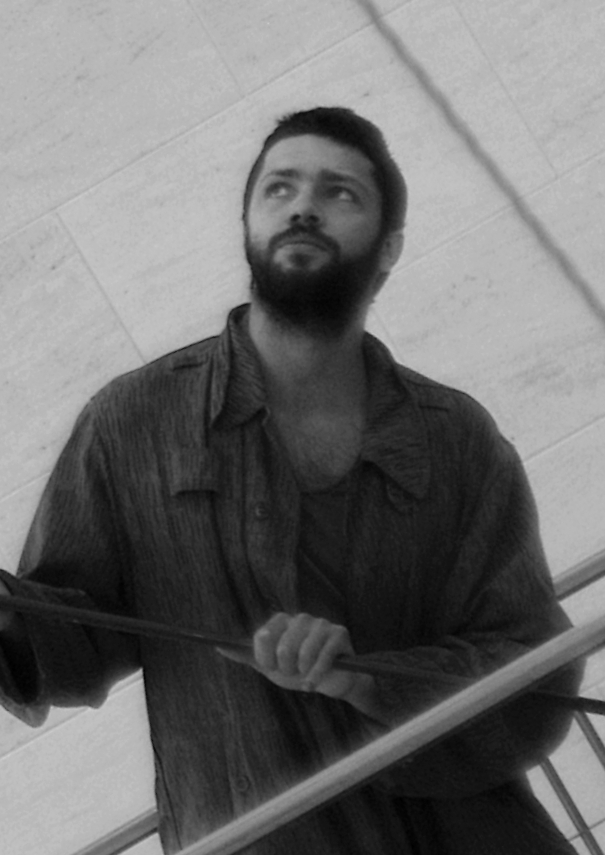
- Shawcross posing, in 2011
- Born: 26 April 1977 (age 49); London, United Kingdom
- Education: Ruskin School of Drawing and Fine Art, University of Oxford; Slade School of Fine Art, University College London
- Spouse: Carolina Mazzolari (m. 2013)
- Children: 1 + 2 stepchildren
- Parent(s): William Shawcross; Marina Warner
- Elected: Member, Royal Academy of Arts
- Website: conradshawcross.com

Conrad Hartley Pelham Shawcross (born 26 April 1977) is a British artist specializing in mechanical sculptures based on philosophical and scientific ideas. When he was elected, Shawcross was the youngest living member of the Royal Academy of Arts.

== Early life ==
Born in London, Shawcross is the son of biographer William Shawcross and the novelist, mythographer, and cultural historian Marina Warner. His paternal grandfather was Sir Hartley Shawcross. Through his mother, he is the great grandson of cricketer Sir Pelham Warner.

Shawcross studied at Westminster School, the Chelsea School of Art, the Ruskin School of Drawing and Fine Art (while a member of Lady Margaret Hall, Oxford), and the Slade School of Fine Art (University College London).

== Career ==
Imbued with an appearance of scientific rationality, Shawcross's sculptures explore subjects that lie on the borders of geometry and philosophy, physics and metaphysics. Attracted by failed quests for knowledge in the past, he often appropriates redundant theories and methodologies to create ambitious structural and mechanical montages, using a wide variety of materials and media.

Shawcross was included in the 2001 exhibition of British art school graduates Bloomberg New Contemporaries. His work came to prominence at the 2004 New Blood exhibition at the Saatchi Gallery at London County Hall. He exhibited The Nervous System, a large, symmetrical, working loom producing over 20,000 metres of double-helix coloured rope every week.

In December 2004, Shawcross' commission Continuum opened at the National Maritime Museum, Greenwich, an installation on time and maritime themes made specifically to match the history and architecture of the venue, the Queen's House.

Installations in 2009-2010 include a horizontal rope machine in the Holborn Tunnel, and a vast 60 foot high vertical version, Nervous System (Inverted) in the Sculpture Gallery, 590 Madison Avenue, New York, New York. A 14 metre long spiral cast in aluminium, Fraction (9:8), was unveiled in 2010 at the Sadler Building at the Oxford Science Park. Several of Shawcross' works were shown in the inaugural exhibition at Turner Contemporary in Margate in 2011.

More recently, Shawcross has developed the scale of his practice, taking on architectural spaces with work that combines epic scope and poetic grace. Timepiece was a major new commission for the Roundhouse in 2013 in which Shawcross transformed the iconic main space of this historic London building into a vast timekeeping device.

In 2015, a new series of permanent sculptures, Three Perpetual Chords was unveiled in Dulwich Park, London, following a commission by Southwark Council advised by the Contemporary Art Society to replace works by Barbara Hepworth that were stolen in 2011. In the same year the artist also unveiled a new site-specific installation for the Royal Academy's Annenberg Courtyard as part of the Summer Exhibition. This followed his invitation, along with Chris Ofili and Mark Wallinger, to create works inspired by Titian's masterpieces for the project Metamorphosis: Titian 2012, an ambitious collaboration with the National Gallery and Royal Ballet for the Cultural Olympiad.

Shawcross was Artist in Residence at the Science Museum, London, from 2009 - 2011, and his first public realm commission Space Trumpet, installed in the atrium of the refurbished Unilever House in London in 2007, won the Art & Work 2008 Award for a Work of Art Commissioned for a Specific Site in a Working Environment. In 2009 he was awarded the Illy prize for best solo presentation at Art Brussels. In 2014 he won the Jack Goldhill Award for sculpture at the Royal Academy Summer Exhibition.

On Greenwich Peninsula in south east London, the 49 m high tower of a district heating energy centre, designed by C. F. Møller Architects and due to be completed in 2016, is clad in a complex metal cladding formed of hundreds of triangular patterns, designed by Shawcross.

Sample of artworks by Conrad Shawcross
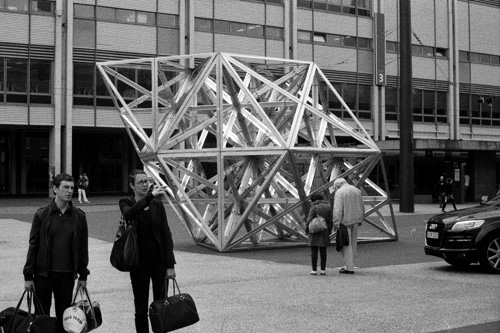
Wooden sculpture by Shawcross in Basel, Switzerland.

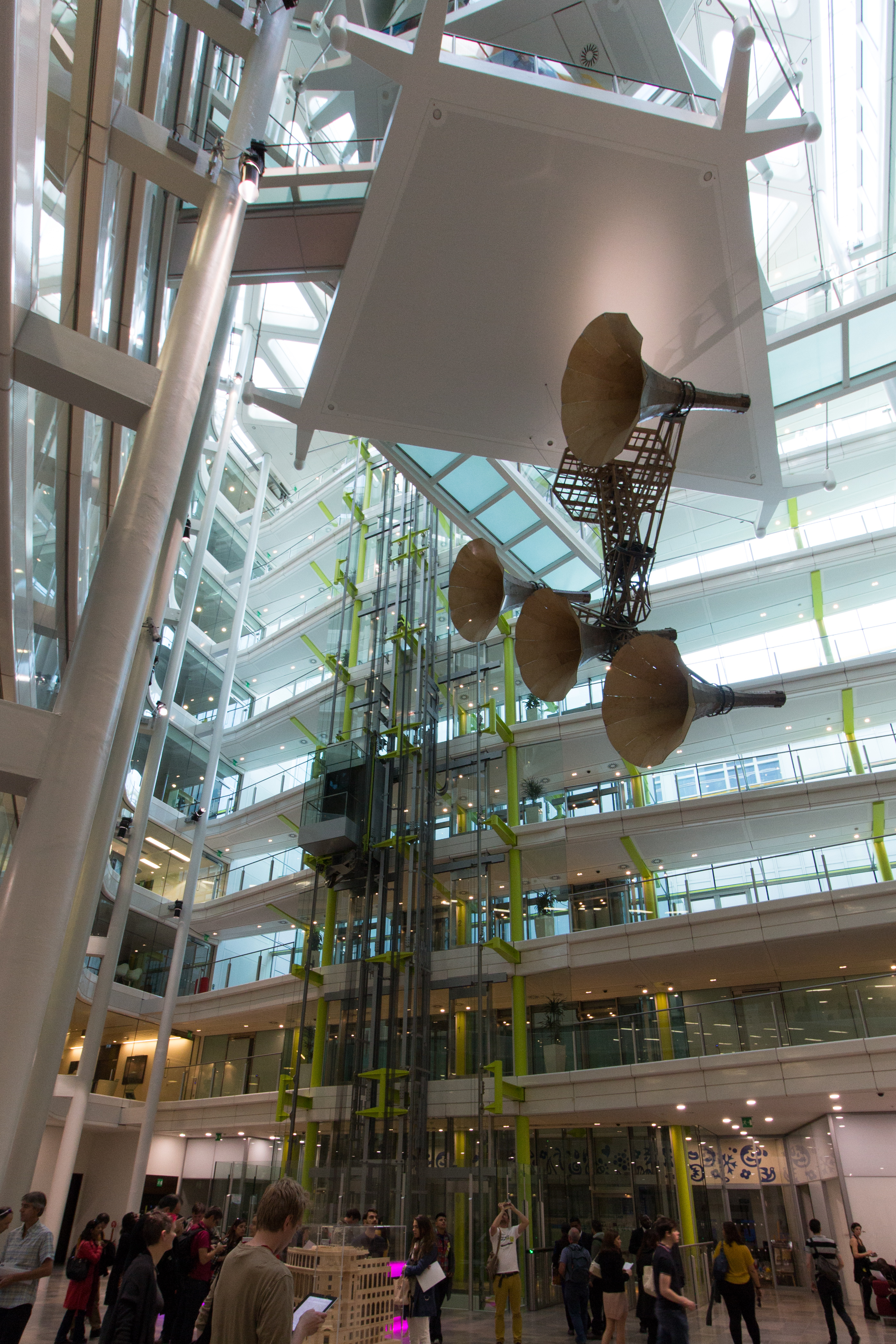
Space Trumpet in Unilever House, London.

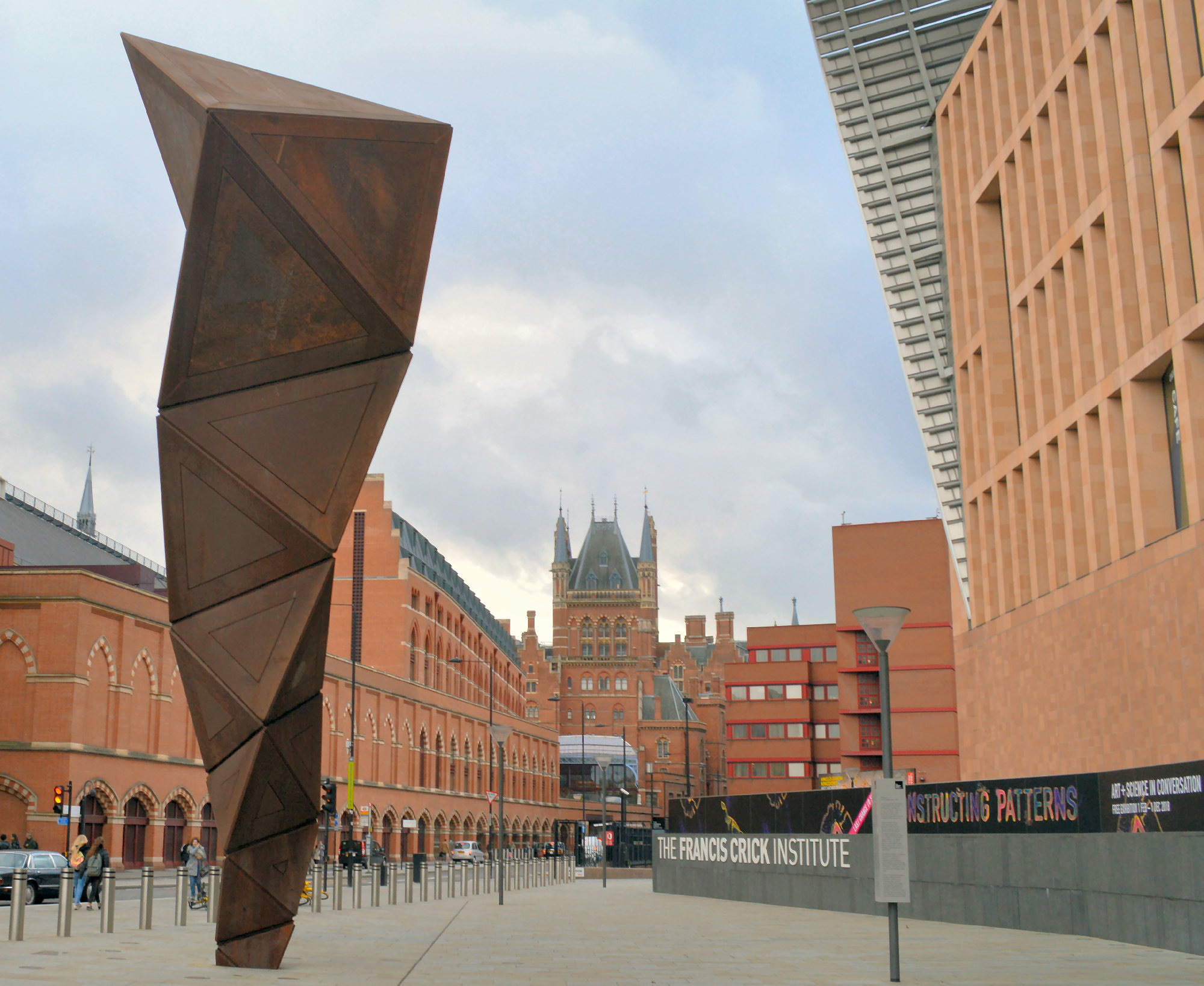
Paradigm, statue located outside the Francis Crick Institute.

== Personal life ==
Shawcross had a long-term relationship with theatre and opera director Sophie Hunter whom he met while studying at Oxford. The couple split in early 2010.

In 2013, Shawcross married Italian artist Carolina Mazzolari; they have one son, and he has two stepchildren by her.
