= HMS Bridgewater (1744) =

Sixth-rate Royal Navy vessel

History

Great Britain
- Name: Bridgewater
- Ordered: 13 December 1743
- Builder: George Rowcliffe, Northam
- Laid down: 20 December 1743
- Launched: 13 October 1744
- Completed: January 1745
- Commissioned: October 1744
- In service: 1744–1749; 1754–1758
- Out of service: 1749–1754
- Fate: Burnt to avoid capture, 1758

General characteristics
- Class & type: 24-gun sixth rate
- Tons burthen: 499 64/94 bm
- Length: 112 ft 2.5 in (34.2 m) (gundeck); 91 ft 6 in (27.9 m) (keel)
- Beam: 32 ft 0.5 in (9.8 m)
- Depth of hold: 11 ft 0 in (3.4 m)
- Complement: 160
- Armament: 20 × 9 pdrs (upper deck); 2 × 9 pdrs (lower deck); 2 × 3 pdrs (quarterdeck)

HMS Bridgewater was a 24-gun sixth rate of the Royal Navy which saw active service as a privateer-hunter in British waters from 1745 to 1749, during which time she captured six enemy vessels. Under repair from 1750 to 1754, she then returned to service as part of a squadron patrolling the Coromandel coast in India during the Seven Years' War. Trapped by the French off Fort St. David in 1758, she was run aground and burned to avoid being captured.

== Construction ==
Bridgewater was built to Admiralty Orders at private dockyards at Northam under supervision from master shipwright George Rowcliffe. Plans for her design were from the 1741 modifications to the 1719 Establishment, distinctive when compared with previous designs for being heavier and able to carry a pair of lower deck gunports in addition to the traditional 20 upper deck guns. Her keel was laid on 20 December 1743 with construction running until October 1744. As built, the vessel was 112 ft 2.5 in (34.2 m) long with a 91 ft 6 in (27.9 m) keel, a beam of 32 ft 0.5 in (9.8 m) and a hold depth of 11 ft 0 in (3.4 m). Her initial armament was 20 guns, increased to 24 guns when fitted out at Portsmouth Dockyard in 1745. when fully armed she carried 20 nine-pounder cannons along her upper deck, two nine-pounder guns on the lower deck and two three-pounder guns on the quarterdeck. Her designated Royal Navy complement was 160 officers and ratings.

== Active service ==
Bridgewater was commissioned in October 1744 under Captain John Hardy, and sailed from Northam to Portsmouth to complete her fitout and take on additional cannons. Command was then passed to Captain Lord George Graham who put to sea to hunt privateers preying on British shipping off the coast of Dunkirk. Success came quickly; on 3 July 1745 Bridgewater was in company with HMS Sheerness when she encountered and seized three vessels, the 28-gun Le Royal, the 26-gun La Duchess de Penthierre and a 12-gun dogger. Also seized were seven merchant vessels that the privateers had taken; these ten captured ships were returned to England.

Bridgewater's command was passed briefly to Captain Thomas Stanhope, then in January 1746 to Captain Charles Knowler as part of a squadron sent to patrol the coasts of Scotland. Three more victories followed in 1747; the French privateer La Marguerite was taken on 6 July, La Tourterelle on 6 October and the 18-gun Le Jason on 3 November. Knowler relinquished command in December 1747 to Captain Christopher Hill, who returned Bridgewater to Portsmouth for what was intended to be a small repair.
