= List of shipwrecks in 1761 =

The List of shipwrecks in 1761 includes some ships sunk, wrecked or otherwise lost during 1761.

table of contents
1761
Jan	Feb	Mar	Apr
May	Jun	Jul	Aug
Sep	Oct	Nov	Dec
Unknown date

== January ==
=== 1 January ===
List of shipwrecks: 1 January 1761
Ship	State	Description
HMS Duc D'Aquitaine	(Kingdom of Great Britain) Royal Navy	The third rate ship of the line foundered in a cyclone off Pondicherry, India, with the loss of all but nineteen of her 590 crew.
HMS Newcastle	(Kingdom of Great Britain) Royal Navy	The fourth rate ship of the line was driven ashore and wrecked in a cyclone at Pondicherry.
HMS Proctor	(Kingdom of Great Britain) Royal Navy	The fireship foundered in a cyclone off Pondicherry. Her crew were rescued.
HMS Queenborough	(Kingdom of Great Britain) Royal Navy	The sixth rate frigate foundered in a cyclone at Pondicherry. Her crew were rescued.
HMS Sunderland	(Kingdom of Great Britain) Royal Navy	The fourth rate ship of the line foundered in a cyclone off Pondicherry with the loss of 376 of her 393 crew.

=== 15 January ===
List of shipwrecks: 15 January 1761
Ship	State	Description
Susanna	Great Britain	The ship foundered. Her crew were rescued by HMS Minerva ( (Kingdom of Great Britain) Royal Navy). She was on a voyage from London to Lisbon, Portugal.

=== Unknown date ===
List of shipwrecks: Unknown date 1761
Ship	State	Description
Aurora	Great Britain	The ship was driven ashore in the Orkney Islands. She was on a voyage from Gothenburg, Sweden, to the Isle of Man. She was later refloated.
Barrington	Great Britain	The ship was holed and subsequently came ashore at New York, British America.
Brothers	Great Britain	The ship was wrecked on the Goodwin Sands, Kent. She was on a voyage from Great Yarmouth, Norfolk, to Lisbon, Portugal.
Diadem	Great Britain	The ship was captured by a privateer and was subsequently wrecked. She was on a voyage from Stockholm, Sweden, to Hull, Yorkshire.
Elizabeth & Mary	Great Britain	The ship was wrecked on Lindisfarne, Northumberland. She was on a voyage from Hamburg to Hull.
Félicité	French Navy	The fifth rate frigate was driven ashore on the Dutch coast by HMS Richmond ( (Kingdom of Great Britain) Royal Navy) with the loss of 100 of her 262 crew. She was then burnt.
Fly	Great Britain	The cutter was driven ashore east of Dover, Kent. Her crew were rescued. She was later refloated and taken in to Dover.
Goodhope	Great Britain	The ship was driven ashore and wrecked near Blyth, Northumberland. She was on a voyage from London to Dysart, Fife.
Griffin	Great Britain	The ship was lost in the Straits of Java. Her crew were rescued. She was on a voyage from China to London.
Happy Return	Great Britain	The ship was lost on the Dutch coast.
Katherine	Great Britain	The ship was wrecked on the Goodwin Sands. She was on a voyage from Great Yarmouth to Lisbon.
King of Prussia	Ireland	The brig was driven ashore at Feathard, County Wexford. Her crew survived. She was on a voyage from St Sebastians to the Isle of Man and Dublin.
Resolution	Great Britain	The ship was driven ashore and wrecked at Dunkerque, France, with the loss of all but one of her crew. The survivor was taken prisoner by the French. She was on a voyage from Great Yarmouth to Ancona, Papal States.
Three Friends	Great Britain	The ship was driven ashore and wrecked whilst on a voyage from Guadeloupe to Barbados.

== February ==
=== 12 February ===
List of shipwrecks: 12 February 1761
Ship	State	Description
Nathaniel	Great Britain	The ship was driven ashore at Bexhill-on-Sea, Sussex. She was on a voyage from Great Yarmouth, Norfolk, to Lisbon, Portugal.

=== Unknown date ===
List of shipwrecks: Unknown date 1761
Ship	State	Description
Coleby	Ireland	The ship was driven ashore.
Elgin Packet	Great Britain	The ship foundered in the North Sea off Coquet Island, Northumberland. She was on a voyage from Borrowstounness, Lothian, to London.
Santa Joseph	Spain	The ship ran aground in the Thames Estuary and was wrecked. She was on a voyage from Málaga to London.
Susanna & Cornelia	Dutch Republic	The ship was driven ashore.
Zee Post	Great Britain	The ship was driven ashore and wrecked at Dungeness, Kent, Great Britain. Her crew were rescued. She was on a voyage from Amsterdam to Bayonne, France.

== March ==
=== 1 March ===
List of shipwrecks: 1 March 1761
Ship	State	Description
Hope	Ireland	The ship was driven ashore at Beaumaris, Anglesey, Great Britain. She was on a voyage from Livorno, Grand Duchy of Tuscany, to Dublin.
Nancy	Great Britain	The full-rigged ship was driven ashore at Beaumaris.
St Peter	Great Britain	The ship was driven ashore at Beaumaris.

=== Unknown date ===
List of shipwrecks: Unknown date 1761
Ship	State	Description
Betty	Great Britain	The ship was lost near Whitehaven, Cumberland.
Northern Lass	Ireland	The ship sank at Dublin.
Tates	Spain	The ship foundered in the Yucatán Channeloff Casumal Island. Her crew were rescued.

== April ==
=== 11 April ===
List of shipwrecks: 11 April 1761
Ship	State	Description
Betty	Great Britain	The ship was lost near Cherbourg, Kingdom of France.

=== Unknown date ===
List of shipwrecks: Unknown date 1761
Ship	State	Description
Friendship	Great Britain	The ship was driven ashore and wrecked on Texel, Dutch Republic. She was on a voyage from Whitehaven, Cumberland, to Hamburg.
Neptune	Great Britain	The ship was driven ashore and wrecked at St Lucar, Spain. She was on a voyage from Cádiz, Spain, to Newfoundland, French America.
Neptune	Great Britain	The ship struck a rock in Plymouth Sound and was wrecked. Her crew were rescued. She was on a voyage from Livorno, Grand Duchy of Tuscany, to London.
Prince Frederick	Great Britain	The ship was driven ashore and wrecked near Vigo, Spain evading a French Man-of-War. Her crew were rescued. She was on a voyage from Falmouth, Cornwall, to Lisbon, Portugal.
Two Friends	Ireland	The polacca sank at Newry, County Antrim, after arriving from New York, British America.
Young Elizabeth	France	The ship was captured by a Royal Navy ship but was lost at Tariffa, Spain, with the loss of most of her crew.

== May ==
=== 4 May ===
List of shipwrecks: 4 May 1761
Ship	State	Description
Britannia	Great Britain	The ship sank in a hurricane near Charleston, South Carolina, British America.
Daniel	Great Britain	The ship sank in a hurricane near Charleston.
HMS Dolphin	(Kingdom of Great Britain) Royal Navy	The sixth rate frigate was severely damaged in a hurricane near Charleston.
Elizabeth	Great Britain	The ship was severely damaged in a hurricane near Charleston.
Eglinton	Great Britain	The ship was severely damaged in a hurricane near Charleston.
John	Great Britain	The ship was severely damaged in a hurricane near Charleston.
Manchester	Great Britain	The ship capsized in a hurricane near Charleston. She was later righted.
Polly & Betsey	Great Britain	The ship sank in a hurricane near Charleston.
Success	Great Britain	The ship sank in a hurricane near Charleston.
Thomas and Sarah	Great Britain	The ship was severely damaged in a hurricane near Charleston.

=== Unknown date ===
List of shipwrecks: Unknown date 1761
Ship	State	Description
Bacchus	Great Britain	The ship foundered in the Atlantic Ocean whilst on a voyage from Lisbon to Porto, Portugal. Her crew were rescued by Harriott (Great Britain).
Duke of Tuscany	Great Britain	The ship was attacked by the privateer Duc de Biron (France) in the Atlantic Ocean 100 leagues (300 nautical miles (560 km) west of Cape Clear Island, County Clare, Ireland. She was sunk by grenades with the loss of 216 of the 221 people on board. Duke of Tuscany was on a voyage from Bristol, Gloucestershire, to Newfoundland, French America.
Good Hope	Great Britain	The ship was wrecked in Dundrum Bay. She was on a voyage from Königsburg, Prussia, to Glasgow, Renfrewshire.
La Nostra Señora Finida & Santa Putro dal Cantara-Cafferia	Spain	The ship was lost near Lisbon, Portugal' She was on a voyage from Naples, Kingdom of Sicily, to London, Great Britain.
Mary-Ann	Great Britain	The ship was driven ashore and damaged in the Cattewater. She was on a voyage from Plymouth, Devon, to Bristol, Gloucestershire. She was later refloated.
Peggy	Great Britain	The ship foundered in the North Sea off Great Yarmouth, Norfolk. She was on a voyage from Banff, Aberdeenshire, to Rotterdam, Dutch Republic.
Ross	Great Britain	The ship was wrecked on the Spanish coast. She was on a voyage from Hull, Yorkshire, to Lisbon.
St Antonio de Lisboa	Portugal	The ship was driven ashore on the French coast. She was on a voyage from Lisbon to London.
Ulrick Augusta	Dutch Republic	The ship was driven ashore and wrecked at Penzance, Cornwall, Great Britain.

== June ==
=== 15 June ===
List of shipwrecks: 15 June 1761
Ship	State	Description
Thresher	Great Britain	The ship was captured by the privateer Bien Amie (France) and was scuttled. She was on a voyage from Cádiz, Spain, and the Isle of May to Maryland, British America.

=== Unknown date ===
List of shipwrecks: Unknown date 1761
Ship	State	Description
Jenter	Great Britain	The ship was lost on the Kentish Knock with the loss of all hands. She was on a voyage from North Carolina, British America, to Hull, Yorkshire.
Sally	Great Britain	The ship was driven ashore on The Shingles, Isle of Wight. She was on a voyage from London to Madeira and Antigua. She was subsequently taken in to Cowes, Isle of Wight.

== July ==
=== 1 July ===
List of shipwrecks: 1 July 1761
Ship	State	Description
Baltimore	Great Britain	The ship foundered in the Atlantic Ocean. Her crew were rescued by HMS Foudroyant ( (Kingdom of Great Britain) Royal Navy). She was on a voyage from Montserrat to London.

=== 29 July ===
List of shipwrecks: 29 July 1761
Ship	State	Description
Isabella	Great Britain	The ship was captured by Courageux (French Navy) whilst on a voyage from Campbeltown, Argyllshire, to Jamaica. She was plundered and burnt.

=== 31 July ===
List of shipwrecks: 31 July 1761
Ship	State	Description
Utile	French East India Company	With a crew of 142 at the time she departed Bayonne, France, the frigate was wrecked on the fringing reef of Tromelin Island in the Indian Ocean during a voyage from Madagascar to Mauritius with a cargo of approximately 160 Malagasy slaves. About 100 of the slaves drowned, but the crew and about 60 of the slaves reached shore. The ship Providence (flag unknown) rescued the 122 surviving French sailors on 27 September 1761, leaving the slaves behind. Only eight slaves remained alive when the corvette Dauphine (French Navy) rescued them on 29 November 1776.

=== Unknown date ===
List of shipwrecks: Unknown date 1761
Ship	State	Description
Edward & James	Great Britain	The ship foundered in the Atlantic Ocean 120 leagues west of Lands End, Cornwall. Her crew were rescued by a French privateer. She was on a voyage from Plymouth, Devon, to North Carolina, British America.
Sally	Great Britain	The ship ran aground in the River Ribble. She was on a voyage from Guadeloupe to Lancaster, Lancashire.

== August ==
=== Unknown date ===
List of shipwrecks: Unknown date 1761
Ship	State	Description
Concord	Great Britain	The ship foundered in the North Sea off Great Yarmouth, Norfolk.
Elizabeth	Great Britain	The ship foundered in the English Channel. She was on a voyage from Portland, Dorset, to Plymouth, Devon.
Peter & Stephen	Great Britain	The ship was lost on the Gunfleet Sand, in the North Sea off the coast of Essex. She was on a voyage from Rotterdam, Dutch Republic, to London.
Sybilla	Great Britain	The hired armed schooner was driven ashore and wrecked at Estepona, Spain, with the loss of five of her crew.

== September ==
=== 3 September ===
List of shipwrecks: 3 September 1761
Ship	State	Description
Prins Friedrich Adolph	(Sweden) Swedish East India Company	The East Indiaman was lost on the Shoals of Prata, in the South China Sea.
Ufrow Margaritta	Denmark	The ship was driven ashore and wrecked at Bantham, Devon, Great Britain. Her crew were rescued. She was on a voyage from Saint Thomas, Virgin Islands to Copenhagen.

=== Unknown date ===
List of shipwrecks: Unknown date 1761
Ship	State	Description
Maria Dorothea	Denmark	The ship was driven ashore at Selsey, Sussex, Kingdom of Great Britain. She was on a voyage from Saint Croix to Copenhagen.
Nelly	Great Britain	The ship was wrecked on the Goodwin Sands, Kent. She was on a voyage from Jamaica to London.
Wolf	Great Britain	The ship was driven ashore and wrecked in Douglas Bay, Isle of Man. She was on a voyage from Liverpool, Lancashire, to Africa.

== October ==
=== 2 October ===
List of shipwrecks: 2 October 1761
Ship	State	Description
Coffee & Pike	(Kingdom of Great Britain) British America	The schooner was wrecked in a hurricane at Jamaica.

=== 9 October ===
List of shipwrecks: 9 October 1761
Ship	State	Description
Four Sisters	Great Britain	The ship foundered in the North Sea. Her crew were rescued by Henrietta (Great Britain). She was on a voyage from Riga, Russia, to Berwick-upon-Tweed, Northumberland.

=== 10 October ===
List of shipwrecks: 10 October 1761
Ship	State	Description
Astrakhan (Астрахань)	Imperial Russian Navy	The ship of the line was driven ashore and wrecked at sv:Simpernäs, Tahkuna Peninsula, Hiiumaa. All on board were rescued. She was on a voyage from Kolberg to Kronstadt.
HMS Pheasant	(Kingdom of Great Britain) Royal Navy	The ship sloop foundered in the English Channel with the loss of all hands.

=== 27 October ===
List of shipwrecks: 27 October 1761
Ship	State	Description
HMS Griffin	(Kingdom of Great Britain) Royal Navy	The sixth rate frigate was wrecked off Barbuda with the loss of 50 of her crew.

=== Unknown date ===
List of shipwrecks: Unknown date 1761
Ship	State	Description
Adventure	Great Britain	The ship was lost near Wexford, Ireland. She was on a voyage from Chester, Cheshire, to Bristol, Gloucestershire.
Anne	Great Britain	The ship was driven ashore at Dublin, Ireland. She was on a voyage from Lancaster, Lancashire, to the West Indies.
August	Great Britain	The ship sank in the Humber. She was on a voyage from Saint Petersburg, Russia, to London.
Betsey	Great Britain	The ship foundered in the North Sea with the loss of all hands. She was on a voyage from London to Leith, Lothian.
Canada	Great Britain	The ship foundered in the Atlantic Ocean within a league (3 nautical miles (5.6 km) off Cádiz, Spain. She was on a voyage from Quebec, New France, to Cádiz.
Garland	Great Britain	The ship was driven ashore and wrecked near Ilfracombe, Devon. She was on a voyage from London to Bristol, Gloucestershire.
Habil	Sweden	The ship was lost on the Kentish Knock. She was on a voyage from Stockholm to London.
Hudson	Great Britain	The ship was driven ashore near Portland, Dorset.
Jupiter	Great Britain	The ship ran aground in the River Thames. She was on a voyage from London to the West Indies.
Lady Louisa	Great Britain	The ship foundered in the North Sea off the mouth of the Humber. Her crew were rescued. She was on a voyage from Königsburg, Prussia, to London.
Leith Packet	Great Britain	The ship foundered in the North Sea with the loss of five lives. She was on a voyage from London to Leith.
Lily	Great Britain	The ship was driven ashore and wrecked near Dundrum, County Tipperary, Ireland. She was on a voyage from Glasgow to Dublin.
Noble Betty	Great Britain	The ship was driven ashore and wrecked on Lindisfarne. She was on a voyage from Middlesbrough, Yorkshire, to the Firth of Forth.
Romaine	France	The privateer struck a rock in the North Sea 4 nautical miles (7.4 km) north of Dunkerque and was wrecked.
St Thomas	Great Britain	The ship was driven ashore at North Foreland, Kent. She was on a voyage from Trieste, Republic of Venice, to London.
Two Brothers	Great Britain	The ship sank at Dublin.

== November ==
=== 4 November ===
List of shipwrecks: 4 November 1761
Ship	State	Description
Adventure	Great Britain	The ship foundered in the Atlantic Ocean (38°30′N 51°38′W). Her crew were rescued. She was on a voyage from Virginia, British America, to London.

=== 14 November ===
List of shipwrecks: 14 November 1761
Ship	State	Description
Olive Branch	(Kingdom of Great Britain) British America	The snow was wrecked on the Egg Rock, off Boston, Massachusetts. Her thirteen crew were rescued.

=== 15 November ===
List of shipwrecks: 15 November 1761
Ship	State	Description
Auguste	Great Britain	The full-rigged ship was wrecked on Cape Breton Island, British America, with the loss of 114 of the 121 people on board. She was on a voyage from Montreal to a French port.
Mary	flag unknown	The ship was driven ashore and wrecked on the coast of Courland, Russian Empire.

=== 16 November ===
List of shipwrecks: 16 November 1761
Ship	State	Description
Halton	Great Britain	The galley foundered with the loss of all but one of her crew. She was on a voyage from London to Newfoundland, French America.

=== 26 November ===
List of shipwrecks: 26 November 1761
Ship	State	Description
Anna Naria	Great Britain	The ship foundered in the Grand Banks of Newfoundland. Her crew were rescued.
Hermione	French Navy	The frigate foundered off Vigo, Spain.

=== Unknown date ===
List of shipwrecks: Unknown date 1761
Ship	State	Description
Bance Island	Great Britain	The ship was captured by the privateer Diana (France) and was subsequently wrecked on the French coast. She was on a voyage from South Carolina, British America, to London.
Emanuel	Denmark	The ship sank at Dublin, Kingdom of Ireland. She was on a voyage from Cette, France, to the Isle of Man.
Grave van Booren	Dutch Republic	The ship foundered whilst on a voyage from Riga, Russia, to a Dutch port. Her crew were rescued.
Hawke	Great Britain	The ship was lost on the Welch Hook. Her crew were rescued. She was on a voyage from Guadeloupe to Bristol, Gloucestershire.
Hopewell	Great Britain	The ship was driven ashore near Dunstonborough Castle. She was on a voyage from Stockholm, Sweden, to Newcastle-upon-Tyne, Northumberland.
Quebec	Ireland	The ship was driven ashore and wrecked at Dublin. She was on a voyage from "Dronton" to Dublin.
Squirrel	Great Britain	The ship was lost near "Kinlaugh", Ireland. She was on a voyage from Cardigan to London.

== December ==
=== 16 December ===
List of shipwrecks: 16 December 1761
Ship	State	Description
Adventure	Great Britain	The ship was wrecked on the Goodwin Sands, Kent. Her crew were rescued. She was on a voyage from Boston to London.

=== 17 December ===
List of shipwrecks: 17 December 1761
Ship	State	Description
Gambia	Great Britain	The ship was lost in the Windward Passage. Her crew survived. She was on a voyage from Jamaica to London.

=== 28 December ===
List of shipwrecks: 28 December 1761
Ship	State	Description
Friendship	Great Britain	The ship was abandoned in the Atlantic Ocean. Her crew were rescued by Neptune (Great Britain). She was on a voyage from Jamaica to North Carolina, British America.

=== Unknown date ===
List of shipwrecks: Unknown date 1761
Ship	State	Description
Eagle	Great Britain	The ship foundered in the Baltic Sea. She was on a voyage from Rotterdam, Dutch Republic, to Saint Petersburg, Russia.
Elizabeth	Great Britain	The ship was lost near Cape St Vincent, Spain, after 111 December. her crew were rescued.
Hanover	Great Britain	The ship was lost at Figueira da Foz, Portugal.
King of Prussia	Ireland	The ship was lost near Wexford with the loss of five of her crew. She was on a voyage from Barbados to Belfast, County Antrim.
Nancy	Great Britain	The ship was lost off Cádiz, Spain.
North Star	Sweden	The ship was lost near "Masterland". She was on a voyage from London, Great Britain, to Stockholm.
Peggy	Great Britain	The ship was driven ashore and wrecked on Gotland, Sweden. She was on a voyage from Riga, Russia, to London.
True Briton	Great Britain	The ship foundered in the North Sea. Her crew survived. She was on a voyage from King's Lynn, Norfolk, to Hamburg.
Victory	Sweden	The ship was lost on a voyage from London to Stockholm.
Virgin	Great Britain	The ship was lost at St Sabastian's.
Vry	Dutch Republic	The ship was lost on the Dutch coast. She was on a voyage from London to Amsterdam.
Wandering Man	(Kingdom of Great Britain) Isle of Man	The ship was lost in the Orkney Islands, Great Britain. She was on a voyage from Gothenburg, Sweden, to Douglas.
Young Eagle	Great Britain	The ship was captured by the privateer Duc de Noailles (France) and was sunk by her.
Young John	Dutch Republic	The ship was lost off the Dutch coast.

== Unknown date ==
List of shipwrecks: Unknown date 1761
Ship	State	Description
Bella	Great Britain	The brig foundered in the Gulf of Florida. Her crew survived. She was on a voyage from Jamaica to Liverpool, Lancashire.
Black Prince	Great Britain	The ship was captured in the Black River, Jamaica, by a French privateer and burnt.
Blakeney	Ireland	The ship was driven ashore and wrecked on Barbados by a French privateer. Her crew were rescued. She was on a voyage from Belfast, County Antrim, to Barbados.
Boscawen	Great Britain	The ship was driven ashore and wrecked on Barbuda. She was on a voyage from Virginia, British America, to Barbados.
Charlotte	Great Britain	The Whaler foundered in the Atlantic Ocean off the coast of Newfoundland, French America.
City of Derry	Ireland	The ship sank in the Hudson River at New York, British America. She was on a voyage from Boston, Massachusetts, to New York.
Crawford	Great Britain	The ship was lost whilst on a voyage from Belle Isle, French America to the Basque Roads.
Eagle	Great Britain	The galley was wrecked on the Hogsty Reef. Her crew were rescued. She was on a voyage from Jamaica to London.
Eagle	Ireland	The ship foundered in the Baltic Sea. She was on a voyage from Saint Petersburg to Dublin.
Earl of Bute	Great Britain	The ship was destroyed by fire in the Baltic Sea. She was on a voyage from Saint Petersburg, Russia, to London.
Elizabeth & Ann	Great Britain	The ship sank at Charleston, South Carolina, British America, after running aground when leaving that port for Portsmouth, Hampshire.
Flora	Great Britain	The ship was captured and sunk off the coast of Africa by a French Man-of-War.
General Gage	Great Britain	The ship sank in the Saint Lawrence River. She was on a voyage from Quebec to London.
Happy Return	Great Britain	The ship foundered in the Atlantic Ocean. She was on a voyage from Virginia to London.
Isaac & William	Great Britain	The ship was driven ashore and wrecked on the Île d'Orléans, New France. She was on a voyage from Quebec, New France, to London.
Jamaica Packet	Great Britain	The ship was lost leaving Jamaica. She was bound for London.
Lemmon	Great Britain	The ship foundered whilst on a voyage from Newfoundland to Lisbon.
Mary	Great Britain	The ship foundered in the Gulf of Florida. Her crew survived. She was on a voyage from Jamaica to London.
Mary	Ireland	The ship was lost near Reval, Russia. She was on a voyage from Saint Petersburg to Dublin.
Minerva	Great Britain	The ship foundered in the Atlantic Ocean. Her crew survived. She was on a voyage from Porto, Portugal, to Quebec, New France.
Nancy	Great Britain	The ship strick an iceberg and foundered in the Atlantic Ocean. Her crew were rescued by Leopard (Great Britain). She was on a voyage from Glasgow, Renfrewshire, to Virginia.
Pallas	Great Britain	African slave trade: The ship was captured off the coast of Africa by a French Navy frigate and was blown up with the loss of over 600 lives.
Polly	(Kingdom of Great Britain) British America	The snow was wrecked on the coast of North Carolina before 10 December. She was on a voyage from Jamaica to Philadelphia, Pennsylvania.
Princess Anne	Ireland	The ship was driven ashore at Green Point, Nevis. She was on a voyage from Barbados to an Irish port.
Rapahanock	Great Britain	The ship foundered in the Atlantic Ocean. Her crew were rescued by Prince William (Great Britain). She was on a voyage from Virginia to London.
Recovery	Great Britain	African slave trade: The ship was lost on the coast of Africa. Her crew and 110 slaves were rescued.
Richard and William	Great Britain	The transport ship was sunk in an engagement with a privateer. She was on a voyage from Jamaica to London.
Russell	Great Britain	The ship sank off Virginia whilst leaving port for Barbados. Her crew were rescued.
Sally	Great Britain	The ship foundered in the Atlantic Ocean off the coast of British America. She was on a voyage from Philadelphia to Lisbon.
Scorpion	Great Britain	The ship was lost on The Jardines, off the coast of Cuba. She was on a voyage from Jamaica to Liverpool.
Seaford	Great Britain	The ship foundered in the Ligurian Sea off Livorno, Grand Duchy of Tuscany, with the loss of a crew member.
Shark	Great Britain	African slave trade: The ship was lost at Bonny. Most of the slave were rescued. She was on a bound for British America.
Success	Great Britain	The ship was wrecked off Quebec. Her crew were rescued.
Young Bever	Great Britain	The ship was lost on the coast of Newfoundland, French America. She was on a voyage from Newfoundland to Cádiz, Spain.
