= List of shipwrecks in 1762 =

The List of shipwrecks in 1762 includes some ships sunk, wrecked or otherwise lost during 1762.

table of contents
← 1761 / 1762 / 1763 →
Jan	Feb	Mar	Apr
May	Jun	Jul	Aug
Sep	Oct	Nov	Dec
Unknown date

== January ==
=== 3 January ===
List of shipwrecks: 3 January 1762
Ship	State	Description
HMS Biddiford	(Kingdom of Great Britain) Royal Navy	The sixth rate foundered in the North Sea off Great Yarmouth, Norfolk with some loss of life.

=== 8 January ===
List of shipwrecks: 8 January 1762
Ship	State	Description
Dragon	Great Britain	The ship was wrecked in the River Thames at Rotherhithe, Surrey. She was on a voyage from London to Barbados.
Greyhound	Great Britain	The ship was driven ashore and wrecked on the coast of Barbados by a French privateer. She was on a voyage from London to Barbados.

=== 12 January ===
List of shipwrecks: 12 January 1762
Ship	State	Description
Charlotte	Great Britain	The ship was driven ashore and wrecked in the Cattewater.
Good Intent	Great Britain	The tender was driven ashore and wrecked in the Cattewater.
Granville	Great Britain	The ship was driven ashore and wrecked in the Cattewater. She was on a voyage from London to Dublin, Ireland.
John & Sukey	Great Britain	The ship was driven ashore and wrecked in the Cattewater. She was on a voyage from London to Cork, Ireland and the West Indies.
Nossa Senhora de Padrão da Serra	Portugal	The ship was driven ashore and wrecked in the Cattewater. She was on a voyage from London to Lisbon.
Prussian Hero	Great Britain	The victualling ship was driven ashore and wrecked in the Cattewater.
Seanymph	Great Britain	The ship was driven ashore and wrecked in the Cattewater.
Zénobie	French Navy	The frigate was driven ashore and wrecked at Portland, Dorset, Great Britain with the loss of 40 of her 110 crew.

=== Unknown date ===
List of shipwrecks: Unknown date 1762
Ship	State	Description
Amiable	France	The privateer was lost with the loss of 27 lives.
Delight	Ireland	The ship was lost near Wexford. She was on a voyage from Bordeaux, France to Dublin.
Helen	Great Britain	The ship was lost off Cape Sambro, Nova Scotia, French America. She was on a voyage from Bristol, Gloucestershire to Halifax, Nova Scotia.
Pearl	Ireland	The ship was driven ashore and wrecked on the North Bull Sandbank, in the Irish Sea off Dublin. She was on a voyage from Dublin to Genoa and Livorno, Grand Duchy of Tuscany.
Sarah & Katherine	Great Britain	The ship was driven ashore on the Isle of Man. she was on a voyage from Philadelphia, Pennsylvania, British America to Bristol, Gloucestershire.
Three Friends	Great Britain	The brig was driven ashore and wrecked near Wexford with the loss of one of the thirteen people on board. She was on a voyage from Senegal to London.

== February ==
=== 10 February ===
List of shipwrecks: 10 February 1762
Ship	State	Description
Sally	Great Britain	The ship was driven ashore in the Elbe near Glückstadt, Duchy of Holstein.

=== 21 February ===
List of shipwrecks: 21 February 1762
Ship	State	Description
Cumgilly	Great Britain	The ship was driven ashore and wrecked near Appledore, Devon. She was on a voyage from Plymouth, Devon to Carmarthen.
Edinburgh	Great Britain	The ship was driven ashore and wrecked near Leith, Lothian. She was on a voyage from London to Leith.

=== 22 February ===
List of shipwrecks: 22 February 1762
Ship	State	Description
Retrelle	France	The ship, which had been captured by HMS Bellona ( (Kingdom of Great Britain) Royal Navy) on 17 February, was driven ashore and wrecked on the Île de Batz with the loss of five of her crew. Survivors were taken prisoner by the French.

=== 24 February ===
List of shipwrecks: 24 February 1762
Ship	State	Description
Ann	Great Britain	The ship foundered in the North Sea off Great Yarmouth, Norfolk with the loss of four of her crew. She was on a voyage from North Bergen, Norway to Sunderland, County Durham.

=== Unknown date ===
List of shipwrecks: Unknown date 1762
Ship	State	Description
Barnard	Great Britain	The ship was captured in the Atlantic Ocean (48°N 26°W) on 10 February by the privateer Diana (France) whilst on a voyage from Cape Fear, North Carolina, British America to London. She was sent in to Bayonne, France but was lost off that port.
Lady Katharina	Great Britain	The ship was driven ashore and wrecked on Terschelling, Dutch Republic. She was on a voyage from London to Amsterdam, Dutch Republic.
Success	Great Britain	The ship foundered in the North Sea between Fraserburgh and Peterhead, Aberdeenshire.
Syren	Great Britain	The ship was wrecked on the Dutch coast with the loss of all hands. She was on a voyage from Eyemouth, Berwickshire to Veere or Rotterdam, Dutch Republic.
William	Great Britain	The ship was driven ashore near Cuxhaven, Electorate of Hanover. She was on a voyage from Hamburg to London.

== March ==
=== 15 March ===
List of shipwrecks: 15 March 1762
Ship	State	Description
Charming Betsey	Great Britain	The ship was sunk at Dublin, Ireland. She was on a voyage from Porto, Portugal to Dublin and Liverpool, Lancashire.

=== 18 March ===
List of shipwrecks: 18 March 1762
Ship	State	Description
Nostra Señora de Piedade	Spain	The ship was wrecked on the North Bull Sandbank, in the Irish Sea off Dublin, Ireland. She was on a voyage from St Georges to London.

=== 22 March ===
List of shipwrecks: 22 March 1762
Ship	State	Description
Andreas	Sweden	The ship was wrecked on the Goodwin Sands, Kent, Great Britain. Her crew were rescued. She was on a voyage from Saint Martins to Warberg.

=== Unknown date ===
List of shipwrecks: Unknown date 1762
Ship	State	Description
Catherina Margaretta	Sweden	The ship was driven ashore on Lindisfarne, Northumberland, Great Britain. She was on a voyage from Gothenburg to Peterhead, Aberdeenshire, Great Britain.
Duke of York	Great Britain	The ship was wrecked on the Herd Sand, in the North Sea off Tynemouth. She was on a voyage from London to North Shields.
Jeun Sultan	France	The privateer was captured by Scipio (Great Britain). She was later driven ashore and wrecked on the coast of Sussex, Great Britain, with the loss of a crew member.
Laurel	Great Britain	The transport ship was sunk by a collision with Houghton ( British East India Company) in the English Channel 5 leagues (24 km) west of Portland Bill, Dorset.
Margaret	Great Britain	The ship was wrecked on the coast of Norfolk with the loss of two of her crew. She was on a voyage from Sunderland, County Durham to Aberdeen.
Mercury	Great Britain	The ship was lost off Youghall, County Cork, Ireland, with the loss of two of her crew. She was on a voyage from Jamaica to Bristol.
Mohawke	Great Britain	The ship was driven ashore in the Tagus. She was on a voyage from London to Lisbon, Portugal.
Nostra Señora del Rosario	Spain	The ship foundered in the English Channel off Guernsey, Channel Islands. She was on a voyage from Guernsey to Bilbao.
Santissima Trinita & St. Pedro D'Alantara	Spain	The ship was driven ashore and wrecked at Exeter, Devon, Great Britain. She was on a voyage from Exeter to Naples, Kingdom of Sicily.

== April ==
=== 6 April ===
List of shipwrecks: 6 April 1762
Ship	State	Description
Phaeton	flag unknown	The ship foundered in the Atlantic Ocean off the coast of North Carolina, British America.

=== Unknown date ===
List of shipwrecks: Unknown date 1762
Ship	State	Description
Bacchus	Great Britain	The ship was wrecked on the Posset Point Rocks, in the Bristol Channel.
Elizabeth	Great Britain	The ship was lost on the Long Sand, in the North Sea off the coast of Essex. She was on a voyage from a Dutch port to Guinea.
Industry	Great Britain	The ship was lost off the mouth of the Elbe. She was on a voyage from King's Lynn, Norfolk to Bremen.
Young Adrian	Ireland	The ship was lost near Portaferry, County Down. She was on a voyage from Bordeaux, France to Dublin.

== May ==
=== 7 May ===
List of shipwrecks: 7 May 1762
Ship	State	Description
Achilles	Great Britain	The ship caught fire off Carthagena, Spain and was beached. Her crew survived. She was on a voyage from Naples, Kingdom of Sicily and Livorno, Grand Duchy of Tuscany to London.

=== 22 May ===
List of shipwrecks: 22 May 1762
Ship	State	Description
Buffoon	Great Britain	The frigate was lost in the Hamoaze.

=== Unknown date ===
List of shipwrecks: Unknown date 1762
Ship	State	Description
Jane	Great Britain	The ship was captured by the privateer Revenge (France). She was later driven ashore on the Dutch coast by a British armed cutter.
Revenge	France	The privateer was driven ashore on the Dutch coast by a British armed cutter and was then burnt.

== June ==
=== 21 June ===
List of shipwrecks: 21 June 1762
Ship	State	Description
Lytchett	Great Britain	The ship was captured in the Grand Banks of Newfoundland by Greyhound (French Navy) and was burnt.

== July ==
=== Unknown date ===
List of shipwrecks: Unknown date 1762
Ship	State	Description
Hercules	Great Britain	The ship was driven ashore near Riga, Russia. She was on a voyage from London to Riga.
Middleton	Great Britain	The ship was driven ashore at Liverpool, Lancashire. She was on a voyage from the Leeward Islands to Liverpool.
Molly	Great Britain	The ship was driven ashore and wrecked in the Weser. She was on a voyage from Wisbech, Cambridgeshire to Bremen.
St. João Baptista	Portugal	The ship foundered in the Atlantic Ocean. Her crew were rescued by HMS Postillion ( (Kingdom of Great Britain) Royal Navy). She was on a voyage from Porto to Guernsey, Channel Islands.
Success	Great Britain	The ship struck a rock and foundered off the coast of Norway. She was on a voyage from Bergen to Portsoy, Aberdeenshire.
Unity	Great Britain	The ship was lost in the Weser. She was on a voyage from Hull, Yorkshire to Bremen.

== August ==
=== 12 August ===
List of shipwrecks: 12 August 1762
Ship	State	Description
Asia	Spanish Navy	Battle of Havana: The ship of the line was scuttled at Havana, Captaincy General of Cuba.
Europa	Spanish Navy	Battle of Havana: The ship-of-the-line was scuttled at Havana .
Neptuno	Spanish Navy	Battle of Havana: The ship-of-the-line was scuttled at Havana.

=== 15 August ===
List of shipwrecks: 15 August 1762
Ship	State	Description
Savage	France	The ship privateer, a cutter, was captured and sunk by HMS Hazard ( (Kingdom of Great Britain) Royal Navy).

=== 26 August ===
List of shipwrecks: 26 August 1762
Ship	State	Description
Indian Prince	Great Britain	The ship was captured off Madeira by a French Navy frigate, reported to be the Modeste, and was burnt. Her crew were put aboard the Greyhound (Great Britain), which was also captured but was released with her rigging partly disabled. Indian Prince was on a voyage from Bristol, Gloucestershire to Africa.

=== 27 August ===
List of shipwrecks: 27 August 1762
Ship	State	Description
Rose	Great Britain	The ship parted from a convoy on this date. No further trace, presumed foundered with the loss of all hands. She was on a voyage from Jamaica to London.

=== 31 August ===
List of shipwrecks: 31 August 1762
Ship	State	Description
Prince of Wales	Great Britain	The ship foundered in the Atlantic Ocean 15 leagues (72 km) west of Belle Île, France. Her crew were rescued by a Dutch vessel.

=== Unknown date ===
List of shipwrecks: Unknown date 1762
Ship	State	Description
Diligence	Great Britain	The ship sprang a leak and foundered in the North Sea. Her crew were rescued by a Dutch ship. She was on a voyage from Saint Petersburg, Russia to London.
Gibraltar	Great Britain	The ship was run down and sunk by another vessel. Her crew were rescued.
Judith Maria	Great Britain	The ship was driven ashore and wrecked on Bermuda. Her crew were rescued. She was on a voyage from Jamaica to London.

== September ==
=== 3 September ===
List of shipwrecks: 3 September 1762
Ship	State	Description
Jufro Francina	Dutch Republic	The ship was driven ashore and wrecked 5 nautical miles (9.3 km) east of Plymouth, Devon, Great Britain. She was on a voyage from Lisbon, Portugal to Amsterdam.

=== 14 September ===
List of shipwrecks: 14 September 1762
Ship	State	Description
HMS Stirling Castle	(Kingdom of Great Britain) Royal Navy	The second-rate ship of the line was scuttled at Havana, Cuba.

=== 15 September ===
List of shipwrecks: 15 September 1762
Ship	State	Description
Santa Joseph de Goyesechea	Spain	The ship was driven ashore in Avilés Bay by HMS Aeolus ( (Kingdom of Great Britain) Royal Navy) and was burnt. She was on a voyage from Caracas, Viceroyalty of Peru to "Port Passage".

=== 18 September ===
List of shipwrecks: 18 September 1762
Ship	State	Description
HMS Humber	(Kingdom of Great Britain) Royal Navy	The fifth rate was wrecked on the Haisborough Sands, in the North Sea off the coast of Norfolk.
St Paul	Great Britain	The ship was wrecked on the Haisborough Sands.

=== 19 September ===
List of shipwrecks: 19 September 1762
Ship	State	Description
Christian	Danzig	The dogger was driven ashore and wrecked in Liverpool Bay.
Greyhound	Great Britain	The ship was driven ashore in the River Ribble and wrecked. She was on a voyage from Liverpool, Lancashire to Dublin, Ireland.

=== 24 September ===
List of shipwrecks: 24 September 1762
Ship	State	Description
HMS Badger	(Kingdom of Great Britain) Royal Navy	The Merlin-class sloop was wrecked in the Orkney Islands with the loss of all hands.

=== Unknown date ===
List of shipwrecks: Unknown date 1762
Ship	State	Description
Eagle	Great Britain	The ship was abandoned in the Irish Sea off Lancaster, Lancashire, her crew wishing to avoid impressment. She came ashore and was wrecked. Eagle was on a voyage from Guadeloupe to Lancaster.
Fenwick	Great Britain	The ship was driven ashore and wrecked on Heligoland. She was on a voyage from Newcastle upon Tyne, Northumberland to Hamburg.
Jennet	Great Britain	The ship was lost near Narva, Russia. She was on a voyage from Narva to Lancaster, Lancashire.
Kingstone	Great Britain	The ship was driven ashore on the coast of the Baltic Sea and wrecked. She was on a voyage from Saint Petersburg, Russia to London.
Mercury	Great Britain	The ship was wrecked on Selsey Island, Sussex. She was on a voyage from Jamaica to London.
Peggy	Great Britain	The ship was driven ashore and wrecked on Heligoland. She was on a voyage from Newcastle upon Tyne to Hamburg.
Prince of Wales	Great Britain	The ship was driven ashore at Highlakes, Cheshire. She was on a voyage from Jamaica to Liverpool, Lancashire.

== October ==
=== 3 October ===
List of shipwrecks: 3 October 1762
Ship	State	Description
Emelia	Great Britain	The ship was driven ashore at Backton, Norfolk.
Hopestill	Great Britain	The ship was driven ashore and wrecked at Great Yarmouth, Norfolk.
Industry	Great Britain	The ship was driven ashore at Winterton-on-Sea, Norfolk with the loss of a crew member.
John and Mary	Great Britain	The ship was driven ashore at Backton.
John and Thomas	Great Britain	The ship was driven ashore at Winterton-on-Sea. Her crew were rescued. She was on a voyage from Schiedam, Dutch Republic to Sunderland, County Durham.
Lively Nanny	Great Britain	The ship was driven ashore at Backton. Her crew were rescued.
Providence	Great Britain	The ship was driven ashore at Backton. Her crew were rescued. She was on a voyage from "Cammas" to London.
Sarah	Great Britain	The ship was driven ashore at Lowestoft, Suffolk. Her crew were rescued.
St George	Great Britain	The ship was driven ashore at Mundesley, Norfolk.
Unity	Great Britain	The ship was driven ashore at Winterton-on-Sea. Her crew were rescued.

=== 25 October ===
List of shipwrecks: 25 October 1762
Ship	State	Description
Arthur	(Kingdom of Great Britain) Guernsey	The ship foundered in the English Channel off Guernsey. She was on a voyage from Guernsey to Martinique and Havana, Captaincy General of Cuba.
Providence	Great Britain	The transport ship was lost at Havana.

=== 26 October ===
List of shipwrecks: 26 October 1762
Ship	State	Description
Charming Isabella	Great Britain	The ship was driven ashore near Wells-next-the-Sea, Norfolk. Her crew were rescued.
Experiment	Great Britain	The ship was driven ashore near Wells-next-the-Sea with the loss of two of her crew.
James and Mary	Great Britain	The ship was driven ashore near Wells-next-the-Sea. Her crew were rescued.
John and Elizabeth	Great Britain	The ship was driven ashore near Wells-next-the-Sea. Her crew were rescued.

=== 30 October ===
List of shipwrecks: 30 October 1762
Ship	State	Description
Phœnix	Great Britain	African slave trade: The ship foundered in the Atlantic Ocean with the loss of at least 332 lives. Thirty-six crew were rescued by King George (Great Britain). She was on a voyage from Africa to Virginia, British America.

=== Unknown date ===
List of shipwrecks: Unknown date 1762
Ship	State	Description
Anne & Margaret	Great Britain	The ship was driven ashore at Great Yarmouth, Norfolk. She was on a voyage from Königsberg, Prussia to Hull, Yorkshire.
Bona Fortuna	(Denmark) Norway	The ship was driven ashore at Blakeney, Norfolk with the loss of all but one of her crew. She was on a voyage from North Bergen to London.
Charming Nelly	Great Britain	The ship was driven ashore and wrecked at Eccles-on-Sea, Norfolk. She was on a voyage from Saint Petersburg, Russia to Southampton, Hampshire.
Charming Sally	Great Britain	The ship foundered in the Atlantic Ocean. Her crew were rescued. She was on a voyage from London to Gibraltar.
Endeavour	Great Britain	The ship was driven ashore north of Lowestoft, Suffolk. She was on a voyage from Wells-next-the-Sea, Norfolk to Schiedam, Dutch Republic.
Grandburg	Great Britain	The ship foundered in the Irish Sea off Strangford Lough in mid-October. She was on a voyage from Liverpool, Lancashire to Bristol, Gloucestershire.
Haston	Great Britain	The ship was driven ashore in the Hamoaze.
Industry	Great Britain	The ship was driven ashore at Great Yarmouth, Norfolk. She was on a voyage from Saint Petersburg, Russia to London.
London	Great Britain	The ship ran aground and was damaged at Saint Kitts. She was on a voyage from London to the Leeward Islands via Madeira and Gibraltar.
Louisa	Sweden	The ship was driven ashore at Corton, Suffolk. Her crew were rescued. She was on a voyage from London to Newcastle upon Tyne, Northumberland.
Minerve	French Navy	The frigate was lost at Vila Franca do Campo, Azores with the loss of most of her crew.
Molly	Great Britain	The ship foundered in the Bristol Channel off Watchet, Somerset.
Pro Patria	Sweden	The ship foundered in the North Sea 14 nautical miles (26 km) north of Great Yarmouth. Her crew survived. She was on a voyage from Lisbon, Portugal to Åbo.
Richard and Ann	Great Britain	The ship was driven ashore at Blakeney. She was on a voyage from Burlington, New Jersey, British America to London.
Scott	Great Britain	The ship was driven ashore at Plymouth, Devon. She was on a voyage from Grenada to London.
"Three Good Friends"	Dutch Republic	The ship was destroyed by fire at Dublin, Ireland.
Two Brothers	Great Britain	The ship struck a rock and was severely damaged whilst on a voyage from Liverpool to Dublin, Ireland.
Tyger	Great Britain	The ship was driven ashore and wrecked at Plymouth, Devon. She was on a voyage from Jamaica to London.

== November ==
=== 11 November ===
List of shipwrecks: 11 November 1762
Ship	State	Description
Ferdinand	Great Britain	The ship foundered in The Downs with the loss of thirteen of her eighteen crew. She was on a voyage from London to Lisbon, Portugal.
Friends Goodwill	Great Britain	The ship foundered in The Swin. Her crew were rescued. She was on a voyage from Newcastle upon Tyne, Northumberland to London.
Hawke	Great Britain	The ship was driven ashore and wrecked at Deal, Kent. Her crew were rescued. She was on a voyage from Newcastle upon Tyne to Pool, Dorset.
Queen of Portugal	Great Britain	The ship was driven ashore and wrecked at Deal with the loss of a crew member. She was on a voyage from London to Senegal.

=== 15 November ===
List of shipwrecks: 15 November 1762
Ship	State	Description
Pocock	Great Britain	The ship foundered in the Atlantic Ocean. Her crew were rescued by the snow Joanna. She was n a voyage from New Providence, Rhode Island to Philadelphia, Pennsylvania, British America.

=== 27 November ===
List of shipwrecks: 27 November 1762
Ship	State	Description
Minerva	Sweden	The ship was driven ashore betweenCalais and Boulogne, Kingdom of France. Her crew were rescued. She was on a voyage from Stockholm to Bristol, Gloucestershire, Great Britain.

=== 29 November ===
List of shipwrecks: 29 November 1762
Ship	State	Description
HMS Marlborough	(Kingdom of Great Britain) Royal Navy	The second rate ship of the line sprang a leak and was abandoned in the Atlantic Ocean. Her crew were rescued by HMS Antelope ( (Kingdom of Great Britain) Royal Navy).

=== Unknown date ===
List of shipwrecks: Unknown date 1762
Ship	State	Description
Adventure	Great Britain	The ship was driven ashore on the coast of Norfolk. She was on a voyage from London to Hull, Yorkshire.
Ann and Francis	Great Britain	The ship was driven ashore and wrecked near Lowestoft, Suffolk. Her crew were rescued. She was on a voyage from Wells-next-the-Sea, Norfolk to Rotterdam, Dutch Republic.
Anne	Great Britain	The ship was driven ashore and wrecked on the coast of Norfolk with the loss of four lives.
	(Kingdom of Great Britain) Royal Navy	The sloop-of-war was driven ashore in Tor Bay. Her crew were rescued.
Charles	flag unknown	The ship was wrecked on the coast of Portugal. She was on a voyage from a Baltic port to Figueira, Portugal.
Duke of Cumberland	Great Britain	The ship was driven ashore and wrecked at Castlehaven, County Cork, Ireland. She was on a voyage from Jamaica to Liverpool, Lancashire.
Duke of York	Great Britain	The ship was lost at Fishguard, Pembrokeshire. She was on a voyage from Chester, Cheshire to London.
Elizabeth	Great Britain	The ship was driven ashore near Wells-next-the-Sea. She was on a voyage from Hull to London.
Endeavoua	Great Britain	The ship was driven ashore at Crosby, Lancashire. She was on a voyage from Cork, Ireland to Liverpool.
Finder	Dutch Republic	The ship was driven ashore and wrecked on Gorey. She was on a voyage from Angola to Rotterdam.
Friendship	Great Britain	The brig foundered. Her crew were rescued. She was on a voyage from London to New York, British America.
Greyhound	Great Britain	The ship was driven ashore and wrecked on the coast of Lincolnshire. She was on a voyage from Newcastle upon Tyne, Northumberland to Pool, Dorset.
Hopewell	Great Britain	The ship was driven ashore on the coast of Norfolk. She was on a voyage from King's Lynn, Norfolk to London.
Mayflower	Great Britain	The ship was wrecked on the Long Oversall Sand, in the North Sea off the north coast of Norfolk. The only survivor was her captain, who was rescued by a coble from Wells-next-the-Sea.
Pennington	Great Britain	The ship was driven ashore on the coast of Norfolk.
Quince Tree	(Kingdom of Great Britain) British America	The brigantine sprang a leak and foundered in the Atlantic Ocean south of Cape Hatteras, North Carolina before 11 November. All seventeen people on board survived. She was on a voyage from Philadelphia, Pennsylvania to Cape Fear, North Carolina.
Samuel and Joseph	Great Britain	The ship was lost on the coast of Ireland. She was on a voyage from Rhode Island, British America to Amsterdam, Dutch Republic.
Samuel & Lydia	Great Britain	The ship was driven ashore on the coast of Norfolk. She was on a voyage from "Blythnock" to London.
Sarah	Hamburg	The galley foundered in the North Sea. She was on a voyage from Hamburg to London.
St George	Great Britain	The ship was lost off "Pilasouthery". She was on a voyage from Faro, Portugal to Lancaster, Lancashire.
Tarleton	Great Britain	The ship was driven ashore at Crookhaven, County Cork. She was on a voyage from Jamaica to Liverpool.
True Briton	Great Britain	The ship foundered in the North Sea off Hartlepool, County Durham with the loss of all hands.

== December ==
=== 12 December ===
List of shipwrecks: 12 December 1762
Ship	State	Description
HMS Temple	(Kingdom of Great Britain) Royal Navy	The third-rate ship-of-the-line foundered in the Atlantic Ocean off Cape Clear Island, County Cork, Ireland.

=== 15 December ===
List of shipwrecks: 15 December 1762
Ship	State	Description
Arnold	Great Britain	The ship was lost on the Maitanzes. She was on a voyage from Jamaica to Havana Captaincy General of Cuba.

=== 18 December ===
List of shipwrecks: 18 December 1762
Ship	State	Description
Pretty	(Kingdom of Great Britain) Guernsey	The sloop departed from Saint-Malo for Guernsey. No further trace, presumed foundered in the English Channel with the loss of all hands.

=== Unknown date ===
List of shipwrecks: Unknown date 1762
Ship	State	Description
Ann	Great Britain	The ship was driven ashore and wrecked on the Isle of Lewis. Her crew were rescued. She was on a voyage from Virginia, British America to Glasgow, Renfrewshire.
Anna Maria	Great Britain	The ship was destroyed by fire in the River Ribble. She was on a voyage from Königsberg, Prussia to Lancaster, Lancashire.
Bien Amie	Spain	The ship was wrecked on the Spaniard Sand, in the Thames Estuary off Whitstable, Kent, Great Britain. She was on a voyage from London to Havana, Captaincy General of Cuba.
Commerce	Great Britain	The ship was driven ashore and wrecked at Great Yarmouth, Norfolk. She was on a voyage from Riga, Russia to London.
Isabella	Great Britain	The ship sank on The Gallions. She was on a voyage from London to Madeira and Jamaica. She was later refloated and taken in to the River Thames.
Royal Charlotte	Great Britain	The ship sprang a leak whilst on a voyage from Quebec, New France to London. She was beached in the River Corrib, Ireland.
HMS Temple	(Kingdom of Great Britain) Royal Navy	The third-rate ship of the line foundered in the Atlantic Ocean.
Two Brothers	Great Britain	The ship ran aground off Bembridge, Isle of Wight. She was on a voyage from Guernsey, Channel Islands to London.

== Unknown date ==
List of shipwrecks: Unknown date 1762
Ship	State	Description
Adventure	Great Britain	The transport ship foundered in the Atlantic Ocean. Her crew were rescued by HMS Culloden ( (Kingdom of Great Britain) Royal Navy. She was on a voyage from Havana, Captaincy General of Cuba to Plymouth, Devon.
Adventure	(Kingdom of Great Britain) Guernsey	The ship foundered in the Atlantic Ocean. She was on a voyage from Guadeloupe to London.
Betsey	Great Britain	The ship was wrecked on Sandy Island. She was on a voyage from Guadeloupe to Antigua.
Blessing	Great Britain	The ship foundered in the Gulf of Finland. She was on a voyage from Saint Petersburg, Russia to London.
Brilliant	Great Britain	The ship foundered in the Atlantic Ocean off Martinique. Her crew were rescued. She was on a voyage from London to the West Indies.
Britannia	Great Britain	The ship bulged whilst being heaved at Quebec, New France. She was declared a total loss.
Brotherhood	Great Britain	The transport ship foundered. Her crew were rescued.
Cesar	Great Britain	The transport ship foundered in the Atlantic Ocean. Her crew were rescued. She was on a voyage from Havana to New York, British America.
Cato	Great Britain	The ship was lost in the Bahamas. Her crew were rescued. She was on a voyage from Cork, Ireland to Guadeloupe.
Charming Nancy	Great Britain	The ship sank near Halifax, Nova Scotia, French America. She was on a voyage from London to Halifax.
Charming Sally	Great Britain	The ship capsized with the loss of all hands. She was on a voyage from Virginia, British America to London.
Defiance	Great Britain	The ship was lost at New Calabar.
General Amherst	Great Britain	The ship foundered in the Atlantic Ocean. Her crew were rescued. She was on a voyage from Guadeloupe to London.
General Wolfe	Great Britain	The transport ship was wrecked on the Morro Rocks, Havana.
Happy Return	Great Britain	The ship was lost in the Bahamas. Her crew were rescued. She was on a voyage from Monte Christi, San Domingo to New York.
Industry	Great Britain	The ship was wrecked on the coast of New England, British America. She was on a voyage from Gibraltar to Boston, Massachusetts, British America.
Intrepide	Great Britain	The ship was sunk off the coast of Africa in an engagement with a French privateer. There were four survivors.
Lark	Ireland	The ship was driven ashore and wrecked in the Bay of Bulls whilst evading a French Navy man-of-war.
Lark	Great Britain	The transport ship was wrecked on the Morro Rocks, Havana.
Lion	Great Britain	The transport ship was wrecked on the Morro Rocks, Havana. Her crew were rescued.
Mary	Great Britain	The ship was lost near Boston, Massachusetts. She was on a voyage from Halifax to Gibraltar.
Oldbury	Great Britain	African slave trade: The ship was destroyed by explosives at Bonny, Nigeria. Her crew were rescued.
Peggy	(Kingdom of Great Britain)	The brig foundered in the Gulf of Florida. She was on a voyage from Jamaica to London.
Phæton	Great Britain	The ship foundered in the Atlantic Ocean 40 leagues (190 km) off the Virginia Capes, British America. Her crew survived. She was on a voyage from the Canary Islands to Philadelphia, Pennsylvania, British America.
Pitt	Great Britain	The transport ship, a galley, foundered.
Pretty Betsey	Great Britain	The transport ship foundered. Her crew were rescued.
Prince George	Great Britain	The ship was lost at Martha Bacca, Jamaica at the end of a voyage from London. Her crew were rescued.
Prince Ferdinand	Great Britain	The ship was lost at Jamaica. She was on a voyage from London to Jamaica.
Providence	Great Britain	The ship foundered in the Atlantic Ocean. She was on a voyage from South Carolina, to Providence, Rhode Island, British America.
Recovery	Great Britain	The ship foundered in the Atlantic Ocean. Her crew were rescued. She was on a voyage from Virginia to London.
Richard	Great Britain	The transport ship foundered. Her crew were rescued.
Royal Duke	Great Britain	The ship foundered in the Atlantic Ocean. Her crew were rescued by HMS Intrepid ( (Kingdom of Great Britain) Royal Navy).
Sally	Great Britain	The ship was captured by four French Navy Men-of-War and burnt. She was on a voyage from London to New York.
St Joseph	Kingdom of Sicily	The ship was driven ashore and wrecked on the Barbary Coast with the loss of her captain. She was on a voyage from Trani to Lisbon, Portugal.
Streckland Castle	Great Britain	The transport ship foundered.
Sv. Pëtr I Pavel	Russian Empire	The vessel was wrecked off Shemya in the Near Islands in the western Catherine Archipelago. Most of her crew survived.
Tortola	Great Britain	The ship capsized off Tortola. Her crew survived. She was on a voyage from Tortola to London.
Unidentified	Unidentified	Russian explorers reported a two-masted foreign vessel abandoned in the Catherine Archipelago. Inhabitants of Unalaska Island and Umnak Island reported it to be on Chikhmil Island.
Victoria	Great Britain	The ship foundered in the Tyrrhenian Sea off Naples, Kingdom of Sicily. Her crew were rescued. She was on a voyage from Liverpool to Naples.
William and Ann	Great Britain	The transport ship foundered. Her crew were rescued.
