= Hopestill =

Hopestill may refer to:

- Hopestill Cheswell, African-American builder of the John Paul Jones House, Portsmouth, New Hampshire, in 1758, originally built for Captain Gregory Purcell
- Hopestill Pillow (1857–1895), English Baptist missionary to India
- USS Hopestill (SP-191), a US Navy patrol vessel in commission from 1917 to 1919
- Hopestill, a British vessel which was shipwrecked at Great Yarmouth, Norfolk, on 3 October 1762 - see List of shipwrecks in 1762
