= List of shipwrecks in 1763 =

The List of shipwrecks in 1763 includes some ships sunk, wrecked or otherwise lost during 1763.

table of contents
1763
Jan	Feb	Mar	Apr
May	Jun	Jul	Aug
Sep	Oct	Nov	Dec
Unknown date

== January ==
=== 6 January ===
List of shipwrecks: 6 January 1763
Ship	State	Description
Lord Clive	Great Britain	Fantastic War: The privateer was shelled by Spanish artillery, set afire, exploded and sank at Colonia del Sacramento, Banda Oriental with the loss of 272 lives.

=== 8 January ===
List of shipwrecks: 8 January 1763
Ship	State	Description
Elizabeth	British East India Company	The East Indiaman was destroyed by fire in the China Seas.

=== 10 January ===
List of shipwrecks: 10 January 1763
Ship	State	Description
Charles, Duke of Courland	Great Britain	The ship was driven ashore at Plymouth, Devon. She was refloated and found to be severely damaged. She was on a voyage from Danzig to Plymouth.

=== 16 January ===
List of shipwrecks: 16 January 1763
Ship	State	Description
Voorsigtigheijd	Dutch Republic	The ship was destroyed by fire off Cowes, Isle of Wight, Great Britain. She was on a voyage from Bordeaux, France to Amsterdam.

=== 25 January ===
List of shipwrecks: 25 January 1763
Ship	State	Description
San Augustyn Albanes	Spain	The brig was driven ashore and wrecked at Dover, Kent, Great Britain. She was on a voyage from Bilbao to Rouen, France.

=== Unknown date ===
List of shipwrecks: Unknown date 1763
Ship	State	Description
Active	Great Britain	The ship was driven ashore near the North Rock. She was on a voyage from Martinique to Liverpool, Lancashire.
Ann	Great Britain	The ship was lost off Dungarvan, County Waterford, Ireland.
Betsey	Ireland	The ship foundered off Dungarvan, County Waterford with the loss of sixty lives. She was on a voyage from Newfoundland, French America to an Irish port.
Betty Gregg	Great Britain	The ship was driven ashore and wrecked near Stromness, Orkney Islands. She was on a voyage from Arkhangelsk, Russia to New York, British America.
Bonetta	Great Britain	The ship was lost near St. Mary's, Newfoundland, French America with the loss of all hands.
Erskine	Great Britain	The ship was driven ashore near Stromness. She was on a voyage from Gothenburg, Sweden to Campveer, Dutch Republic.
Friendship	Great Britain	The ship was captured by two privateers -, one French, one Spanish - and was burnt. She was on a voyage from Gibraltar to the West Indies.
Hazard	Sweden	The ship was wrecked n the Goodwin Sands, Kent, Great Britain. She was on a voyage from Gothenburg to London, Great Britain.
James	Great Britain	The ship was driven ashore near the North Rock. She was on a voyage from Martinique to Liverpool.
Juno	Great Britain	The ship was lost in the West Indies.
Speedwell	Great Britain	The ship was lost on the Irish coast.
Vaughan	Great Britain	The ship ran aground and was wrecked in the Delaware River. She was on a voyage from Bristol, Gloucestershire to Philadelphia, Pennsylvania, British America.

== February ==
=== 2 February ===
List of shipwrecks: 2 February 1763
Ship	State	Description
Hercules	Great Britain	The transport ship foundered in the Atlantic Ocean 10 leagues (30 nautical miles (56 km)) west of the Isles of Scilly. Her crew were rescued by Jane & Elizabeth (Great Britain).

=== 4 February ===
List of shipwrecks: 4 February 1763
Ship	State	Description
Modeste	Danzig	The ship foundered in the Atlantic Ocean 15 leagues (45 nautical miles (83 km)) off Land's End, cornwall, Great Britain. Her crew survived.
Union	Great Britain	The ship was run down and sunk by HMS Aeolus ( (Kingdom of Great Britain) Royal Navy). Her crew survived. She was on a voyage from London to Antigua.

=== 13 February ===
List of shipwrecks: 13 February 1763
Ship	State	Description
Euphau	Great Britain	The ship was driven ashore and wrecked at Deal, Kent. Her crew were rescued. She was on a voyage from Inverness to Rotterdam, Dutch Republic.
Polly	Great Britain	The ship was driven ashore and wrecked at Deal. Her crew were rescued. She was on a voyage from London to Havre de Grâce, France.

=== 25 February ===
List of shipwrecks: 25 February 1763
Ship	State	Description
Admiral Pocock	Great Britain	The transport ship foundered in the English Channel off Dartmouth, Devon with the loss of all on board.

=== 27 February ===
List of shipwrecks: 27 February 1763
Ship	State	Description
Minerva	Great Britain	The ship was driven ashore and wrecked at Plymouth Hoe, Devon. She was on a voyage from London to Lisbon, Portugal.

=== Unknown date ===
List of shipwrecks: Unknown date 1763
Ship	State	Description
Anna Catharina	Ireland	The ship was driven ashore and wrecked at Clonakilty, County Cork. She was on a voyage from Málaga, Spain to Cork.
Begona	Dutch Republic	The ship was driven ashore at Boulogne, France. She was on a voyage from Bilbao, Spain to London, Great Britain.
Dirk Jacobse	Dutch Republic	The sloop was driven ashore and wrecked near Rye, Sussex, Great Britain. Four of her crew were rescued. She was on a voyage from Bordeaux, France to Rotterdam.
Elizabeth	Great Britain	The ship was driven ashore and wrecked in the Moray Firth. She was on a voyage from Gothenburg, Sweden to Banff, Aberdeenshire.
Frow Elizabeth	Dutch Republic	The ship was driven ashore and wrecked at Rye with the loss of all hands. She was on a voyage from Bordeaux to Rotterdam.
Jufrow Catharina	Dutch Republic	The ship was driven ashore and wrecked near Rye. Her crew were rescued. She was on a voyage from Bordeaux to Rotterdam.
Lyon	Great Britain	The ship was driven ashore and wrecked at Selsea, Sussex. She was on a voyage from South Carolina, British America to London.
Lyons	Great Britain	The ship ran aground in the River Thames and was wrecked at Cuckold's Point, Rotherhithe, Surrey. She was on a voyage from Montserrat to London.
Manchinealo	Great Britain	The ship was driven ashore at Inverary, Argyllshire. She was on a voyage from Jamaica to London.
Nancy	Great Britain	The ship foundered in the English Channel off Hastings, Sussex. Her crew were rescued. She was on a voyage from London to Lisbon, Portugal.
Peggy	Great Britain	The ship foundered in the Atlantic Ocean. Her crew were rescued by Favourite Polly (Great Britain): She was on a voyage from Virginia, British America to London.
Pitt	Great Britain	The frigate foundered in the Atlantic Ocean off the Isles of Scilly. Her crew were rescued. She was on a voyage from Jamaica to London.
Queen Charlotte	Great Britain	The ship was driven ashore and wrecked near Dungeness, Kent with the loss of 22 lives. She was on a voyage from London to Jamaica.
Richard & Hanna	Great Britain	The ship was driven ashore and wrecked at Rye, Sussex. Her crew were rescued. She was on a voyage from Weymouth, Dorset to London.

== March ==
=== 1 March ===
List of shipwrecks: 1 March 1763
Ship	State	Description
Elizabeth	Great Britain	The ship was driven ashore and wrecked near Swansea, Glamorgan with the loss of three lives.

=== 2 March ===
List of shipwrecks: 2 March 1763
Ship	State	Description
HMS San Genaro	(Kingdom of Great Britain) Royal Navy	The 60-gun fourth rate was driven ashore and wrecked at Ramsgate, Kent, Great Britain with the loss of two of her crew.

=== 10 March ===
List of shipwrecks: 10 March 1763
Ship	State	Description
Two Sisters	(Kingdom of Great Britain) Isle of Man	The ship sprang a leak in the Atlantic Ocean 50 leagues (150 nautical miles (280 km) west of Tory Island, County Donegal, Ireland. She was beached in the River Foyle. two Sisters was on a voyage from Douglas to Havana, Captaincy General of Cuba.

=== 11 March ===
List of shipwrecks: 11 March 1763
Ship	State	Description
Friends Goodwill	Great Britain	The collier foundered in the North Sea off Sunderland, County Durham. Her crew were rescued.
Susanna	Great Britain	The ship was lost near Dublin, Ireland. she was on a voyage from Great Yarmouth, Norfolk to Dublin.
Three Brothers	Great Britain	The ship was lost on the coast of Ireland. She was on a voyage from Wadebridge, Cornwall to Liverpool, Lancashire.

=== 12 March ===
List of shipwrecks: 12 March 1763
Ship	State	Description
Prince of Orange	Great Britain	The ship was driven ashore and wrecked at Churston, Devon with the loss of a crew member. She was on a voyage from Ostend, Dutch Republic to Guernsey, Channel Islands and then to London.
Sant Ignazio	Venetian Navy	The San Lorenzo Justinian-class ship of the line was wrecked.

=== 14 March ===
List of shipwrecks: 14 March 1763
Ship	State	Description
Two Brothers	Great Britain	The ship foundered six leagues (18 nautical miles (33 km)) north west by north of The Start. Her crew were rescued by Three Sisters. She was on a voyage from London to Portsmouth, Hampshire.

=== 18 March ===
List of shipwrecks: 18 March 1763
Ship	State	Description
HMS Epreuve	(Kingdom of Great Britain) Royal Navy	The ship-sloop ran aground in the Savannah River, British America and was abandoned. She was salvaged in July, repaired and returned to service.

=== 27 March ===
List of shipwrecks: 27 March 1763
Ship	State	Description
Manhood	Great Britain	The ship foundered in the Atlantic Ocean. Her crew were rescued. She was on a voyage from London to Virginia, British America.

=== Unknown date ===
List of shipwrecks: Unknown date 1763
Ship	State	Description
Anna Maria	Great Britain	The ship was driven ashore and wrecked on Pembrey Sands, Carmarthenshire with the loss of all but two of her crew. She was on a voyage from Virginia, British America to London.
Bermuda's Flying Mercury	Great Britain	The ship foundered in the English Channel off Guernsey, Channel Islands. She was on a voyage from London to Guernsey and Martinique.
Betsey	Great Britain	The ship was wrecked on the South Bull sandbank, in the Irish Sea off County Dublin, Ireland. She was on a voyage from Shoreham-by-Sea, Sussex to Dublin.
Bettey	Great Britain	The ship was driven ashore and wrecked at Cranfield Point, County Down, Ireland. She was on a voyage from Liverpool, Lancashire to Virginia.
Blessed Endeavour	Great Britain	The ship foundered in the North Sea off Great Yarmouth, Norfolk. She was on a voyage from London to Dunbar, Lothian.
Constant Betty	Great Britain	The ship was driven ashore and wrecked at Deal, Kent. Her crew were rescued. She was on a voyage from London to Maryland, British America.
Constant Friend	Great Britain	The ship was driven ashore and wrecked near Pakefield, Suffolk. She was on a voyage from Dublin, Ireland to Great Yarmouth.
Delight	Great Britain	The collier was lost off Harwich, Essex.
Dove	Great Britain	The ship was wrecked on the South Bull. She was on a voyage from Chichester to Dublin.
Europa	Great Britain	The ship foundered in the Atlantic Ocean off the Isles of Scilly. Her crew were rescued by a Dutch vessel. She was on a voyage from London to Lisbon, Portugal.
George	(Kingdom of Great Britain) Royal Navy	The hired armed ship foundered in the English Channel off Beachy Head, Sussex. Her crew were rescued.
Gibraltar	Great Britain	The ship lost her rudder off the coast of Portugal and was abandoned by her crew. All except one perished when their boat capsized. She was on a voyage from Gibraltar to London.
Good Intent	Great Britain	The ship was wrecked on the South Bull. She was on a voyage from Chichester to Dublin.
Griffin	Great Britain	The ship was wrecked on the South Bull. She was on a voyage from Great Yarmouth to Dublin.
Hopewell	Great Britain	The ship was lost 3 leagues (9 nautical miles (17 km)) from Pontevedra, Spain. She was on a voyage from London to Figuera da Foz, Portugal.
London	Great Britain	The ship was driven ashore and wrecked at Deal. Her crew were rescued. She was on a voyage from Topsham, Devon to London.
Neptune	Great Britain	The ship was wrecked on the South Bull with the loss of all 27 crew. She was on a voyage from Liverpool to Africa.
Nossa Senhora das Almas	Portugal	The ship sank at Plymouth, Devon.
Robert	Great Britain	The ship was wrecked on the South Bull. She was on a voyage from London to Liverpool.
Shark	Great Britain	The ship was driven ashore and severely damaged at Portsmouth, Hampshire. She was on a voyage from London to Tenerife, Canary Islands. Shark was refloated in early April.
Six Brothers	Sweden	The ship was driven ashore near Newpor, County Antrim, Ireland. She was on a voyage from Gothenburg to Cork, Ireland.
Success	Great Britain	The ship was driven ashore at Yarmouth, Isle of Wight but was late refloated. She was on a voyage from London to Gibraltar.
Susanna	Great Britain	The ship foundered in the Atlantic Ocean off Land's End, Cornwall with the loss of all hands. She was on a voyage from Falmouth, Cornwall to Swansey, Glamorgan.
Three Friends	Great Britain	The ship was driven ashore and wrecked near Yarmouth, Isle of Wight. She was on a voyage from Chichester, Sussex to Havre de Grâce, France.
Union	Great Britain	The stores ship was wrecked on the South Bull. She was on a voyage from Chester, Cheshire to London.

== April ==
=== 4 April ===
List of shipwrecks: 4 April 1763
Ship	State	Description
Katherine	Great Britain	The brigantine struck a rock off Bermuda and foundered with the loss of five lives. She was on a voyage from Philadelphia, Pennsylvania, British America to Jamaica.

=== Unknown date ===
List of shipwrecks: Unknown date 1763
Ship	State	Description
Albinia	Great Britain	The ship was wrecked on the coast of Florida, British America. Her crew were rescued. She was on a voyage from Jamaica to London.
Diligence	Great Britain	The ship was lost near Calais, France. She was on a voyage from King's Lynn, Norfolk to San Sebastián, Spain.
Rebecca	Great Britain	The ship was driven ashore in the Tagus.
Samuel & Joseph	Great Britain	The ship sank between "Largham" and Tenby, Pembrokeshire. She was on a voyage from Falmouth, Cornwall to a Welsh port.
Sligoe	Ireland	The ship was wrecked off Sligo. She was on a voyage from New York, British America to Sligo.

== May ==
=== 5 May ===
List of shipwrecks: 5 May 1763
Ship	State	Description
Anne's Increase	Great Britain	The ship was lost south of Gothenburg, Sweden. Her crew were rescued. She was on a voyage from Scarborough, Yorkshire to Stockholm, Sweden.

=== Unknown date ===
List of shipwrecks: Unknown date 1763
Ship	State	Description
Craike Castle	Great Britain	The ship capsized at Gravesend, Kent. She was on a voyage from South Shields, County Durham to London.
Good-hope	Great Britain	The ship foundered in the Mediterranean Sea off Bilbao, Spain. She was on a voyage from Amsterdam, Dutch Republic to Bilbao.
Neptune	Great Britain	The ship foundered with the loss of all hands. She was on a voyage from Pool, Dorset to Liverpool, Lancashire.
Russia Merchant	Great Britain	The ship was lost on the coast of Sweden. She was on a voyage from London to Stockholm.
Young Henry	Ireland	The ship foundered in the Bay of Biscay. Her crew were rescued. She was on a voyage from Cork to Lisbon, Portugal.

== June ==
=== 23 June ===
List of shipwrecks: 23 June 1763
Ship	State	Description
Earl of Albemarle	Great Britain	The ship foundered in the Atlantic Ocean off Virginia, British America. Her crew survived. She was on a voyage from Havana, Captaincy General of Cuba to London.

== July ==
=== Unknown date ===
List of shipwrecks: Unknown date 1763
Ship	State	Description
Boscawen	Great Britain	The ship was lost at Holyhead, Anglesey with the loss of all hands. She was on a voyage from Liverpool, Lancashire to Africa.
Britannia	Great Britain	The ship was lost at Cádiz, Spain.
Charlotte	Great Britain	The ship was destroyed by an explosion in the River Mersey. She was on a voyage from Liverpool to Guinea.
Dolly & Nancy	Ireland	The ship was lost off the coast of Cuba. She was on a voyage from Cork to Havana, Captaincy General of Cuba.
Gallaway	Great Britain	The ship was wrecked on the Seven Stones Reef, off the coast of Cornwall with the loss of two lives. She was on a voyage from Saint Kitts to London.
Macey	Great Britain	The ship sank off Penzance, Cornwall. Her crew were rescued. She was on a voyage from Boston, Massachusetts, British America to London.
Molly	(Kingdom of Great Britain) Isle of Man	The ship was lost near Holyhead. She was on a voyage from Montserrat to the Isle of Man.
Warren	Great Britain	The ship was driven ashore at Selsea, Sussex. She was on a voyage from Nevis to London.

== August ==
=== Unknown date ===
List of shipwrecks: Unknown date 1763
Ship	State	Description
Mercurio	Spanish Navy	The frigate was lost near Cape Catoche, Viceroyalty of New Granada. she was on a voyage from Cádiz to Havana, Captaincy General of Cuba.

== September ==
=== 1 September ===
List of shipwrecks: 1 September 1763
Ship	State	Description
Betty	Great Britain	The ship was destroyed by fire off the "Western Islands". Her crew were rescued after five days in the ship's boats. She was on a voyage from Jamaica to London.

=== 6 September ===
List of shipwrecks: 6 September 1763
Ship	State	Description
Ipswich	Great Britain	The ship foundered in the North Sea. Her crew were rescued. She was on a voyage from Stockholm, Sweden to London.

=== 8 September ===
List of shipwrecks: 8 September 1763
Ship	State	Description
John and Ann	Great Britain	The ship was driven ashore near St. Lucar, Spain. She was on a voyage from London to Cádiz and Seville, Spain.

=== 9 September ===
List of shipwrecks: 9 September 1763
Ship	State	Description
George	Sweden	The ship was wrecked on the Anholt Reef, in the Kattegat. She was on a voyage from Stockholm to Livorno, Grand Duchy of Tuscany.
John	Ireland	The ship was driven ashore at Calais, France. She was on a voyage from Hamburg to Limerick.

=== 10 September ===
List of shipwrecks: 10 September 1763
Ship	State	Description
Mary and Ann	Great Britain	The ship was driven ashore and wrecked on Skagen, Denmark. She was on a voyage from London to Saint Petersburg, Russia.

=== Unknown date ===
List of shipwrecks: Unknown date 1763
Ship	State	Description
Good Intent	Great Britain	The ship foundered in the North Sea. She was on a voyage from Gothenburg, Sweden to Wells-next-the-Sea, Norfolk and London.

== October ==
=== 2 October ===
List of shipwrecks: 2 October 1763
Ship	State	Description
Elizabeth and Joanna	Great Britain	The ship was driven ashore at Bamburgh Castle, Northumberland with the loss of a crew member. She was on a voyage from Middleburg to Dysart, Fife.
Susanna	Great Britain	The ship was driven ashore and wrecked at Northam, Devon. She was on a voyage from Dumfries to Varberg, Sweden.

=== 3 October ===
List of shipwrecks: 3 October 1763
Ship	State	Description
Bardsea	Great Britain	The ship was wrecked near Strumble Head, Pembrokeshire. She was on a voyage from Wicklow, Ireland to Chepstow, Monmouthshire.
Herie	Great Britain	The ship was driven ashore at Goodwick Sands, Pembrokeshire. She was on a voyage from Liverpool, Lancashire to Grenada and Saint Kitts.
Mariana	France	The ship was driven ashore and wrecked between Padstow and St Ives, Cornwall, Great Britain. The wreck was plundered by the local inhabitants. She was on a voyage from Marseille to Havre de Grâce.
Phœnix	Ireland	The ship was driven ashore and wrecked at Newport, County Dublin with the loss of all but one of those on board. She was on a voyage from London, Great Britain to Dublin.

=== 8 October ===
List of shipwrecks: 8 October 1763
Ship	State	Description
Jane and Barbary	Great Britain	The ship was wrecked on the Haisborough Sands, in the North Sea off the coast of Norfolk with the loss of at least 75 lives. She was on a voyage from Plymouth, Devon to Great Yarmouth, Norfolk, South Shields, County Durham and Leith, Lothian.

=== 12 October ===
List of shipwrecks: 12 October 1763
Ship	State	Description
Providence	Great Britain	The ship foundered in the North Sea 13 leagues (39 nautical miles (72 km) off Great Yarmouth, Norfolk with the loss of five of her crew. She was on a voyage from Stockholm, Sweden to Ipswich, Suffolk.

=== 14 October ===
List of shipwrecks: 14 October 1763
Ship	State	Description
Robert and Elizabeth	Great Britain	The ship struck a rock and sank off Madeira with the loss of at least 220 lives. Seventeen people were rescued. She was on a voyage from Liverpool, Lancashire to South Carolina, British America.
Sally	Great Britain	The ship foundered. Her crew were rescued by a Swedish vessel. She was on a voyage from Málaga, Spain to London.

=== 21 October ===
List of shipwrecks: 21 October 1763
Ship	State	Description
Calcutta	Great Britain	The snow foundered at Madras, India.
Fazala Hawke	Great Britain	The ship foundered at Madras.
Hope	Great Britain	The ship foundered at Madras.
London	Great Britain	The snow was driven ashore and wrecked at Madras.
Nelly	Great Britain	The snow was driven ashore and wrecked at Madras.
Neptune	Great Britain	The snow foundered at Madras.
Sea-boat	Great Britain	The snow was driven ashore and wrecked at Madras.
Speedwell	Great Britain	The snow was driven ashore and wrecked at Madras.
Success	Great Britain	The snow was driven ashore and wrecked at Madras.
Trial	Great Britain	The ketch was driven ashore and wrecked at Madras.
Union	Great Britain	The full-rigged ship was driven ashore and wrecked at Madras.

=== Unknown date ===
List of shipwrecks: Unknown date 1763
Ship	State	Description
Bridlington	Great Britain	The ship was driven ashore at Waxham, Norfolk. She was on a voyage from Narva, Russia to London.
Burlington	Great Britain	The ship was wrecked on the Haisborough Sands, in the North Sea off the coast of Norfolk. She was on a voyage from Narva to London.
Charming Betty	Great Britain	The collier was driven ashore between North Shields, County Durham and Blyth, Northumberland.
Dolphin	Great Britain	The collier foundered.
Duke	Great Britain	The ship was lost near Sheerness, Kent.
Elizabeth	Great Britain	The ship was lost near Berwick-upon-Tweed with the loss of a crew member. She was on a voyage from London to Dundee, Perthshire.
Good Intent	Great Britain	The ship was driven ashore at Sunderland, County Durham.
Gordyx	flag unknown	The galiot was wrecked in the English Channel on or before 5 October.
Gottenburgh Merchant	Great Britain	The ship foundered in the North Sea 17 leagues (51 nautical miles (94 km) off Great Yarmouth. Her crew took to the boats and were rescued the next day by a Swedish vessel.
John & Henry	Great Britain	The ship was lost.
John and Sarah	Great Britain	The ship was driven ashore near Boulogne, France. She was on a voyage from Philadelphia, Pennsylvania, British America to Great Yarmouth, Norfolk.
Katherine's Increase	Great Britain	The ship was driven ashore near Dover, Kent. She was on a voyage from Saint Petersburg to Dublin, Ireland.
Laurel	Great Britain	The ship ran aground on the Kentish Knock. She was on a voyage from Saint Petersburg, Russia to Bristol, Gloucestershire.
Mary	Great Britain	The ship was lost.
Mary	Great Britain	The ship was lost at Redcar, Yorkshire.
Nelly	Great Britain	The ship was driven ashore at Sunderland with the loss of all hands.
Nightingale	Great Britain	The collier was driven ashore between North Shields and Blyth.
Prince George	Great Britain	The collier was driven ashore between North Shields and Blyth.
Providence	Great Britain	The collier foundered.
Richard	Great Britain	The collier was driven ashore at Robin Hood's Bay, Yorkshire.
Sarah	Great Britain	The ship sprang a leak and foundered. Her crew were rescued. She was on a voyage from Virginia, British America to Liverpool.
Seventh Son of William Bartholomew	Ireland	The ship was wrecked on Bornholm, Denmark. She was on a voyage from Danzig to Belfast
St. Johannes	Sweden	The ship was driven ashore and wrecked on Skagen. She was on a voyage from Stockholm to Hull, Yorkshire.
Success	Great Britain	The ship was lost near Dunbar, Lothian. She was on a voyage from Arkhangelsk, Russia to London.
Triton	Ireland	The ship foundered in St Brides Bay. She was on a voyage from Saint Petersburg to Dublin.
Two Brothers	Great Britain	The collier was driven ashore at Sunderland.
Victory	Great Britain	The ship foundered whilst on a voyage from the Île d'Oléron, France to the Isle of Man.
Young Jacob	Danzig	The ship was wrecked on Bornholm. She was on a voyage from Danzig to Ferrol, Spain.

== November ==
=== 1 November ===
List of shipwrecks: 1 November 1763
Ship	State	Description
Countess of Leicester	Great Britain	The ship was wrecked on the coast of North Carolina, British America with the loss of five lives. She was on a voyage from Falmouth, Cornwall to New York, British America.

=== 7 November ===
List of shipwrecks: 7 November 1763
Ship	State	Description
Lapomink (Лапоминк)	Imperial Russian Navy	The pink was holed by ice and sank at Kronstadt. She was refloated in 1764, repaired and returned to service.

=== 10 November ===
List of shipwrecks: 10 November 1763
Ship	State	Description
Prince George	Great Britain	The troopship was lost at Fyall, Azores. All on board were rescued. She was on a voyage from British America to Portsmouth, Hampshire.

=== 14 November ===
List of shipwrecks: 14 November 1763
Ship	State	Description
Betty and Peggy	Great Britain	The ship was lost on the coast of Newfoundland, French America.

=== 19 November ===
List of shipwrecks: 19 November 1763
Ship	State	Description
Mayflower	Great Britain	The ship was driven ashore and wrecked on Goree, Dutch Republic. She was on a voyage from Wells-next-the-Sea, Norfolk to Rotterdam, Dutch Republic.

=== 20 November ===
List of shipwrecks: 20 November 1763
Ship	State	Description
Notra Dame de Burgoyne	Spain	The ship was driven ashore and wrecked 3 nautical miles (5.6 km) west of Dover, Kent, Great Britain. She was on a voyage from Bilbao to London, Great Britain.

=== 27 November ===
List of shipwrecks: 27 November 1763
Ship	State	Description
Royal George	Great Britain	The ship foundered in The Downs. Her crew were rescued.

=== Unknown date ===
List of shipwrecks: Unknown date 1763
Ship	State	Description
Constant John	Great Britain	The transport ship was wrecked near Bordeaux, France with the loss of two of her crew.
Cumberland	Great Britain	The ship was driven ashore and wrecked at Great Yarmouth, Norfolk. She was on a voyage from Memel Prussia to London.
Margaret and Harriot	Great Britain	The ship was wrecked on Anticortea, in the Gulf of Saint Lawrence with the loss of a crew member. She was on a voyage from Plymouth, Devon to Quebec.
Polly	Great Britain	The ship was driven ashore near Wells-next-the-Sea, Norfolk. She was on a voyage from Hull, Yorkshire to London.
Solide	France	The ship was lost whilst on a voyage from the Charante to Dunkirk.
St. Mary	Great Britain	The ship was wrecked on the French coast, 5 leagues (15 nautical miles (28 km) from Cherbourg. Her crew were rescued. She was on a voyage from London to Jamaica.
Two Brothers	Great Britain	The brig was in collision with Britannia (Great Britain) and sank in the English Channel off Beachy Head, Sussex. Two of her crew jumped aboard Britannia.
York	Great Britain	The ship was driven ashore and wrecked in Caernarvon Bay. She was on a voyage from Virginia, British America to Liverpool, Lancashire.

== December ==
=== 1 December ===
List of shipwrecks: 1 December 1763
Ship	State	Description
Nelly	Great Britain	The ship was driven ashore 3 nautical miles (5.6 km) from Scarborough, Yorkshire and severely damaged. She was on a voyage from Berwick upon Tweed to Livorno, Grand Duchy of Tuscany.
Nostra Señora de Begona	Spain	The ship was driven ashore and wrecked at Bilbao with the loss of two of her crew. She was on a voyage from San Sebastián to Bilbao.
Success	Ireland	The ship was abandoned in the Atlantic Ocean. Her crew were rescued by Echo (Ireland. She was on a voyage from Lisbon, Portugal to Cork.
Two Friends	Great Britain	The pilot boat was wrecked on the Welsh coast with the loss of six lives.

=== 2 December ===
List of shipwrecks: 2 December 1763
Ship	State	Description
Exchange	Great Britain	The ship was wrecked near Lowestoft, Suffolk with the loss of all but three of her crew. She was on a voyage from Newcastle upon Tyne, Northumberland to Plymouth, Devon.
Roan Packet	Great Britain	The ship was lost 6 leagues (18 nautical miles (33 km) east of Ostend, Dutch Republic with the loss of two of her crew. She was on a voyage from Great Yarmouth, Norfolk to Rotterdam, Dutch Republic.
Saville	Great Britain	The ship was wrecked on an island north of Ireland. She was on a voyage from Philadelphia, Pennsylvania, British America to Hull, Yorkshire.
Success	Great Britain	The ship was driven ashore and wrecked at Blankenberge, Dutch Republic. Her crew were rescued. She was on a voyage from Great Yarmouth to Rotterdam.

=== 3 December ===
List of shipwrecks: 3 December 1763
Ship	State	Description
William and Mary	Great Britain	The ship was driven ashore and wrecked at Lowestoft, Suffolk.

=== 12 December ===
List of shipwrecks: 12 December 1763
Ship	State	Description
Ann	Great Britain	The ship was driven ashore and wrecked on Rotta Point, Spain. Her crew were rescued. She was on a voyage from Newfoundland, French America to the Strait of Gibraltar.
Charming Polly	Great Britain	The ship was lost near Tingmouth, Devon. She was on a voyage from Seville, Spain to London.
Kitty	Great Britain	The ship was driven ashore near St. Lucar, Spain. She was refloated but found to be severely damaged. She was on a voyage from Newfoundland to Genoa.
O'Donovan	Ireland	The ship was lost near Saint Malo, France with the loss of all but one of her crew. She was on a voyage from Cork to Nantes, France.

=== 13 December ===
List of shipwrecks: 13 December 1763
Ship	State	Description
Hanover	Great Britain	The brigantine was lost under Cligga Head, Cornwall while seeking shelter in the lee of the shore. She was a packet boat on a journey from Lisbon to Falmouth, Cornwall. Of the thirty crew and passengers only three survived. Most of her cargo of gold coin was recovered. The wreck was discovered in Hanover Cove (grid reference SW736532) during June, 1994 by Colin Martin and confirmed as the Hanover with the recovery of a bronze bell inscribed "THE HANOVER PACQUET, 1757". In 1997, fifty cannon, a gold ring and part of the ship's structure was recovered. The site is designated as a scheduled monument.

=== 18 December ===
List of shipwrecks: 18 December 1763
Ship	State	Description
Prince Henry	Great Britain	The ship foundered in the Atlantic Ocean off Land's End, Cornwall. Her crew were rescued. She was on a voyage from Chester, Cheshire to London.

=== 20 December ===
List of shipwrecks: 20 December 1763
Ship	State	Description
Bella	Great Britain	The ship was lost on the Bahama Banks. Her crew were rescued. She was on a voyage from Havana, Captaincy General of Cuba to Liverpool, Lancashire.
Two ships	Dutch Republic	The ships were wrecked on the Goodwin Sands, Kent, Great Britain. One was on a voyage from Amsterdam to Surinam, the other was on a voyage from Surinam to Amsterdam.

=== 23 December ===
List of shipwrecks: 23 December 1763
Ship	State	Description
Juno	Ireland	The ship was lost near Saint Malo, France. She was on a voyage from Cork to Havre de Grâce, France.
Peggy	Ireland	The ship was driven ashore and wrecked at Portland Bill, Dorset, Great Britain. She was on a voyage from Cork to Dunkirk, France.

=== 26 December ===
List of shipwrecks: 26 December 1763
Ship	State	Description
Dorothea	Ireland	The ship was lost near Clonakilty, County Cork. She was on a voyage from the Charante to Dublin.
Union	Great Britain	The ship was lost off Kilbrittain, County Cork. She was on a voyage from Bristol, Gloucestershire to Limerick, Ireland.

=== 28 December ===
List of shipwrecks: 28 December 1763
Ship	State	Description
La Louisa	France	The ship was driven ashore and wrecked at Plymouth, Devon, Great Britain with the loss of all but five of her crew. She was on a voyage from Saint-Malo to Africa.

=== 29 December ===
List of shipwrecks: 29 December 1763
Ship	State	Description
Union	Sweden	The ship was lost near Limmington, Hampshire, Great Britain with the loss of a crew member. She was on a voyage from St. Ubes, Portugal to Gothenburg.

=== 30 December ===
List of shipwrecks: 30 December 1763
Ship	State	Description
Hannah	Great Britain	The ship was lost near Crosby, Lancashire with the loss of all but two of her crew. She was on a voyage from Virginia, British America to Liverpool, Lancashire.
Peter and Ann	Great Britain	The ship was driven ashore at Eastney, Hampshire. Her crew were rescued. She was later refloated.

=== Unknown date ===
List of shipwrecks: Unknown date 1763
Ship	State	Description
Antigua Packet	Ireland	The ship was wrecked on the Irish coast. She was on a voyage from the Charante to Dublin.
Boscawen	Great Britain	The ship was driven ashore and wrecked at King's Lynn, Norfolk, She was on a voyage from Newcastle upon Tyne, Northumberland to King's Lynn.
Briton	Great Britain	The ship was wrecked on the Winterton Middle Sand, in the North Sea off the coast of Norfolk with the loss of all but two of her crew. She was on a voyage from South Shields, County Durham to London.
Charming Kitty	Great Britain	The ship was driven ashore and wrecked at Alnmouth, Northumberland. She was on a voyage from Hamburg to Africa.
Free Love	Great Britain	The collier was lost in The Swin with the loss of all but one of her crew.
Friede	Denmark	The ship was lost near Skagen.
Grace and Bella	Great Britain	The ship was driven ashore at Burntisland, Fife. She was on a voyage from Berwick-upon-Tweed to London.
Industry	Great Britain	The ship was wrecked on Flat Holm. She was on a voyage from Newfoundland, French America to Bristol, Gloucestershire.
King of Prussia	Great Britain	The ship was lost near Christiansand, Norway. She was on a voyage from Onega, Russia to London.
Letitia	Great Britain	The ship ran aground on the Pollard, in the North Sea off Whitstable, Kent. She was on a voyage from Philadelphia, Pennsylvania, British America to London.
Marquis of Granby	Great Britain	The ship was lost at the mouth of the Arno. she was on a voyage from Newfoundland to Livorno, Grand Duchy of Tuscany.
Mary	Great Britain	The ship was lost on the Spaniard Sand, in the North Sea off Margate, Kent. She was on a voyage from Virginia, British America to London.
Mary-Ann	Ireland	The ship was driven ashore at Holyhead, Anglesey. She was on a voyage from the West Indies to Dublin.
Nancy	Great Britain	The ship was lost near Great Yarmout. She was on a voyage from London to Newcastle upon Tyne.
Neptune	Ireland	The ship capsized in Dublin Bay. She was on a voyage from Dublin to Cádiz, Spain.
Peggy	Great Britain	The ship was wrecked on the coast of the Isle of Man. Her crew were rescued. She was on a voyage from Liverpool, Lancashire to Sligo, Ireland.
Plumper	Great Britain	The ship was wrecked at Point Lynas, Anglesey with the loss of eight lives. She was on a voyage from Jamaica to London.
Polly	Great Britain	The ship was driven ashore at Margate. She was on a voyage from Virginia to London.
Prince Henry	Great Britain	The transport ship was driven ashore at Faversham, Kent. She was on a voyage from Jamaica to London
Providence	Great Britain	The ship was driven ashore and wrecked on the coast of Norfolk. She was on a voyage from King's Lynn to London.
Providence	Ireland	The ship departed from Bordeaux, France for Dublin on 4 December. She subsequently foundered in the Irish Sea with the loss of all hands.
Providential Rebekah	Great Britain	The ship was wrecked on Læsø, Denmark. She was on a voyage from Saint Petersburg to London.
Ranger	Ireland	The ship was driven ashore at Bilbao, Spain. She was on a voyage from Londonderry to Bilbao.
Royal Charlotte	Great Britain	The ship was lost whilst on a voyage from South Shields to Plymouth, Devon.
Sophia Elizabeth	Great Britain	The ship foundered in the Baltic Sea. She was on a voyage from London to "Statren".
St. Andrew	Great Britain	The ship was driven ashore and wrecked on the Flemish coast with the loss of all hands. She was on a voyage from Rotterdam, Dutch Republic to Aberdeen.
St. Nicholas	Russian Empire	The ship was driven ashore and wrecked at Åbo Sweden. She was on a voyage from Saint Petersburg to London.
Sv. Zakharii i Elizaveta	Russian Empire	The vessel was burned by Aleut natives in Captains Bay, Unalaska Island, Alaska.
Tom and Jack	Great Britain	The ship was driven ashore near La Rochelle, France. She was on a voyage from Bordeaux to Hull.
Trial	Great Britain	The ship was lost on the coast of Yorkshire. She was on a voyage from Cromer, Norfolk to Sunderland, County Durham.
Turnpenny and Blewitt	Great Britain	The ship was driven ashore and wrecked at Margate. She was on a voyage from London to Falmouth, Cornwall.
William and Mary	Great Britain	The ship sank in the River Thames at Ratcliff Cross, London. She was bound for Senegal.

== Unknown date ==
List of shipwrecks: Unknown date 1763
Ship	State	Description
Adventure	Great Britain	The transport ship foundered in the Atlantic Ocean. Her crew were rescued by Benjamin's Conclusion (Great Britain). She was on a voyage from South Carolina, British America to London.
Alexander	Great Britain	The ship was wrecked on The Martiers, west of Cape Florida, British America. She was on a voyage from Jamaica to London.
Amstelveen	Dutch East India Company	The East Indiaman was wrecked on the coast of Oman with the loss of 75 of her 105 crew.
Aurora	Hamburg	The ship foundered in the Atlantic Ocean off the Barbary Coast. Her crew survived. She was on a voyage from Hamburg to the Canary Islands.
Countess of Leicester	Great Britain	The ship countered in the Atlantic Ocean off the coast of British America with the loss of four of her crew. She was on a voyage from Falmouth, Cornwall to New York, British America.
Edinburgh	Great Britain	The ship was lost in ice off the coast of Greenland. Leith rescued the crew and brought them into Leith.(Great Britain).
Edward	Great Britain	The ship was wrecked at Aruba. She was on a voyage from St Martin's, Hispaniola to Curaçao and Jamaica.
Favourite	Great Britain	The ship capsized with the loss of most of her crew. She was on a voyage from Savannah, Georgia, British America to Jamaica.
Friends	(Kingdom of Great Britain) Guernsey	The ship was captured by a French privateer and was subsequently wrecked on Saint Domingo. She was on a voyage from Guernsey to Martinique.
Friends Endeavour	Great Britain	The ship was lost at Sunbury, Georgia, British America. She was on a voyage from Sunbury to London.
Good Intent	Great Britain	The ship ran aground in the Saint Lawrence River. She was on a voyage from London to Quebec, New France. She was later refloated and taken in to Quebec.
Havanna	(Kingdom of Great Britain) British America	The ship was lost in the Windward Passage off Cape Maize. She was on a voyage from New England to Jamaica.
Hellen	Great Britain	The ship ran aground in the Saint Lawrence River.
Industry	Great Britain	The ship was lost in the Saint Lawrence River. Her crew were rescued by Judith (Great Britain). She was on a voyage from Bristol, Gloucestershire to Boston, Massachusetts, British America.
John	Great Britain	The ship foundered off Barbuda. Her crew were rescued. She was on a voyage from Lancaster, Lancashire to the Leeward Islands.
Katy Mullett	(Kingdom of Great Britain) British America	The ship was lost at Martinique. Her crew were rescued. She was on a voyage from New England to Martinique.
Kingfisher	Ireland	The ship foundered in the Atlantic Ocean. She was on a voyage from New York, British America to Limerick.
Lark	Great Britain	The ship was lost near Pillau, Prussia. She was on a voyage from Newcastle upon Tyne, Northumberland to Königsberg, Prussia.
Lord Clive	Great Britain	The privateer was destroyed by fire at Nova Colonia de Sacramento, Viceroyalty of the Río de la Plata.
Nancy	Great Britain	The ship was lost off Sandy Point Her crew were rescued. She was on a voyage from Guadeloupe to London.
Newfoundland	Great Britain	The ship foundered whilst on a voyage from Cádiz to Newfoundland, French America.
Patty	Great Britain	The ship was lost at New Providence, Bahamas. She was on a voyage from Bristol to New Providence.
Pitt Packet	Ireland	The ship foundered off Philadelphia, Pennsylvania, British America with the loss of all on board. She was on a voyage from Belfast to Philadelphia.
Providence	Great Britain	The ship was wrecked in the Saint Lawrence River. She was on a voyage from Quebec to London.
Royal Charlotte	Great Britain	The ship was lost on Long Bay, South Carolina, British America. She was on a voyage from Montserrat to Georgia, British America.
Royal Duke	Great Britain	The ship was wrecked on Barbuda before 6 February. She was on a voyage from Guadeloupe to London.
Sally	Great Britain	The ship was sunk by ice off the coast of Newfoundland, French America.
St. Jago	Portugal	The ship struck a rock and foundered. She was on a voyage from the River Plate to Lisbon.
Sv. Ioann	Russian Empire	The vessel was looted and burned by Aleut natives while anchored in Nikolski Bay, Umnak Island, Alaska sometime during the winter of 1763–1764.
Sv. Nikolai	Russian Empire	The vessel was attacked and likely destroyed by Aleut natives in Isanotski Strait, Alaska in late 1763 or early 1764.
Temple	Great Britain	The ship struck rocks and was wrecked off Anguilla with some loss of life. She was on a voyage from Liverpool, Lancashire to Jamaica.
Two Friends	Great Britain	The ship was lost at Newfoundland.
Union	Great Britain	The ship foundered in the Atlantic Ocean off Cape Fear, North Carolina, British America. She was on a voyage from Barbados to North Carolina.
William	Great Britain	The ship was lost off Newfoundland. She was on a voyage from Teignmouth, Devon to Lisbon and Newfoundland.
York	Great Britain	The ship was lost in the Windward Passage off "Tiberoon". She was on a voyage from Jamaica to London.
Young William	Great Britain	The ship was lost on the Middle Ground. She was on a voyage from St Martins to Cape Fear.
