= HMS Sunderland (1724) =

Royal Navy ship

History

Great Britain
- Name: HMS Sunderland
- Ordered: 31 March 1721
- Builder: Chatham Dockyard, Chatham, Kent
- Launched: 30 April 1724
- Fate: Foundered, 1761

General characteristics as built
- Class & type: 1719 Establishment 60-gun fourth rate ship of the line
- Tons burthen: 951 (bm)
- Length: 144 ft (43.9 m) (gundeck)
- Beam: 39 ft (11.9 m)
- Depth of hold: 16 ft 5 in (5.0 m)
- Propulsion: Sails
- Sail plan: Full-rigged ship
- Armament: Gundeck: 24 × 24-pounder guns; Upper gundeck: 26 × 9-pounder guns; QD: 8 × 6-pounder guns; Fc: 2 × 6-pounder guns

General characteristics after 1744 rebuild
- Class & type: 1741 proposals 58-gun fourth rate ship of the line
- Tons burthen: 1123 (bm)
- Length: 147 ft (44.8 m) (gundeck)
- Beam: 42 ft (12.8 m)
- Depth of hold: 18 ft 1 in (5.5 m)
- Propulsion: Sails
- Sail plan: Full-rigged ship
- Armament: Gundeck: 24 × 24-pounder guns; Upper gundeck: 24 × 12-pounder guns; QD: 8 × 6-pounder guns; Fc: 2 × 6-pounder guns

HMS Sunderland was a 60-gun fourth rate ship of the line of the Royal Navy, built to the 1719 Establishment at Chatham Dockyard, and launched on 30 April 1724.

On 25 December 1742 Sunderland was ordered to be taken to pieces for rebuilding as a 58-gun fourth rate to the 1741 proposals of the 1719 Establishment at Portsmouth Dockyard, from where she was relaunched on 4 April 1744.

Sunderland sailed from Portsmouth on 6 May 1758, bound for Madras. She sailed in convoy with the 74-gun HMS Grafton and the East Indiaman Pitt.

On 1 January 1761, Sunderland was caught in a cyclone off Pondicherry, India, and foundered. She had been anchored and attempted to go out to sea, but was unable to and so reanchored. The storm overwhelmed her and she foundered six miles north of the anchorage; 376 of her crew died and 17 survived. The same storm claimed four other warships as well. HMS Duc D'Aquitaine foundered in much the same manner as Sunderland, and with a similar outcome. HMS Newcastle, HMS Queenborough, and HMS Protector were all driven onshore and wrecked.
