= French ship Duc d'Aquitaine =

French ship of the line

History

France
- Name: Duc d'Aquitaine
- Owner: Compagnie des Indes
- Builder: Nicholas Levasseur, Lorient
- Laid down: September 1753
- Launched: 22 July 1754
- Commissioned: January 1755
- Captured: 30 May 1757

Great Britain
- Name: Duc D'Aquitaine
- Acquired: 30 May 1757
- In service: April 1758
- Out of service: 1 January 1761
- Fate: Wrecked

General characteristics
- Class & type: East Indiaman (1754-57); Third rate (1758-61)
- Displacement: ~2,300 tons
- Tons burthen: 1,358 (bm)
- Length: 159 ft 5 in (48.59 m) (gundeck); 143 ft 10 in (43.84 m) (keel)
- Beam: 42 ft 7 in (12.98 m)
- Depth of hold: 18 ft 1 in (5.51 m)
- Propulsion: Sails
- Sail plan: Full-rigged ship
- Complement: 269 (1755); 493 (1757); 590 (1758)
- Armament: 20 guns (1755); 50 guns (1757); 64 guns (1758)

Duc d'Aquitaine was a 64-gun East Indiaman of the Compagnie des Indes, launched in 1754. On 30 May 1757, she was captured by the Royal Navy and commissioned as the third rate HMS Duc D'Aquitaine. She foundered in 1761 and was lost.

== Construction ==
The ship was 159 feet 10 inches (48.72 m) long at the gundeck (143 feet 10 inches (43.84 m) at the keel), with a beam of 42 feet 7 inches (12.98 m) and a depth of 18 feet 1 inch (5.51 m). (Note: In Pied du Roi, these measurements were 150' 0", 135 0", 40' 0" and 17' 0" respectively.) She was assessed at 1,358 tons Builder's Old Measurement, with a displacement of about 2,300 tons. Propulsion was by sails, and she was rigged as a full-rigged ship.

== Armament ==
Provision was made for her to carry 64 guns. As built, she was armed with 4×36-pounder guns and 16×12-pounder guns, giving a broadside of 168 livres (181.30 pounds (82.24 kg)). Her complement was 260, comprised eleven officers and 249 men. By 1757, she had been equipped with 50×18-pounder guns, giving a broadside of 450 livres (485.64 pounds (220.28 kg)). Her complement was now 493.

== Merchant service ==
Duc d'Acquitaine was built by Nicholas Levasseur at Lorient, Brittany for the Compagnie des Indes. Her keel was laid in September 1753. She was launched on 22 July 1754 and commissioned in January 1755 under the command of capitaine d'Esquelen.

=== Capture ===
Duc d'Acquitaine was a casualty of the Seven Years' War. In May 1757, she departed from Lisbon, Portugal with orders to capture HMS Mermaid. During her cruise, she captured a British merchant brig, which was ransomed for £200. On 30 May, she was captured off Ouessant, Brittany by HMS Eagle and HMS Medway. Duc d'Acquitaine struck her colours after a 45-minute battle. She lost 50 crew, with 22 severely wounded and many more wounded. HMS Eagle lost ten crew with 32 wounded. HMS Medway had ten wounded.

== Naval service ==
Duc d'Acquitaine lost all her masts in the battle. She was taken to Plymouth Dockyard, Devon, Great Britain for assessment. On 23 June 1757, she was purchased by the Admiralty for £12,310, keeping her name. She was placed under the command of Washington Shirley on 7 March 1758. Refitting was completed in April at a cost of £4,596, 14s, 6d. She was now armed with 24×24-pounder, 26×12-pounder, 12×6-pounder and 2×9-pounder guns, giving a broadside of 489 pounds (222 kg). Her complement was 590 men. On 5 June, she participated in the Raid on St Malo. Between December 1758 and March 1759, she was refitted at Plymouth Dockyard at a cost of £14,543, 14s, 2d. She was placed under the command of captain Sir William Hewett on 29 January. HMS Duc d'Acquitaine departed for the East Indies on 14 April.

=== Fate ===
On 1 January 1761, HMS Duc d'Aquitaine was caught in a cyclone off Pondicherry, India She had been anchored and attempted to go out to sea, but was unable to and so reanchored. The storm overwhelmed her and she foundered; only 19 men survived. The same storm claimed four other warships as well. HMS Sunderland foundered in much the same manner as HMS Duc D'Aquitaine, and with a similar outcome. HMS Newcastle, HMS Queenborough, and HMS Protector were all driven onshore and wrecked.
