= HMS Newcastle (1750) =

Ship of the line of the Royal Navy

History

Great Britain
- Name: HMS Newcastle
- Ordered: 11 November 1745
- Builder: Peirson Lock, Portsmouth Dockyard
- Laid down: 17 June 1746
- Launched: 4 December 1750
- Commissioned: March 1755
- In service: 1755–1761
- Fate: Wrecked off Pondicherry, 1 January 1761

General characteristics
- Class & type: 1745 Establishment 50-gun fourth rate ship of the line
- Tons burthen: 1052 46/94(bm)
- Length: 144 ft (43.9 m) (gundeck); 117 ft 8 in (35.9 m) (keel)
- Beam: 41 ft 0 in (12.5 m)
- Depth of hold: 17 ft 8 in (5.4 m)
- Sail plan: Full-rigged ship
- Complement: 350
- Armament: Gundeck: 22 × 24-pounder guns; Upper deck: 22 × 12-pounder guns; Quarterdeck: 4 × 6-pounder guns; Forecastle: 2 × 6-pounder guns

HMS Newcastle was a 50-gun fourth rate ship of the line of the Royal Navy, built by Peirson Lock at Portsmouth Dockyard and launched in 1750 for active service during the Seven Years' War against France. Principally engaged in defending British settlements in India, she was wrecked in a storm off Pondicherry in January 1761.

== Fate ==
On 1 January 1761, a cyclone off Pondicherry, drove Newcastle, HMS Queenborough, and HMS Protector onshore, where they wrecked. Newcastle was able to leave harbour, but the wind shifted, impeding her and eventually driving her ashore two miles south of Pondicherry. The same storm also caught HMS Duc D'Aquitaine and HMS Sunderland. They tried to get out to open water, but were unable to. When they anchored the sea overwhelmed them and they both foundered, each with the loss of almost all on board. The former Captain, Sir Digby Dent, survived, having transferred command to Captain Richard Collins exactly one year before. Collins also survived the wreck.
