= French America =

French-speaking community of people

- Area: 1,730,696 km^{2} (668,225 sq mi)
- Population: 20,237,336
- Demonym: French American; Franco-American
- Countries: List: Canada; Dominica; Haiti; Saint Lucia
- Dependencies: List: French Guiana; Guadeloupe; Martinique; Saint Barthélemy; Saint Martin; Saint Pierre and Miquelon
- Languages: French
- Time zones: UTC−03:00 (French Guiana) to UTC−08:00 (Canada)
- Largest cities: 1. Montreal (Canada); 2. Port-au-Prince (Haiti); 3. Gatineau (Canada); 4. Quebec City (Canada); 5. Gonaïves (Haiti); 6. Cap-Haïtien (Haiti); 7. Sherbrooke (Canada); 8. Lévis (Canada); 9. Saguenay (Canada); 10. Cayenne (French Guiana)

French America (French: Amérique française), sometimes called Franco-America, in contrast to Anglo-America, is the French-speaking community of people and their diaspora, notably those tracing back origins to New France, the early French colonization of the Americas. The Canadian province of Quebec is the centre of the community and is the point of origin of most of French America. It also includes communities in all provinces of Canada (especially in New Brunswick, where francophones are roughly one third of the population), Saint Pierre and Miquelon, Saint Martin, Saint Barthélemy, Martinique, Guadeloupe (which are all of them parts of France to this day), Saint Lucia and Haiti among North America and the Caribbean; and French Guiana in South America. Also there are minorities of French speakers in parts of the United States (New England (especially Maine) and Louisiana), the Dominican Republic, Dominica, Grenada and Trinidad and Tobago.

The Ordre des francophones d'Amérique is a decoration given in the name of the community to its members. It can also be described as the Francophonie of the Americas.

Since French is a Romance language, French America is sometimes considered to be part of Latin America, but this term more often refers to Ibero-America, or simply the Americas south of the United States.

== Countries, administrative divisions, and French possessions ==
This is a list of countries, administrative divisions, and French possessions in the Americas having the French language as an official language or where a French-based creole language is commonly spoken. The data of each place are based in the 2012–2013 census.

Place	Population	Area (km^{2}) (Note: Values listed in km².)	GDP (nominal)	GDP (nominal) per capita
Clipperton Island (France)	0	6	–	–
Dominica	72,660 (Note: The number of French speakers is unknown.)	750	$485 million	$7,860
French Guiana (France)	244,118	83,534		€15,416
Guadeloupe (France)	402,119 (Note: Figure without the territories of Saint Martin and Saint Barthélemy detached from Guadeloupe on 22 February 2007.)	1,628		€19,810
Haiti	9,996,731	27,750	$12.942 billion	$758
Martinique (France)	385,551	1,128		€21,527
New Brunswick (Canada)	747,101 (Note: Only 1/3 of the population are francophone.)	72,907	$31.974 billion	$47,443
Quebec (Canada)	8,164,361	1,542,056	$394.819 billion	$47,443
Saint Barthélemy (France)	9,279	25		
Saint Lucia	173,765	617	$1.239 billion	$7,769
Saint Martin (France)	35,594	53.2	$599 million	$21,921
Saint Pierre and Miquelon (France)	6,057	242	$215 million	€26,073
Total	20,237,336 (Note: Total population of the territories. Actual number of Francophones is lower.)	1,730,696		

== Members and corresponding diasporas ==
- French Canadians
  - Acadians
  - Québécois
  - Franco-Ontarian
  - Franco-Newfoundlander
- French Americans
  - New England French
  - Cajuns
  - French Louisianians
  - French Polynesian Americans
- African Diaspora
  - Africadians
  - French Caribbean
    - Haitians (diaspora)
    - French Guianese Creoles
  - Mounn koulè
    - Alabama Creole people
    - Arkansas Creoles
    - Ark-La-Tex Creoles
    - Cane River Creoles
    - Louisiana Creole people
      - St. Landry Parish Creoles
    - Mississippi Creoles

== See also ==
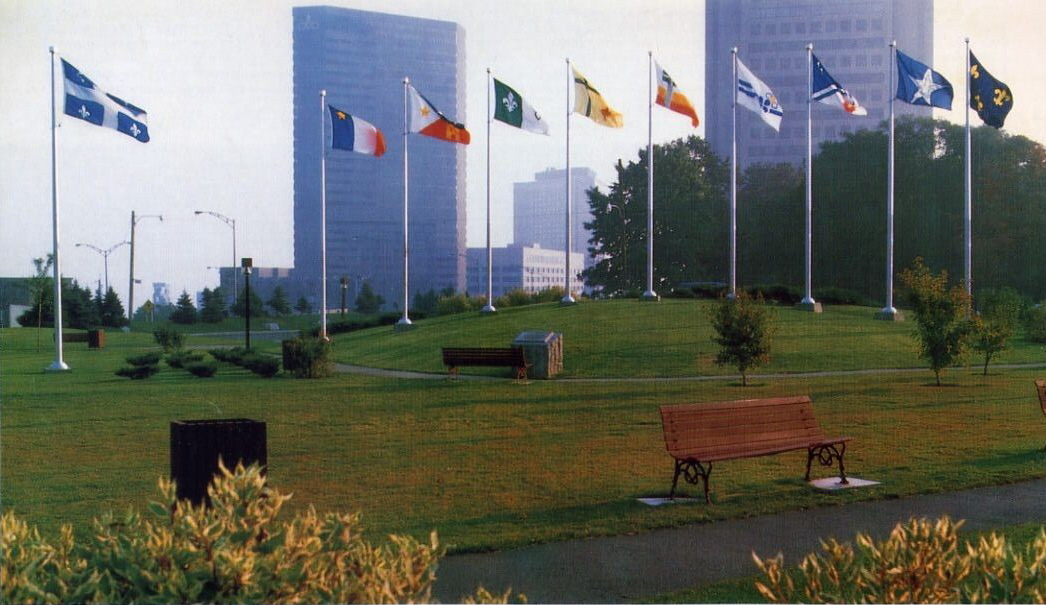
French flags of the Americas

- Francophone / Francophonie
- Franco-American relations
- French colonization of the Americas
- French colonial empire
  - Acadia
  - French Louisiana
- New France
  - Saint Pierre and Miquelon
  - Saint Martin
  - Saint Barthelemy
  - Guadeloupe
  - French Guiana
  - Clipperton Island
  - Martinique
- American French
- Caribbean Creoles (with French lexifiers)
  - Louisiana Creole
  - Haitian Creole
  - French Antillean Creole
- Louisiana
- French Caribbean
- French Canada (History of Quebec)
