= Aarts =

Aarts is a Dutch patronymic surname ("son of Aart"). Notable people with the surname include:

- Harry Aarts (1930–2020), Dutch politician
- Johannes Josephus Aarts (1871–1934), Dutch artist
- Kees Aarts (1941–2008), Dutch footballer
- Kees Aarts (born 1959), Dutch political scientist
- Maaike Aarts (born 1976), Dutch violinist
- Marcel Aarts (born 1983), Dutch basketball player
- Laura Aarts (born 1996), Dutch water polo player
- Ronald M. Aarts (born 1956), Dutch electrical engineer and physicist

Aarts (Mongolian аарц) is also a Mongolian dairy product.

== See also ==
- Aarts, a Dutch automobile brand
- Aerts (surname)
- Association of Advanced Rabbinical and Talmudic Schools (AARTS)
