= Van Aert =

Van Aert is a Dutch toponymic surname meaning "from Aert", whereby Aert and Aart are spelling variants of the toponym Aard (cf. aarde "earth") with the meaning "cultivated land, ground". Aert and Aart can also be reduced forms of the French male given name Arnout, which gives rise to the etymologically unrelated patronymic surnames Aerts and Aarts.

Notable people with the surname include:

- André van Aert (born 1940), Dutch racing cyclist
- Bernard Van Aert (born 1997), Indonesian road and track cyclist
- Jos van Aert (born 1962), Dutch racing cyclist
- Wout van Aert (born 1994), Belgian road and cyclo-cross racer

== See also ==
- Aert, a given name
- van Aarde, a surname
