= Aert =

- Gender: Male
- Language(s): Dutch

Aert is a Dutch short form of the given name Arnout (English Arnold). Notable people with the name include:

- Aert Anthoniszoon (1580–1620), Dutch marine painter
- Aert van den Bossche (15th century), Flemish renaissance painter
- Aert de Gelder (1645–1727), Dutch painter
- Aert van der Goes (1475–1545), Dutch lawyer
- Aert H. Kuipers (1919–2012), Dutch linguist
- Aert Jansz Marienhof (1626–1652), Dutch Golden Age painter
- Aert Mijtens (c.1541–1602), Flemish Renaissance painter
- Aert van der Neer (1603–1677), Dutch landscape painter
- Aert Jansse van Nes (1626–1693), Dutch naval commander
- Aert Pietersz (1550–1612), Dutch Golden Age painter
- Aert Schouman (1710–1792), Dutch painter
- Aert van Tricht (15th century–1550s), Dutch metal-caster
- Aert van Waes (1620–1675), Dutch Golden Age painter

== See also ==
- Aart
- Art (given name)
- Van Aert
