= Arnout =

- Gender: masculine

Other names
- Alternative spelling: Arnoud
- Variant forms: Aart, Aert, Arend, Arent, Arnaud, Arnaut, Arndt, Arne, Arno, Arnold, Arnoldus, Nol, Noud, Nout

Arnout or Arnoud is a Dutch language masculine given name equivalent to Arnold. Notable persons with that name include:

== Persons with the given name ==
- Arnout II, Count of Aarschot, 12th-century count of Aarschot, Flanders
- Arnout III, Count of Aarschot, 12th-century count of Aarschot, Flanders
- Arnout IV, 12th-century count of Aarschot, Flanders
- Arnoud van der Biesen (1899–1968), Dutch sailor
- Arnoud Boot (born 1960), Dutch economist
- Arnout Coninx (1548–1617), Flemish printer and bookseller
- Arnoud De Meyer, Belgian management academic
- Arnoud van Doorn (born 1966), Dutch politician
- Arnout Elsevier (1579–1656), Dutch painter
- Arnout van Eyndhouts or Arnoud de Lens (c. 1510–1582), Dutch humanist philosopher and poet
- Arnoud van Groen (born 1983), Dutch cyclist
- Arnoud van Halen (1673–1732), Dutch painter
- Arnoud Hendriks (born 1949), Dutch figure skater
- Arnout Hoekstra (born 1984), Dutch politician
- Arnout de Muyser (fl. 1575–1599), Flemish painter
- Arnoud Okken (born 1982), Dutch athlete
- Arnoud de Pret Roose de Calesberg, Belgian businessman
- Arnout Schuijff (born c. 1967), Dutch entrepreneur

== Persons with the surname ==
- Fernand Arnout (1899–1974), French weightlifter
- Peter Joseph Arnoudt (1811–1865), Belgian Jesuit writer

== See also ==
- Arnold (given name)
- Arnoldus
