= Arnoldus =

- Gender: masculine

Other names
- Variant forms: Arnold, Arnoud
- Related names: Arnaldus

Arnoldus is a given name. Notable persons with that name include:

- Arnoald (c. 550 – c. 611), Frankish bishop
- Arnoldus van Anthonissen (1631–1703), Dutch painter
- Arnoldus Arlenius (1510s–1582), Dutch humanist philosopher and poet
- Arnoldus Blignaut (born 1978), Zimbabwean cricketer
- Arnoldus Bloemers (1792–1844), Dutch painter
- Arnoldus Clapmarius (1574–1604), German academic, jurist and humanist
- Arnoldus Johannes Eymer (1803–1863), Dutch painter, draftsman, lithographer and watercolourist
- Arnoldus Hille (1829–1919), Norwegian bishop
- Arnoldus Montanus (1625–1683), Dutch teacher and author
- Arnoldus Vanderhorst (1748–1815), American militia leader

== See also ==
- Arnaldus
