= Aerts (surname) =

Aerts is a Dutch patronymic surname, a reduced form of the personal name Arnout, that is particularly common in Belgium. Notable people with the surname include:

- Alan Aerts (1956–2023), American powerlifting and bench press champion
- Conny Aerts (born 1966), Belgian astronomer
- Diederik Aerts (born 1974), Belgian theoretical physicist
- Egidius Aerts (1822–1853), Belgian flautist and composer
- Emile Aerts (1892–1953), Belgian track cyclist
- Firmin Aerts (born 1929), Belgian politician
- Hans Aerts (born 1958), Belgian composer
- Hendrick Aerts (c. 1570 – 1603), Flemish painter and draftsman
- Jean Aerts (1907–1992), Belgian road bicycle racer who specialized as a sprinter
- Jean-Marie Aerts (1951–2024), Belgian guitarist and producer
- Kathleen Aerts (born 1978), Belgian singer in Flemish girl group K3
- Katrien Aerts (born 1976), Belgian freestyle skier
- Lode Aerts (born 1959), Belgian bishop of Bruges
- Maikel Aerts (born 1976), Dutch football goalkeeper
- Mario Aerts (born 1974), Belgian road bicycle racer
- Nelly Aerts (born 1962), Belgian long-distance runner
- Nelson Aerts (born 1963), Brazilian tennis player
- Peter Aerts (born 1970), Dutch kickboxer and martial artist
- Philippe Aerts (born 1964), Belgian jazz double bassist
- Remieg Aerts (born 1957), Dutch historian
- Sara Aerts (born 1984), Belgian heptathlete
- Thijs Aerts (born 1996), Belgian racing cyclist
- Toon Aerts (born 1993), Belgian racing cyclist

== See also ==
- Aerts, Dutch automobile manufactured in 1899
- Aarts, surname
