= Théâtre de Paris =

Theatre in Paris, France

- Nouveau-Théâtre (1891–1918 ) Théâtre Réjane (1906–1918) Théâtre Moderne; Petit Théâtre de Paris
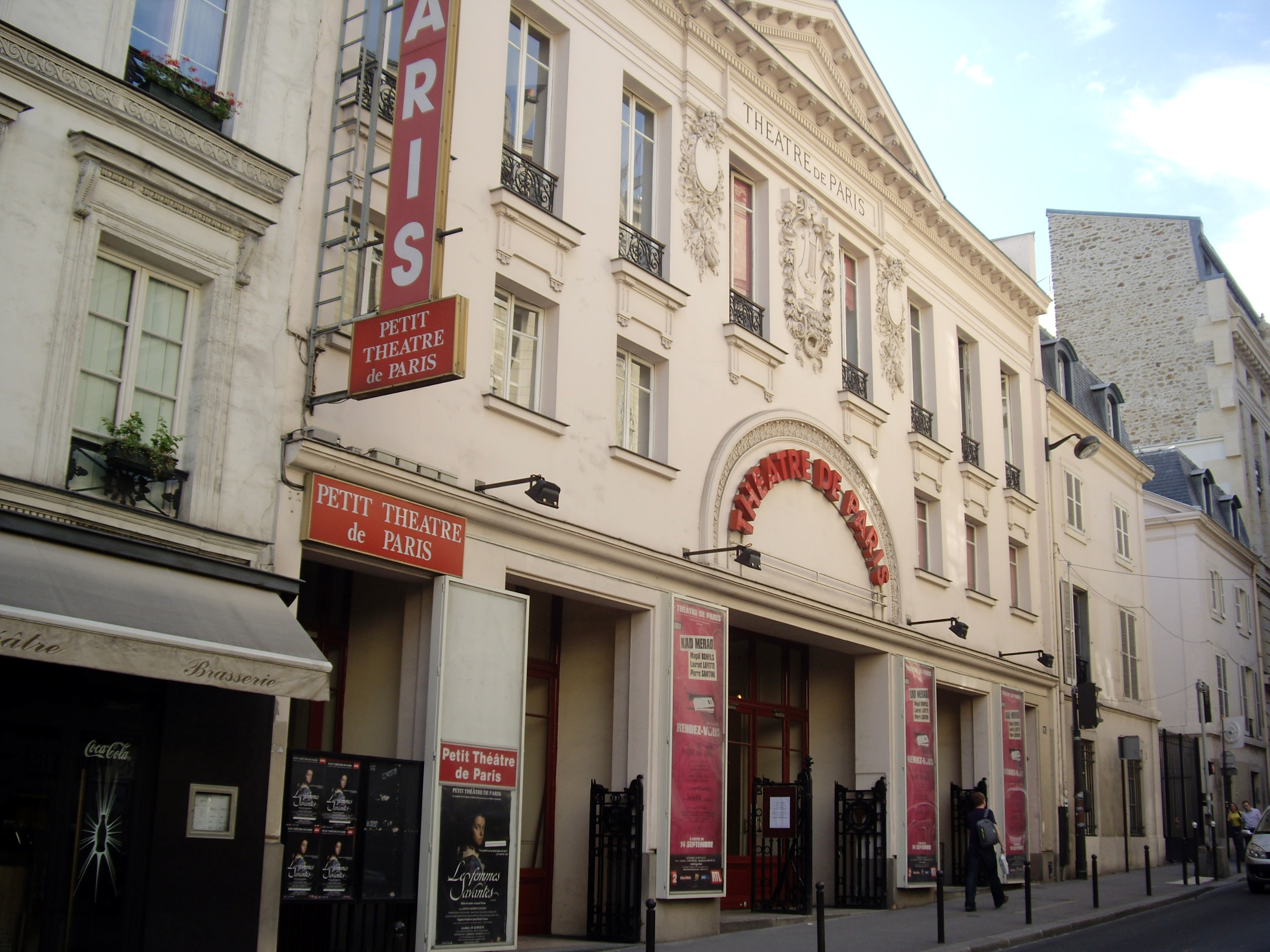
- Interactive map of Théâtre de Paris
- Address: 15 rue Blanche; Paris; France
- Coordinates: 48°52′43″N 02°19′53″E
- Capacity: 1,100 (plus 300)
- Type: theatre

Construction
- Opened: 1891

Website
- www.theatredeparis.com

The Théâtre de Paris (French pronunciation: [teɑtʁ də paʁi]) is a theatre located at 15, rue Blanche in the 9th arrondissement of Paris. It includes a second smaller venue, the Petit Théâtre de Paris.

== History ==
The first theatre on the site was built by the Duke of Richelieu in 1730. Baron Ogny bought it in 1779 and renamed it Folie-Richelieu. Then during the First Empire it was directed by Fortunée Hamelin, a celebrated member of the Merveilleuses ("marvelous women") of the Directoire era.

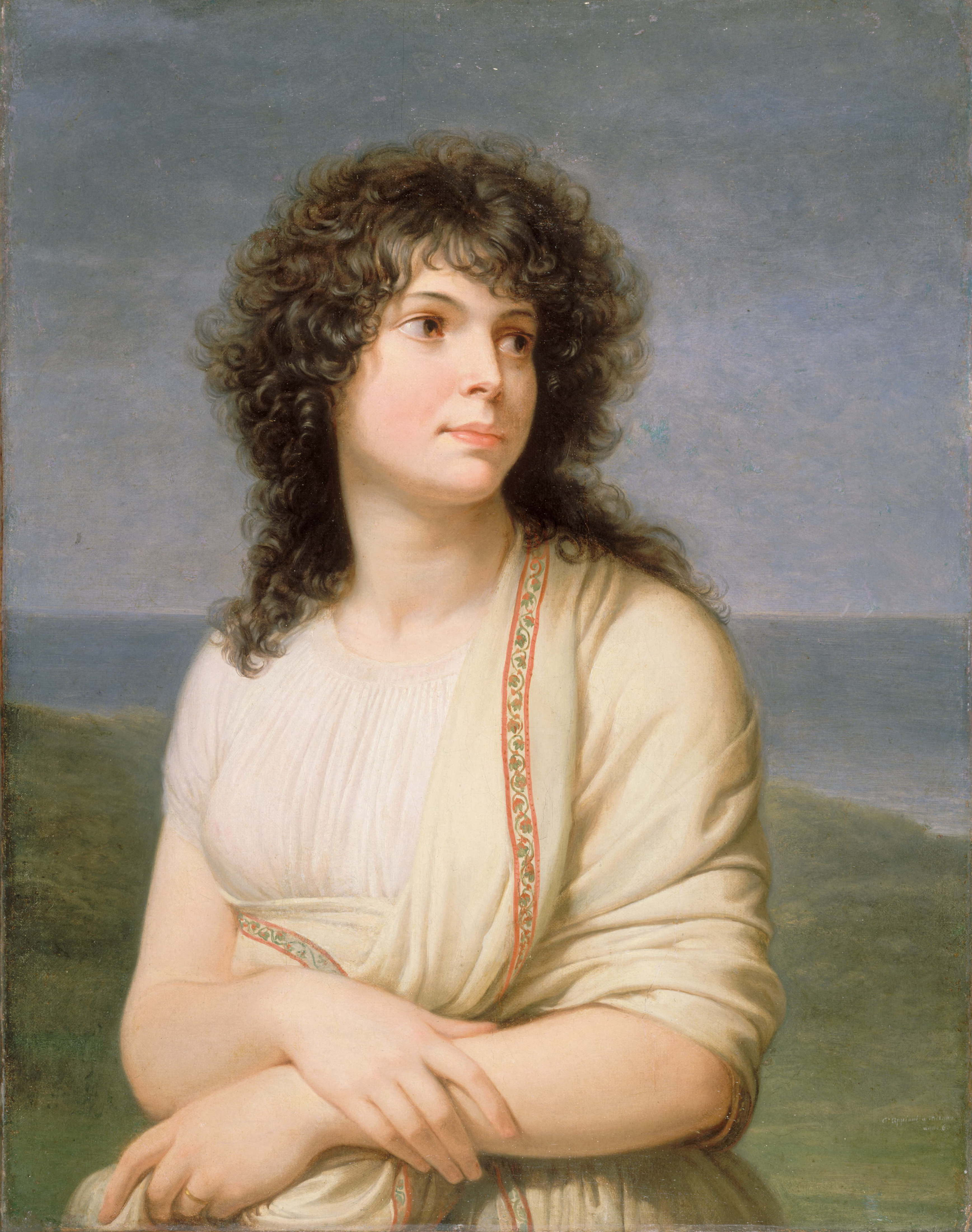
Fortunée Hamelin, first of a line of women to run the theatre. Painting by Andrea Appiani (1798)

In 1811, the Folie-Richelieu was transformed into a park, then demolished completely in 1851 in the redevelopment under Baron Haussmann. It became the site of the church of Sainte-Trinité de Paris with part of the site becoming a roller skating rink. In 1880, using plans by the architects Aimé Sauffroy and Ferdinand Grémailly, part of the rink became the Palace Théâtre and, after a further restoration in 1891 by Édouard Niermans, the Casino de Paris. After that, the rest of the rink, near the present rue Blanche, was demolished to make way for the Nouveau-Théâtre.

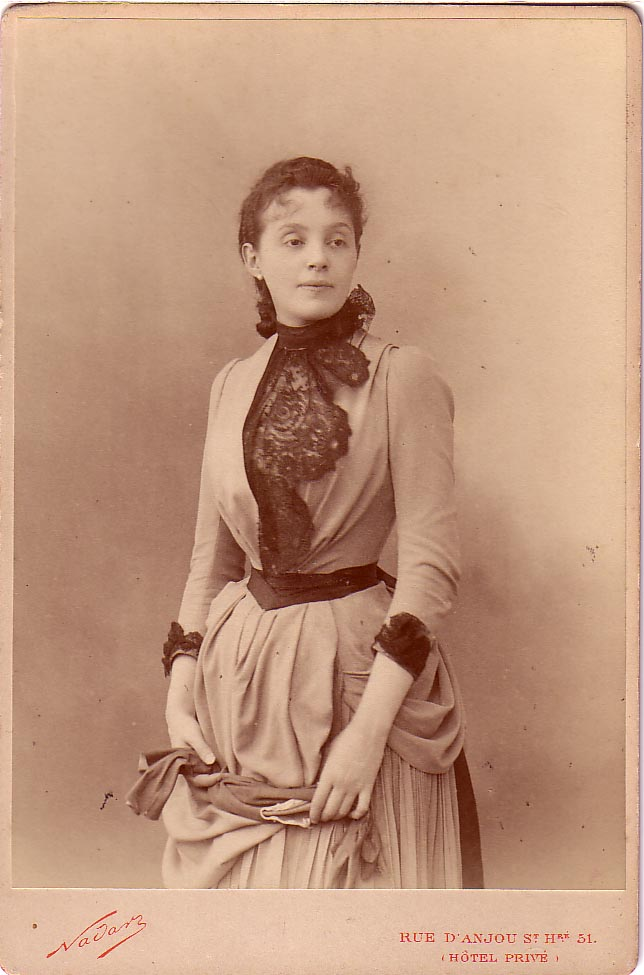
Gabrielle Réjane, photograph by Nadar

The first director of the Nouveau-Théâtre, was Aurélien Lugné-Poe, who, from 1888 to 1890, had been an actor in the Théâtre Libre company founded by André Antoine. After fulfilling four months of military service in early 1891, Lugné-Poe joined Paul Fort's eclectic Théâtre d'Art, which, from 1890 to 1892, presented poetry recitations, dramatic work by Marlowe, Shelley, and Hugo, as well as new plays by Rachilde, Paul Verlaine, and especially Maurice Maeterlinck (The Intruder, The Blind). When Fort left the enterprise at the start of 1893, Lugné-Poe assumed control, renamed it the Théâtre de l'Œuvre, and pursued aggressively Symbolist programming to rival Antoine's more Naturalistic offerings. Although Antoine had been the first to introduce Paris audiences to the modern drama of Henrik Ibsen (Ghosts, 1890; The Wild Duck, 1891), and Fort had produced The Lady from the Sea in 1892, starring Lugné-Poe as Wangel, it was Lugné-Poe who would make Ibsen his specialty in Paris theatre, premiering (and often starring in) nine Ibsen plays between 1893 and 1897.

== Lugné-Poe at the Nouveau-Théâtre ==
Like Paul Fort before him, Lugné-Poe never had a permanent theatre to serve as his company's home stage for the entire run of its initial art-theatre experiment. The Théâtre de l'Œuvre debuted with Maeterlinck's Pelléas et Mélisande for a single matinée performance at the Théâtre des Bouffes-Parisiens in May 1893, but the six engagements in his next season occurred at the distant Théâtre des Bouffes du Nord, where he premiered Ibsen's Rosmersholm, An Enemy of the People, and The Master Builder, Gerhart Hauptmann's Lonely Lives, and Bjørnstjerne Bjørnson's Beyond Human Power, among others. For the May 1894 production of Henri Bataille and Robert d'Humières' Sleeping Beauty, however, he secured Nouveau-Théâtre's space for the first time. Though he concluded the season with August Strindberg's Creditors at the newly built Comédie-Parisienne (later known as Louis Jouvet's Théâtre de l'Athénée), he quickly assumed the directorship of Nouveau-Théâtre for most of the 1894–95 season. There he premiered Maeterlinck's adaptation of John Ford's 'Tis Pity She's a Whore (Annabella), Beaubourg's The Mute Voice, Strindberg's The Father, Śūdraka's The Little Clay Cart, and Maeterlinck's Interieur, among others. While his May 1895 productions (including Ibsen's Little Eyolf) were staged at the Théâtre des Menus-Plaisirs, he returned to Nouveau-Théâtre to conclude the season with Ibsen's Brand.

The 1895–96 season found residence at two locations. Lugné-Poe staged the first half of the season back at the Comédie-Parisienne, with a line-up that included Thomas Otway's Venice Preserved, Kālidāsa's The Ring of Shakuntalā, and Oscar Wilde's Salome. The second half, however, starting in March 1896, began over two-years' residency for the Théâtre de l'Œuvre at Nouveau-Théâtre. Most notably, they premiered Ibsen's Pillars of Society (22-23 June 1896) and Peer Gynt (11-12 November 1896); Alfred Jarry's Ubu Roi (9-10 December 1896); Bjørnson's sequel to Beyond Human Power (25-26 January 1897); Hauptmann's fairy drama The Sunken Bell (4-5 March 1897); Bataille's Your Blood (7-8 May 1897); Ibsen's Love's Comedy (22-23 June 1897) and John Gabriel Borkman (8-9 November 1897); Nikolai Gogol's The Inspector General (7-8 January 1898); and Romain Rolland's Aert (2-3 May 1898) and The Wolves (18 May 1898). For their last season, the Théâtre de l'Œuvre gave two undistinguished premieres—Paul Sonniès' Fausta (15-16 May 1899) and Lucien Mayrargue's The Yoke (5-6 June 1899)—preferring to hold the much anticipated revival of An Enemy of the People at the grander Théâtre de la Renaissance in February. Lugné-Poe's last productions for the company were done at the very theatre where the Théâtre de l'Œuvre had begun in 1893 with Pelléas et Mélisande: the Théâtre des Bouffes-Parisiens. Lugné-Poe had successfully established the Nouveau-Théâtre as the site for daring, challenging, and at times outrageous modern drama.

== Réjane's Artistic Direction ==
In 1906, the actress Gabrielle Réjane bought the theater, renovated it and gave it a new name, the Théâtre Réjane. She produced among other works the French premiere of Maeterlinck's L'oiseau bleu in 1911 and successfully played her signature role of Madame Sans-Gêne by Victorien Sardou at the theatre.

The producer Léon Volterra bought the hall in 1918, and on 12 August 1919, he inaugurated the Théâtre de Paris, Réjane having stipulated in the sales contract that the theater could not retain her name. Volterra ran the theatre until 1948, when it was taken over by Marcel Karsenty and the comedian Pierre Dux. The actress and director Elvira Popescu took over in 1955 along with Hubert de Mallet, managing it for ten years, before she left to the Théâtre Marigny.

Under Alain de Leseleuc (1965–1975) and Robert Hossein (1975–1990) the theatre specialized in musical works, particularly Offenbach operettas and opéras-bouffes, such as La Périchole directed by Maurice Lehmann, La belle Hélène directed by Jérôme Savary, and Le pont des soupirs directed by Jean-Michel Ribes. It also produced musicals like Starmania and Cats.

Since January 2002, Stéphane Hillel has been artistic director of both theatres.

== Petit Théâtre de Paris ==
Elvira Popescu created a second venue with 300 seats, converted from costume workshops, which she first called the Théâtre Moderne before renaming it the Petit Théâtre de Paris. Today this second performance space bears the name "Salle Réjane."

== Premières and notable productions ==
=== Nouveau-Théâtre ===
- 1892: Rabelais, play by Oscar Méténier
- 1894: Nos bons chasseurs, vaudeville by Charles Lecocq, text by Paul Bilhaud and Michel Carré
- 1897: Brouillard du matin, play by Jacques Copeau
- 1906: Le Réformateur, play by Edouard Rod

(Notable premieres at Nouveau-Théâtre, presented by Lugné-Poe's Théâtre de l'Œuvre)

- 1894: Le Père, tragedy in three acts by August Strindberg
- 1895: The Little Clay Cart, drama in five acts by Śūdraka
- 1895: Intérieur by Maurice Maeterlinck
- 1895: Brand, play in five acts by Henrik Ibsen
- 1896: Les Soutiens de la Société, play in four acts by Henrik Ibsen
- 1896: Peer Gynt, drama in five acts by Henrik Ibsen
- 1896: Ubu Roi, drama in five acts by Alfred Jarry
- 1897: John Gabriel Borkman, drama in four acts by Henrik Ibsen

=== Théâtre Réjane ===
- 1908: Qui perd gagne, play by Pierre Véber
- 1911: L'Orfeo, opera by Claudio Monteverdi (first modern staged performance)

=== Théâtre de Paris ===
- 1929–1931: Trilogie marseillaise (first two parts: Marius and Fanny) by Marcel Pagnol, with Orane Demazis, Raimu and Pierre Fresnay
- 1948: Tovaritch by Jacques Deval, with Elvira Popesco
- 1956: Tea and Sympathy by Robert Anderson, with Ingrid Bergman
- 1961: 'Tis Pity She's a Whore by John Ford, directed by Luchino Visconti, with Romy Schneider and Alain Delon
- 1962: The Seagull by Anton Chekhov, directed by Sacha Pitoëff, with Romy Schneider
- 1967: Henri IV by Luigi Pirandello, directed by Sacha Pitoëff, with Claude Jade
- 1989: Cats by Andrew Lloyd Webber directed by Gillian Lynne, produced by Mel Howard
- 1993: Tailleur pour dames by Georges Feydeau, with Jean-Paul Belmondo
- 1998: Variations énigmatiques by Éric-Emmanuel Schmitt, with Alain Delon
- 1999: Les portes du ciel by Jacques Attali, with Gérard Depardieu
- 1999: One Flew Over the Cuckoo's Nest after the film by Miloš Forman, with Bernard Tapie
- 2000: Becket ou l'honneur de Dieu by Jean Anouilh, with Bernard Giraudeau
- 2001: Mrs. Doubtfire after the movie from Chris Columbus, with Michel Leeb
- 2005: Amadeus by Peter Shaffer, with Lorànt Deutsch and Jean Piat
- 2008: On Golden Pond by Ernest Thompson, with Jean Piat, Maria Pachomius and Béatrice Agenin
- 2011: Peter Pan by J. M. Barrie, director Irina Brook
