= Aart =

- Gender: Male
- Language(s): Dutch

Aart is a Dutch short form of the given name Arnout (English Arnold). Notable people with the name include:

- Aart Alblas (1918–1944), Dutch navy officer, resistance member
- Aart van Antum (1580–1620), Dutch marine painter
- Aart van Asperen (born 1956), Dutch television director
- Aart den Boer (1852–1941), Dutch architect and contractor
- Aart Brederode (1942–2020), Dutch field hockey player
- Aart van Dobbenburgh (1899–1988), Dutch graphic artist
- Aart Jansz Druyvesteyn (1577–1627), Dutch lawyer, painter, and mayor of Haarlem
- Aart de Geus (born 1954), Dutch-born American computer businessman
- Aart Jan de Geus (born 1955), Dutch politician and chairman of the Bertelsmann Foundation
- Aart van den IJssel (1922–1983), Dutch sculptor, painter and draftsman
- Aart Klein (1909–2001), Dutch photographer
- Aart Koopmans (1946–2007), Dutch businessman
- Aart van der Leeuw (1876–1931), Dutch writer
- Aart Malherbe (born c. 1930), South African Vice Admiral
- Aart Schouman (1710–1792), Dutch painter
- Aart Staartjes (1938–2020), Dutch actor, director, television presenter and documentary maker, "Mr. Aart" in the Dutch Sesame Street program
- Aart Vierhouten (born 1970), Dutch racing cyclist
- Aart van Wilgenburg (1902–1955), Dutch swimmer
