= Dongen =

- Municipality
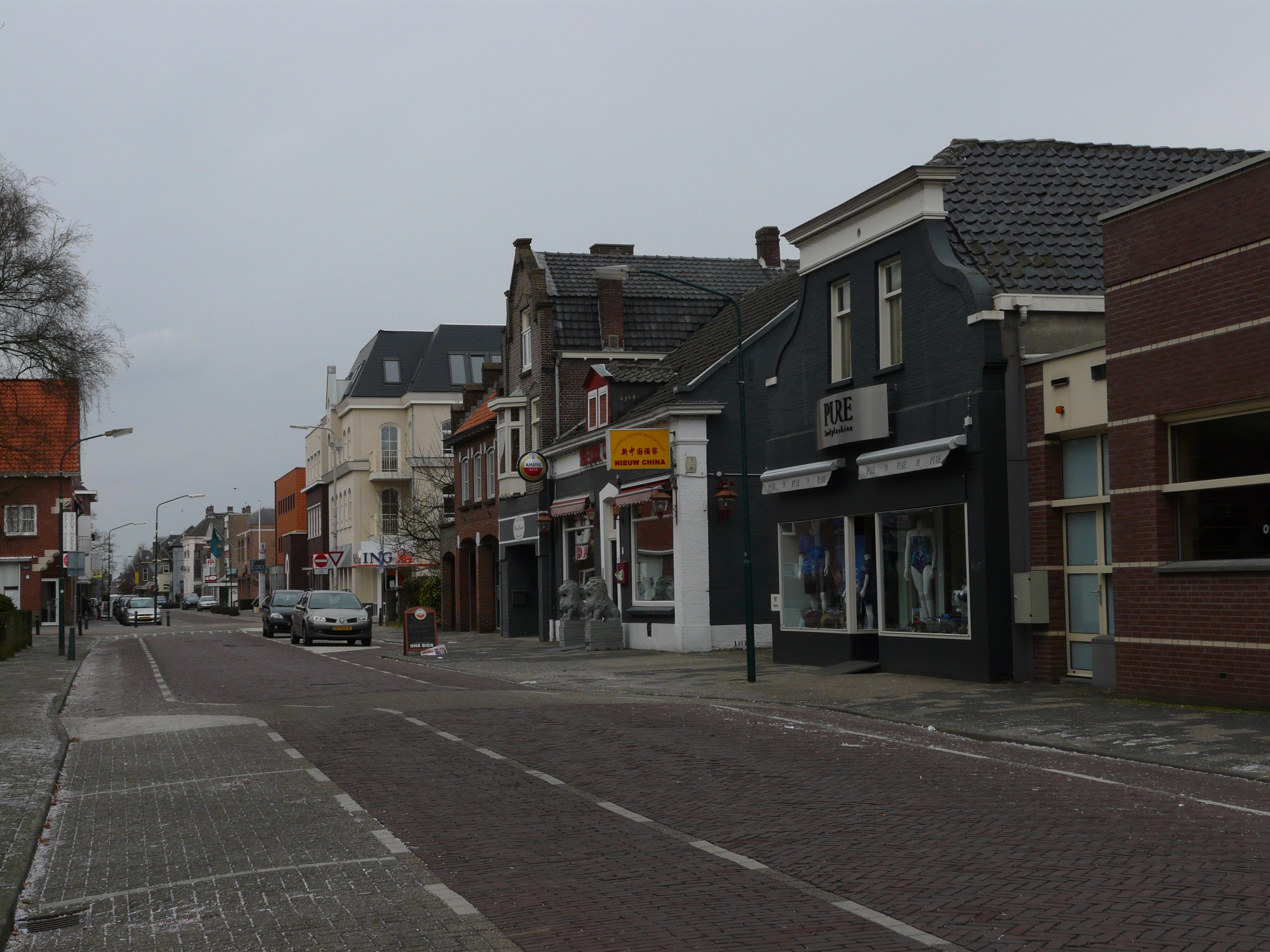
- Street through Dongen

- Flag Coat of arms

- Location in North Brabant
- Coordinates: 51°38′N 4°56′E
- Country: Netherlands
- Province: North Brabant

Government
  - Body: Municipal council
  - Mayor: Hans Slagboom (PvdA)

Area
  - Total: 29.74 km^{2} (11.48 sq mi)
  - Land: 29.24 km^{2} (11.29 sq mi)
  - Water: 0.50 km^{2} (0.19 sq mi)
- Elevation: 4 m (13 ft)

Population (January 2021)
  - Total: 26,368
  - Density: 902/km^{2} (2,340/sq mi)
- Demonym: Dongenaar
- Time zone: UTC+1 (CET)
  - Summer (DST): UTC+2 (CEST)
- Postcode: 5100–5109
- Area code: 0162
- Website: www.dongen.nl

Dongen (Dutch pronunciation: [ˈdɔŋə(n)]) is a municipality and village in North Brabant, in the southern Netherlands. It formerly had a profitable leather industry, and a few shoe factories in the town's older sections remain. The town is near a small river called the Donge, the water of which was used extensively for the leather industry. The Aerts automobile was built here in 1899.

== Population centres ==
- Dongen (population: 22,270)
- 's Gravenmoer (2,220)
- Vaart (500)
- Klein-Dongen (220)

=== Topography ===
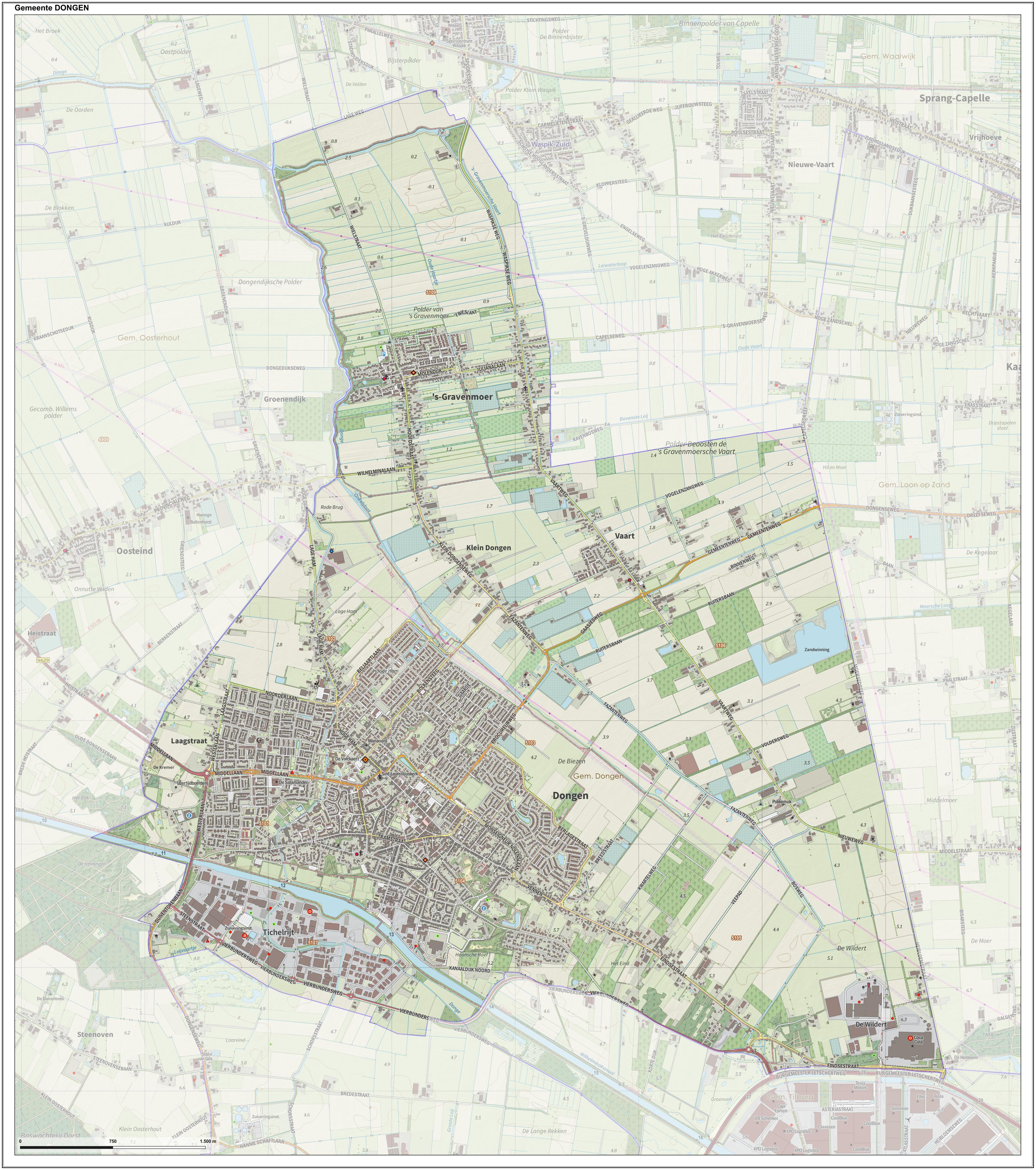

Map of the municipality of Dongen, June 2015

== Politics ==
The municipal council consists of 21 members. The composition of the council since 2002 is below:

Seats municipal council
| Party | 2002 | 2006 | 2010 | 2014 | 2018 | 2022 | 2026 |
| People's Party Dongen | 7 | 5 | 4 | 9 | 7 | 7 | 9 |
| CDA | 5 | 4 | 4 | 5 | 3 | 6 | 5 |
| D66 | - | - | - | - | 3 | 4 | 4 |
| VVD | 2 | 2 | 4 | 3 | 3 | 2 | 3 |
| Labour Party, (PvdA) | 3 | 4 | 2 | 3 | 3 | - | - |
| Democratic Podium | - | 2 | 3 | 1 | - | - | - |
| SP | 4 | 4 | 4 | - | - | - | - |
| Dongen Party for Elderly | - | - | - | - | 2 | 2 | - |
| Total | 21 | 21 | 21 | 21 | 21 | 21 | 21 |

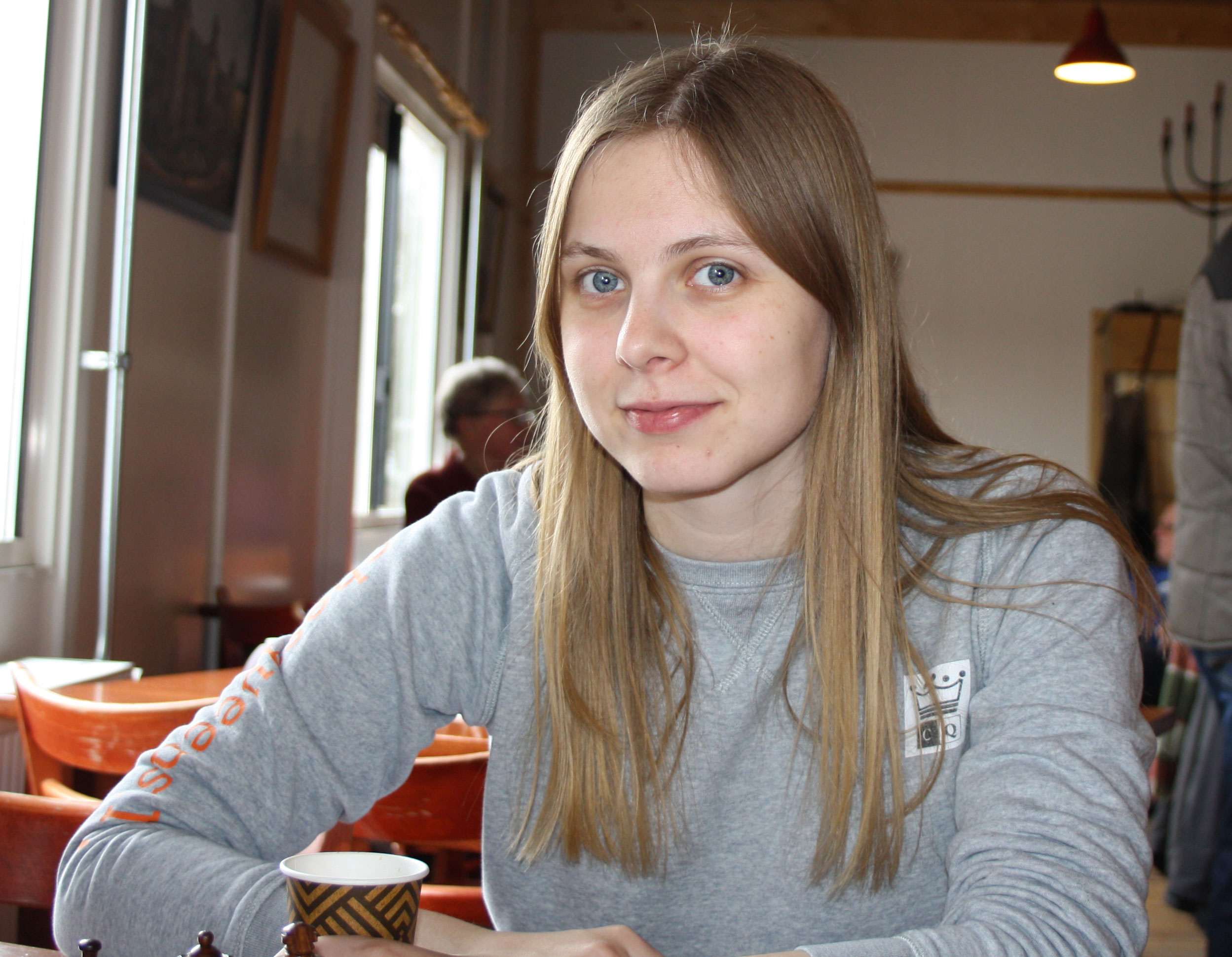
Anne Haast, 2018

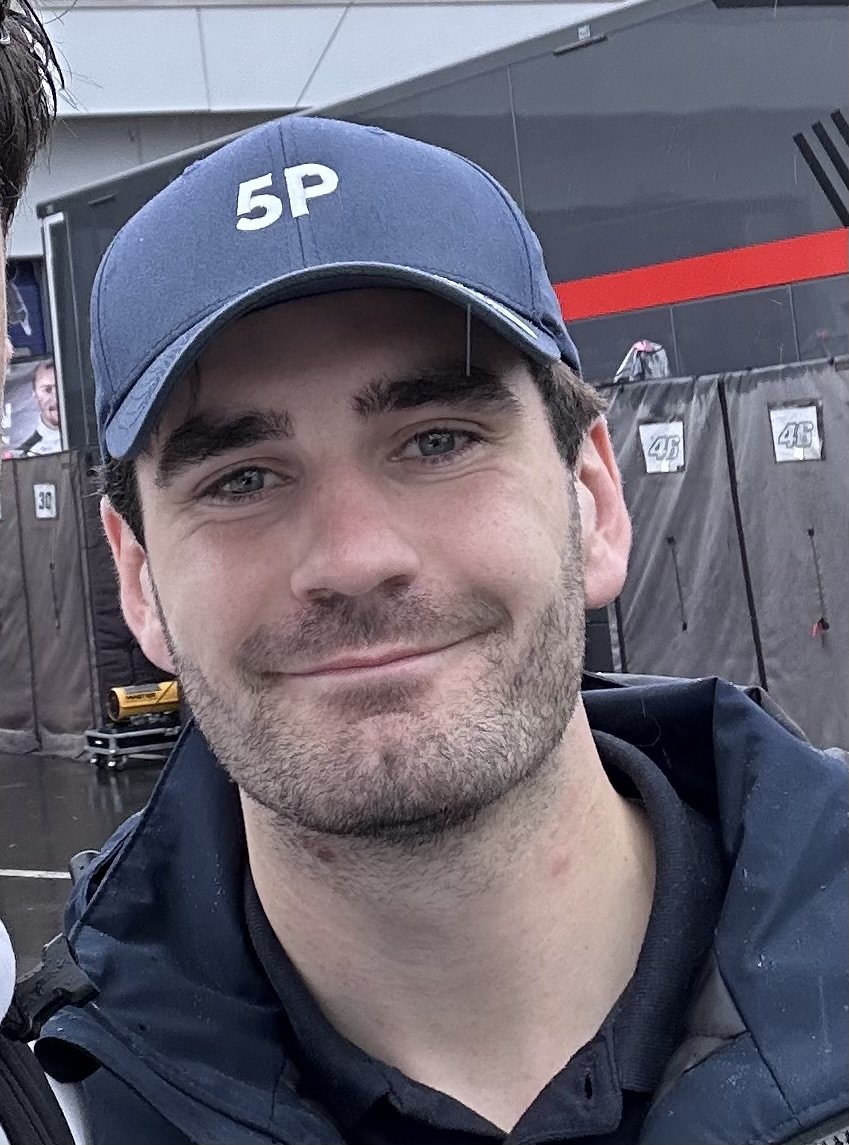
Job van Uitert, 2024

== Notable residents ==
- Theodorus Marinus Roest (1832–1898) a numismatist and conservator of the Teylers Museum
- Laurens van Kuik (1889 in 's Gravenmoer–1963) a teacher and then an autodidact painter.
- Karel Willemen (born 1967) a Dutch designer, contributed to the fantasy-themed amusement park Efteling
- Kelly van Zon (born 1987) a table tennis player
- Nadine Broersen (born 1990) a track-and-field athlete in the heptathlon and high jump
- Anne Haast (born 1993) chess player, Woman Grandmaster
- Job van Uitert (born 1998) racing driver
- Ward van der Harst (born 1988), Dutch EDM producer and DJ, half of W&W

== Gallery ==
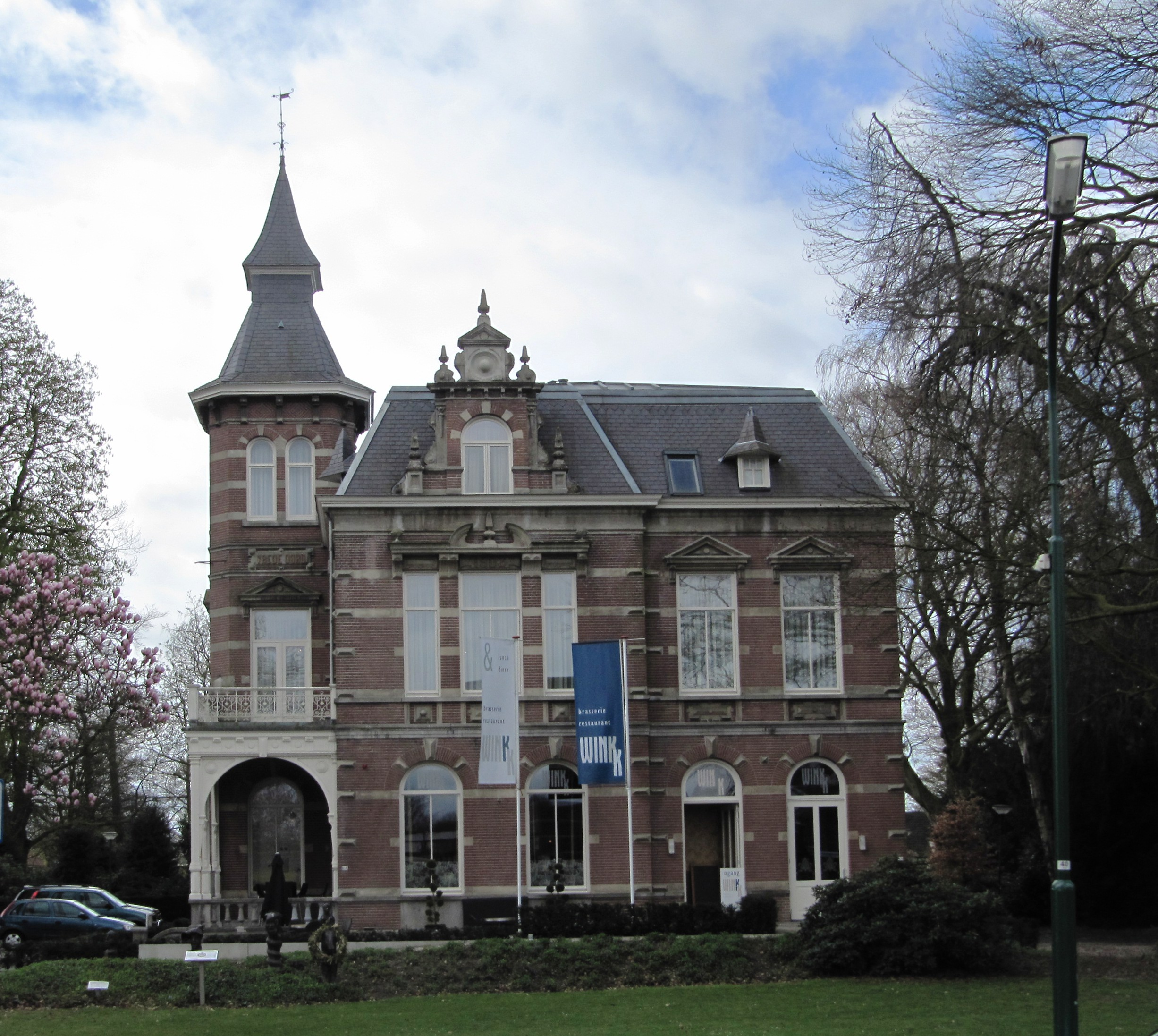
Dongen - Hoge Ham

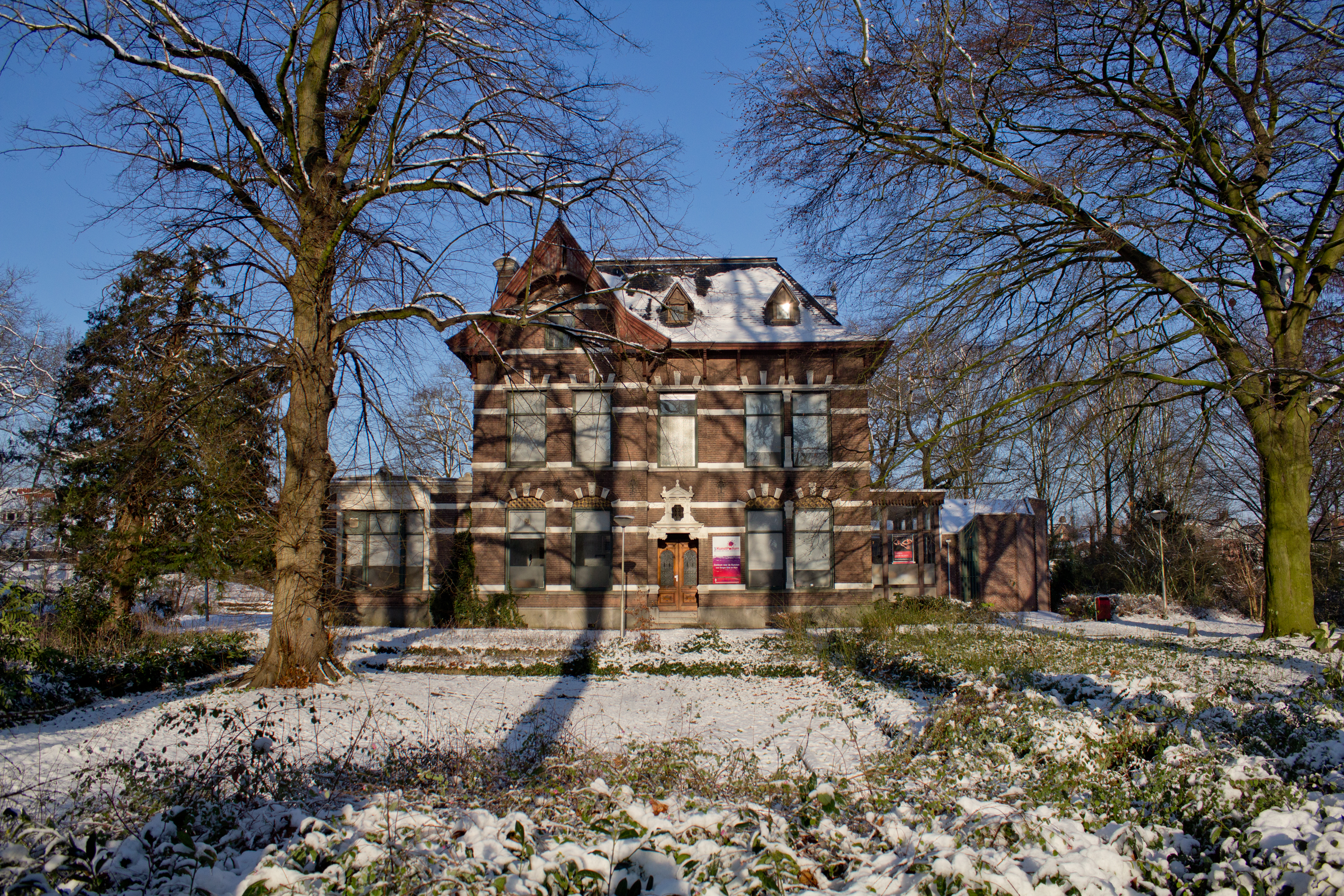
Dongen, Kerkstraat, Kunstpodium

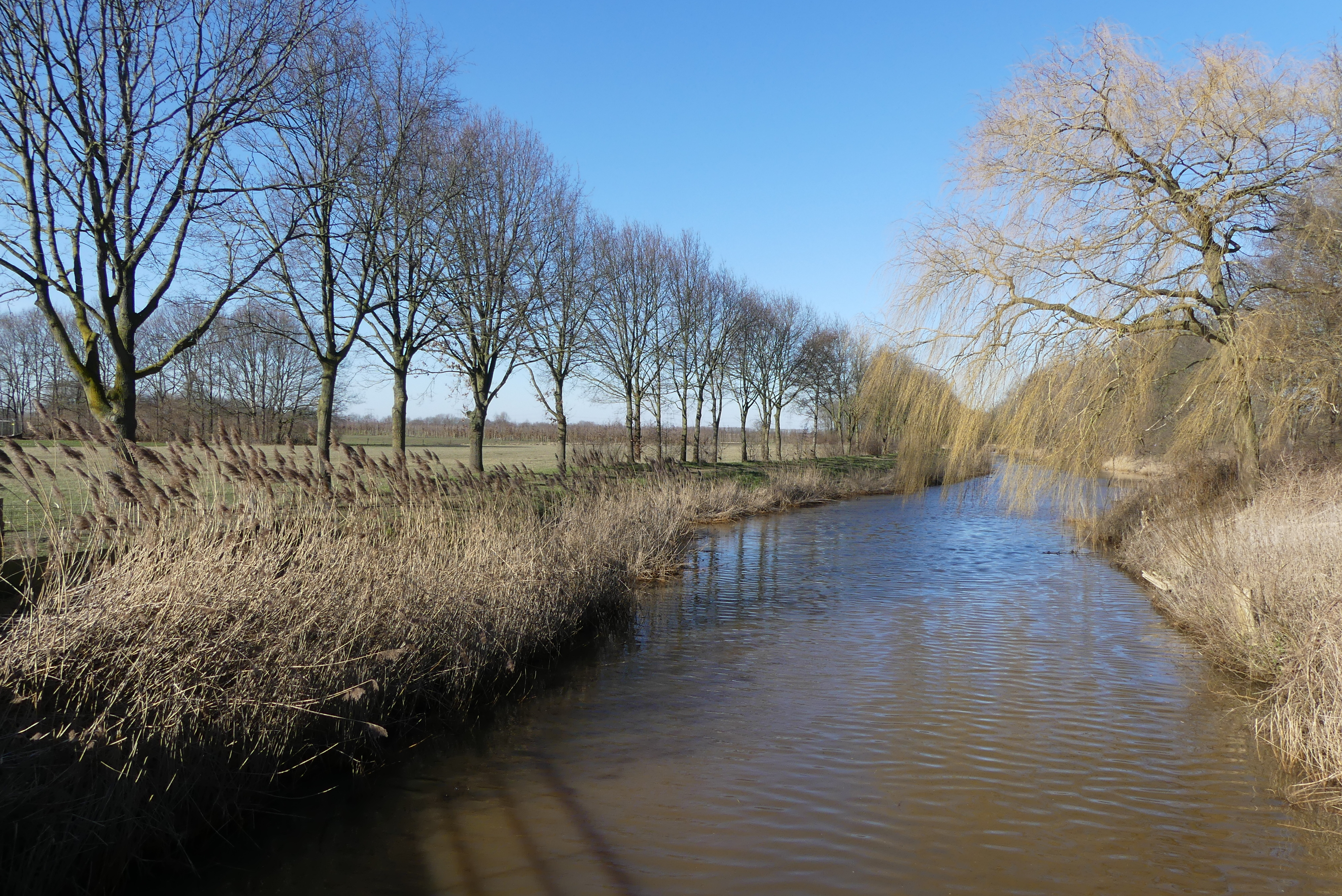
Donge River

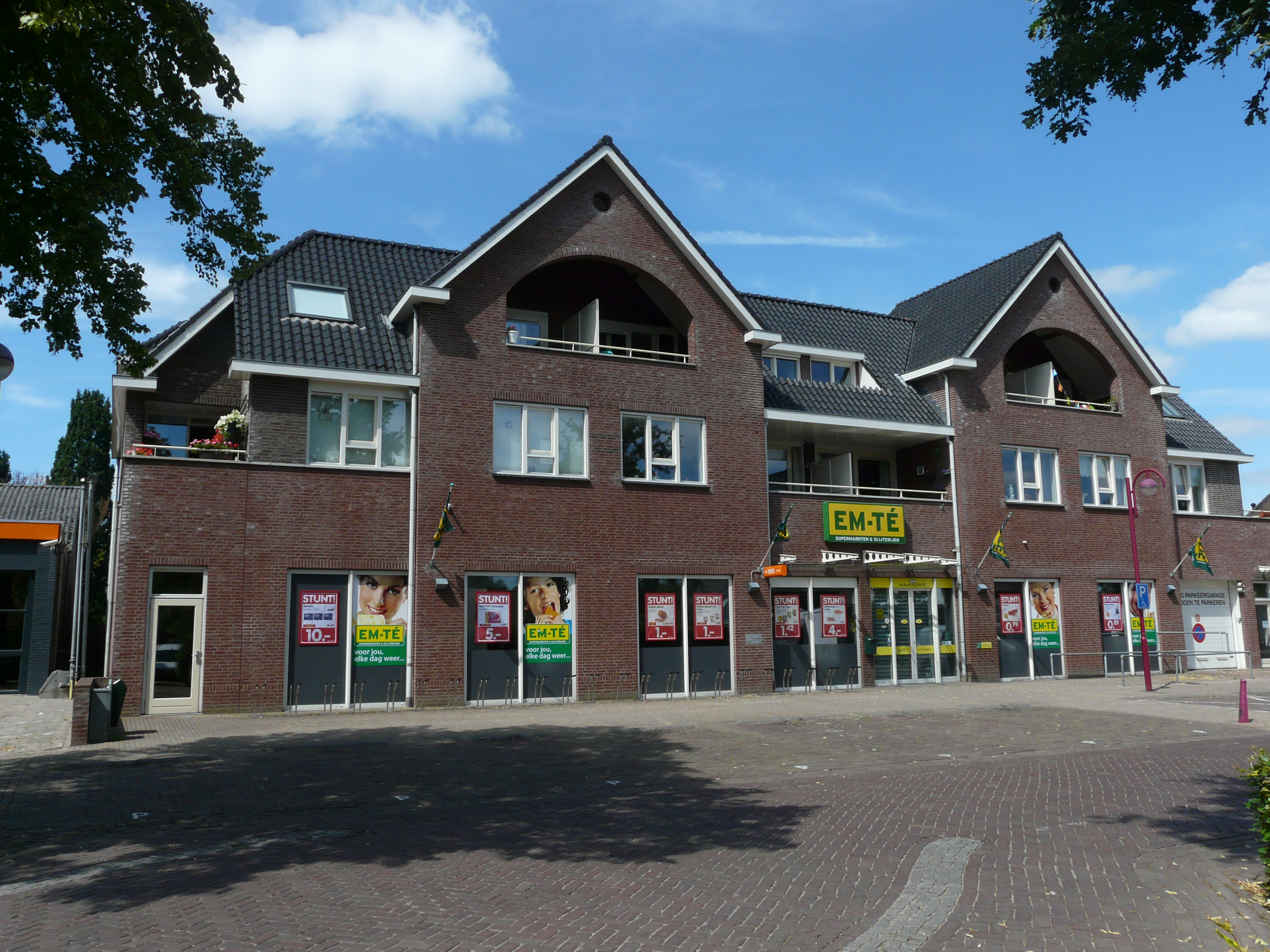
Supermarket in 's Gravenmoer
