= Muyser =

Muyser may refer to:

- Arnout de Muyser, painter of the second half of the sixteenth century
- Albert Demuyser (1920–2003), Belgian artist and racehorse owner
- Guy de Muyser (1926–2024), Luxembourgian diplomat and economist
