= Laurens van Kuik =

Dutch painter

Laurens van Kuik (4 April 1889 – 21 March 1963) was a Dutch artist who was born in 's Gravenmoer, the Netherlands.

He was a teacher before he started working in 1911 as an autodidact painter. In 1913, he became a teacher at the school in North Brabant, and went to live in Rotterdam. In 1917, he became one of the founders of the Rotterdam-based artistic movement known as "De Branding" ("The Wave"). Other members included Herman Bieling, Ger Ladage (or Gerwhl), Bernard Toon Gits, Jan Sirks, Wim Schmacher, Bernard Canter and Hendrik Chabot. Van Kuik's early works are to some extent influenced by cubism, tribal art, but also theosophy and anthroposophy.

He made a series of works, similar to futurism, inspired by the sounds and movements in the city of Rotterdam. In the years 1916–1918 he worked together with Bernard Toon Gits; Together they created "synthetic" or "synthetic–psychologic" portraits, from themselves and from each other. Van Kuik named his work of that period "transcendent realism". In 1918, he changed to producing a more figurative art. He made single pictures and started painting his well-known intense portraits and masks. These works are very similar to tribal art. Art critic Kasper Niehaus wrote: "If the negros would not only sculpt but also paint, They would probably do it in Laurens van Kuik's style." In 1927 he moved to Paris and later to The Hague and Amsterdam. In addition to "De Branding" van Kuik associated with "De Volstrekt Modernenen", "De Onafhankelijken", "De Anderen" and "De Sphinx".

His works include Sunflower (1924), Sound of Electricity (1927) and Head. His style has been compared with that of Janus de Winter, Theo van Doesburg and Louis Saalborn. His work was criticised by A. van der Chijs.

He died on 21 March 1963 at The Hague.
