= Hendrick van Anthonissen =

Dutch marine painter

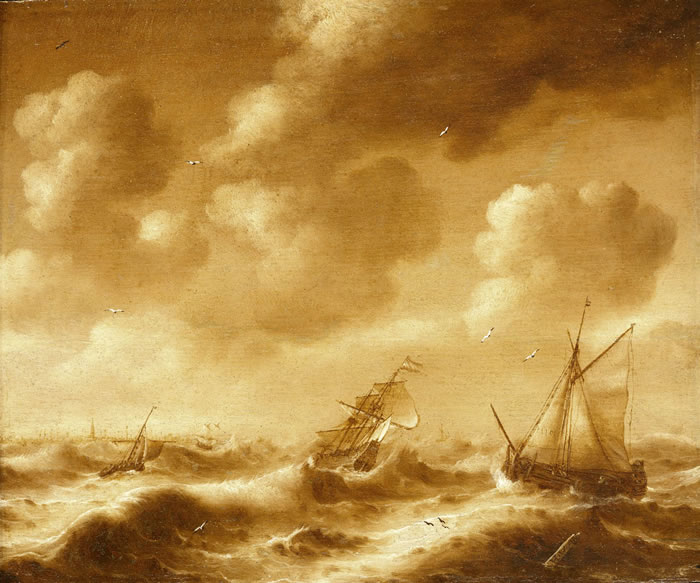
Shipping in a Gale, monochrome painting from ca. 1656, now in the National Maritime Museum.

Hendrick van Anthonissen (29 May 1605 - 12 November 1656) was a Dutch marine painter.

== Biography ==
Van Anthonissen was born and died in Amsterdam. He was the son of Aert Anthonisz (a.k.a. Aart van Antum) and painted in the style of his brother-in-law and teacher Jan Porcellis and of Jan van Goyen. He is the author of sea paintings in the Hermitage, St. Petersburg and the Prague Gallery, which through their signatures have been ascribed to a mythical Hendrik van Antem. In the 1630s he lived in The Hague, Leiden, and Leiderdorp, but from 1642 he was back in Amsterdam. He is known for beach scenes and seascapes in the manner of Jan Porcellis, sometimes in grisaille. He was the father of the marine painter Arnoldus van Anthonissen.

== Notable works ==
In 2014 one of Anthonissen's paintings View of Scheveningen Sands, which was painted in 1641, underwent conservation at the Fitzwilliam Museum in Cambridge. Restoration work uncovered a beached whale in the picture which had been obscured before 1873, when it was donated to the museum.

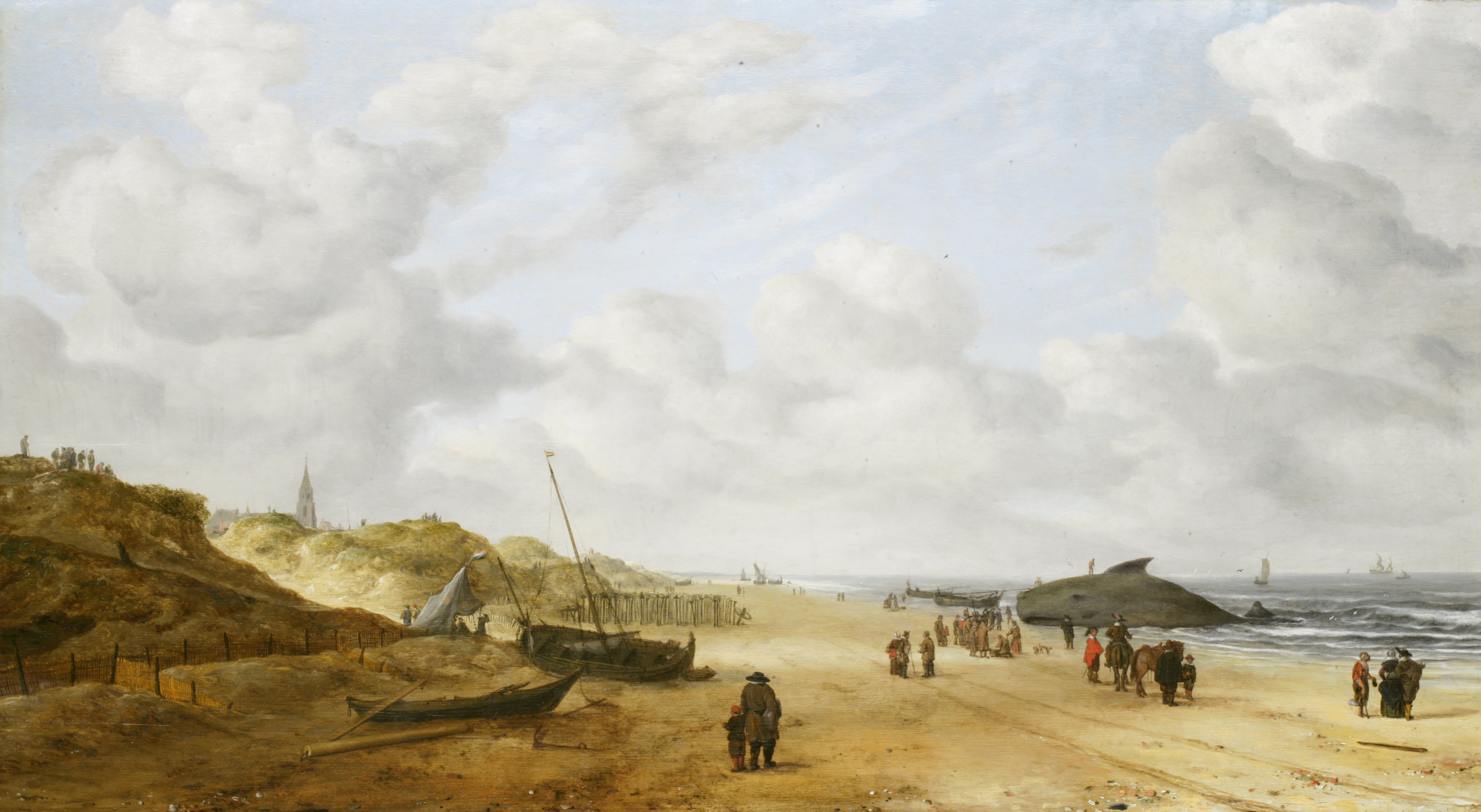
after restoration

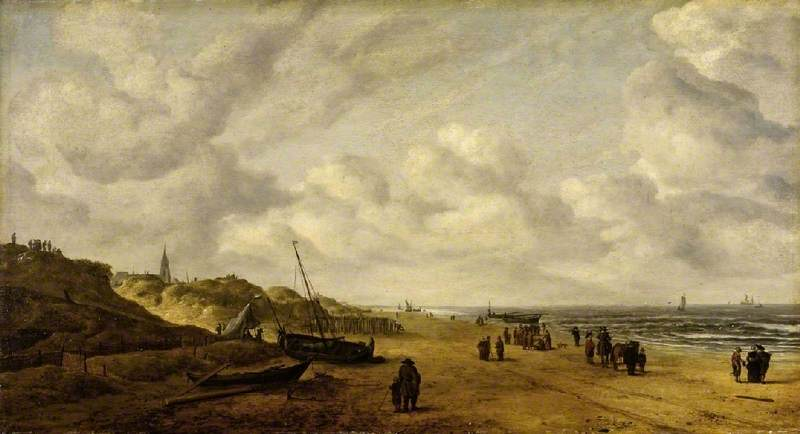
before restoration
