= Peter Joseph Arnoudt =

Belgian Jesuit priest (1811–1873)

The Reverend Father Peter Joseph Arnoudt SJ
- Born: 17 May 1811; Moere, Belgium
- Died: 29 July 1865 (aged 54); St. Louis, Missouri, U.S.
- Church: Catholic
- Ordained: 23 September 1843
- Writings: The Imitation of the Sacred Heart of Jesus

Peter Joseph Arnoudt, SJ (or Aernoudt, Arnold) (born at Moere, Belgium, 17 May 1811; died at Cincinnati, 29 July 1865) was a Belgian Jesuit priest and writer on devotional subjects.

== Early life ==
Arnoudt was born at Moere, in the Diocese of Bruges, Belgium, 11 May 1811.

== Jesuit formation and teaching ==
He entered the Society of Jesus at Florissant, Missouri, in 1831. After the usual course of Jesuit training, he was appointed to teach in the colleges in the Missouri province of the Society. While engaged in teaching, he proved himself to be a finished Greek scholar.

He taught at St. Charles College in Grand Coteau, Louisiana from 1839 to 1841.

== Works ==
He composed in Latin the De Imitatione Sacri Cordis Jesu. It was written to promote devotion to the Sacred Heart of Jesus, in fulfilment of a vow he had made in a time of illness. He sent the manuscript to Rome in 1846, and ten years later it was approved by Father General Roothaan. The work was published on the Benzinger press at Einsiedeln, 1863. It was translated into English by Joseph Fastre and published at Cincinnati in 1865. Translations were also made into French, German, Spanish, Portuguese, Italian, Flemish, and Hungarian. The French translation, published at Besançon, passed through eighteen editions between the years 1864 to 1887. Sommervogel gives the titles of two English, two Flemish, and four French versions of Arnoudt's work.

According to Pierre-Jean De Smet, Arnoudt left at his death the following manuscripts:

- a Greek epic poem of about 1,200 verses
- a collection of Greek odes
- a Greek grammar
- The Glories of Jesus, an ascetical work
- The Delight of the Sacred Heart of Jesus, an ascetical work
- The Abode of the Sacred Heart, a collection of spiritual retreats

== Bibliography ==
- Vanderspeeten, Notice biographique sur le P. Pierre Arnoudt, de la c. de J. (Tournay, 1873);
- De Smet in Précis historiques (1866).
- In the London ed. of The Imitation of the Sacred Heart (1867) and the Tournay ed. (1872) are published notices of the author by Russell and Van den Hofstadt respectively.

Arnoudt's relatives in Belgium have preserved forty-six of his autograph letters.
