= Arnoldus van Anthonissen =

Dutch painter

Arnoldus van Anthonissen (1631, Amsterdam – 1703, Zierikzee), was a Dutch Golden Age marine painter.

== Biography ==
According to the Rijksbureau voor Kunsthistorische Documentatie (RKD) he was the son of the marine painter Hendrick van Anthonissen, and the grandson of marine painter Aert Anthonisz a.k.a. Aart van Antum. He moved to Leiden in 1660 became a member of the Leiden Guild of St. Luke in 1662. In 1663, he moved to Zierikzee and became a member of the Guild of St. Luke in Middelburg during the years 1665-1669. He is known for seascapes and maps of Schouwen and Duiveland.
