= Nol =

Nol may refer to:

== Surname ==
- Koen van Nol (born 1974), Dutch judoka

== Given name ==
- Nol Havens (born 1959), lead singer of band The Art Company
- Nol Maassen (1922–2009), Dutch politician
- Nol de Ruiter (born 1940), Dutch football coach and former player
- Lon Nol (1913–1985), Cambodian politician and general who served as Prime Minister of Cambodia

== Localities ==
- Nol, Sweden

== Other ==
- Nol Card, a smart card for public transport in Dubai, United Arab Emirates
- Népszabadság, a Hungarian newspaper with the website nol.hu
- Nol (Russian: Ноль, lit. zero), Russian rock band
- Nol Universe, South Korean company

== See also ==
- NOL (disambiguation)
- NOLS (disambiguation)
