= NOLS =

NOLS may refer to:

- National Outdoor Leadership School, United States, a wilderness education institution
- National Organisation of Labour Students, United Kingdom, now known simply as Labour Students

== See also ==
- NOL (disambiguation)
