= Arnoud de Pret Roose de Calesberg =

Belgian businessman

Arnoud, Count de Pret Roose de Calesberg is a Belgian noble businessman. He is a member of board of the international brewery InBev, Delhaize, Umicore and of Euronext-NYSE.

== Family ==
Arnoud de Pret Roose de Calesberg is a descendant of Jacques I de Pret, (1643–1703) grand almoner of Antwerp. and related to count Philippe de Pret Roose. He is the grandson of a member of the house of de Spoelberch, an old Belgian noble house, they are titled Viscount de Spoelberch. The house of Spoelberch is one of the three Belgian families to hold assets in Anheuser-Busch InBev. Arnoud de Pret Roose de Calesberg sits at the board of the giant beverage producer mainly to protect his family's assets.

== Career ==
Arnoud de Pret Roose de Calesberg graduated as commercial engineer at the Louvain School of Management (University of Louvain – UCLouvain). He started his career in 1971 as credit officer at Morgan Guaranty Trust Company. From 1972 to 1978, he was corporate account manager at the Morgan Guaranty Trust Company of New York. In 1981, he became the treasurer of Belgian steel company Cockerill-Sambre. From 1981 to 1990, he was treasurer and then as Chief Financial Manager for UCB.

From 1991 until May 2000, he was Chief Financial Officer and a member of the board of directors and financial director of Umicore. Since 1990, he is also the Treasurer and Corporate Finance Manager at Société Générale de Belgique.

== Other mandates ==
- 2015 – 12 May 2016: Vice Chairman of The Supervisory Board at Euronext
- 1 July 2007 – 12 May 2016: Independent Member of Supervisory Board at Euronext
- 2005 – 30 April 2015: Director at UCB
- 10 May 2000 – April 2015: Non-Executive Director of Umicore S.A.
- May 2002 – 26 May 2011: Independent Director of Louis Delhaize Group
- Since 1990: Director of Anheuser-Busch InBev
