= Herman Bieling =

Dutch painter

Herman Frederik Bieling (21 June 1887 in Rotterdam – 5 December 1964 in Rhoon) was a Dutch painter, sculptor, graphic artist and Modern Art propagandist.

Bieling was a Dutch artist who worked in the Rotterdam area. He produced a large ouvre of paintings, sculpture and prints. HB was particularly noted for his use of "Bieling Blue" a vivid dark blue. In 1917 Bieling founded an artistic group called De Branding (The Surf or The Breakers in Dutch). Other members included Laurens van Kuik, Ger ladage (aka Gerwhl), Bernard Toon Gits, Jan Sirks and Wim Schmacher. Their aim was to exhibit and promote the new modern art in the Netherlands. They had many links with other art groups including De Stijl and Der Sturm. Bieling organized many modern art shows. These shows included paintings by himself and many modern artists including Otto Gleichmann, Kurt Schwitters, Constantin Brâncuși, and Piet Mondriaan.

Bieling's work was included in the 1939 exhibition and sale Onze Kunst van Heden (Our Art of Today) at the Rijksmuseum in Amsterdam.

== List of Shows ==
- 1917 Leonard Hutton Galleries, NY ( with Kees van Dongen)
- 1921 Rotterdamsche Kunstkring, Rotterdam
- 1922 Kestneregesellschaft, Hannover
- 1925 Kunstzaal Van Hasselt, Rotterdam
- 1931 Rotterdamsche Kunstkring
- 1936 Kunstzaal Van Lier, Amsterdam
- 1955 Kunstatelier de Stroom, Rotterdam
- 1958 Haagse Kunstkring, Den Haag
- 1967 Kuntstzaal Van Lier, Veere
- 1968 Galerie De Sfinx, Amsterdam
- 1975 Vrije University, Amsterdam
- 1979 Kunsthandel Borzo, Den Bosch
- 1988 Kunsthandel Smelik & Stokking, Denn Haag
- 2003 Kasteel van Rhoon, Albrandswaard
