= Entrop =

The Entrop was a Dutch bicyle and car manufacturer, founded 1909 in 's Gravenmoer. The firm produced over 1500 bicycles, and only four cars.

The car was powered by an air-cooled engine mounted behind the single front wheel. It weighed 400 kg (880 lb), and used lever steering. There were two engines available: a single-cylinder 417 cc engine, and a two-cylinder 813 cc engine.
