= Ronald Aarts =

Dutch electrical engineer and physicist (born 1956)

Ronald M. Aarts (born 1956) is a Dutch electrical engineer and physicist, inventor and professor in the field of electroacoustics and in biomedical signal processing technology.

== Biography ==
Ronald M. Aarts received a BSc degree in electrical engineering in 1977 and a PhD in physics from Delft University of Technology in 1995. He joined the Optics group at Philips Research Laboratories (formerly known as the Natlab), Eindhoven, Netherlands, in 1977. His research initially involved servo systems and signal processing for use in both Video Longplay players and compact disc players. In 1984 he joined the Acoustics Group at Philips working on developing CAD tools and signal processing for loudspeaker systems. In 1994 he became a member of the Digital Signal Processing (DSP) group at Philips and has led projects on the improvement of sound reproduction by exploiting DSP and psychoacoustic phenomena.

In 2003 he became a Philips Fellow and extended his interests in engineering to medicine and biology, in particular sensors and their signal processing for ambulatory monitoring, sleep, cardiology, perinatology, drug response monitoring (DRM) systems, and epilepsy detection. He is the author or co-author of more than 450 published papers and reports and has been credited with more than 250 patent applications, including more than 175 U.S. (more than 100 of which were granted). For his creative contributions at Philips, he received the company's Gilles Holst Award (1999), the Gold Invention Award (2012) and the Diamond Invention Award (2018).

He became an IEEE Fellow in 2007 and receiving their Chester Sall Award in 2017 and in 1998 he became an Audio Engineering Society Fellow and was awarded their silver medal in 2010. He was also co-organizer and chairman of several international conventions.

He was a member of the Board of Trustees ("Kuratorium") of the Fraunhofer Institute for Digital Media Technology IDMT at Ilmenau from January 2005 to February 2013.

Aarts has been a part-time professor at Eindhoven University of Technology (TU/e) since 2006, where he mainly supervises Master and PhD students. Since 1990 he has been president of the Aarts Consultancy. In 2019, he retired from Philips and now focuses mainly on his academic and consultancy work, the latter encompassing both technical and intellectual property (IP) advice.

He married Doortje Ultee (1956-2009) in Krommenie on 14 September 1978. The couple has two sons.

One of Aarts’ quotes is: "I’m an advocate for the four P’s: People (Cooperations), Patents (Engineering), Papers (Science), and Products (Valorization). Those four P’s have been keeping me ticking for over 40 years."

== Professional work ==
=== Bass sound enhancement ===
Aarts and his collaborators at Philips have been involved in the development, improvement, and hardware implementation of bass enhancement/restoration systems exploiting the natural psycho-acoustic phenomenon known as the "missing fundamental". Small loudspeakers are in general not capable of reproducing low-frequency notes, but by exploiting auditory illusions one can use either the virtual pitch phenomenon to shift the low frequencies to a higher frequency band where the loudspeakers are capable, this is sometimes referred to as Ultra Bass; or, one can map the very low frequency to one single frequency where the loudspeaker is designed for high efficiency, this is sometimes referred to as Bary Bass. On the other hand, if the loudspeaker is capable of radiating low frequencies, but if they are not present in the music, those frequencies can be derived from the music using a bandwidth extension scheme, this is sometimes referred to as Infra Bass. Finally, the audio quality, especially from high Q low-frequency sound transducers, can be improved by attenuating decay parts of bass signals thereby reducing sustain or ringing for bass notes, this is sometimes referred to as punchy bass.

=== Loudspeaker arrays and their radiation ===
Aarts and his coworkers at Philips have also been involved in the design and applications of loudspeaker radiation. An extended version of the Zernike polynomials, known as ENZ, was applied to solve forward and inverse problems in acoustic radiation of a flexible circular piston surrounded by a rigid infinite plane (baffle) and of a flexible spherical cap on a rigid sphere, showing that the latter is quite similar to that of a real loudspeaker. The use of several loudspeakers arranged in an array allows special radiation characteristics. For example, one can increase the sweet spot area during stereophonic listening by making use of interaural time differences, this system was called position-independent stereo. Another application is to direct the sound to a listener without disturbing others, this is known as personal sound. Yet another application is to use quadratic phase arrays to design loudspeaker arrays that radiate just like a single loudspeaker. For loudspeaker radiation calculations the Struve function is often needed, simple approximations have been derived for this.

=== Stereo base widening ===
On small TVs and portable audio equipment, the speakers are close together. With special signal processing, so-called phantom or virtual sources can be made so that the sound seems to be generated far outside the loudspeakers. This principle has been applied by Philips to many TV and audio sets, under the commercial name 'Incredible sound'. The director Spike Lee made a commercial for this in 1996, which was set on Wall Street in NYC.

=== Acoustic cooling with loudspeakers ===
A small loudspeaker in a special housing can generate synthetic jets that offer advantages over a fan, such as higher efficiency, greater design freedom, and less noise and wear. Experiments have shown that for small surfaces up to approximately 40 cm^{2}, the synthetic jets cool better and make less noise than a fan.

=== Ambulatory or unimpeded patient monitoring ===
Monitoring of, e.g., epilepsy, sleep, and heart problems such as atrial fibrillation; and vital signs such as blood pressure, heart rate, and respiratory rate, can be performed without hindering the patient using a photoplethysmogram (PPG). A PPG sensor can easily be built into a bracelet such as a sports watch, preferably extended with accelerometers.

== Publications ==
A list of published articles and US-patents can be found on the homepage of Ronald M. Aarts.
