= Arnoldus Johannes Eymer =

Dutch painter (1803–1863)

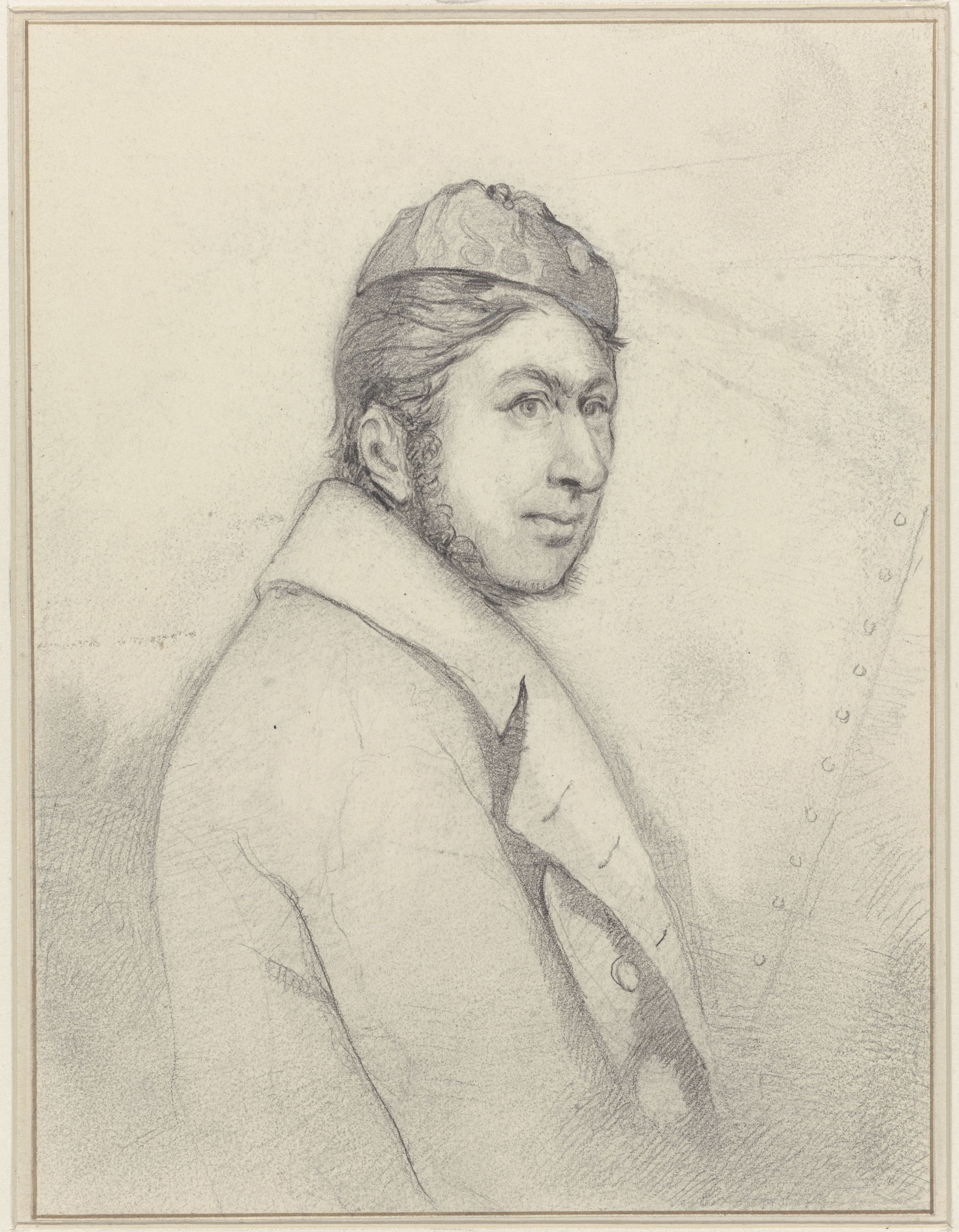
Arnoldus Johannes Eymer

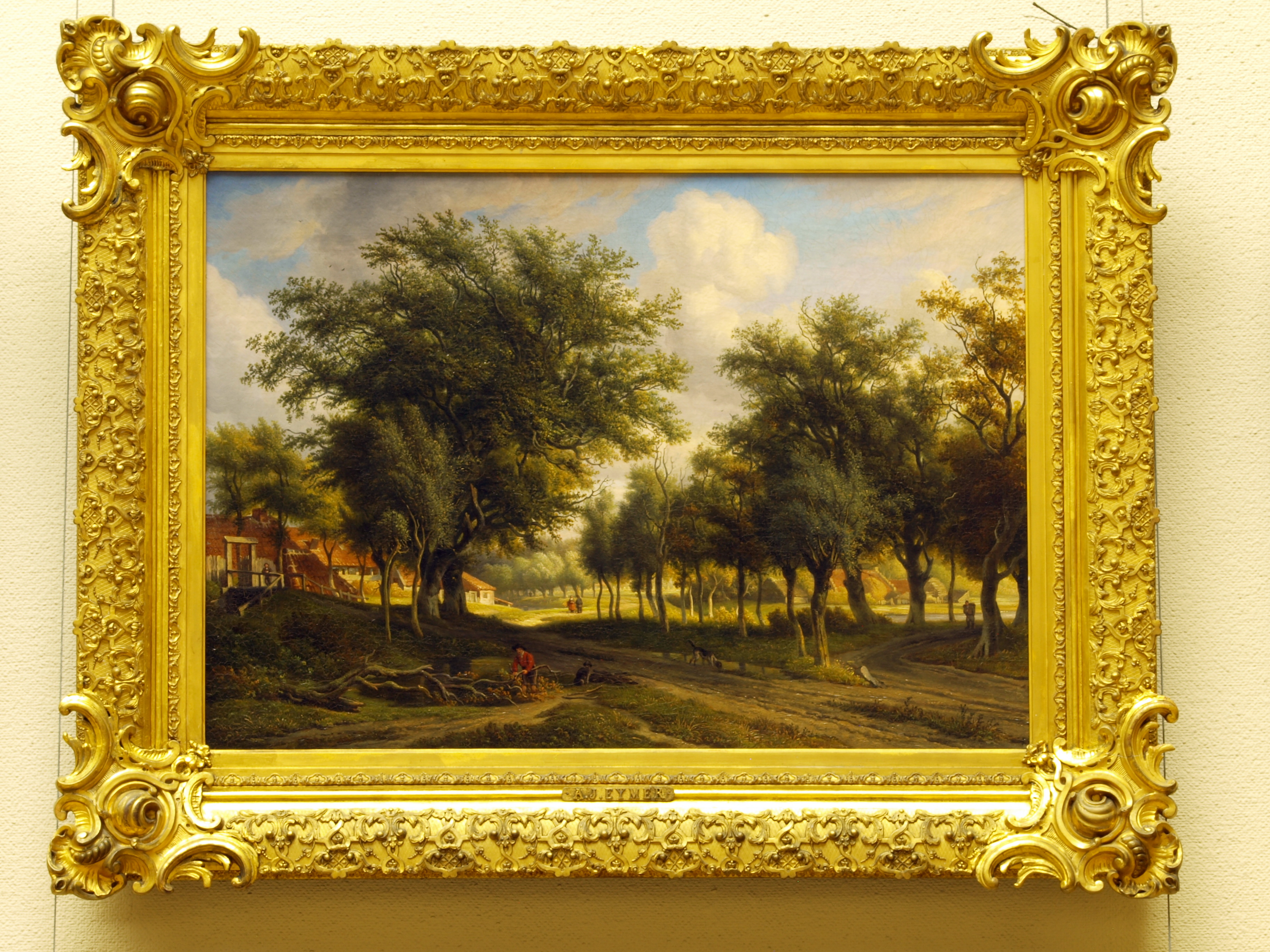
Landscape near Heemstede, collection Teylers Museum

Arnoldus Johannes Eymer (1803, Amsterdam – 1863, Haarlem), was a painter, draftsman, lithographer and watercolourist from the Netherlands.

== Biography ==
According to the RKD he was born in Amsterdam, where he first learned and practised the broker trade. In his spare time he took up painting until 1834, when he decided to concentrate on painting. Eymer was a pupil of Cornelis Steffelaar and worked with Jan van Ravenswaay and later became the father of the painter L.J. Eymer. He made a grand tour from 1835 to 1836 to Bad Bentheim and the Harz Mountains in Germany, where he produced landscape paintings. After his tour Eymer moved to Haarlem, where he lived until 1863 and where his works are in the collections of the Frans Hals Museum and the Teylers Museum.
