= Firmin Aerts =

Belgian politician

Personal details
- Born: 16 August 1929 (age 97)

Firmin Aerts (16 August 1929) is a former Belgian politician. He was a member of the Chamber of Representatives and was Senator of Belgium.
