= Harry Aarts =

Dutch politician (1930-2020)

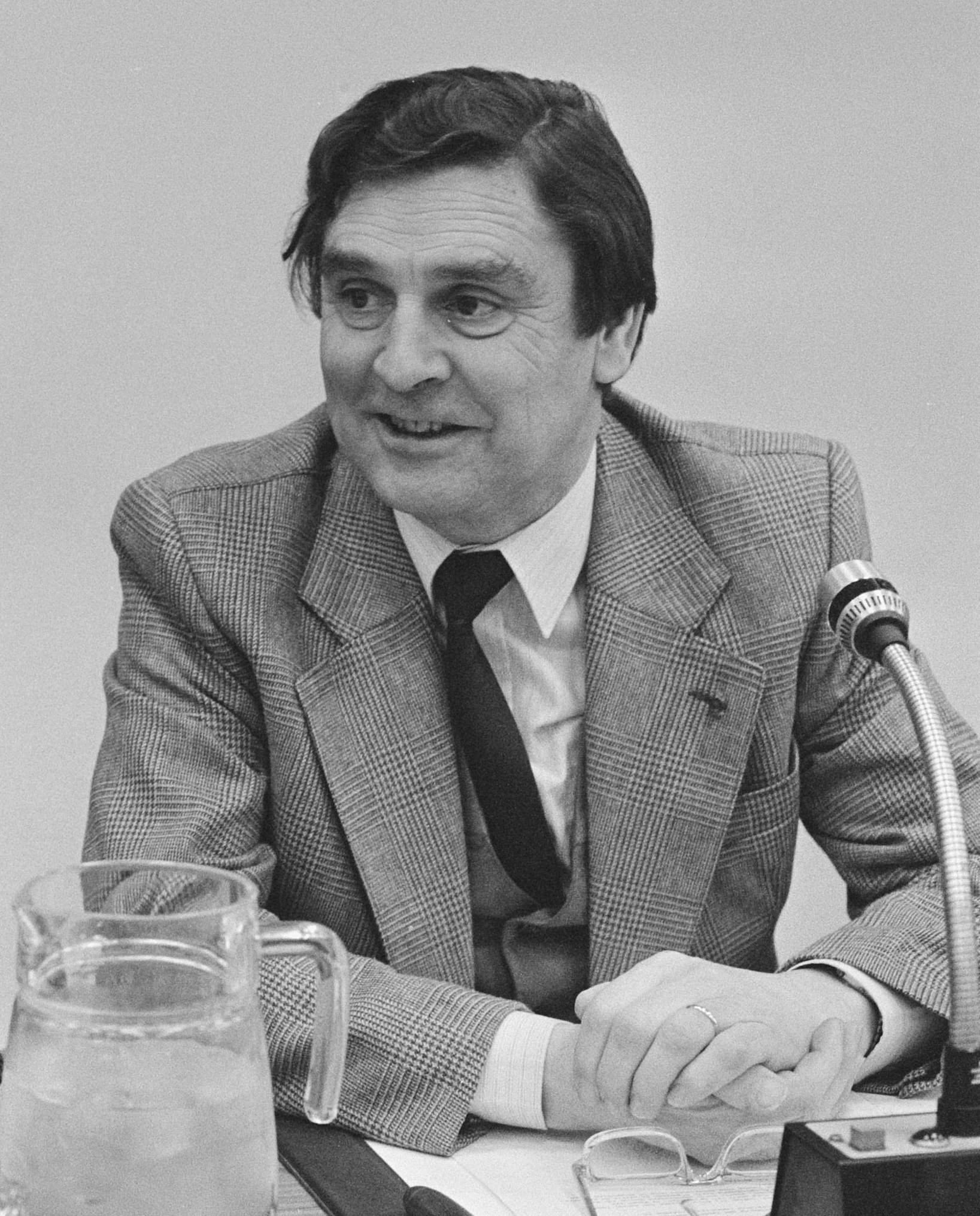
- Aarts in 1985

Member of the House of Representatives
- In office 23 January 1973 – 1 October 1993

Personal details
- Born: Henricus Johannes Bernardus Aarts; 9 March 1930 's-Hertogenbosch, Netherlands
- Died: 25 March 2020 (aged 90) Tilburg, Netherlands
- Party: Catholic People's Party (1968–1980), Christian Democratic Appeal (since 1980)

Henricus Johannes Bernardus "Harry" Aarts (9 March 1930 – 25 March 2020) was a Dutch politician. He served in the House of Representatives for the Catholic People's Party and later the Christian Democratic Appeal from 23 January 1973 until 1 October 1993.

== Life ==
Aarts was born in 's-Hertogenbosch on 9 March 1930. After attending primary and high school in the same city he studied political science at the Catholic University Nijmegen between 1949 and 1955. Aarts was a member of the municipal council of 's-Hertogenbosch from 1 September 1953 to 2 September 1958. After working at the Heineken brewery for two years he was organisation advisor at the Association of Netherlands Municipalities between 1959 and 1965. He was then appointed mayor of Berkel-Enschot and served from 16 July 1965 until 16 March 1974.

Aarts became a member of the House of Representatives for the Catholic People's Party on 23 January 1973. From 1975 to 1978 he served as chair of the commission of interior affairs. When the Catholic People's Party merged into the Christian Democratic Appeal in 1980 Aarts remained a member. He also served as chair of the commission of development aid between 1978 and 1989 and foreign affairs between 1989 and 1993. Aarts left the House on 1 October 1993. He subsequently served as member in extraordinary service of the Council of State until 1 October 1998.

Aarts was appointed Knight in the Order of the Netherlands Lion on 29 April 1985. He died on 25 March 2020 in Tilburg of COVID-19.
