= Philippe de Pret Roose =

Belgian bobsledder (1908–1983)

Count Phlippe de Pret Roose de Calesberg (16 October 1908 – 1983) was a Belgian bobsledder who competed in the 1930s. He finished eighth in the four-man event at the 1936 Winter Olympics in Garmisch-Partenkirchen.

He was part of the de Pret Roose de Calesberg family.
