= Aert Jansz Marienhof =

Dutch painter

Aert Jansz or Jan Aertsz Marienhof (1626 in Utrecht – 1652 in Brussels), was a Dutch Golden Age painter.

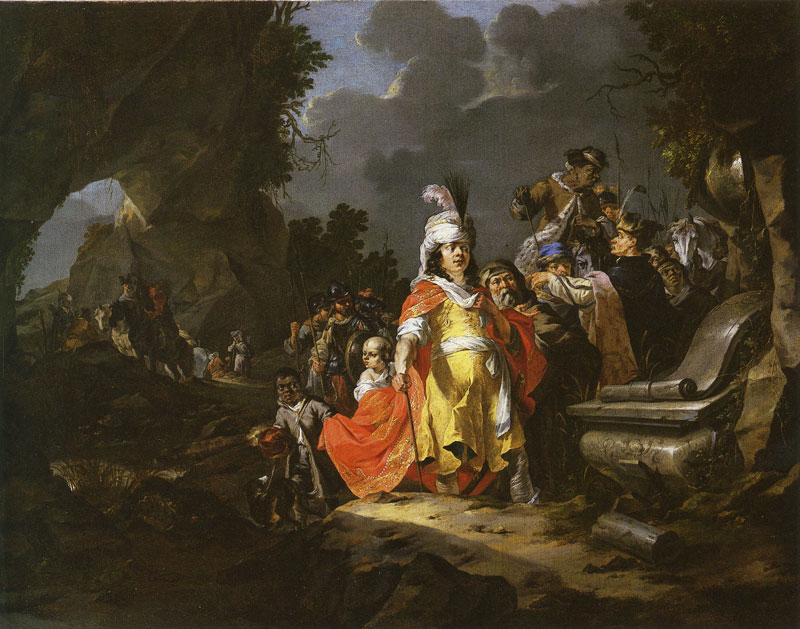
Alexander the Great visiting the grave of Achilles, 1649

According to Arnold Houbraken he left Utrecht for Brussels and made small paintings in the style of Rubens that were quite popular. He married young, and died young.

According to the Netherlands Institute for Art History, Aert Jansz was the son of the glass painter Jan Aertsz Marienhof and their work is sometimes confused with each other. Today this name is generally only used in reference to paintings.
