= Aart Brederode =

Dutch field hockey player (1942–2020)

Personal information
- Nationality: Dutch
- Born: 22 March 1942 The Hague, Netherlands
- Died: 8 May 2020 (aged 78)

Sport
- Sport: Field hockey

Aart Brederode (22 March 1942 – 8 May 2020) was a Dutch field hockey player. He competed in the men's tournament at the 1968 Summer Olympics.
