= Aart Klein =

Dutch photographer

Aart Klein (August 2, 1909 - October 31, 2001) was a Dutch photographer born in Amsterdam. His photos mostly consisted of black and white landscapes with a graphic style, but later transitioned into portraiture. Klein said that his photographs were a white on black, not black on white because “if you don't do anything you get a black image. Things only happen when you open the shutter; then you make a drawing in white”.

== Career ==
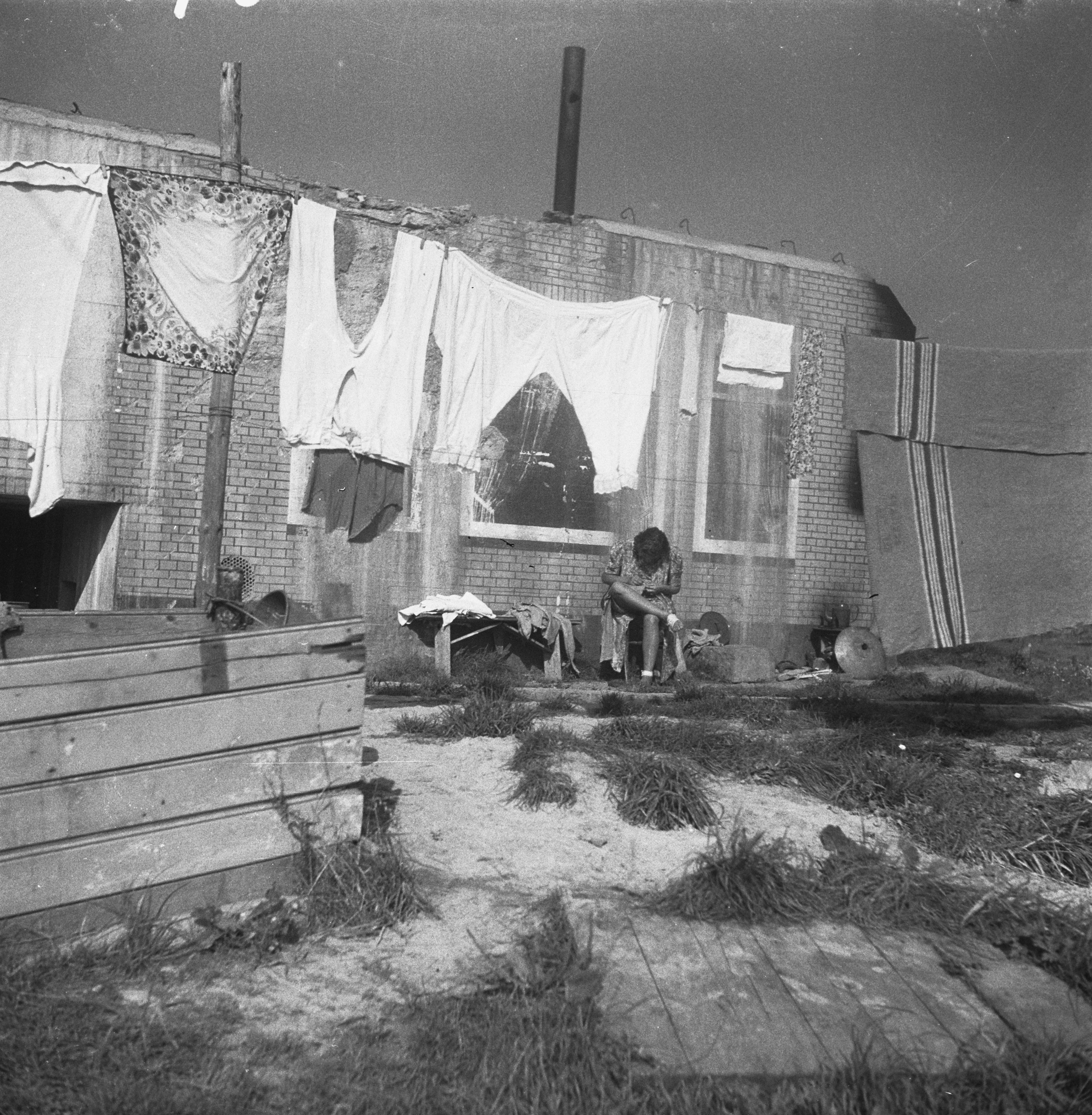
A bunker serving as a house in Zeelandic Flanders photographed by Aart Klein in October 1945

Klein began working at the Netherlands' premier photo press agency, Polygoon in the 1930s, without having any formal training in photography. During his time at Polygoon, he started as an administrative assistant and continued to work there for nine years. During World War II, he held a multitude of other jobs, ranging from press photographer to wedding photographer.

Klein was forced to work for the Nazis during the 1940s, however, he resisted by taking underground pictures and sending them to Allied forces in England and joining Particam, or Partisan Cameras, a group of Dutch resistance photographers.

After the War ended, Klein and members of the Partisan Cameras photographed the aftermath of the war in Germany in a collection of photos called Zoo leeft Duitschland op de puinhopen van het derde rijk ("How Germany Lives. On the Ruins of the Third Reich"). Some members of this group went on to form a new photo agency of the same name, Particam, later changing it Particam Pictures.

Klein's technique was unusual in that he avoided the use of a flash by heating the developer. This allowed for darkened rooms such as theaters to be photographed inconspicuously. Developing this technique aided in Particam Pictures ability to corner the stage market in theatre, opera, ballet, and circus shows.

The North Sea flood of 1953, the worst storm in Dutch history, flooded the southern part of the country. 1,835 people were killed, forty seven thousand homes were destroyed and three hundred and six pounds of dikes and embankments were damaged. Klein, along with other photographers and photojournalists, depicted the aftermath of this storm and its effect on the country.

Klein spent hours in dark rooms creating the contrast or effect that he had in his mind. One of his many talents was the ability to photograph birds as if he positioned them himself. This talent led to one of his assistants saying that he carried birds in his pocket. However, this talent was due to Klein’s ability to wait until the right moment where the outcome matched his vision. He would then spend his time in the dark rooms to create his contrasting colors. His work entitled Zebra (1957) strongly shows this practice because of the sharp etching across the picture that creates an almost hypnotizing pattern.

In 1956 Klein decided to leave Patricam Pictures and venture into his own studio. In this studio he created what are considered his most famous images of the Delta engineering project. The theme of the book seemed to be a continuation of his photography during the flood, which was the human struggle against the force of water. He focused on the juxtaposition of infrastructure and the natural landscape of the Netherlands. These works shared with his previous work the emphasis on stylized patterns of darkness and light. He depicted the progress of his country in a personal, yet optimistic way.

After this photo series ended Klein worked for the newspaper Algemeen Handelsblad and other photography companies. Toward the end of his life, around the 1980s, he traveled with aid from grants and the government, but his activity as a photographer began to dwindle.

Klein died in 2001, at the age of 92.

== Awards and honors ==
- 1982 Klein received the Capi-Lux Alblas Prize
- 1986, an exhibition was mounted in the Netherlands
- 1996 Klein received a fund for the VAD and Architecture prize
