= Johannes Josephus Aarts =

Dutch painter

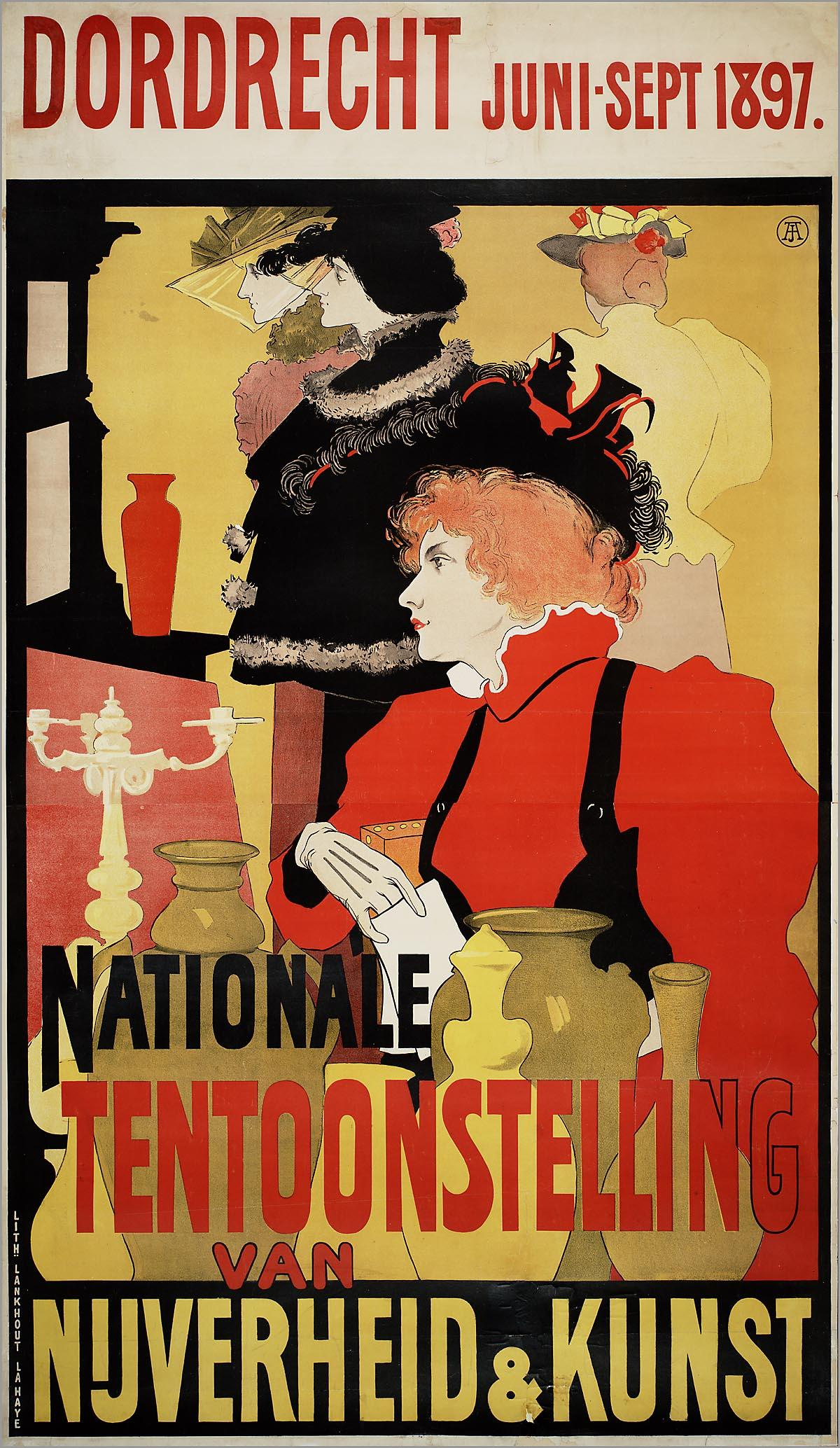
Nationale Tentoonstelling van Nijverheid & Kunst, June- Sept 1897.

Johannes Josephus Aarts (18 August 1871 – 19 October 1934) was a Dutch painter, illustrator, lithographer, engraver, etcher, writer, academic teacher and director, lecturer, sculptor and book-cover designer.

== Life and work ==
Jan Aarts was born in The Hague, where he trained at the Royal Academy of Art. He was active there until 1911, and in Amsterdam from 1911 to 1934. Initially, until around 1900, Aarts worked above all on engravings. Thereafter he began to also use other graphic methods. In his work, one found depictions of farmworkers, dyke workers and later also tramps, beggars and invalids. Between 1920 and 1930 he produced mostly visionary work with apocalyptic scenes. He died in Amsterdam.

Aarts often wrote for the Hague newspaper Het Vaderland; he taught at the Arts Academy in The Hague, and later was professor at the Royal Academy in Amsterdam, as successor to Pieter Dupont; he produced sculptures as preliminary studies for his graphic work. He thereby contributed to the renewal of various graphic techniques in the Netherlands. He painted portraits, animals and landscapes, including cityscapes and dune-landscapes.

== Gallery ==
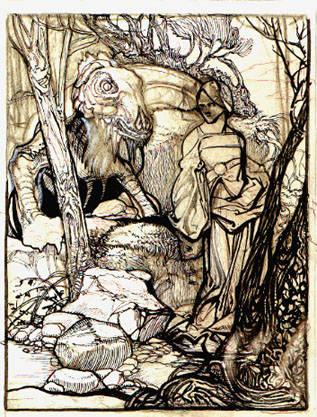

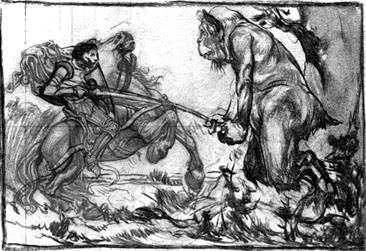

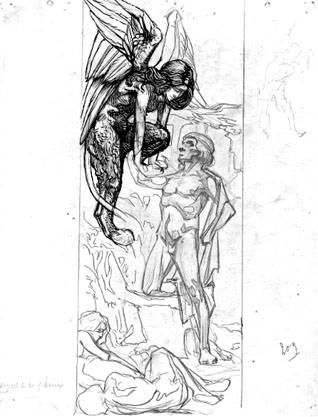

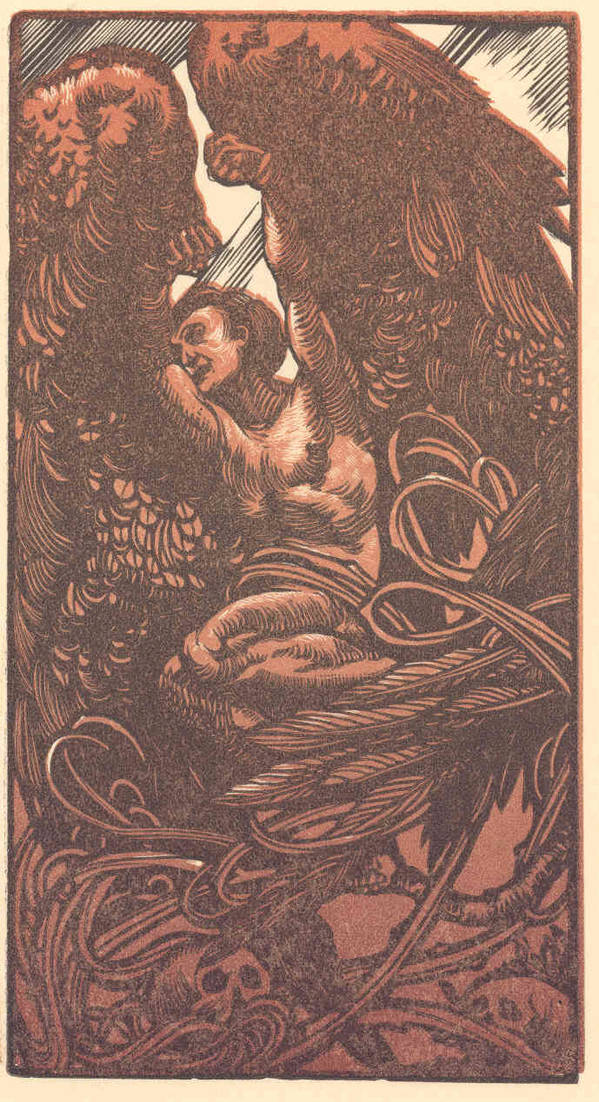
