= NOL =

NOL may refer to:

- Narrow outside lane
- Naval Ordnance Laboratory
- Neptune Orient Lines
- Net operating loss
- New Orleans Union Passenger Terminal, Louisiana, United States; Amtrak station code NOL
- NOL Universe

== See also ==
- Nol (disambiguation)
