= Moere =

Coordinates: 51.12233°N 2.95567°E

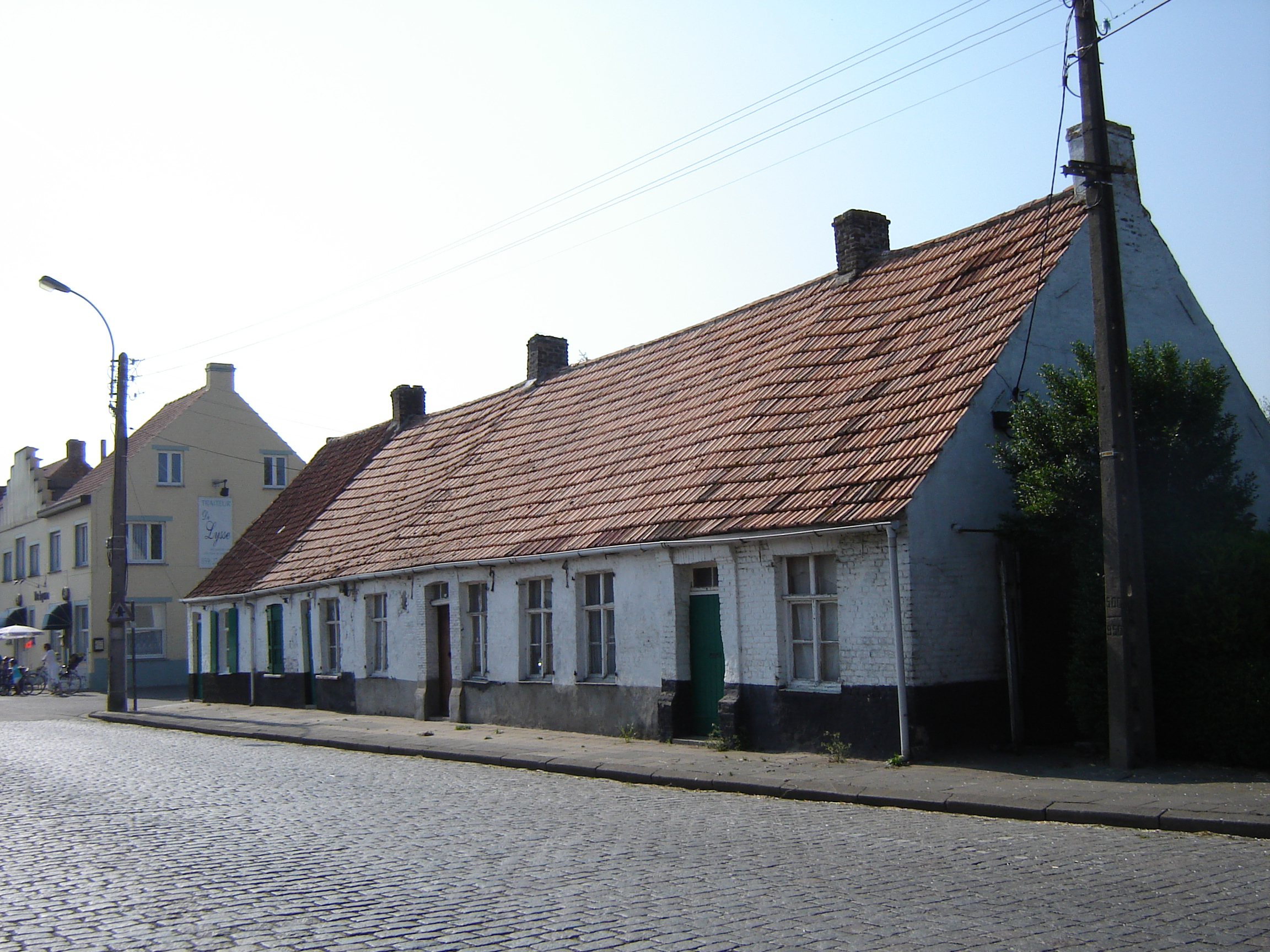

Moere is a small village located within the municipality of Gistel in West Flanders, Belgium. The village gained some fame when American singer Marvin Gaye moved there for several months in the early 1980s. During his stay, the singer composed his hit songs "Sexual Healing" and "Midnight Love." The house he resided in remains an attraction to this day.

Another famous inhabitant of the village was Alfons Vanhee, a priest who was a friend of the romantic poet Guido Gezelle in the latter half of the 19th century. Vanhee is best known for composing the text Het manneke uit de mane which is roughly translated as "The man in the Moon".
