= Maaike Aarts =

Dutch violinist

Maaike Aarts (born in Amsterdam on 10 March 1976) is a Dutch violinist. She was a member of the Royal Concertgebouw Orchestra, and now plays as a first violin in the Netherlands Chamber Orchestra. She was briefly a member of the heavy metal band Celestial Season, playing in their 1995 releases Solar Lovers and Sonic Orb.

== Education ==
She received her master's degree from the Royal Conservatoire in The Hague and served as first violinist in the prestigious Royal Concertgebouw Orchestra from 2004 to 2010. However, she eventually left the orchestra to devote more time to practicing and teaching the Alexander Technique. She further pursued private lessons under teachers such as Missy Vineyard and John Nichols, as well as additional training on pregnancy and childbirth with Ilana Machover. Aarts has actively participated in all international conferences on the Alexander Technique since 2008.

== Career ==
Aarts studied at the Amsterdam Conservatory and the Royal Concertgebouw Orchestra, Academy, and has worked in workshops for companies and orchestras, taught summer courses, and provided audition coaching.
