= 's Gravenmoer =

- Village
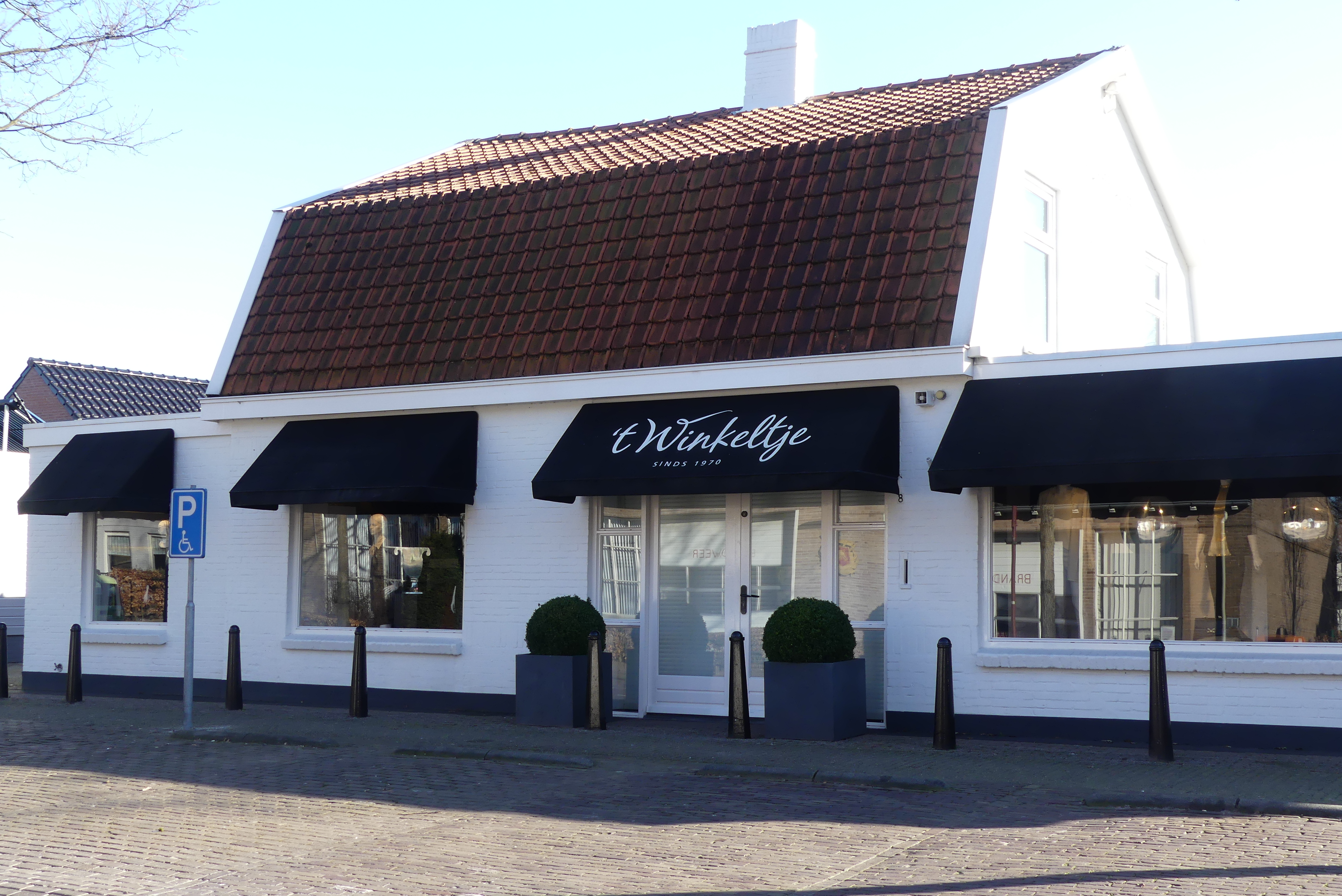
- Shop in 's Gravenmoer

- Location in the province of North Brabant in the Netherlands 's Gravenmoer (Netherlands)
- Coordinates: 51°39′31″N 4°56′28″E
- Country: Netherlands
- Province: North Brabant
- Municipality: Dongen

Area
  - Total: 5.23 km^{2} (2.02 sq mi)
- Elevation: 1.6 m (5.2 ft)

Population (2021)
  - Total: 2,260
  - Density: 432/km^{2} (1,120/sq mi)
- Time zone: UTC+1 (CET)
  - Summer (DST): UTC+2 (CEST)
- Postal code: 5109
- Dialing code: 0462

's Gravenmoer is a village in the Dutch province of North Brabant. It is located in the municipality of Dongen, about 3 km north of the town of Dongen. The village has a population of about 2190 inhabitants, including the farmlands to the north of the village.

== History ==
The village was first mentioned in 1326 as Sgraven moer, and means "moorland of the count". In 1293, Floris V, Count of Holland donated the land to Steven van Waalwijk for the excavation of peat. The economy used to be dominated by peat. In the 16th century, the 's-Gravenmoersche Vaart was dug after an earlier canal had silted.

The tower of the Dutch Reformed church was built in the 14th century. The nave dates from the 15th century. In 1672, it was damaged by fire and rebuilt in 1680.

Adam van der Duyn, heer van 's-Gravenmoer was an officer of the Danish Auxiliary Corps in the Williamite War in Ireland.His name was anglicised as Scravenmore.

's Gravenmoer was home to 420 people in 1840. Entrop used to manufacture bikes, four cars, and one double-decker bus in factory in 's Gravenmoer. In 1909, he constructed the first car of the Netherlands. 's Gravenmoer was a separate municipality until 1997, when it became a part of Dongen. In the 19th century, the municipality consisted of two neighbourhoods, called Dorp or Straat ("Village", or "Street") and ('s-Gravenmoersche) Vaart ("Canal"). The former part is now the village of 's Gravenmoer, formerly also called 's-Moer.

's-Gravenmoersche Vaart should not be confused with the contemporary village Vaart, which lies along the same canal a short distance to the south. 's-Gravenmoersche Vaart is now seen as part of the village of 's Gravenmoer, although it is situated 1 km to the east of the village center.

== Gallery ==
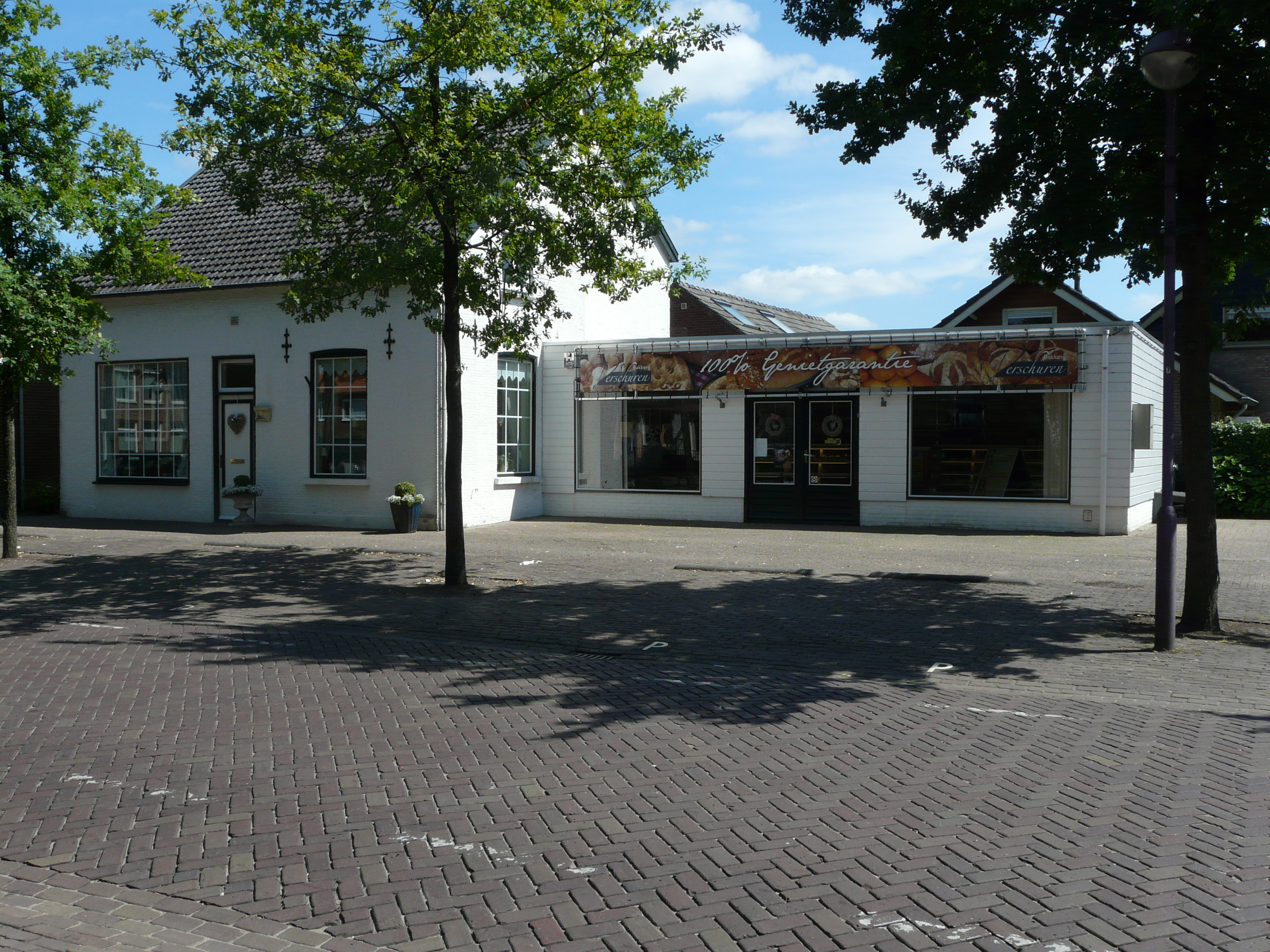
Bakery

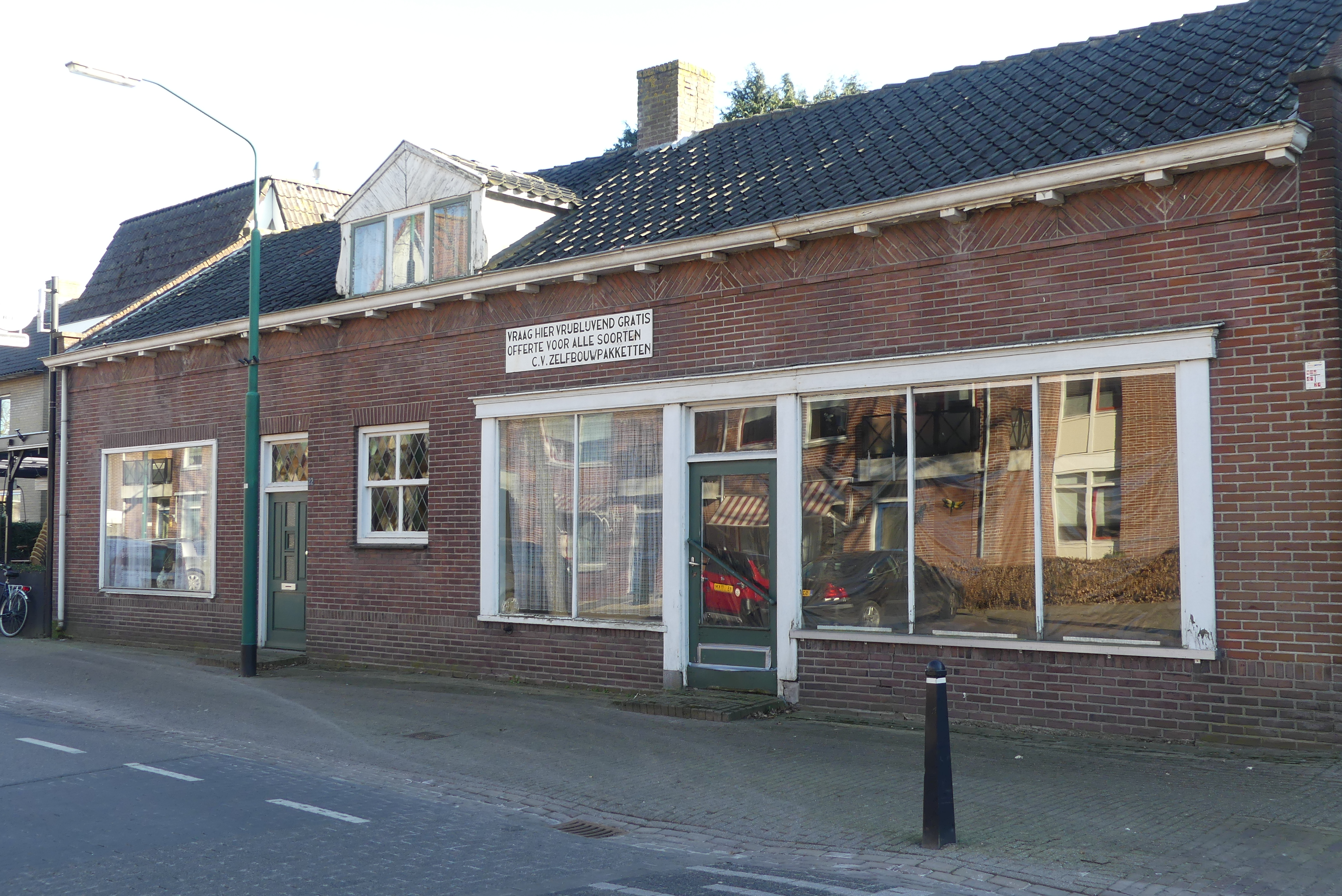
House in 's Gravenmoer

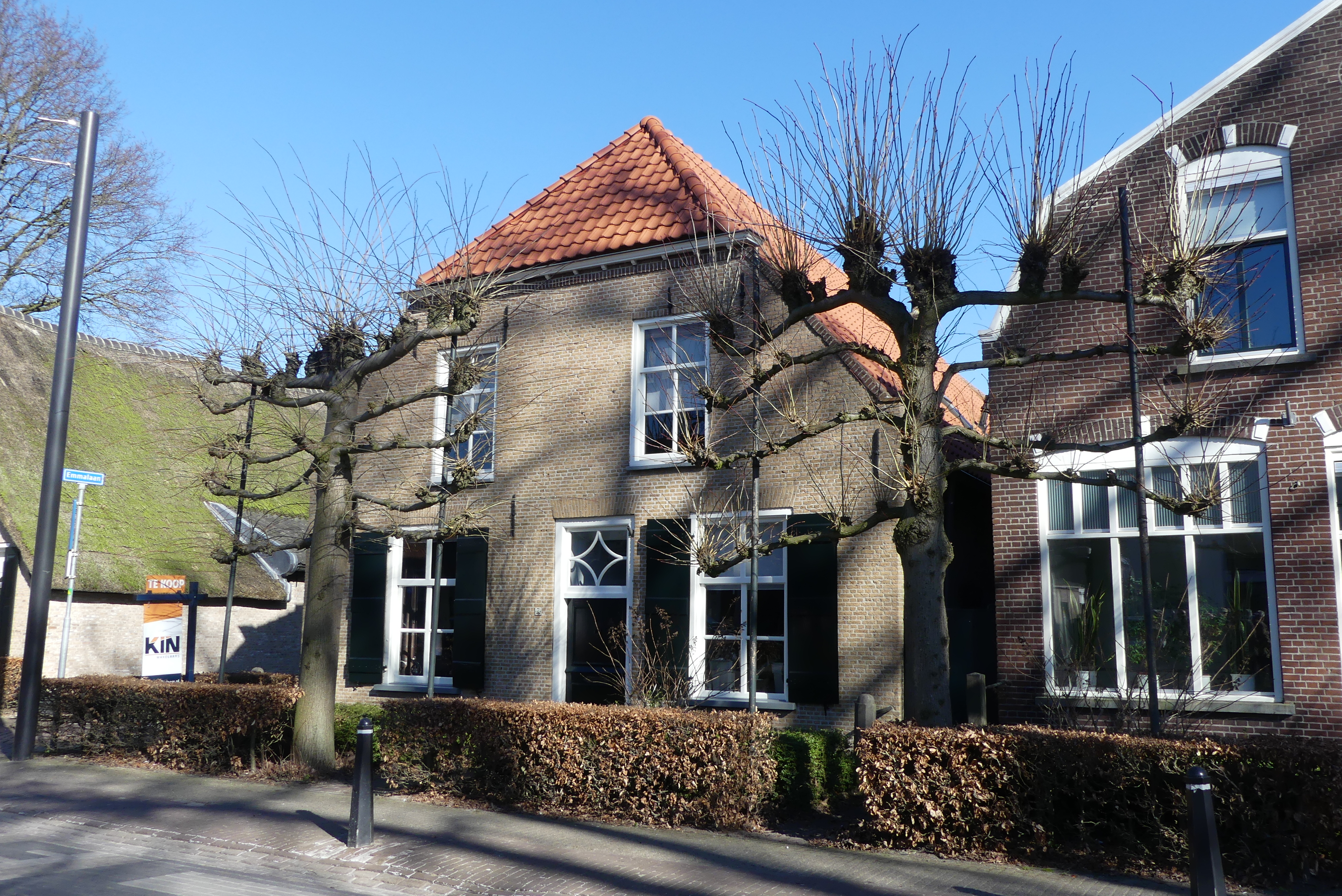
House in 's Gravenmoer

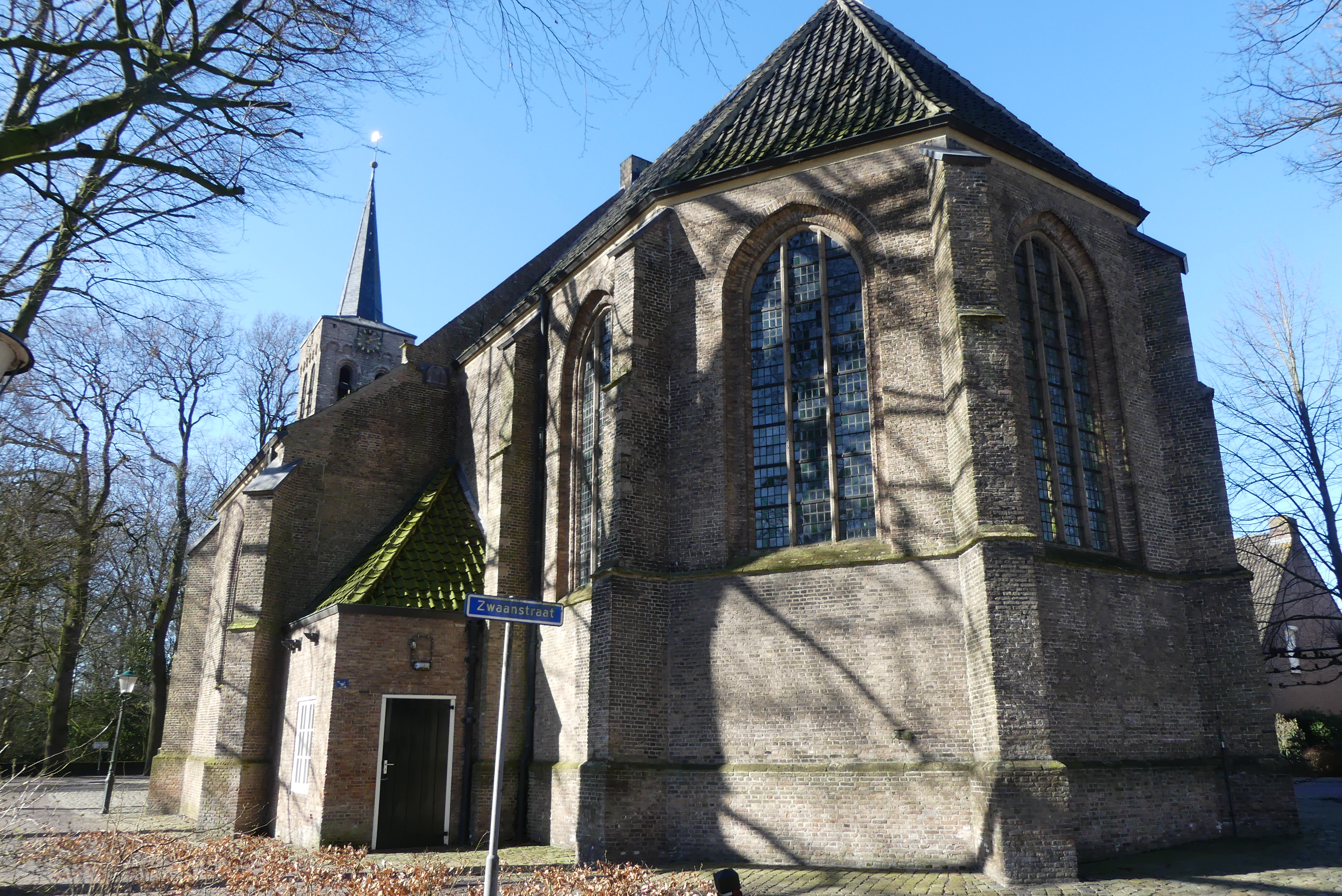
St Martinus Church
