= Aerts =

The Aerts (also spelled Aarts) was a Dutch automobile manufactured in 1899; a small number of cars are known to have been built at Dongen, but little else seems to be known about the marque.

The manufacturer also advertised as "Neerlandia, the first Dutch car", although "Groninger" and Eysink were earlier.
