= Arnout de Muyser =

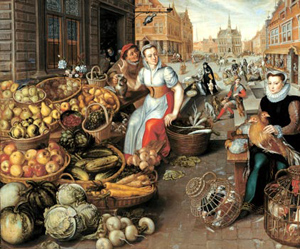
- Arnout de Muyser, The market woman
- Known for: Painting of market scenes

Arnout de Muyser was a painter active in the second half of the sixteenth century. He is an elusive character, who left several notable paintings of market scenes, but little is known about the artist himself. His work is believed to have influenced a later generation of German painters.

== Work ==
Little is known about Arnout apart from the two market scenes he painted, namely Woman selling fruit and vegetables and Vegetable and Flower Market, formerly in the collections of the Farnese family of Parma and now kept at the Museum of Capodimonte in Naples. Licia Ragghianti Collobi notes the influences of Joachim Beuckelaer for still lifes, Hans Vredeman de Vries for architectural decoration and Maerten de Vos for figures in these two market scenes, which suggest he was trained in Antwerp around 1560-1570. Another work, A Fish Seller's Stall has also been attributed to de Muyser.

Elizabeth Honig has compared de Muyser's work with later paintings executed in Frankfurt and has concluded that de Muyser played a role in bringing paintings of market scenes to Germany. The structure, design and the painting's themes suggest that there was some link between Antwerp and Frankfurt.

== See also ==
- Museum of Capodimonte

== Bibliography ==
- Akoun, Babylone Editions.
- Bénézit, Paris, Gründ.
