= Aert Anthoniszoon =

Dutch marine painter

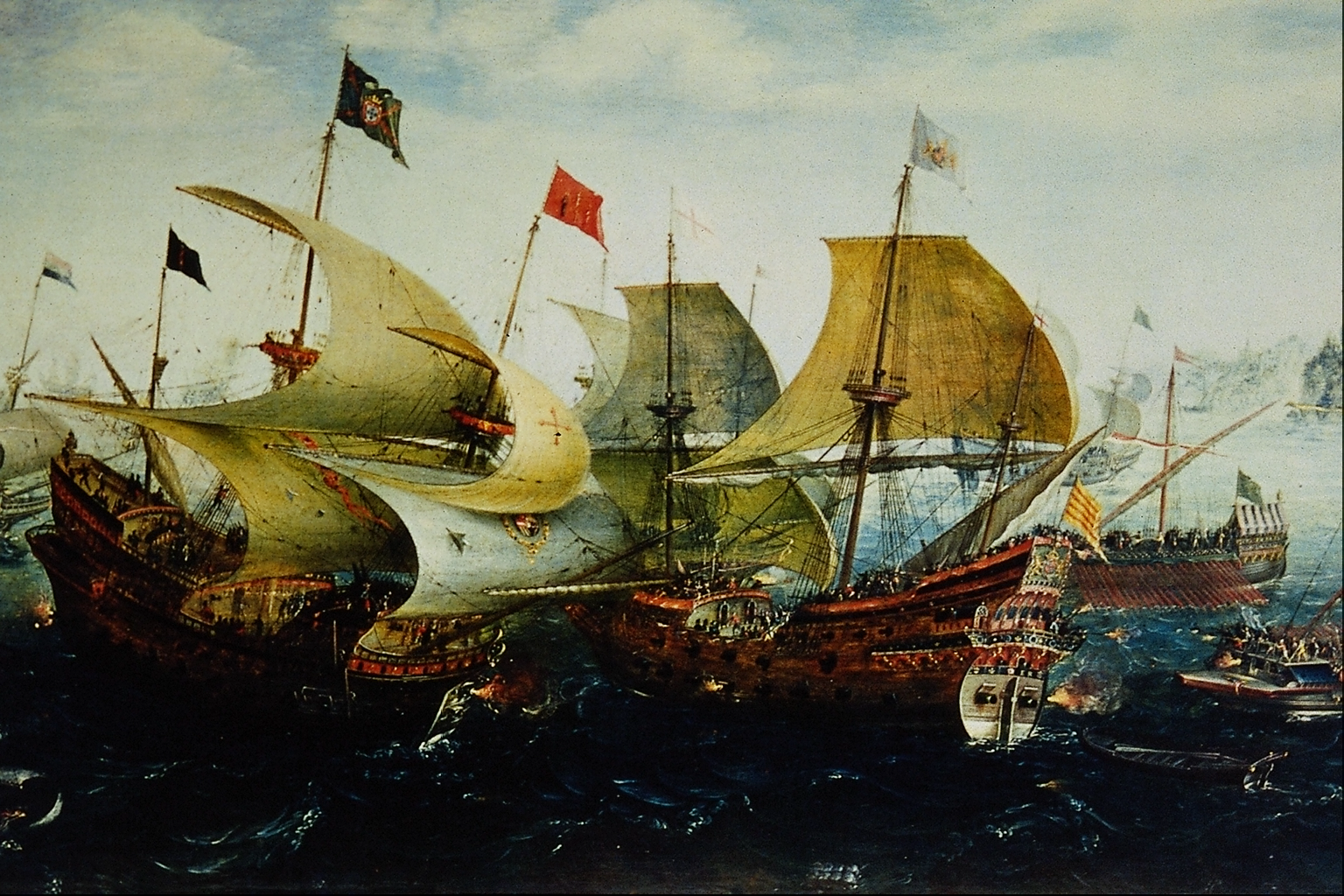
Slag bij Cadix (The Battle of Cádiz, 1608, detail) by Aert Anthoniszoon, in the collection of the Rijksmuseum in Amsterdam, the Netherlands

Aert Anthoniszoon (abbreviated Anthonisz.) or Anthonissen, also known as Aart or Aert van Antum (born c. 1579–1580; buried 7 September 1620) was a Dutch marine painter.

== Life and career ==
Aert Anthoniszoon was born at Antwerp. His parents moved the family to Amsterdam in 1591. He was possibly a pupil of Hendrick Cornelisz Vroom. In 1603, when he married Baycken Coutermans from Mechelen he signed a document in Amsterdam stating that he was 23 years old and had lived there for 12 years. He gave her a power of attorney to settle an inheritance in Mechelen in 1614. He was buried in the Zuiderkerk of Amsterdam.

Until 1973 Anthoniszoon was known as Aart or Aert van Antum, as his signatures on early paintings were interpreted as "Aert [van] Antum". Later research showed his signature to be "AERT ANT[...]", with the letters of his surname included with varying degrees of completion. One reason so little is known of him is that his life and work were overlooked or omitted by early 17th- and 18th-century painter biographers such as Arnold Houbraken.

Anthoniszoon was the father of the marine painter Hendrick van Anthonissen. A seapiece by him, signed "A. A.", is in the Berlin Museum.
