= German name =

Personal names in German-speaking Europe consist of one or several given names (Vorname, plural Vornamen) and a surname (Nachname, Familienname). The Vorname is usually gender-specific. A name is usually cited in the "Western order" of "given name, surname". The most common exceptions are alphabetized list of surnames, e.g. "Bach, Johann Sebastian", as well as some official documents and spoken southern German dialects. In most of this, the German conventions parallel the naming conventions in most of Western and Central Europe, including English, Dutch, Italian, and French. There are some vestiges of a patronymic system as they survive in parts of Eastern Europe and Scandinavia, but these do not form part of the official name.

Women traditionally adopted their husband's name upon marriage and would occasionally retain their maiden name by hyphenation, in a so-called Doppelname, e.g. "Else Lasker-Schüler". Recent legislation motivated by gender equality now allows a married couple to choose the surname they want to use, including an option for men to keep their birthname hyphenated to the common family name in the same way. It is also possible for the spouses to do without a common surname altogether and to keep their birthnames.

The most common given names are either Biblical ("Christian", derived from names of Biblical characters or saints; Johann/Hans "John", Georg/Jörg "George", Jakob "Jacob" and "James"; Anna, Maria, Barbara, Christina) or from Germanic names (Friedrich "Frederick", Ludwig "Lewis", etc.) Since the 1990s, there has however been a trend of parents picking non-German forms of names, either for originality, or influenced by international celebrities, e.g. Liam (Gaelic form of William) rather than the German equivalent Wilhelm and Mila.

Most surnames are derived either from given names (patronym), occupations, or from geographical origin, less often from bodily attributes. They became heritable with the beginning of central demographic records in the early modern period.

== Forenames ==
The Vorname (in English forename) is usually given to a child by the parents shortly after birth. It is common to give a child several Vornamen (forenames), one of them intended for everyday use and known as the Rufname ("appellation name" or "call name"). This Rufname is often underlined on official documents, as it is sometimes the second or third name in the sequence of given names on official record, even though it is the given name in daily use from childhood. For example, in the resume submitted by mathematician Emmy Noether to Erlangen University in 1907,

"Ich, Amalie Emmy Noether, bayerischer Staatsangehörigkeit und israelitischer Konfession, bin geboren zu Erlangen am 23. März 1882 ..."
"I, Amalie Emmy Noether, of Bavarian nationality and of Israelite confession, born in Erlangen on 23 March 1882..."

the underlining of Emmy communicates that this is the Rufname, even though it is the second of two official given names.

In Germany, the chosen name must be approved by the local Standesamt (civil registry office). Although a 1980 law previously stated that the name must indicate the gender of the child, a 2008 court ruling unanimously upheld the right of parents to decide their child's name, stating that the only legal limitation is that the name does not negatively affect the well-being of the child.

Among German nobility, a fashion arose in the early modern period to give a large number of forenames, often six or more. This fashion was to some extent copied by the bourgeois class, but subsided again after the end of the 19th century, so that while two or three forenames remain common, a larger number is now rare. The practice persists among German nobility, e.g. Johann Friedrich Konrad Carl Eduard Horst Arnold Matthias, Prince of Saxe-Meiningen, Duke of Saxony (b. 1952), Ernst August Albert Paul Otto Rupprecht Oskar Berthold Friedrich-Ferdinand Christian-Ludwig, Prince of Hanover (b. 1954), Christian Heinrich Clemens Paul Frank Peter Welf Wilhelm-Ernst Friedrich Franz Prince of Hanover and Dukelin, Duke of Brunswick and Lüneburg (b. 1985).

=== Popular given names ===
Traditionally, there are dialectal differences between the regions of German-speaking Europe, especially visible in the forms of hypocorisms. These differences are still perceptible in the list of most popular names, even though they are marginalized by super-regional fashionable trends: As of 2012, the top ten given names of Baden-Württemberg (Southern Germany) and of Schleswig-Holstein (Northern Germany) share the entries Ben, Paul, Finn, Luca, Max (male), Mia, Emma, Lea, Leonie, Anna, Lena, Hanna, while Schleswig-Holstein retains the traditionally northern (Low German) forms Lasse (male) and Neele (female) in the top ten.

The following table gives the most popular given names in Germany for every tenth year (since 1890).

| Year | Feminine | Masculine |
|---|---|---|
| 1890 | Anna, Martha / Marta, Frieda / Frida, Berta / Beertha, Emma, Marie, Maria, Margarethe / Margarete, Erna, Elsa | Carl / Karl, Wilhelm, Otto, Heinrich, Friedrich, Paul, Hans, Gustav, Max, Ernst |
| 1900 | Anna, Martha / Marta, Frieda / Frida, Emma, Marie, Elisabeth, Maria, Berta / Bertha, Gertrud, Margarethe / Margarete | Wilhelm, Carl / Karl, Heinrich, Hermann, Friedrich, Paul, Otto, Ernst, Hans, Walter / Walther |
| 1910 | Gertrud, Erna, Martha / Marta, Hertha / Herta, Margarethe / Margarete, Anna, Käthe, Elisabeth, Frieda / Frida, Hildegard, | Walter / Walther, Carl / Karl, Hans, Wilhelm, Otto, Curt / Kurt, Heinrich, Hermann, Paul, Helmut / Helmuth |
| 1920 | Ilse, Hildegard, Gertrud, Irmgard, Gerda, Lieselotte, Elfriede, Ursula, Edith, Erna | Hans, Carl / Karl, Heinz, Curt / Kurt, Werner, Walter / Walther, Günter / Günther, Herbert, Helmut / Helmuth, Gerhard, Rolf |
| 1930 | Ursula, Helga, Gisela, Inge, Gerda, Ingrid, Ingeborg, Ilse, Edith, Hildegard | Günter / Günther, Hans, Carl / Karl, Heinz, Werner, Gerhard, Horst, Helmut / Helmuth, Walter / Walther, Curt / Kurt, Rolf |
| 1940 | Karin, Ingrid, Helga, Renate, Elke, Ursula, Erika, Christa, Gisela, Monika | Peter, Klaus / Claus, Hans, Jürgen, Dieter, Günter / Günther, Horst, Manfred, Uwe, Wolfgang |
| 1950 | Brigitte, Renate, Karin, Angelika, Monika, Ursula, Ingrid, Marion, Barbara, Gisela, Regina | Peter, Hans, Wolfgang, Klaus / Claus, Manfred, Jürgen, Michael, Bernd, Werner, Günter / Günther |
| 1960 | Sabine, Susanne, Petra, Birgit, Gabriele, Andrea, Martina, Ute, Heike, Angelika | Thomas, Michael, Andreas, Peter, Frank, Uwe, Klaus / Claus, Stefan / Stephan, Jürgen, Jörg |
| 1970 | Nicole, Anja, Claudia, Stefanie / Stephanie, Andrea, Tanja, Katrin / Catrin / Kathrin, Susanne, Petra, Sabine | Stefan / Stephan, Michael, Andreas, Thomas, Frank, Markus / Marcus, Christian, Oliver, Matthias, Torsten |
| 1980 | Julia, Katrin / Catrin / Kathrin, Stefanie / Stephanie, Melanie, Sandra, Anja, Nicole, Nadine, Christina, Sabrina | Christian, Michael, Sebastian, Stefan / Stephan, Jan, Daniel, Martin, Dennis, Alexander, Thomas |
| 1990 | Julia, Sarah / Sara, Jennifer, Katharina, Lisa, Christina, Jessika / Jessica, Anna, Laura, Melanie | Jan, Tobias, Christian, Alexander, Daniel, Patrick, Dennis, Sebastian, Marcel, Philipp |
| 2000 | Anna, Lea / Leah, Sarah / Sara, Hannah / Hanna, Michelle, Laura, Lisa, Lara, Lena, Julia | Lukas / Lucas, Jan, Tim, Finn / Fynn, Leon, Niklas / Niclas, Tom, Jonas, Jannik / Yannik / Yannick / Yannic, Luca / Luka |
| 2010 | Mia, Hannah / Hanna, Lena, Lea / Leah, Emma, Anna, Leonie / Leoni, Lilli / Lilly / Lili, Emily / Emilie, Lina | Leon, Lukas / Lucas, Ben, Finn / Fynn, Jonas, Paul, Luis / Louis, Maximilian, Luca / Luka, Felix |
| 2020 | Mia, Emilia, Hannah / Hanna, Emma, Sofia / Sophia, Lina, Ella, Mila, Clara, Lea / Leah | Noah / Noa, Ben, Mateo / Matteo / Matheo / Mattheo, Finn / Fynn, Leon, Elias / Elyas, Paul, Henry / Henri, Luis / Louis, Felix |

== Surnames ==
Surnames (family name; Nachname, Familienname) were gradually introduced in German-speaking Europe during the Late Middle Ages. Many of such surnames are derived from nicknames. They are generally classified into four groups by derivation: given names, occupational designations, bodily attributes, and toponyms (including references to named buildings). Also, many family names display characteristic features of the dialect of the region they originated in.

- Given names often turned into family names when people were identified by their father's name. For example, the first name Ahrend developed into the family name Ahrends by adding a genitive s-ending, as in Ahrend's son.
  Examples: Ahrends/Ahrens, Burkhard, Wulff, Friedrich, Benz, Fritz. With many of the early city records written in Latin, occasionally the Latin genitive singular -i was used such as in Jakobi or Alberti or (written as -'y') in Mendelssohn Bartholdy.
- Occupational names are the most common form of family names; anybody who had an unusual job would have been bound to be identified by it. Examples: Gaschler (glass), Schmidt (smith), Müller (miller), Meier (farm administrator; akin to tenant, steward, sometimes also a bailiff), Schulze (constable), Fischer (fisherman), Schneider (tailor), Maurer (mason), Bauer (farmer), Zimmermann (carpenter), Metzger or Fleischer (butcher), Töpfer, Toepfer (potter) or Klingemann (weapons smith). Also, names referring to nobility such as Kaiser (emperor), König (king), Graf (count) are common, with the name bearers probably only a minor functionary of a monarch.
- Bodily attribute names are family names such as Krause (curly), Schwarzkopf (black head), Klein (small), Groß (big).
- Geographical names (toponyms) are derived from the name of a city or village, or the location of someone's home. They often have the '-er' postfix that signifies origin (as in English New Yorker). Examples: Kissinger (from Kissingen), Schwarzenegger (from Schwarzenegg or Schwarzeneck), Bayer (from Bavaria, German Bayern). Böhm indicates that a family originated in Bohemia. A special case of geographical names were those derived from a building or a natural landmark, e.g. a Busch (bush) or Springborn (spring/well). Before the advent of street names and numbers, even for long times afterwards, many important buildings like inns, mills and farmsteads were given house names or Hofnamen "estate names", e.g. Rothschild "red sign/escutcheon", Lachs "(sign of the) salmon", Bär "bear", Engels from Engel "angel", etc. A house or estate name could be combined with a profession, e.g. Rosenbauer (rose-farmer, from a farmstead called 'the rose'); Kindlmüller (child's miller, from a mill named 'the Christmas child', 'the prodigal child' or 'the king's child').

The preposition von ("of") was used to distinguish nobility; for example, if someone was baron of the village of Veltheim, his family name would be von Veltheim. In modern times, people who were elevated to nobility often had a 'von' added to their name. For example, Johann Wolfgang Goethe had his name changed to Johann Wolfgang von Goethe. This practice ended with the abolition of the monarchy in Germany and Austria in 1919. Sometimes von is also used in geographical names that are not noble, as in von Däniken.

With family names originating locally, many names display particular characteristics of the local dialects, such as the south German, Austrian and Swiss diminutive endings -l -el, -erl, -le or -li as in Kleibl, Netzel, Schäuble or Nägeli (from 'Nagel', nail). The same is true for regional variants in the naming of professions. While a barrel-maker from Hamburg may have been called "Böttcher", a Bavarian could easily have been called "Schäffler".

The surnames of the German Jews are a special case, as they were introduced later, in the late 18th to early 19th century, per fiat. The Prussian authorities imposed made-up and sometimes derogatory names. For instance, the name "Waldlieferant" (lit.: forest supplier) was "created" to ridicule a Jewish timber trader. Even way more offensive expressions ("Afterduft"; lit.: anus odour) were in use. This is by no means the rule, though; on the contrary, those surnames most quickly recognized as probably Jewish in origin are distinctly poetical ones, probably as they were made-up choices by the people themselves (e.g. Rosenzweig).

Immigration, often sponsored by local authorities, also brought foreign family names into the German-speaking regions. Depending on regional history, geography and economics, many family names have French, Dutch, Italian, Hungarian or Slavic (e.g. Polish) origins. Sometimes they survived in their original form; in other cases, the spelling would be adapted to German (the Slavic ending ic becoming the German -itz or -itsch or Baltic "-kis" becoming "-ke"). Over time, the spelling often changed to reflect native German pronunciation (Sloothaak for the Dutch Sloothaag); but some names, such as those of French Huguenots settling in Prussia, retained their spelling but with the pronunciation that would come naturally to a German reading the name: Marquard, pronounced French pronunciation: [maʁkaʁ] in French, ended up being pronounced German pronunciation: [ˈmaʁkvaʁt] much like the German Markwart from which it was originally derived.

=== Marriage ===
Traditionally, the wife adopts her husband's Nachname on marriage and drops her own. However, due to the legal equality of sexes, the opposite is possible as well, though rare.

A few examples of the practice under German law, if "Herr (Mr) Schmidt" and "Frau (Miss) Meyer" marry:

1. They can keep their former Nachnamen: Herr Schmidt and Frau (Mrs) Meyer. In the 1990s, the law was thus changed. They can later change to variant 2, though the reverse is not possible.
2. They can declare one name as a "marriage name" (Ehename). In doing so, they can either both adopt the husband's name, or both adopt the wife's name as an Ehename: Herr Meyer and Frau Meyer; Herr Schmidt and Frau Schmidt.
3. Since 2025 they can combine both names as marriage name, optionally combined by a hyphen (Schmidt-Meyer, Meyer-Schmidt, Schmidt Meyer or Meyer Schmidt). This name can be passed to the children, husband or wife do not have to adopt this name. Double names are restricted to two names. If one name already consists of two names, they can use one name of the two.
4. One partner, may combine both names (optionally by a hyphen). Thus, one bears a double name (Doppelname) (Herr Schmidt and Frau Meyer-Schmidt (or Frau Schmidt Meyer); the children have to be called Schmidt.). This was the only option for a double name from the 1990s until 2025.
5. Since 2025 it is possible to use a gender specific form of the name as typical for sorbic tradition (e.g. Kralowa as female form of Kral) or use patronymic or matronymic surnames

All children of a family have to receive the same Nachname at birth, which may be either the mother's or the father's Nachname, or a combined double name (traditionally it was the father's). If the parents adopted an Ehename this is the Nachname of the child. Children can also get a Doppelname if the parents are not married, and drop one part of the name when reaching the age of majority.

In Austria (§ 93 ABGB), a couple can choose either of their surnames as married name. In the default case, each partner retains their unmarried name. The partner who is changing surnames has the possibility to use their unmarried name alongside the married name with hyphenation.

In Switzerland (Art. 160 ZGB), the couple can opt to both retain their unmarried name, or the couple can choose to use either surname as their married name. If both retain their name, they need to declare which will be the surname of any future children.

=== Nobility ===
Titles of former aristocrats (like Graf for "Count") have become parts of the Nachname in Germany, giving longer names of several words, usually including the nobiliary particle von (meaning "of") or zu (meaning "to", sometimes "at"), often von und zu are also found together (meaning "of and to/at"). The legal rules for these names are the same as those for other Nachnamen, which gives rise to a number of cases where people legally bear such names but are not recognized by the associations of formerly noble families in Germany, which continue to apply the old rules of the German Empire in their publications. Most of these cases come about when a woman of noble descent marries a man with no title, and the two adopt the woman's name as their common Nachname, which was impossible under imperial law.

In Austria, titles of nobility including certain other orders and honours held by Austrian citizens were abolished on 3 April 1919, including nobiliary particles such as von, the use of such titles by Austrian citizens was punishable by a financial enforcement penalty until 2019. For example, Otto von Habsburg, Austria-Hungary's last crown prince, was referred to as Otto Habsburg(-Lothringen) in Austria. In Switzerland, where titles of nobility have been rare for several centuries, they can be used in private conversation, but are not officially recognized.

=== Common surnames ===
==== Germany ====
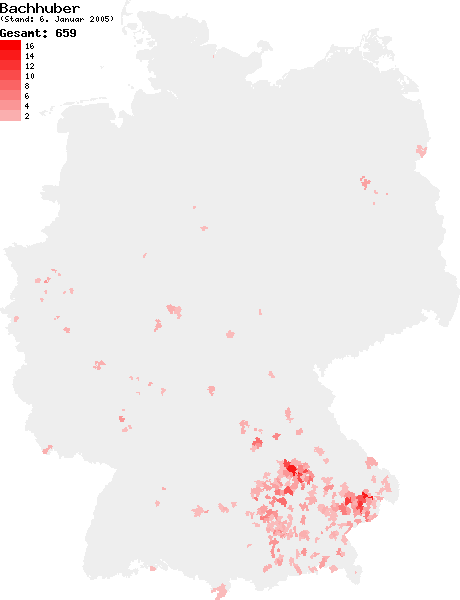
Distribution of the surname Bachhuber (lit. "peasant of an estate near a stream") in Germany (2005). Its Bavarian origin remains clearly visible.

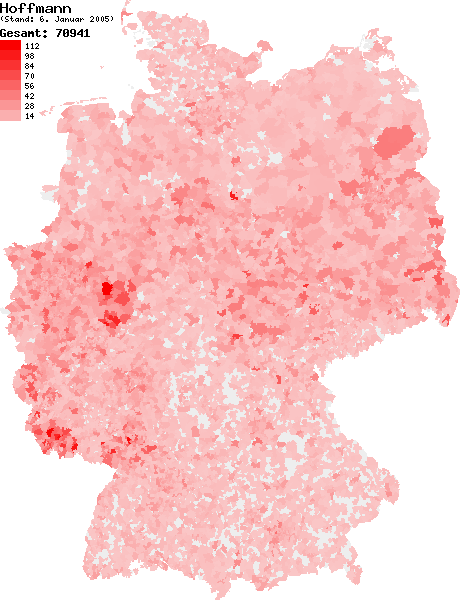
Distribution of the surname Hoffmann in Germany (2005). As a generic occupational name ("a tenant or courtier"), the name could originate independently all over Germany, although its concentration is most pronounced in Central Germany.

The most common surnames in Germany, counting different spellings together, are roughly:

1. 0,87 %: Schmidt, Schmitt, Schmitz, Schmied ("smith, blacksmith")
2. 0,83 %: Müller, Möller ("miller")
3. 0,73 %: Meyer, Meier, Meir, Meyr, Mayer, Maier, Mair, or Mayr (often the senior farmer in a given settlement [running a "full range" farmstead in terms of area, workforce and harvest, compared to various partitions of lesser size], often as the leaseholder of a landlord like an abbey, a worldly ruler, etc.; "tenant, steward, sometimes also a bailiff, but not a mayor")
4. 0,43 %: Schulz, Schulze, Schultze, Schulte, Schultheiß, Scholz ("constable")
5. 0,34 %: Schneider ("tailor")
6. 0,30 %: Hoffmann, Hofmann ("steward; tenant/leaseholder; courtier"; with the same meaning, but here not counted, are Hofer, Hoffer, Hoffner, Höfer, Höffer, Höffner, etc)
7. 0,28 %: Becker, Beck, Beckmann, Bäcker ("baker")
8. 0,27 %: Fischer ("fisherman")
9. 0,26 %: Weber ("weaver")
10. 0,23 %: Wagner ("carter, cartwright")
11. 0,21 %: Bauer, Baur ("farmer")
12. 0,1925 %: Lange, Lang ("long, tall")
13. 0,1918 %: Wolf, Wolff ("wolf")

If different spellings are counted separately, the order is different:

1. Müller
2. Schmidt
3. Schneider
4. Fischer
5. Weber
6. Meyer
7. Wagner
8. Schulz
9. Bauer
10. Becker

These ten names are all occupational names, designating common occupations around 1600 when surnames became heritable. That's why these names arose independently across Germany.

==== Austria ====
1. Gruber (5482)
2. Huber (5109)
3. Wagner (4624)
4. Mueller (4410)
5. Pichler (4227)
6. Steiner (4176)
7. Moser (4175)
8. Mayer (3901)
9. Bauer (3840)
10. Berger (3642)
11. Hofer (3549)
12. Fuchs (3251)
13. Eder (3232)
14. Leitner (3223)

=== Gender-specific surname variants ===
Traditionally, there was a differentiation of surnames of women from those of their male siblings, which was widespread in Germany until the 18th century. Thus, in old records, especially church registers on rites de passage, such as baptisms, deaths and marriages etc., women may appear bearing regionally typical female surname variants (like, in South Germany: Peter Huber, but Anna Huberin). With the establishment of general official registration of legal names, this practice was abolished in the 18th and the 19th centuries, depending on the legislation of the respective states.

Also, the spelling of given and surnames, varying previously from author to author, or even entry to entry, was then mostly fixed according to the official recorded form. Former noble titles appearing in male and female variants were transformed by the Weimar Constitution, article 109, into parts of the surnames in Germany, but a new tradition of gender-specific variants, for official registration, was established for these surnames. This practice was confirmed in a judgement by the Reichsgericht on 10 March 1926.

Colloquially, surname variants for women continue to appear in some German dialects. In Bavarian dialect surnames of women sometimes are formed by adding the ending "-in", used in standard High German to indicate noun variants for women or items of grammatical feminine gender, such as Näherin (seamstress), with Näher (seamster) being the male form. Thus a Frau (Mrs.) Gruber may be referred to as "Gruberin". In West Low German parlance the ending "…sch(e)" is sometimes added to surnames of women, related to the standard High German adjective ending "…isch" (cognitive to English "…ish"), suffixed to nouns or adjectives indicating belonging / pertaining to, being of the kind described by the suffixed word: for example, de Smidtsche, is Ms Schmidt (Smith), but literally something like the Smithian (the woman pertaining to a man/family named Schmidt).

Another form, indicating a female bearer of a surname, was the addition of a genitive "s" (like the Saxon genitive), the daughter or wife of Mr. Bäcker (literally Baker) would appear as Ms Bäckers (in German without an apostrophe), as being Bäcker's daughter or wife.

== Pseudonyms ==
Pseudonyms can be used by artists (Künstlername, "artist's name") and members of religious orders (Ordensname); If a pseudonym is widely known in public it can be added to the passport of that person (under the weaker legal status of Künstlername) and be used instead of the original name in most situations. The same field in the passport also serves to show religious names, i.e. the new name somebody takes on when becoming a monk or nun.

== Academic degrees and titles ==
The academic degree of Doktor (Dr.) and the academic title of Professor (Prof.) are not part of the name in Germany but can be entered into an identity card or passport and are frequently used in documents and addresses.

They are, however, often used in a written address (e.g., Dr. Meier, Prof. Dr. Müller), and will often be used in formal speech or sometimes by lower-ranked persons such as students, though many academics prefer being addressed just like anyone else, i.e. by Herr or Frau alone (see below).

== Hofname (estate name) ==
In rural areas it is common that farmers are known by the traditional name of their Hof (farm or estate). Because of the long-standing tradition of impartible inheritance in German-speaking Europe, ownership of a Hof had often been tied to direct patrilineal descent over centuries. Thus, farmers were traditionally known by their Hofname even before the development of the Nachname in the early modern period, and the two systems came to overlap. Many Nachnamen are in fact derived from such Hofnamen, but in some instances, the Hofname tradition survived alongside the official Nachname.

Historically, the Hofname was the first type of commoners' family name to become heritable. This process began still in the Late Middle Ages (14th to 15th century); e.g. Ulrich Zwingli (b. 1484) inherited his father's surname, in origin a Hofname (from the term Twing, denoting a type of walled-in estate) even though he did not inherit his estate.

In cases where Nachname and Hofname are not identical (usually because there was no male heir at some point in the family history) they are joined in official documents by genannt (abbr. gen.), e.g. Amann gen. Behmann. In Austria the term vulgo (abbr. vlg.) is used instead of genannt. This is called a Genanntname or vulgo name. Historically, other forms can be found as well, including Amann sonst Behmann genannt, Amann oder Behmann, an, auf, zu, alias, modo, vel, dictus, dicti, vero, qui et, or de. In some cases the form genannt changed into von over time, in other cases it was changed into a hyphenated surname (like Amann-Behmann), but these examples are not the only origins for these latter types of names.

== Name changes ==
There are only a few circumstances in which one is allowed to change one's name:

1. On marriage: the couple can choose the name of either partner, they can both keep their original names, or (provided the original family name of neither partner contains a hyphen), one partner can modify their own name, appending the partner's family name to their own, creating a hyphenated name ("Mr. Schmid and Ms. Meier-Schmid" or "Mr. Schmid-Meier and Ms. Meier").
2. Correction of a name: if the state has made an error with the name and this can be proven, the original name can be restored. Example: "Maſs" became "Mahs" and is corrected to "Mass".
3. Gender reassignment, in the case of transsexuals.
4. Naturalization of foreigners (per Article 47 of the EGBGB). In this case, the foreigners may choose to adopt German forms of their first and last names, or adopt new first names if their old first names cannot be adapted into German.
5. Changing a name that is too complicated (too long or difficult spelling because of origin), too common (like Müller or Schmidt), or causes ridicule (which can be because of the name itself, like "Fick" ("Fuck", even though of different etymologic origin), or because of association, like "Adolf").

Though the Namensänderungsgesetz (Law concerning the changing of names) allows changing because of any "important reason", in practice this will very rarely be allowed.

Adding Doktor (Ph.D.) in Germany, and adding any academic degree in Austria, into one's identity card or passport is not considered a name change.

== Order of names and use of articles ==
The Nachname is put after the Vorname. In the rural use of several regions where heavy dialect is spoken (i.e. Bavaria, Saxony, the Palatinate or the Saarland), the order is reversed, e.g. "der Mühlbach Klaus" instead of "Klaus Mühlbach". The definite article is always added in this style of naming. Especially in these regions, it is also the usual administrative way, but with a comma; the said person would appear in documents as "Mühlbach, Klaus" or even, with a title or profession "Mühlbach, Klaus, Dr./OLt/Bäcker".

Except for Southern Germany, usage of the definite article with the name outside of dialect is uncommon, and considered a mistake in Standard German. It is considered familiar language, but not as a mark of rough, rural manners as in French. It is used especially when talking of and/or with children, but also in some other situations. E.g., Ich bin der Nils ('I am the Nils').

In Austria, the definite article is always used in informal spoken language, but most of the time not in very formal or written language.

In some dialects (such as those spoken in the Western Palatinate, the Saarland and parts of the Rhineland), the article used with women's and girls' names is not the feminine, but the neuter article. This is because the German word for "girl", Mädchen, is a neuter noun, due to the diminutive suffix -chen.

== See also ==
- Ashkenazi Jewish name
- Germanic name
- English name
- German Kevinism
- de:Deutsche Familiennamen
