= Heinrich Fürst zu Fürstenberg =

German landowner (1950–2024)

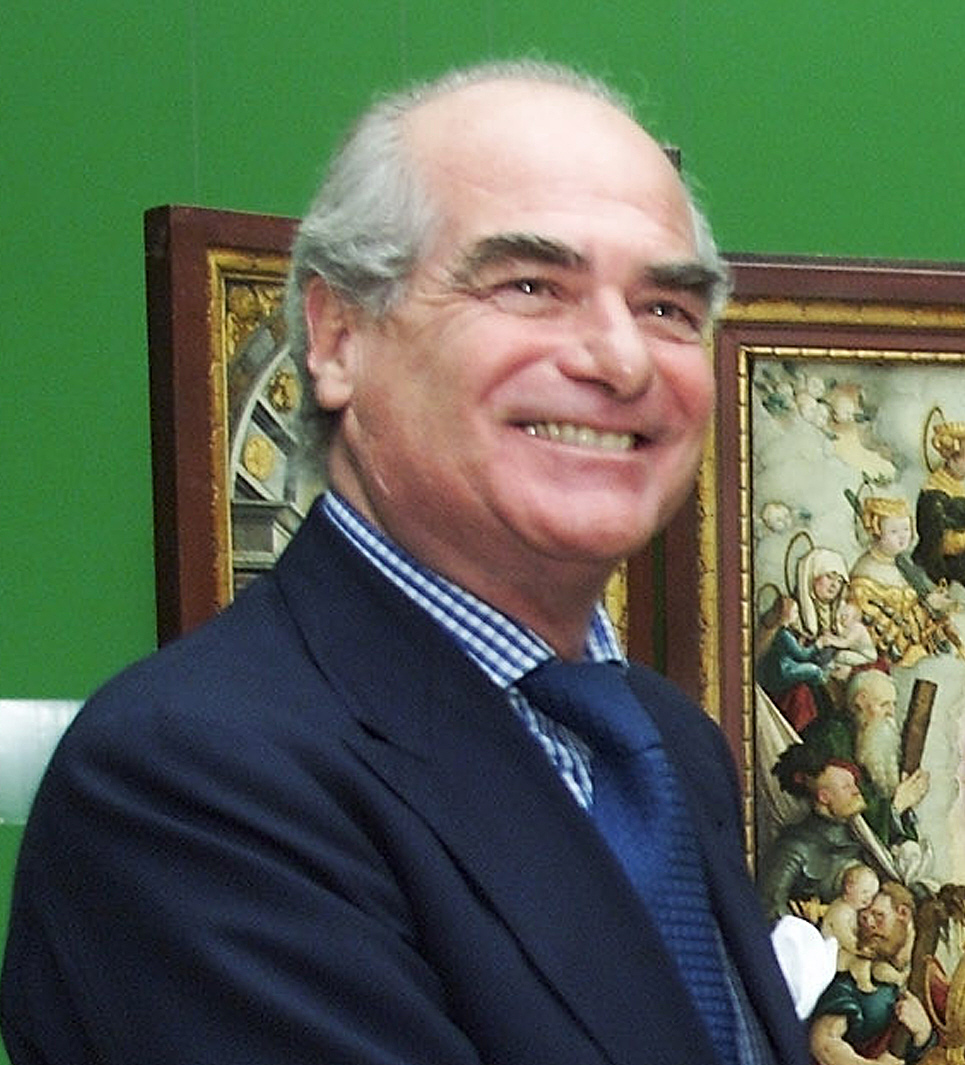
- Fürstenberg in 2002

Head of the House of Fürstenberg
- Tenure: 9 July 2002– 11 July 2024
- Predecessor: Joachim Egon
- Successor: Christian
- Born: Heinrich Maximilian Egon Karl Prinz zu Fürstenberg; 17 July 1950; Schloss Heiligenberg, Heiligenberg, Baden, West Germany
- Died: 11 July 2024 (aged 73)
- Spouse: Maximiliane Prinzessin zu Windisch-Graetz (m. 1976)
- Issue: Christian, Prince of Fürstenberg; Prince Antonius
- House: Fürstenberg
- Father: Joachim Egon Fürst zu Fürstenberg
- Mother: Paula Gräfin von Königsegg-Aulendorf
- Religion: Christian (Roman Catholic)

Heinrich Maximilian Egon Karl Fürst zu Fürstenberg (17 July 1950 – 11 July 2024) was a German landowner and head of the former princely House of Fürstenberg from 2002 to 2024.

== Early years ==
Heinrich Fürst zu Fürstenberg was born in 1950 at Schloss Heiligenberg in Heiligenberg, Germany. He was the eldest son of Joachim Egon Fürst zu Fürstenberg (1923-2002), and his wife, Paula Gräfin von Königsegg-Aulendorf (1926-2019). He studied economics at the University of Vienna.

== Career ==
Fürstenberg's father died in 2002, and he assumed the role as head of the House of Fürstenberg at that time. He owned and managed the family businesses, which include landholdings and beer brewing.

The Fürstenberg family manages 18,000 hectares of forest in the southwest of Germany. The family was granted the right to brew beer in 1283 by Rudolf I of Germany and has been in the business ever since. In 2005, Fürstenberg joined the Fürstenberg Brewery with Brau Holding International.

== Personal life and family ==
In 1976, Fürstenberg married his second cousin, Maximiliane Prinzessin zu Windisch-Graetz, in Rome, Italy. In 1977, their first child, Christian, was born. In 1985, their second child, Antonius, was born.

In September 2010, his elder son married Jeannette Griesel. His younger son married Matilde dei Principi Borromeo Arese Taverna in 2011.

In 2012, he was added to the International Best Dressed Hall of Fame.

Fürstenberg died following a long illness on 11 July 2024, at the age of 73. He was succeeded as head of the house by his elder son, Christian Fürst zu Fürstenberg.
