= Heintze =

Heintze is a surname. Notable people with the surname include:

- August Heintze (1881–1941), Swedish botanist
- Horst Heintze (1927–1997), German politician
- Jan Heintze (born 1963), Danish football player
- Marion Heintze (born 1954), German chess master
- Roland Heintze (born 1973), German politician
- Wilhelm Heintze (1849–1895), Swedish organist, music educator, and music conductor
