= Schwarzenegger (disambiguation) =

Arnold Schwarzenegger (born 1947) is an Austrian and American actor, businessman, filmmaker, former politician, and former professional bodybuilder.

Schwarzenegger may also refer to:

- Schwarzenegger (surname), famous people called Schwarzenegger
- Schwarzenegger (album), a 2011 album by Alexandros
- Perry v. Schwarzenegger, also known as Hollingsworth v. Perry and Perry v. Brown, a series of United States federal court cases that legalized same-sex marriage in the State of California
- Arnold Schwarzenegger Classic, also known as Arnold Sports Festival, an annual multi-sport event consisting of professional bodybuilding (known specifically as Arnold Classic), strongman (also known as Arnold Strongman Classic), fitness, figure and bikini weekend expo
