= Netzel =

German surname

Origin
- Language: German
- Meaning: "In need;distress"
- Region of origin: Poland Germany

Netzel is a German surname. Sources differ about its origin and meaning.

- A toponymic surname derived from Nesse.
- An occupational surname derived from netz (net), for people who worked with fishing nets.
- A patronymic surname derived from Nato or Norbert.
- A nickname for a person in need or distress, also written as Nötzel, derived from not (hardship, distress, suffering).

== People with the surname ==
- Laura Netzel (1839—1927), Swedish composer
- Milo Netzel (1886–1938), American baseball player
- Wilhelm Netzel (1834–1914), Swedish gynecologist and obstetrician
