= Rothaus =

German brewery

Badische Staatsbrauerei Rothaus AG
- Interactive map of Badische Staatsbrauerei Rothaus AG
- Type: State-owned corporation
- Location: Grafenhausen, Baden-Württemberg, Germany
- Coordinates: 47°47′47″N 8°14′44″E
- Opened: 1791
- Key people: Christian Rasch, Thomas Schäuble
- Annual production volume: 790,000 hectolitres (670,000 US bbl) in 2012
- Revenue: €89.2 million (2008)
- Operating income: €16.4 million (2014)
- Owner: state of Baden-Württemberg
- Employees: 236 in 2014
- Website: www.rothaus.de

Active beers
Name	Type
Tannenzäpfle	German-style Pilsner
Alkoholfrei Tannenzäpfle	Non-alcoholic Pilsner
Rothaus Pils	German-style Pilsner
Märzen Export	Märzen
Radler	Radler
Hefeweizen	Wheat beer
Alkoholfrei Hefeweizen	Non-alcoholic wheat beer

Badische Staatsbrauerei Rothaus is a brewery owned by the German state of Baden-Württemberg. Rothaus, at the northern edge of the village of Grafenhausen in the southern Black Forest, is one of Germany's most successful and profitable regional breweries.

== History ==
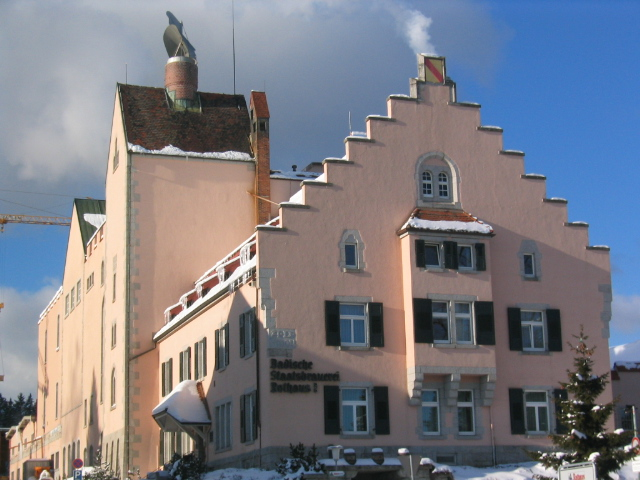
Administrative building of the Rothaus brewery

Rothaus received its name from the patrician family "Roth", which originated from the region of Klettgau and settled down in Grafenhausen around 1300. In 1340, they began the construction of their homestead there, the "Rothe Haus" (Ger.: "The Red House"). In 1660, the house was sold to a man named Michael Kaiser who proceeded to turn it into an inn after obtaining a liquor license from the Benedictine monastery of St. Blasien. The order itself bought the premises 100 years later and reconstructed it.

Under the leadership of Martin Gerbert, prince-abbot of the abbey, the monks' council decided in late 1790 to start attempts of brewing in January 1791. Gerbert's intention was to enhance the status of his lordship of Bonndorf over the nearby princedom of Fürstenberg. Fürstenberg had been in possession of a brewing license since the 13th century and later originated the "Fürstlich Fürstenbergische Brauerei" (Fürstenberg Brewery). Additionally, the brewery was a measure of economic promotion, as it was intended to create employment and to counteract the allegedly overpriced beer from Donaueschingen. However, there were claims that the monks had only wanted to suppress the drinking of liquor by those living in the Black Forest.

Considering the nearby towns of St. Blasien and Bonndorf, the location of the brewery was very convenient in terms of infrastructure; it was surrounded by large areas covered with woods and an abundance of fresh water. This enabled the starting of an extensive brewery firm. To this day, the brewing water is extracted from seven in-house wells.

Through the process of secularization, the possession of the monastery and its properties was transferred to the Grand Duchy of Baden in 1806. Since then, the brewery has been known as the Großherzoglich Badische Staatsbrauerei Rothaus (Grand ducal state-owned brewery of Baden). The November Revolution of 1918, which led to the abolition of the monarchy in Baden, caused the company to shorten their name to Badische Staatsbrauerei Rothaus (State-owned brewery of Baden), as from then on the brewery was owned by the state of Baden. Since 1922, the company has had the legal form of a stock corporation, the shares of which are held by the associated company of the state of Baden-Württemberg.

Between 1920 and 1933, Max Jäger, later mayor of the city of Rastatt, was the Rothaus brewery's manager. Under CEO Norbert Nothhelfer, who had previously been a district president of Freiburg, Rothaus doubled its beer sales in a shrinking market in the 1990s. Capacity was increased to one million hectolitres per year. In 1992, Rothaus acquired the Dominican Island of Constance including the island resort on it, which is leased to the Steigenberger Hotel Group. On 1 October 2004, Thomas Schäuble, former Minister of the Interior of Baden-Württemberg, became CEO of the brewery.

In the fiscal year 2006, the brewery achieved a production volume of 937,000 hectoliters and revenue of 88.2 million Euros, making it the second largest brewery in the state after Eichbaum. Approximately 90 percent of the brewery's sales are made in Baden-Württemberg.

Near the end of 2007, Rothaus acquired the hotel next to the brewery area and set up a fan shop there. Within an area of about one hectare a small adventure park containing the Zäpfleweg, which opened in 2008, as well as a playground, were created. In addition, state road 170 was relocated and a roundabout was built in order to make it more attractive as a destination. As of 2011, a total of 232 people are employed in Rothaus and its two sales offices.

After Thomas Schäuble became ill, Gerhard Stratthaus, former Finance Minister of Baden-Württemberg, took over the management of the brewery on 5 September 2012. Since 1 July 2013, the company has been managed by Christian Rasch.

Rasch is the first nonpolitician in decades to be the manager of the brewery. It used to be common practice for former state governments to fill state-owned enterprises' leadership positions with former politicians. This practice, however, sparked much public criticism. Agriculture minister Alexander Bonde arranged the first job advertisement for this position. Egon Zehnder's Swiss headhunter company was hired to assist with the job advertisement. Rasch had been sales and marketing manager of the Stuttgarter Hofbräu brewery since 2008, and became the management's spokesperson in 2010. The newspaper "Stuttgarter Zeitung" described Rasch's switch from Stuttgarter Hofbräu to Rothaus as "spectacular" because to the circumstances under which it happened.

In 2016, the brand "Tannenzäpfle" celebrated its 60th year of existence with a sixtieth anniversary edition of the original 1956 label design.

== Products ==
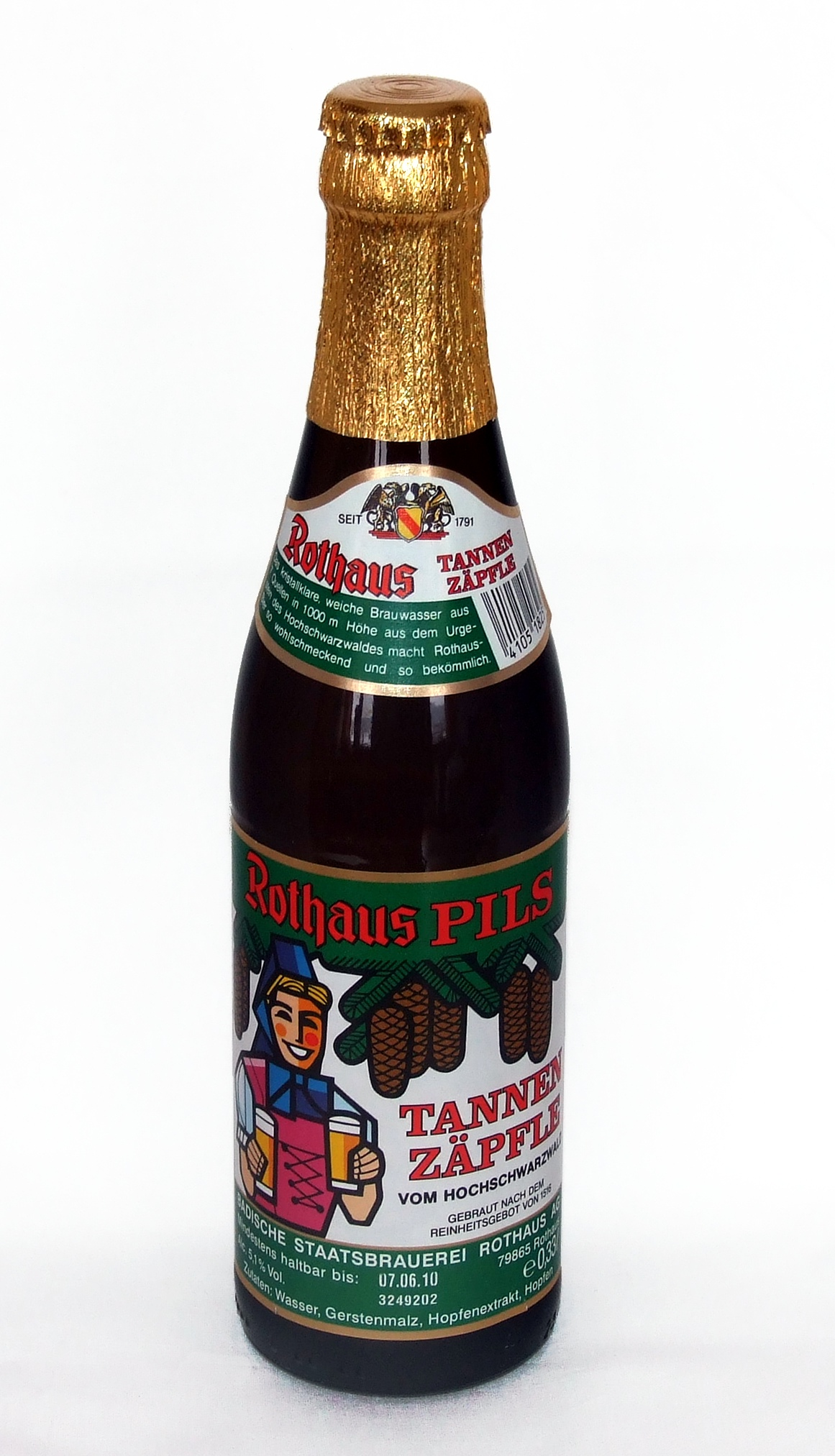
Bottle Tannenzäpfle

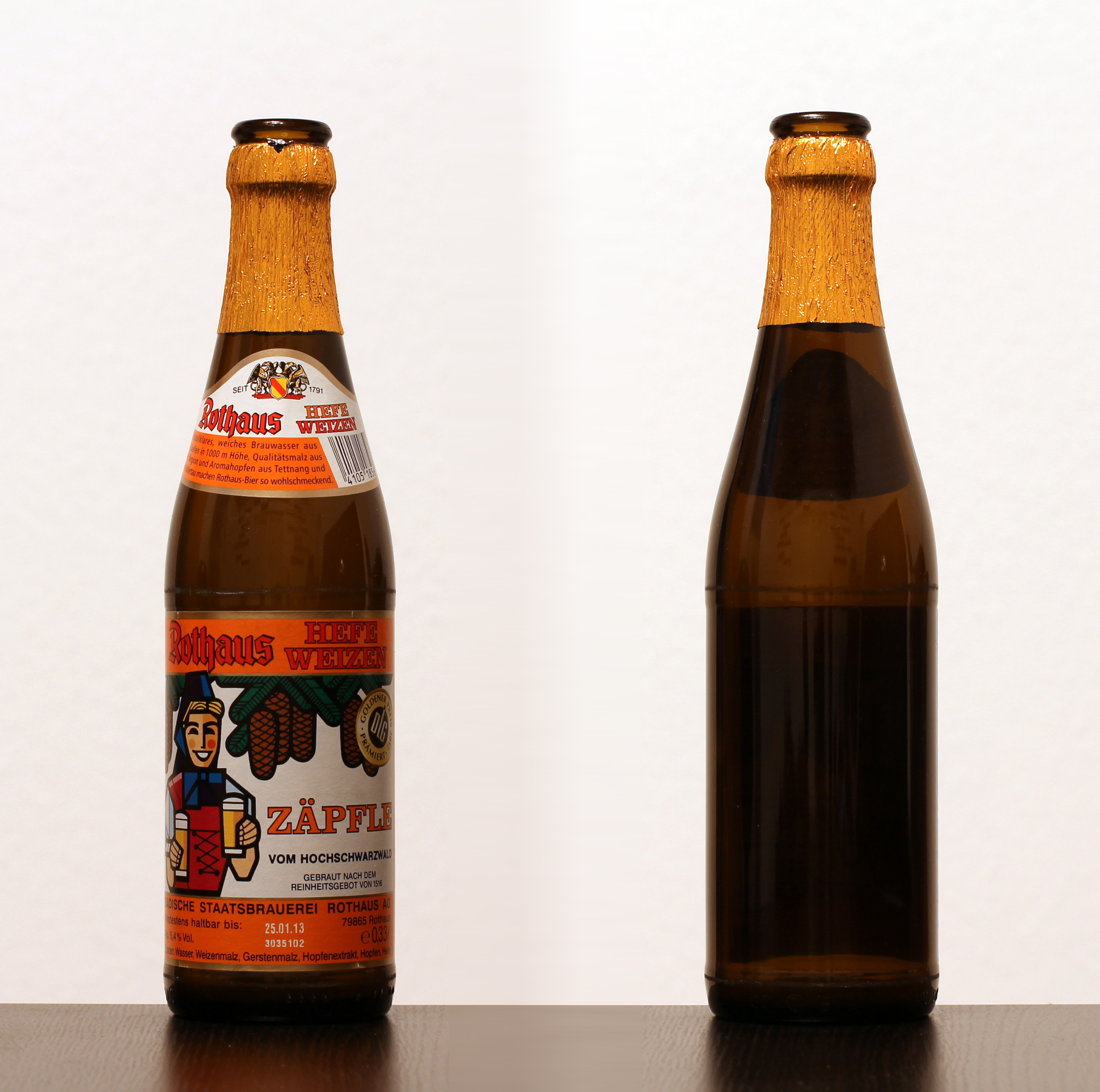
Rothaus Hefeweizen Zäpfle

The brewery's most successful product, a Pilsner-style beer, "Rothaus Tannenzäpfle" or simply "Zäpfle", is sold in 33 cl (12 imp fl oz; 11 US fl oz) bottles and is available in stores throughout Baden-Württemberg. It is well known as a "cult beer" throughout Germany and is sold in supermarkets, kiosks and various nightlife establishments. Tannenzäpfle literally means "little fir cone" and is a reference to the shape of the bottle. Despite Rothaus refraining from intensive advertising campaigns, the demand for the once-local beer has spread throughout Germany.

=== Label ===
The bottle label displays a blonde girl in a traditional garb, holding a beer in each of her hands. Fans of the beer started to call her "Biergit Kraft" which is a play on words in the local dialect of Alemannic. "Bier git Kraft", ("Bier gibt Kraft") translates to "beer gives [you] strength". By now, the brewery also uses the name in commercials.

Also depicted on the Tannenzäpfle label are seven fir cones which lead to the beers name. Instead of hanging downwards as in the image, in nature these cones grow upwards from their branches. The inverted position of the cones is commonly noted to be similar to the position of a bottle while it is being consumed. In reality however, the cones depicted on the label are probably the seeds of the Norway spruce, which naturally grows in the Black Forest and has its cones hanging down from its branches.

The label has been in use since 1972. The girl and fir cones were introduced in the first label in 1956 as part of a photorealistic illustration. The original label was used again as a limited edition in 2006 on the occasion of the 50th anniversary of the brand.

=== Advertising ===
Rothaus advertises throughout the German states of Baden-Württemberg, Rhineland-Palatinate, North Rhine-Westphalia, Hamburg and Hesse, though it completely avoids the usage of TV and radio commercials. The company sponsors sports clubs such as, among others, SC Freiburg, Karlsruher SC, FC Nöttingen, VfR Aalen and Wölfe Freiburg as well as various events throughout the region. It holds the naming rights for the venues of the Messe Friedrichshafen (Rothaus Halle) and Messe Freiburg (Rothaus-Arena from 2007-2016), and also for the park of the Messe Stuttgart (Rothauspark). In other sports, the brewery is the main sponsor of the Rothaus cycling team and of HSG Konstanz, a handball team currently playing in the second division of the Handball-Bundesliga. Through sponsorship it also lends its name to the Rothaus Regio-Tour.

Rothaus was involved in the construction of the Rothaus-Zäpfle-Turm, which is an observation tower near the township of Höchenschwand. It also owns two refrigerator cars resembling railway carriages which are parked in Seebrugg at the Bundesstraße 500 and work as a permanent advertisement – at the exact spot, where the road branches off to Rothaus.

The region in which the brewery is located has branded itself "Rothauser Land – Meine Ferienregion im Schwarzwald" (my vacation destination in the Black Forest) since 2006. The main cities of "Rothauser Land" are Grafenhausen and Ühlingen-Birkendorf. Rothauser Land has incorporated the brewery’s characters into its logo.

== Economic significance ==
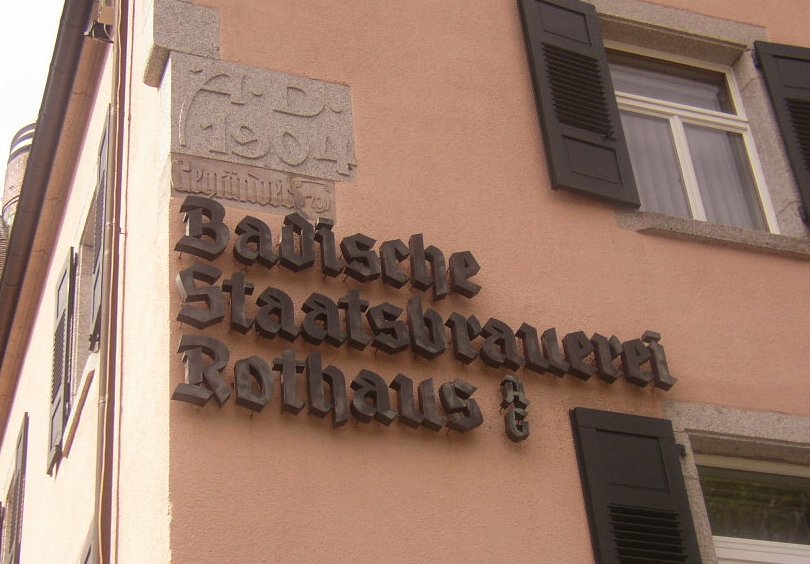
Text on the administrative building

In the 1990s, at a time with decreasing beer consumption by Germans, the brewery experienced a doubling of its output under the direction of the chairman of the board, Norbert Nothelfer, who had previously been employed in a position comparable to governor of a sub-division of a state. The capacity was increased to one million hectoliters of beer. In the business year 2008, the brewery produced 941,000 hectolitres (802,000 US bbl) of beer, grossing roughly €89.2 million. In 2011, the output was 838,000 hectolitres (714,000 US bbl).

The company is an important employer in the otherwise economically weak area of the south-central Black Forest. In 2008, the brewery employed 230 people and paid €17 million as dividends to its owner, the state of Baden-Württemberg. It also paid €16.7 million in tax. Next to Fürstenberg Brewery, it is one of the two larger breweries in the south-west of Baden-Württemberg.
