= Schörghuber Unternehmensgruppe =

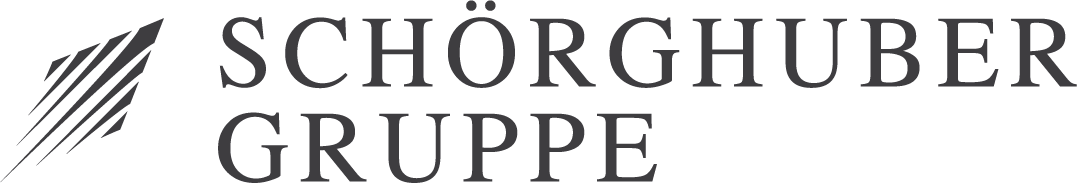
- Trade name: Schörghuber
- Type: Kommanditgesellschaft
- Founded: 1954; 72 years ago
- Headquarters: Munich, Bavaria, Germany
- Key people: Nico Nusmeier (Chairman of the Board of Management); Alexandra Schörghuber (Chairwoman of the Board of Trustees)
- Revenue: €771 million (2018)
- Owner: Schörghuber Stiftung & Co. Holding KG
- Number of employees: 2,766
- Website: www.sug-munich.com/en

Schörghuber Unternehmensgruppe (SUG) is a company owned by Schörghuber Stiftung & Co. Holding KG (SHKG). It operates nationally and internationally in the fields of beverages, hotels, salmon farming and processing, construction and real estate.

== History ==
In 1954 Josef Schörghuber founded a property developer and real estate business in Munich, Bayerische Hausbau GmbH & Co. KG. At the end of the 1950s, he entered the commercial aviation business, the foundation of the former aircraft leasing division (until 2011). In 1969, the company entered the hotel business with the operation of the Arabella Hochhaus in Munich. In 1978, Schörghuber took over the prefabricated house manufacturer Hanse Haus.

At the end of the 1970s, Unternehmensgruppe took over Heilmann & Littmann Bau-AG. In 1980, the company decided to merge with KG Sager & Woerner to form Heilit+Woerner Bau-AG, but sold it to Walter Bau AG in 1988 for a symbolic price of one mark.

At the end of the 1970s, Schörghuber entered the beer business by purchasing the Hacker-Pschorr and Paulaner breweries. After Josef Schörghuber's death in 1995, his son Stefan Schörghuber, who had been working in the hotel and mountain railways sector in the company since 1984, took over the company. Since the death of Stefan Schörghuber on 25 November 2008, his widow Alexandra Schörghuber has been running the company.

== Activities ==
=== Beverages ===
The group's beverage holdings are managed by the Paulaner Brauerei Gruppe, which it owns jointly with Heineken. It was formed in 2017 when Brau Holding International, the earlier joint venture, merged with its subsidiary Paulaner. Heineken's stake fell from 49.9 to 30 percent. Its breweries include Paulaner and Kulmbacher.

=== Hotels ===
In 1998 the group's hotel subsidiary, Arabella Hotel Holding, formed a joint venture with Starwood Hotels to market 31 hotels in Germany, Austria, Switzerland, Mallorca and South Africa under the Sheraton and Four Points brands. In January 2007 the agreement was extended until 2037, and the joint venture was renamed ArabellaStarwood Hotels & Resorts.

=== Construction and real estate ===
Bayerische Hausbau combines the group's property development and real estate holdings. In 2023 it was split into two legally separate sister companies, Bayerische Hausbau Development and Bayerische Hausbau Real Estate. The real estate company portfolio valued at about €3.6 billion.

=== Seafood ===
In 2001 the Schörghuber family acquired a 51 percent stake in Productos del Mar Ventisqueros, a salmon farmer in Chilean Patagonia, and took full ownership in 2010. On 1 July 2011 the company was transferred from the family's private holdings into the group as its fourth business area.
