= Würzburger Hofbräu =

German brewery

Würzburger Hofbräu GmbH
- Location: Würzburg, Germany
- Coordinates: 49.7919°N 9.9150°E
- Opened: 1643
- Annual production volume: 250,000 hectolitres (210,000 US bbl) in 2016
- Owned by: Kulmbacher Brewery
- Employees: 70 (2016)
- Parent: Brau Holding International
- Website: wuerzburger-hofbraeu.de

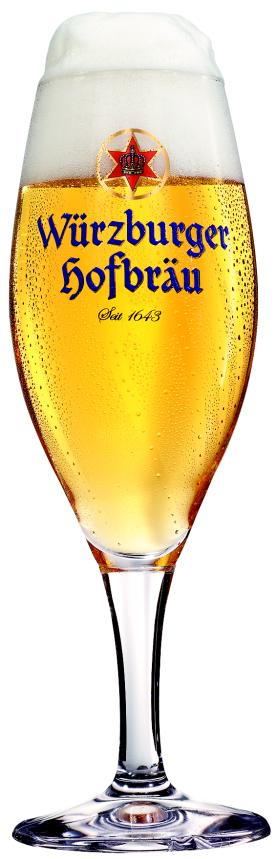
Glass showing the brewery's logo

The Würzburg Hofbräu is the only brewery in Würzburg, Germany. It was founded in 1643 by the Franconian Prince-Bishop Johann Philipp von Schönborn and is deeply rooted in the region of Lower Franconia. At that time there were many Swedish soldiers in Würzburg, who had emptied most of the wine stores of the city. Prince Bishop von Schönborn founded the brewery. As the brewery was a good source of income, it was also supported by his successor bishops. In memory of the founder of the brewery, the crown of the prince bishop decorates the brewery logo.

During the 19th-century, the Würzburg Hofbräuhaus became an internationally active company. It exported in 1887 as one of the first German breweries in the United States. As of 2011 it exports to buyers of brewery products in the United States, Italy and China. The Würzburg Hofbräuhaus is primarily a regional brewery in Lower Franconia.

Since 1993, the brewery was technically modernized and expanded in subsequent years through strategic acquisitions. In 1999, the takeover of the royal brewery Wächstersbach and Wernerbräu GmbH 2011 Lohrer was feeding the brewery, which today is called Tusker beer GmbH. Since 2005, the Würzburg Hofbräuhaus GmbH is owned by the Kulmbacher Brewery, a subsidiary of Brau Holding International.
