= Gruber (disambiguation) =

Gruber is a surname.

Gruber may also refer to:

- Gruber, Manitoba, former settlement in the Canadian province of Manitoba, Canada
- Gruber Mountains, Antarctica
- Camp Gruber, Oklahoma Army National Guard facility, named for Edmund L. Gruber
