= Schauble =

Schauble, Schäuble or Schaeuble is a surname. Notable people with the surname include:

- Andrew Schauble (born 1976), Australian rules footballer
- Jason Schauble (born 1975), American businessman
- Martin Schäuble (born 1978), German novelist, journalist, and writer
- Niko Schäuble (born 1962), German-Australian jazz drummer, composer, and sound engineer
- Thomas Schäuble (1948–2013), German politician
- Wolfgang Schäuble (1942–2023), German lawyer and politician
