= Alexandra Schörghuber =

German entrepreneur (born 1958)

- Born: Alexandra Stumpf; 24 July 1958 (age 67); Frankfurt, Hesse, West Germany
- Spouse: Stefan Schörghuber (m. 1988; died 2008)
- Children: 3

Alexandra Schörghuber (née Stumpf; (born 24 July 1958) is a German entrepreneur.

== Personal life ==
Schörghuber was born as the daughter of a Protestant pastor in Frankfurt. She grew up in Erlenbach am Main and in Straubing. After graduating from high school, she completed an apprenticeship as a hotel clerk and then worked in Germany, Switzerland and Bermuda. During her work, she got to know Stefan Schörghuber, who was then junior manager of the Schörghuber Unternehmensgruppe. The wedding took place on 20 July 1988.

Alexandra and Stefan Schörghuber have three children. The family ran a riding stable with 30 horses on Gut Bohmerhof in Wackersberg. After Stefan's death in 2008, Schörghuber married her second husband Bernd Werndl in 2015.

== Entrepreneur ==
Schörghuber has been chairwoman of the board of trustees and a member of the noard of directors of the Schörghuber Unternehmensgruppe in Munich since December 2008. After the death of her husband Stefan Schörghuber on 25 November 2008, she took over responsibility for the family business. Before that, she had held numerous supervisory board and management tasks in the family's private sector, which included parking garages, lifts and cable cars in the Bavarian Oberland and one of the largest salmon rearing facilities in Chile.

In March 2008, Schörghuber was appointed Vice President of Arabella Hotelbetriebe AG in Switzerland. In April 2008, she also took over Arabella Vermögensverwaltung AG, based in Chur. Since 22 February 2013, she has been a member of the Administrative Advisory Board of FC Bayern München e. V. and was elected vice-chairman three years later.

== Personal wealth ==
On the Forbes list in 2018, Schörghuber's net worth was estimated at US$ 4.9 billion, ranked 436th worldwide and 40th in Germany.

== Social commitment ==
In May 2018, Schörghuber, FC Bayern player Thomas Müller and Martina Münch-Nicolaidis announced that a so-called "Star House" is to be created, which is to serve as a central contact point for children and young adults who have lost a close relative or one or both parents.

Schörghuber is also the patron of the non-profit Josef-Schörghuber-Stiftung für Münchner Kinder. It was started by her father-in-law, Josef Schörghuber, in 1995. It enables children from socially disadvantaged families to take part in vacation and leisure activities.
