= Töpfer =

Töpfer, also spelled as Toepfer, is a German surname meaning potter.

== People ==
- Alfred Toepfer (1894–1993), German entrepreneur, founder of Alfred Toepfer Stiftung F.V.S.
- Antje Töpfer (born 1968), German politician
- Ernst Toepfer (1877–1955), German painter
- Johann Gottlob Töpfer (1791–1870), German organist
- Klaus Töpfer (1938–2024), German politician
- Tomáš Töpfer (born 1951), Czech actor and politician

== See also ==
- Potter (surname)
