= Stefan Schörghuber =

German businessman (1961–2008)

Stefan Schörghuber (6 July 1961 – 25 November 2008) was a German businessman.

Schörghuber was the owner of the Schörghuber Unternehmensgruppe in Munich, Germany. After his father Josef’s death in 1995, he took over the business, restructured it, and expanded it. The business, which is organised under the holding company Schörghuber Stiftung & Co. Holding KG, is active in the drinks, building and property, aircraft leasing, and hotel industries.

Stefan Schörghuber’s wealth was estimated by Forbes to be US$2.8 billion in 2006, making him number 245, and later US$ 3.5 Billion, making him number 307 in the List of Billionaires.

Schörghuber was married, had three children and lived in Munich. Together with his wife, Alexandra, he was active in the “Josef-Schörghuber-Stiftung für Münchner Kinder”, a charitable organisation for socially deprived children and their families in Munich.

Together with Konrad Bernheimer, he established a collection of old masters which formed the Schloss Fuschl Collection.
