= Schwartzkopff =

Schwartzkopff may refer to:

- Schwartzkopff-Eckhardt II bogie, a mechanical device
- L. Schwartzkopff, a German locomotive manufacturer, later Berliner Maschinenbau AG
- Schwartzkopff torpedo, a series of torpedoes in use at least 1873-1900, made by Berliner Maschinenbau AG

== People with the surname ==
- Louis Victor Robert Schwartzkopff (1825–1892), German businessman

== See also ==
- Schwarzkopf (disambiguation)
