= Mauritz Gisiko =

Swedish pianist and music educator

Mauritz Gisiko (1794 - 1863) was a Swedish pianist and music educator. His notable students included Laura Netzel.
