= Klingemann =

Klingemann is a German occupational surname, which means "knife maker" or "weapons smith", from the German word Klinge, meaning "blade". The name may refer to:

- Ernst August Friedrich Klingemann (1777–1831), German writer
- Felix Klingemann (1863–1944), German chemist
- Mario Klingemann, German artist
