= Schwarzkopf =

Schwarzkopf ("black head" in German) may refer to:

== Companies ==
- Hans Schwarzkopf GmbH, a beauty care company
- Schwarzkopf & Schwarzkopf Verlag, a German publishing house

== Mountains ==
- Schwarzkopf (Bavarian Forest), a mountain in Bavaria, Germany
- Schwarzkopf (Spessart), a mountain in Bavaria, Germany
- Schwarzkopf, the German name for Čerchov, a mountain in the Upper Palatine Forest, Czech Republic
- Schwarzkopf, a mountain of the Ankogel Group in Austria

== People ==
- Anton Schwarzkopf (1924–2001), German roller coaster designer and head of Schwarzkopf GmbH
- Elisabeth Schwarzkopf (1915–2006), German-born Austrian/British soprano opera singer and recitalist
- Franz Schwarzkopf (1927–20??), German roller coaster designer
- Hans Schwarzkopf (1874–1921), German chemist
- Klaus Schwarzkopf (1922–1991), German actor
- Lilli Schwarzkopf (born 1983), German heptathlete
- Lyall Schwarzkopf (born 1931), Minnesota politician
- Marianna Schwarzkopf, American actress known by the name of Marianna Hill, cousin of Norman Schwarzkopf
- Norman Schwarzkopf Sr. (1895–1958), first superintendent of the New Jersey state police
- Norman Schwarzkopf Jr. (1934–2012), United States Army general, leader of coalition forces in the 1991 Gulf War
- Otfried Schwarzkopf, now Otfried Cheong, German computational geometer working in South Korea
- Paul Schwarzkopf (1886–1970), Austrian pioneer of powder metallurgy, recipient of the Wilhelm Exner Medal

== See also ==
- Schwartzkopff (disambiguation)
- Air Force Base Swartkop, a South African air force base and museum
