= Horst Heintze =

- Born: 15 August 1927; Halle, Province of Saxony, Prussia, Germany
- Died: 14 December 1997 (aged 70)
- Occupations: Trades Union official Politician
- Political party: NSDAP; SED

Horst Heintze (15 August 1927 – 14 December 1997) was a German trades union official and politician. Through the union movement he rose to become a member of the People's Chamber (Volkskammer) in the German Democratic Republic and, from 1963, a member of the powerful Party Central Committee. He was unusual in rising this far through the power structure of the country despite having been a Nazi Party member in his youth.

== Life ==
Horst Heinte was born into a working-class family in Halle, a substantial city in the northern half of what then counted as central Germany. Between 1942 and 1944 he trained for industrial work in the metal-based industry sector. On 20 April 1944, like many Hitler Youth members born in 1926/27, he was recruited into the country's ruling Nazi Party.

War ended in defeat for Germany in May 1945. Halle was now administered as part of the Soviet occupation zone, applying a reconfigured set of internal and external frontiers agreed between the winning powers a few months earlier. Trades unions were no longer banned and in 1945 Horst Heintze joined the recently established Free German Trades Union Federation (FDGB / Freier Deutscher Gewerkschaftsbund ). Two years later, in 1947, which was the year of his twentieth birthday, he became a member of the newly formed Socialist Unity Party (SED / Sozialistische Einheitspartei Deutschlands). Between 1945 and 1948 he returned to factory work in the metals-based sector, working in a southern quarter of Halle. In 1948/49 he also served as FDGB Secretary for the Halle district union executive. moving on to serve between 1949 and 1952 as FDGB regional First Secretary for the whole of Saxony-Anhalt. In the meantime, in October 1949 the Soviet occupation zone had been re-established as the Soviet sponsored German Democratic Republic, a standalone German state with constitutional arrangements closely modeled on those of the Soviet Union itself. In 1952/53 he served as chairman of the FDGB regional leadership for Magdeburg.

In 1953 he began a study course at the "Karl Marx" Party Academy. After studying full-time for a year, he switched in 1954 to a correspondence course, concluding with a degree in Social science in 1962. Between 1954 and 1958 he served as deputy chairman of the "IG Metallurgie" trades union, and from 1958 till 1961 as deputy chairman of IG Metall (East Germany) which at this time was the largest single component union in the FDGB, between February and May 1960 briefly serving as the acting chairman of IG Metall. Although individual trades unions continued to exist in the German Democratic Republic, the country's Soviet-style centralised power structure meant that union power was heavily centralised in the Trades Union Congress (FDGB / Freier Deutscher Gewerkschaftsbund). This meant that as his career progressed Horst Heintze's FDGB work increasingly correlated with increased political influence nationally. In 1961 he briefly headed up the Economics Department of the FDGB Executive, before becoming in 1961 both a member of its presidium and of its National Executive Secretariat, memberships he retained till 1989. Through these positions, his responsibilities on the FDGB Executive included Economic Matters, Work and Wages. Between 1965 and 1967 he undertook a further period of study at the Berlin Economics Academy, which led him to a degree in Economics. He was also a member of the editorial board for the newspaper, "Die Arbeit" ("Work").

Government in East Germany was controlled by the ruling SED (party) not because all the other political parties had been banned, but because a structure had been created that enabled SED to specify the other parties' (fixed) quotas of seats in the national legislature (Volkskammer) and to control what they did. In addition to these so-called Bloc parties, certain approved Mass Organisations also received quotas of seats in the Volkskammer. East Germany's constitutional arrangements closely followed those of the Soviet Union, which had been devised by Lenin. The presence of mass movements in the legislature was intended to indicate a broadening of popular support for the legislative programme of the ruling party, and it diluted the presence of other political parties which, especially in the early years, were not always quite as thoroughly "domesticated" as the authorities wished. One of the Mass Organisations represented in the Volkskammer was the Trades Union Congress (FDGB / Freier Deutscher Gewerkschaftsbund). For the 1976 legislative period the FDGB's received quota of 68 seats in the 500 seat Volkskammer. Horst Heintze occupied one of the FDGB seats in the national legislature from 1976 till March 1990. As a member of the chamber he also served as deputy chairman of the assembly's Committee for Industry, Construction and Transport.

Nevertheless, under a constitutional structure that insisted on the leading role of The Party, ultimate political power lay not with the national legislature (Volkskammer) but with the ruling party. It often happened that the same individuals exercised positions of power in both institutions which leaves the distinction looking academic. Nevertheless, in 1963, the year of his 36th birthday, Horst Heintze became one of the 121 members of the Party Central Committee, and it was primarily as a result of this membership, which he retained till 1989, that Heintze exercised significant political influence at a national level.

The breach of the Berlin Wall in November 1989, together with the realisation that Soviet troops in East Germany had no instructions violently to suppress the rising tide of popular protests against the regime, opened the way for a series of events that would lead to the demise, as a standalone one-party dictatorship, of the German Democratic Republic and, in October 1990, to German reunification. In the meantime, during November and December 1989 there were numerous resignations from positions of political power: this included the resignation of the Party Central Committee. During these final months of 1989 Horst Heintze was one many comrades relieved of all party and trades union functions.
