= Wilhelm Netzel =

Swedish gynecologist and obstetrician

Nils Wilhelm Netzel
- Born: 1 November 1834; Stockholm, Sweden
- Died: February 7, 1914 (aged 79)
- Education: Uppsala University
- Occupations: gynecologist obstetrician
- Spouse: Laura Constance Netzel

Nils Wilhelm Netzel (1 November 1834 – 7 February 1914) was a Swedish gynecologist and obstetrician.

== Biography ==
Netzel was born in Stockholm and studied at Uppsala University, completing his dissertation in 1865 on puerperal changes in modern life. In 1863 he took a position as assistant in the obstetric department at the General Maternity Hospital in Stockholm. In 1864 he became a substitute lecturer in obstetrics and gynecology at the Karolinska Institute, and in 1865 became a regular lecturer and in 1879, a professor. In 1887 he succeeded Anders Anderson as professor of obstetrics and gynecology and retained this position until 1889. He performed his first ovariotomy in 1869 and later published numerous studies, providing important research for development of medical procedures. In 1904 he was elected an honorary member of the Swedish Society of Medicine. He died in Stockholm.

In 1866 Netzel married Swedish composer and music conductor Laura Netzel. He maintained a herbarium which was donated on his death to the Stockholm University. A biography of his life was published in 1914 by Frans Johan Eugène Westermark.
