= Springborn =

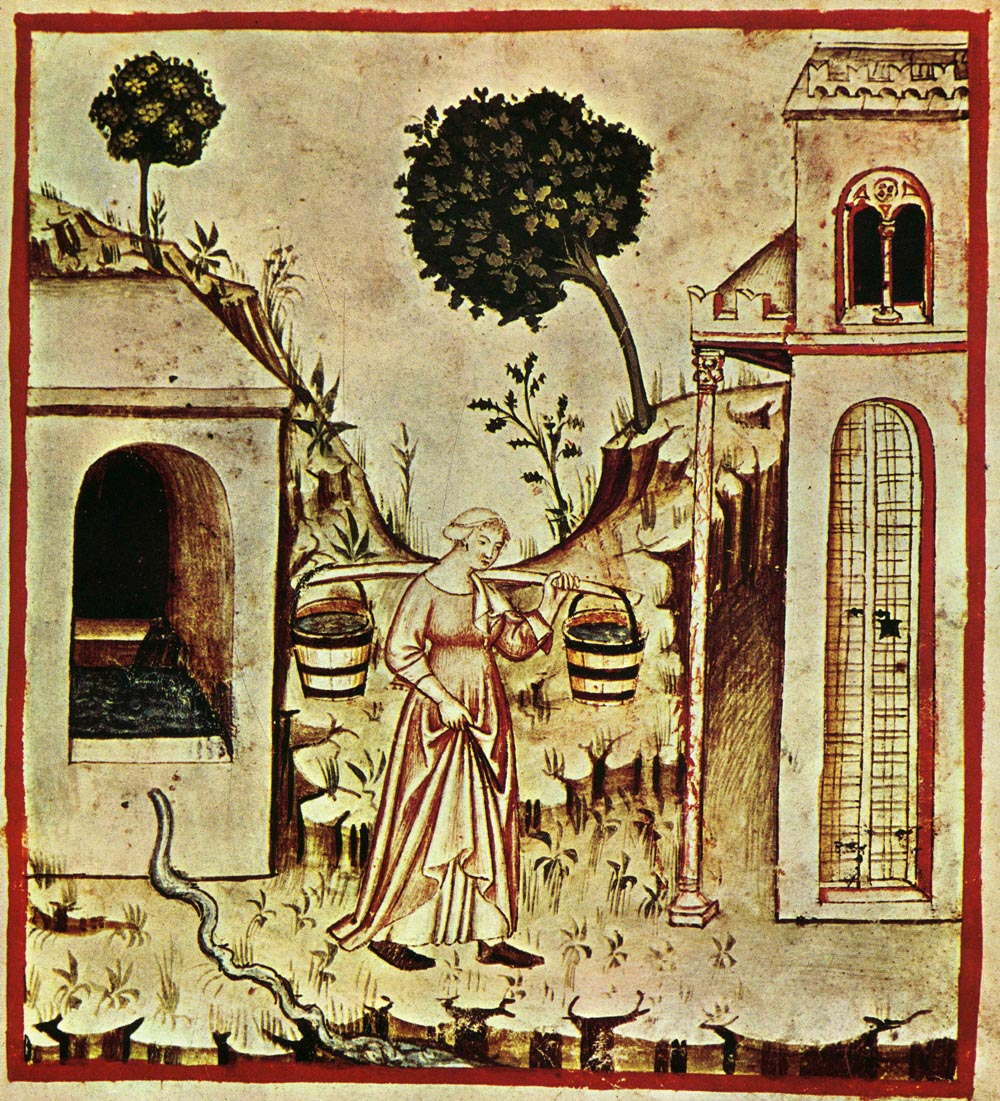
Image of a medieval water well, 14th century

Springborn is a surname of Low German origin.

== Origin and meaning ==
The surname Springborn goes back to the place of living of the first carrier of that surname in medieval times, who lived in the vicinity of a spring or water well. "Springborn" is of German, specifically Middle Low German origin. Its two parts have the meaning sprink = ‚spring‘, and born = ‚well‘. Because the surname came into being in the region of the Low German language it is not surprising that most of the Springborns in Germany are to find in Northern German states.

The same meaning as the surname has the former German village Springborn (East Prussia), which since 1945 belongs to Poland as Stoczek Klasztorny. But the surname does not originate in that region.

== Distribution ==
=== Germany ===
Springborn is, referring to the German telephone directory of 2002, in its frequency a moderate appearing surname in Germany (228 entries). Most of the Springborns of them live in the states of North Rhine-Westphalia, followed by Berlin and Brandenburg. But measured to its low population is the part of surname carriers for Springborn in Mecklenburg-Vorpommern high too.

On the district level there is a special concentration in the district of Uckermark in Brandenburg and its neighbored (former) districts of Mecklenburg-Strelitz and Uecker-Randow in Mecklenburg-Vorpommern and in the districts of Oberhavel, Barnim and Märkisch-Oderland in Brandenburg. This concentration of the surname can be a hint to the region of origin of the surname, but doesn't have to. It is also possible that several families got that surname because of the origin in a place without being related.

=== United States ===
Through emigration, families of German origin brought the surname to America. Today, the surname is primarily found in states near the Great Lakes in the Midwestern United States. Most of the American Springborns live in Wisconsin, followed by Michigan, Illinois, Minnesota and Ohio. The count is low in other states.

== Variations ==
- Springhorn (GER)
- Sprinkborn (GER)
- Sprinckborn (GER)
- Sprengborn (USA)
- Springbohrn (USA)
- Springborne (USA)
- Springbourn (USA)
- Springbourne (USA)
- Springburn (USA)

== Known persons ==
- Arnold Springborn Dr., author of the National Socialist propaganda book Über Lügen und Leichen zum Empire. Englands blutiger Weg zur Weltmacht. (1942) (= Through Lies and Corpses to the Empire. England's Bloody Path to its World Power.
- Beatrice Rose Donath Springborn (born 1975), American television producer
- Boris A. M. Springborn (born 1971), German mathematician with the focus on Differential geometry
- Erich von Springborn (1864–1932), German chemist, who patented in 1919: Verfahren und Vorrichtung zur Verarbeitung von Torf zu einem wasserfreien Erzeugnis von hohem Brennwerte. (= Method and apparatus for the processing of peat to an anhydrous product of high energy value.
- Hermann Springborn (1905–1964), German painter
- Katinka Springborn (born 1971), German actress
- Matthias Springborn, German engineer, Member of the Executive Board of the EOTA, as well as Vice President and Chairman of the Technical Commission of the UEAtc
- Michael Springborn, American economist for resources and environment
- Otto Springborn (1890–1944), German locksmith and resistance fighter against the Nazi regime
- Radina Springborn, German painter from Berlin
- Robert Carl Springborn, American chemist and founder of the "Springborn Fellowship" of the SMFU Boston and the "Springborn Postdoctoral Fellowships" of the University of Illinois
- William J. Springborn (1866–1942), American politician (Republican) in Cleveland
