= Laura Netzel =

Swedish composer, pianist, conductor

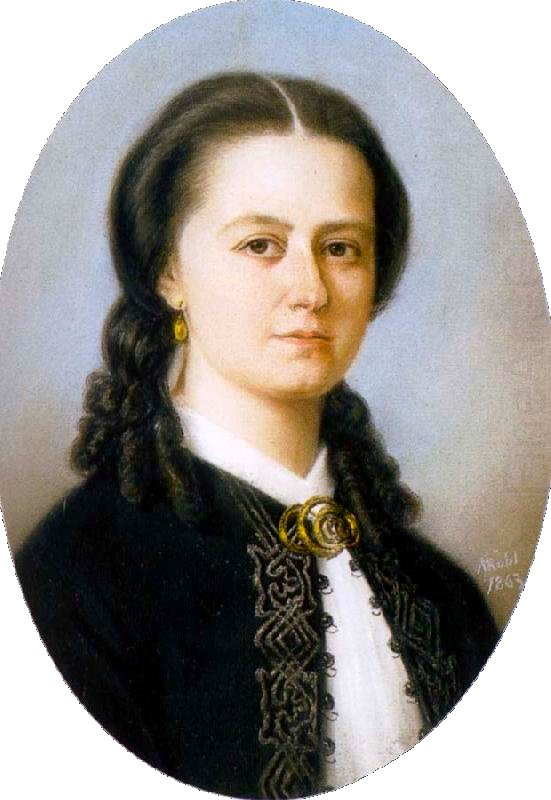
Laura Netzel

Laura Constance Netzel (née Pistolekors; pseudonym, N Lago; 1 March 1839 — 10 February 1927) was a Finnish-born Swedish composer, pianist, conductor and concert organizer who sometimes used the pseudonym N. Lago. She was born in Rantasalmi, Finland, and was proud of her Finnish heritage throughout her life, even though she was just one year old when she moved permanently to Stockholm. Netzel studied piano with Mauritz Gisiko and Anton Door, voice with Julius Günther and composition with Wilhelm Heinze in Stockholm and Charles-Marie Widor in France.

Netzel was active in social causes, including support for poor women, children and workers. In 1866 she married professor Wilhelm Netzel of the Karolinska Institute. She died in Stockholm.

== Life ==
Laura Pistolekors was born in 1839. In her childhood home, as was customary at the time, frequent music salons were organized; at one of these events the organist Elfrida Andrée premiered her first “Tritet for piano” (1860). Laura performed the piano part with two musicians from the court orchestra on violin and cello.

Netzel's opportunities to perform in public diminished after her marriage, and it was then that she turned her creativity to composition. Her debut as a composer is thought to have been when The New Harmony Company of Stockholm performed some of her works for female voices in concert (1874). Her works were first performed under the pseudonym “N Lago”; only ten years later she published her first work under her own name (1884). The proceeds from her concerts were donated to charity, a fact that legitimized her pursuit of a lucrative job that was socially frowned upon for a noblewoman.

For many years, Netzel, motivated by her strong religious faith, organized and conducted popular concerts and social events in Stockholm, which raised large sums of money for charitable works in support of women, children and the poor. For the working class she organized concerts according to the British ideal of educating workers in Art music and providing them with a similar alternative to popular culture, such as variety shows. Her concerts often had to move to larger venues as the audience grew, even refusing entry to wealthy people in order to give more seats to the poor. These concerts often featured great Swedish and foreign artists, along with young, unestablished musicians. They often performed Netzel's music in their own concerts on the big stages in Sweden and Europe.

Most of her compositions are in the late romantic chromatic style, with hints of contemporary French music. Her work received good reviews in French music magazines; she was praised for her “melodic wit, daring harmonies, and at the same time constant ease”. She was very proud of these characteristics; fearing to lose her intuitive musicality, she long postponed her study of composition, which she did only in the 1880s.

Netzel's French influences can be perceived in “her use of chromatic and other harmonies, in the many French titles she gave to her works, and also in the fact that she composed for flute”. In France, woodwinds had a status that in the rest of Europe was largely reserved for piano, voice, and strings.

Her most ambitious work, with the greatest musical resources and the longest duration, was Stabat Mater for soloists, mixed choir and organ, later with orchestra in her own adaptation. The Court attended the premiere (1890), and later King Óscar II wrote her a personal letter of thanks.

"The recognition of women as composers was my driving force," said Netzel, who was given the task of presiding over the women's musical arts at the Chicago World's Fair (1893). Four composers were chosen to represent Sweden: Elfrida Andrée, Valborg Aulin, Helena Munktell and Laura Netzel. They are still considered the most prominent of the Swedish women composers and to belong to the first rank of 19th-century Swedish composers in general.

== Works ==
=== Orchestra ===
- Fantasia for orchestra, op. 77, words by King Oskar II (1903)
- Violin Concerto op. 83
- Piano Concerto op. 84

=== Chamber music ===
- Berceuse et Tarentelle for violin and piano, op. 28 (no later than 1892)
- Suite in A minor for flute and piano, op. 33
- Tarantelle in A minor for violin and piano, op. 33 (1896)
- Humoresque in F major for violin and piano, op. 37 (1896 at the latest)
- Romance in E major for violin and piano or organ, op. 38
- Romance in A major for violin and piano, op. 40 (no later than 1896)
- Andante religioso in D major for violin and piano, op. 48 (1896)
- Serenade for piano, violin and cello op. 50 (1895)
- Hungarian Dance for cello and piano, op. 51
- Slavonic Song in G major for violin and piano, op. 53 (no later than 1894)
- Cradle Song in E major for violin and piano, op. 59 (no later than 1906)
- La gondoliera in A major for violin and piano, op. 60 (1896)
- Suite in A minor for violin and piano, op. 62 (1897)
- Sonata in E minor for cello and piano, op. 66 (1899)
- Preludio e Fughetta in G minor for piano, violin and cello op. 68 (1900)
- Cradle Song in F sharp major for violin (or flute) and piano, op. 69 (1900 at the latest)
- Colibri in F major for flute and violin op. 72
- Piano trio in D minor, op. 78 (no later than 1895)
- Poème romantique in A flat major 3 for violin and piano, op. 86

=== Piano music ===
- 3 salon pieces for piano, op. 24
- Humoresques 1-3 for piano, op. 26 (1889)
- Piano sonata in E-flat major, op. 27 (1893)
- Minuet in G major for piano, op. 48
- Feu Follet, Concert Quintet in A-flat major for piano, op. 49 (no later than 1877)
- Deux Études de Concert for piano, op. 52 (1885)
- Six Morceaux for piano, op. 57 (1896)
- Piano Concerto in E minor for 2 pianos
- Cello Sonata in E minor, Op. 66 (1899)

=== Choral works ===
- Ballad for soloist, mixed choir and orchestra, op. 19 (1887)
- Psalm of David 146 for mixed choir and organ, op. 29, text from Book of Psalms
- Deux Choeurs for female voices and piano, op. 30
  1. "Edelweiss", Text by Carl Snoilsky
  2. "Le papillion et la rose", Text by Victor Hugo
- Tre Chörer, op. 31 (1890)
  1. "Fjäriln och rosen" for female choir a cappella, Text by the composer
  2. "Vind, som mig smeker" for female choir a cappella, Text by Johan Ludvig Runeberg
  3. "Zuleimas sång" for solo soprano and male choir a cappella, Text by Johan Nybom
- Stabat Mater for solo voice, mixed choir and organ, op. 45 (1890)
- Choir for female voices for female choir and piano
  1. "Edelweiss", words by Carl Snoilsky
  2. "Nobody knows," Text by Zachris Topelius

=== Vocal music ===
- Songs for piano and violin obligato, op. 20
  1. "Hvem styrde hit din väg?", Text by Johan Ludvig Runeberg
  2. "Om min tanke lågt från gruset", Text by Carl David af Wirsén
- Trastens klagan for voice and piano, words by King Oscar II, op. 34 (1889)
- Les cloches du Monastère, ballad for soprano and piano or orchestra, lyrics: Eric Bögh, op. 35
- Four pieces for piano, op. 36 (1888)
  1. "Slumra, slumra bölja blå", lyrics by Eric Bögl, lyrics by Eric BögText by Fjalar
  2. "En dröm", Text by Fjalar
  3. Morgonstråle, Text by Zachris Topelius
  4. "Em gang, og aldrig mer"
- Three duets for female voices and piano, op. 39 (1889)
  1. "Hur skönt bland österns skyar", Text by Johan Ludvig Runeberg
  2. "Aftonsång", Text by Johan Nyblom
  3. "Visa från Mora", words by King Oskar II
- Ave Maria for voice and organ or piano, op. 41 (1894)
- Blå grottan, duo for soprano and tenor and piano, dir. Carl Snoilsky, op. 43
- Three songs for voice and piano, op. 44 (1890s)
  1. "Lied", Text by Emanuel Geibel
  2. "Wunsch", Text by Robert Reinick
  3. "Grüss", san. Heinrich Heine
- Four songs for mezzo-soprano or baritone and piano, op. 46 (1878)
  1. "Rappelle-toi", Text by Alfred de Musset
  2. "Malgré moi!", Text by Jules Barbier
  3. "Rêve encore!", san. Victor Hugo
  4. "Je pense à toi!" san. Jules Barbier
- Three pieces for piano, op. 47
  1. "I natten", Text by Viktor Rydberg
  2. "Det är brännande yrsel i rosornas doft" (lyrics unknown)
  3. "Madrigal", Text by Armand Sylvestre
- Voici la brise for voice and piano, Text by Zari, op. 55 (1895?)
- Riddaren drager till Hove for voice and piano or orchestra, op. 56
- Sehnsucht, song for alto or baritone and piano, op. 63
- Kennst du am Rhein, die Glocken, a song for alto or baritone, Text by Carmen Sylva, op. 75
- Flaggan opp! in memory of King Oscar II, for voice and piano, op. 85 (1907?)
- Fjäriln for voice and piano, Text by Elias Sehlstedt (1884)
- Church Oara with organ or piano accompaniment, source Stabat mater (1884)
- Three songs with piano accompaniment(1884)
  1. "Lofsång", Text by Esaias Tegnér
  2. "Chant du rossignol" (lyrics unknown)
  3. "Stilla, mitt hjerta", dir. Bernhard Elis Malmström
- Two trios for female voices with piano accompaniment (1884)
  1. "Trio", Text by Johan Ludvig Runeberg
  2. "Barcarolle" (Text by unknown)
- Blomman for voice and piano, Text by Bernhard Elis Malmström (1887)
- Morgonen for voice and piano, Text by Johan Ludvig Runeberg (1891)
- Ett barns aftonbön for voice and piano, Text by Carl Wilhelm Böttiger (1898)
- Blomman for voice and piano, Text by Johan Ludvig Runeberg
- Colibri for voice and piano
- Der einst Gedanke for voice and piano
- Säg mig du lilla fogel for voice and piano, Text by Johan Ludvig Runeberg
- Vårsång for voice and piano, Text by Bernhard Elis Malmström
- Välsigna käre Herre det hem som öppnas här for voice and piano

== Reception ==
Savo Music Society has undertaken a project to publish works by Netzel and other unknown female composers. In August 2021, they organized a Laura Netzel Music Festival in Rantasalmi where her songs, instrumental pieces and orchestral works were performed in a series of concerts. Performances included Piano Sonata E flat major, Ballad for Soprano and Orchestra (Op. 35, world premiere), and Piano Concerto E minor, Op. 84. The piano concerto was premiered at Mikkeli Music Festival in 2020. An intense, high-Romantic, Lisztian work with a currency of grand rhetorical gestures and occasional moments of searching lyricism, it was reconstructed by the pianist Peter Friis Johansson who has since recorded it on the BIS label.
