= Wilhelm Heintze =

Swedish organist, music educator and music conductor

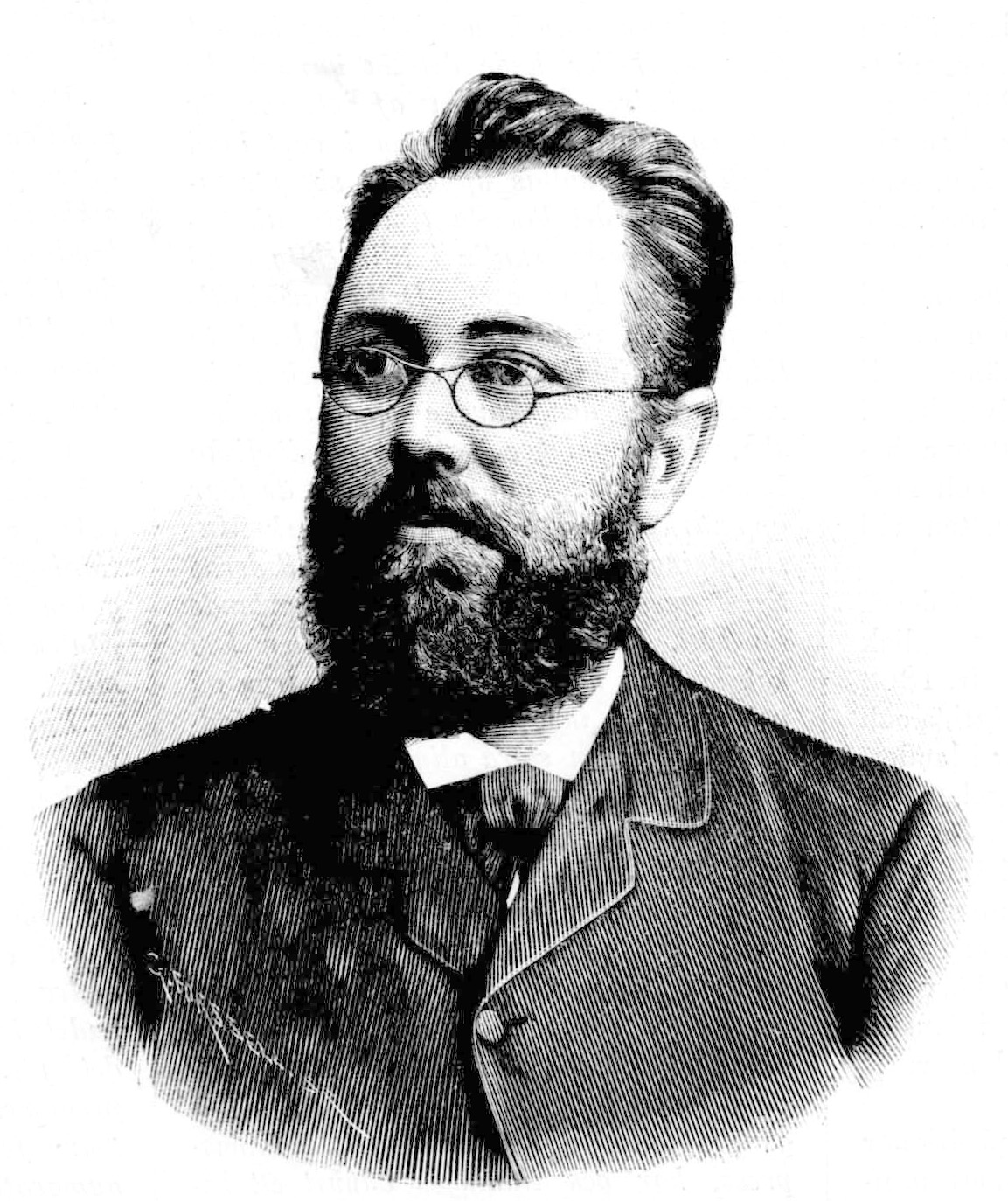
Wihelm Heintze Portrait

Georg Wilhelm Heintze (4 July 1849 – 10 January 1895) was a Swedish organist, music educator and music conductor.

== Biography ==
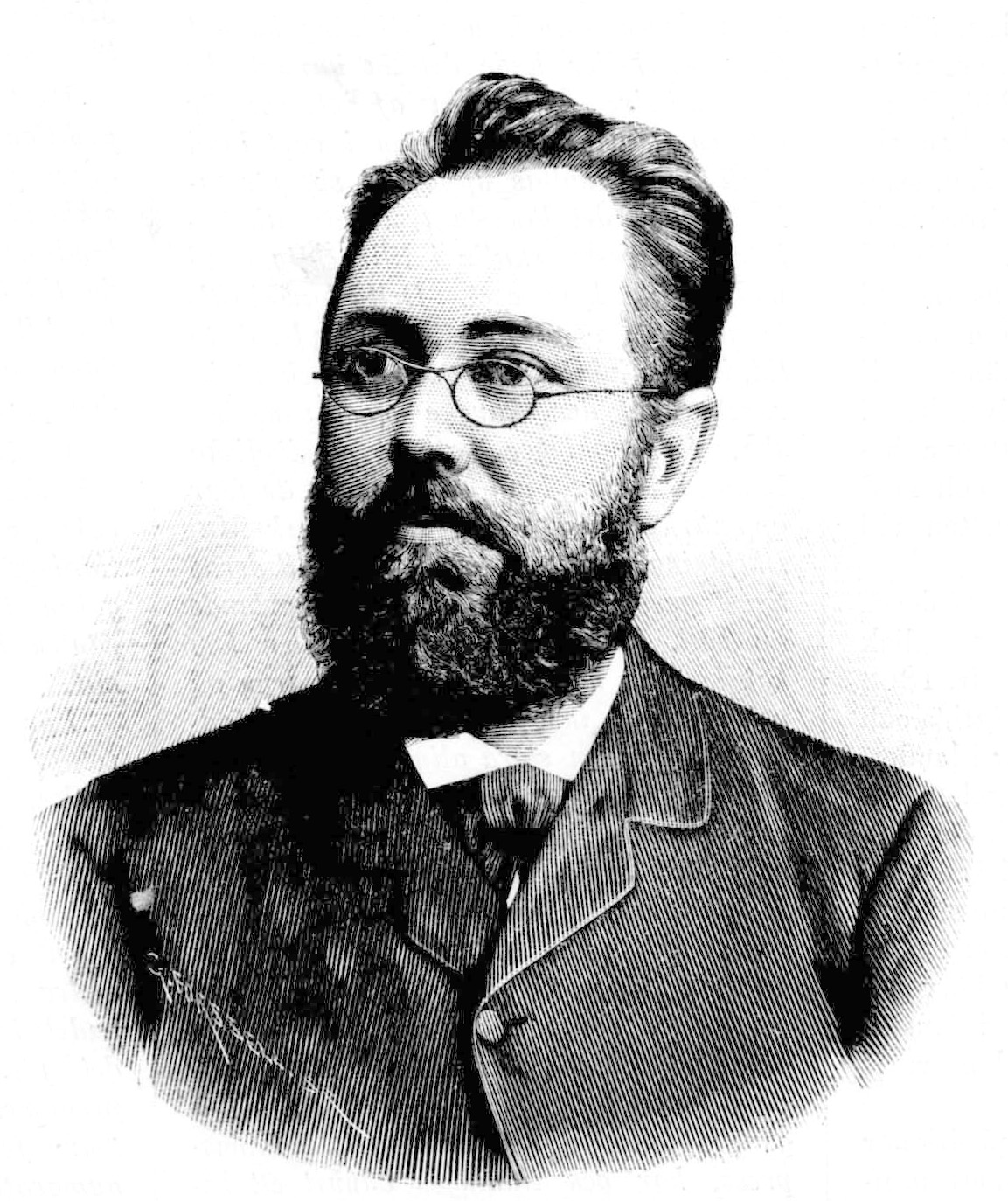
Wilhelm Heintze

Wilhelm Heintze was the son of organist Gustaf Wilhelm Heintze, and studied music at the Stockholm Conservatory from 1865–70. In 1871 he became conductor and in 1872 music director of the Jönköping Regiment Band. He served as organist of the St. Jacob Parish in Stockholm from 1881–89, and as the Lund University Music Director and cathedral organist in Lund from 1889–95. He was elected to the Royal Academy of Music in 1882. Organist Gustaf Hjalmar Heintze was his son. Notable students include composer Laura Netzel.
