= Thomas Schäuble =

German politician

Thomas Schäuble (23 July 1948 – 3 January 2013) was a longtime German politician and younger brother of Wolfgang Schäuble and personal friend of Winfried Kretschmann. He was member of CDU. In 2004 he became the manager of brewery "Badische Staatsbrauerei Rothaus." In July 2012 on a walk in the Black Forest he suffered from a myocardial infarction and remained in Persistent vegetative state. Schäuble died January 2013.
