= Brau Holding International =

Company group based in Munich

Paulaner Brauerei Gruppe GmbH & Co. KGaA is a holding company for several breweries in Germany. It is the sixth largest holding company of breweries in Germany, with a total production volume of 4.5 million hectolitres (3,800,000 US bbl) in 2014.

It was founded in 2002 and is owned by Schörghuber Unternehmensgruppe.

== Subsidiaries ==
- Kulmbacher Group
  - Kulmbacher Brewery, Kulmbach
  - Sternquell Brewery, Plauen
  - Würzburger Hofbräu, Würzburg
  - Scherdel Brewery, Hof
  - Braustolz, Chemnitz
- Südwest Brewery Group
  - Fürstenberg Brewery, Donaueschingen
  - Hoepfner Brewery, Karlsruhe
  - Schmucker Brewery, Ober-Mossau
