= Gruber, Manitoba =

Coordinates: 51.721°N 99.961°W

Gruber was an unincorporated place in what is now the Rural Municipality of Mossey River, Manitoba. Hersh Girtle was the postmaster at one time. The location was described as 37 miles (60 km) north of Dauphin and 2 miles (3 km) north of Winnipegosis, but another source gives the location as 1.5 miles (2.5 km) south of Winnipegosis.

Gruber was established by and named after its founder, Rabbi Eliezer Lazar Gruber. It was formally recognised by the Department of the Interior, Government of Canada, on October 19, 1904, in accordance with the hamlet provisions of the Dominion Lands Act. The Department of Interior extended settlement solely to the 19 persons that had made homestead and declared that settlement would not be extended beyond that.

Gruber is listed as a station served by Canadian Northern Railway in a 1907 edition of The Official Railway Guide: North American Freight Service Edition.
