= Fürstenberg Brewery =

German brewery

Fürstlich Fürstenbergische Brauerei GmbH & Co. KG

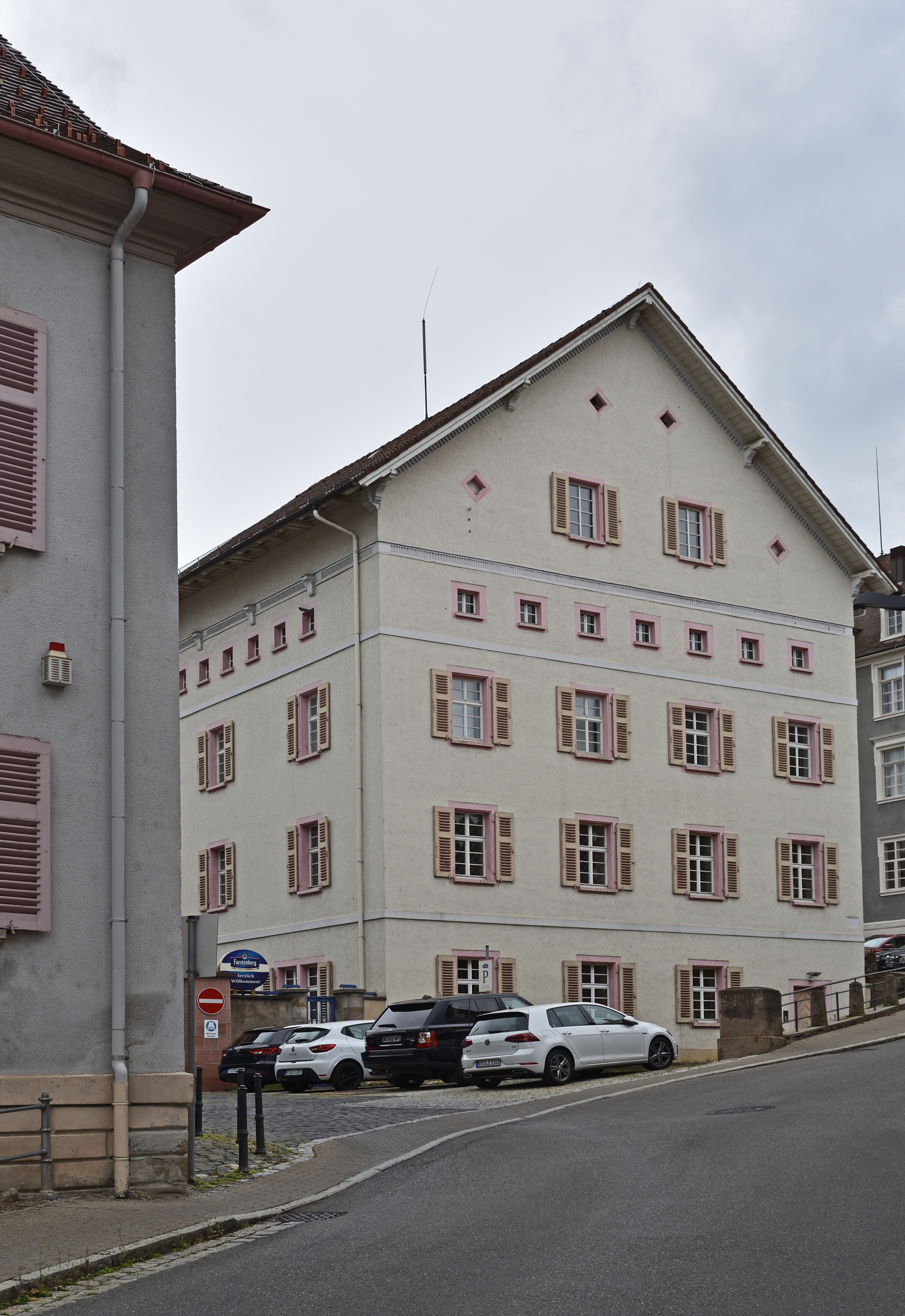
- Type: GmbH & Co. KG
- Location: Donaueschingen, Germany
- Coordinates: 47°57′5″N 8°30′1″E
- Opened: 1283
- Key people: Georg Schwende
- Annual production volume: Approx. 800,000 hectolitres (680,000 US bbl) in 2011
- Owned by: Brau Holding International
- Employees: Approx. 200
- Website: fuerstenberg.de

The Fürstenberg Brewery (German: Fürstlich Fürstenbergische Brauerei) is a brewery in Donaueschingen, Germany. It has been a subsidiary of Brau Holding International since 2005, before which it was owned by the House of Fürstenberg, a German noble family. Among other offerings, the brewery produces pilsner, export, and wheat beer, primarily serving southern Germany.

== History ==
The counts (later princes) of the House of Fürstenberg first received a brewing right in 1283. The brewery began its transition into a large brewery in the 18th century, when Anton Egon, Prince of Fürstenberg-Heiligenberg began construction of a large brewery at the present-day site in Donaueschingen.

As the brewery grew, it began to export over the newly created railroads in Germany throughout the 19th century, making it an early adopter of long distance distribution. The brewery began to make pilsner-style beers in 1895. The brewery received a royal warrant of appointment from Wilhelm II, who designated Fürstenberg Pilsner as his table beverage.

Since 2005, the brand has been owned by Brau Holding International, a joint venture between Heineken and Schörghuber, with the intention of operating as an independent, wholly owned subsidiary.

Every year in late winter, the brewery produces a seasonal Fasnet beer for Swabian-Alemannic Fastnacht.

== See also ==
- List of oldest companies
