= Kulmbacher Brewery =

German brewery

Kulmbacher Brauerei AG
- Location: Kulmbach, Bavaria, Germany
- Coordinates: 50°06′22″N 11°26′39″E
- Opened: 1846
- Annual production volume: 1.73 million hectolitres (1,470,000 US bbl)
- Owned by: Brau Holding International GmbH (62,66 % of the shares

Active beers
Name	Type
Kulmbacher Edelherb
Kulmbacher Gold
Kulmbacher Eisbock
Kulmbacher Lager
Kulmbacher Festbier
Kulmbacher Feinmild
Mönchshof Kellerbier
Mönchshof Lager
Mönchshof Landbier
Mönchshof Original
Mönchshof Schwarzbier
Mönchshof Bockbier
Mönchshof Weihnachtsbier
Mönchshof Museumsbier
Mönchshof Festbier
EKU Pils
EKU Hell
EKU Export
EKU Festbier
EKU 28
Kapuziner Weißbier
Kapuziner Winterweizen

The Kulmbach Brewery Corporation (German: Kulmbacher Brauerei AG) was founded in 1895 under the name Reichelbräu in Kulmbach, a city in Upper Franconia, Bavaria, Germany.

== History ==
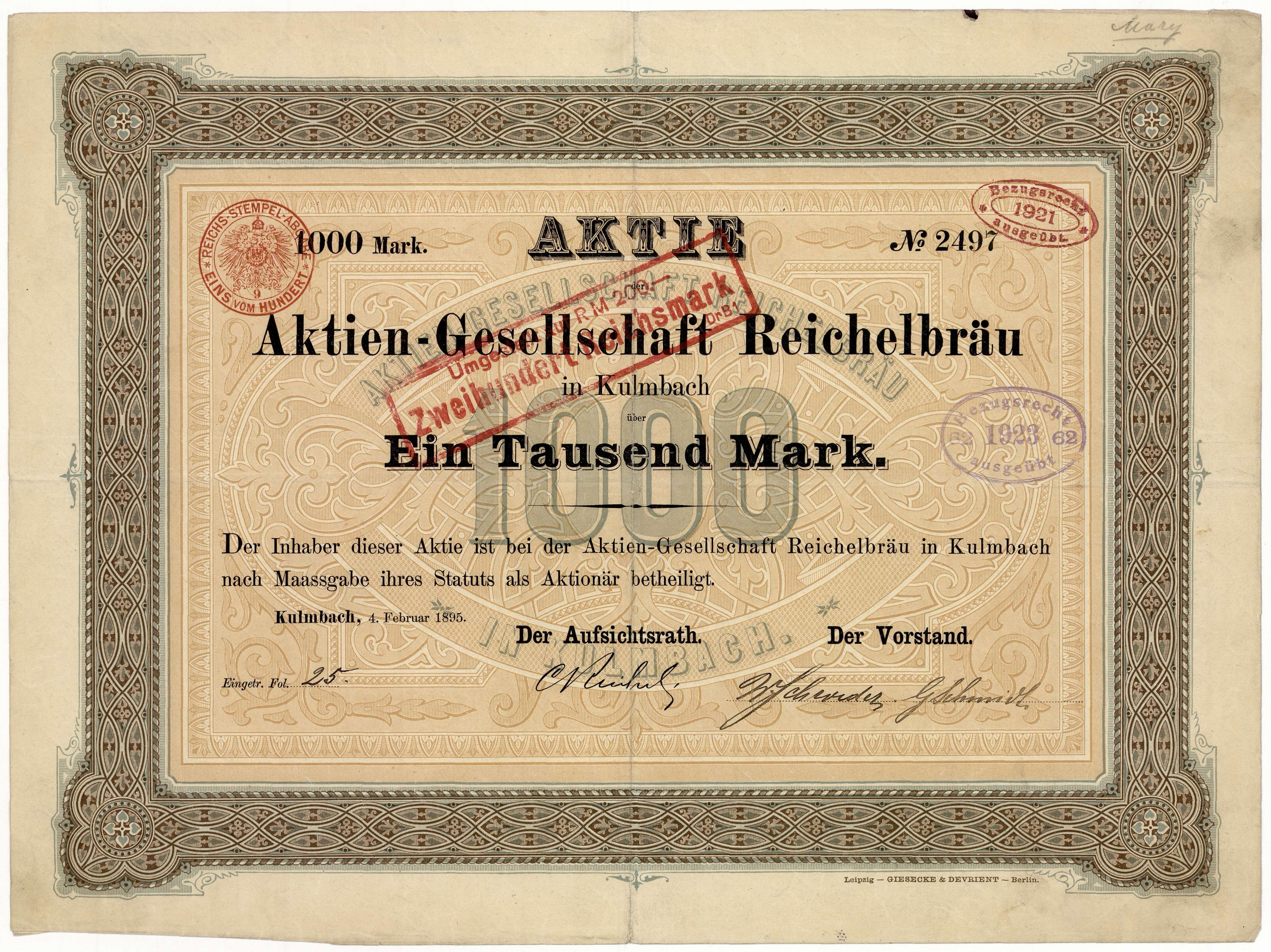
Share of the Reichelbräu, issued 4. February 1895

The success of the brewery started with the export of Kulmbach beer to Central, East and North Germany.

Since 1980 the Kulmbach Brewery Corporation has been noticed for its steady expansions. In 1980 and 1984 the company merged with the companies Sandlerbräu and Mönchshof-Bräu GmbH and two more brands of beer were added to the product line.

In 1986, the Schörghuber Unternehmungsgruppe took over 49,9% of the share capital. The expansions continued in the 1990s with the take-overs of the companies Sternquell Brauerei, Plauen, the Braustolz Brauerei in Chemnitz, Eku as well as a majority of the stock in the Bad Brambacher mineral spring. Since 1996 the brands EKU, Reichel, Sandler and Mönchshof are under the roof of the Kulmbach Brewery Corporation. In 2002, the beverage production exceeded three million hektolitres.

In 2024, Jörg Lehmann was appointed interim CEO of the brewery.

In 2025 the company closed its Scherdel brewery in Hof due to reduced beer consumption.

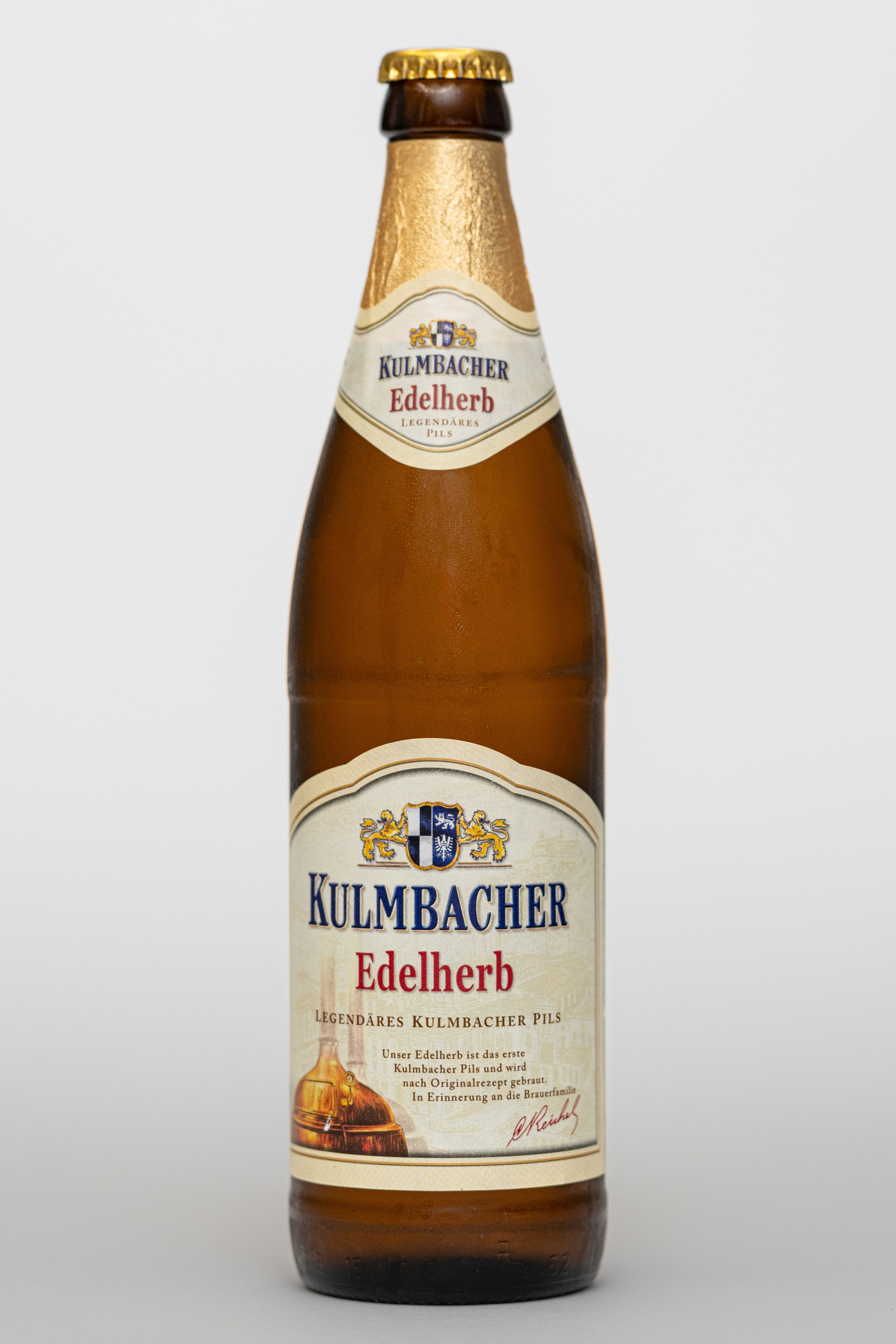
Kulmbacher Edelherb Pils

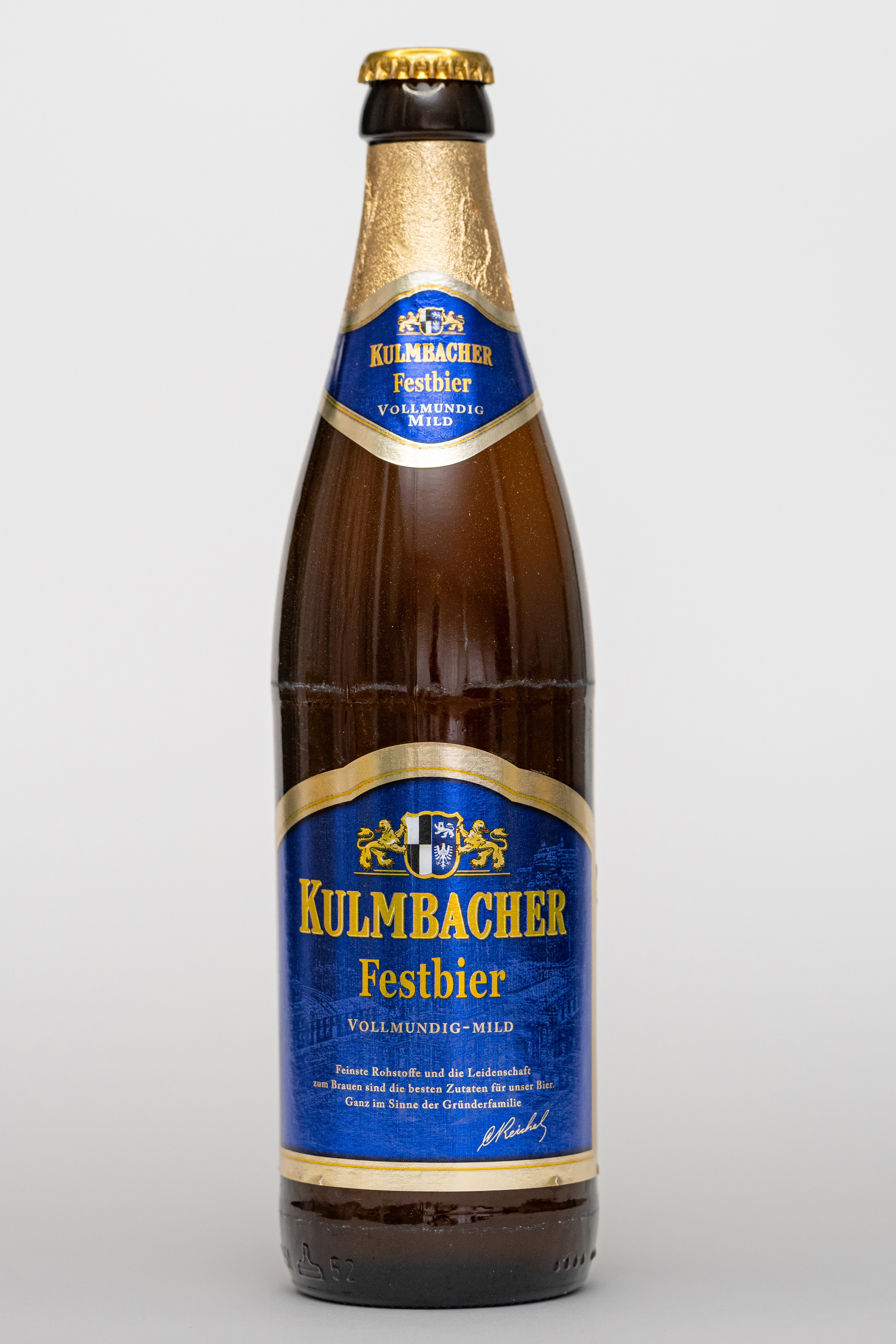
Kulmbacher Festbier

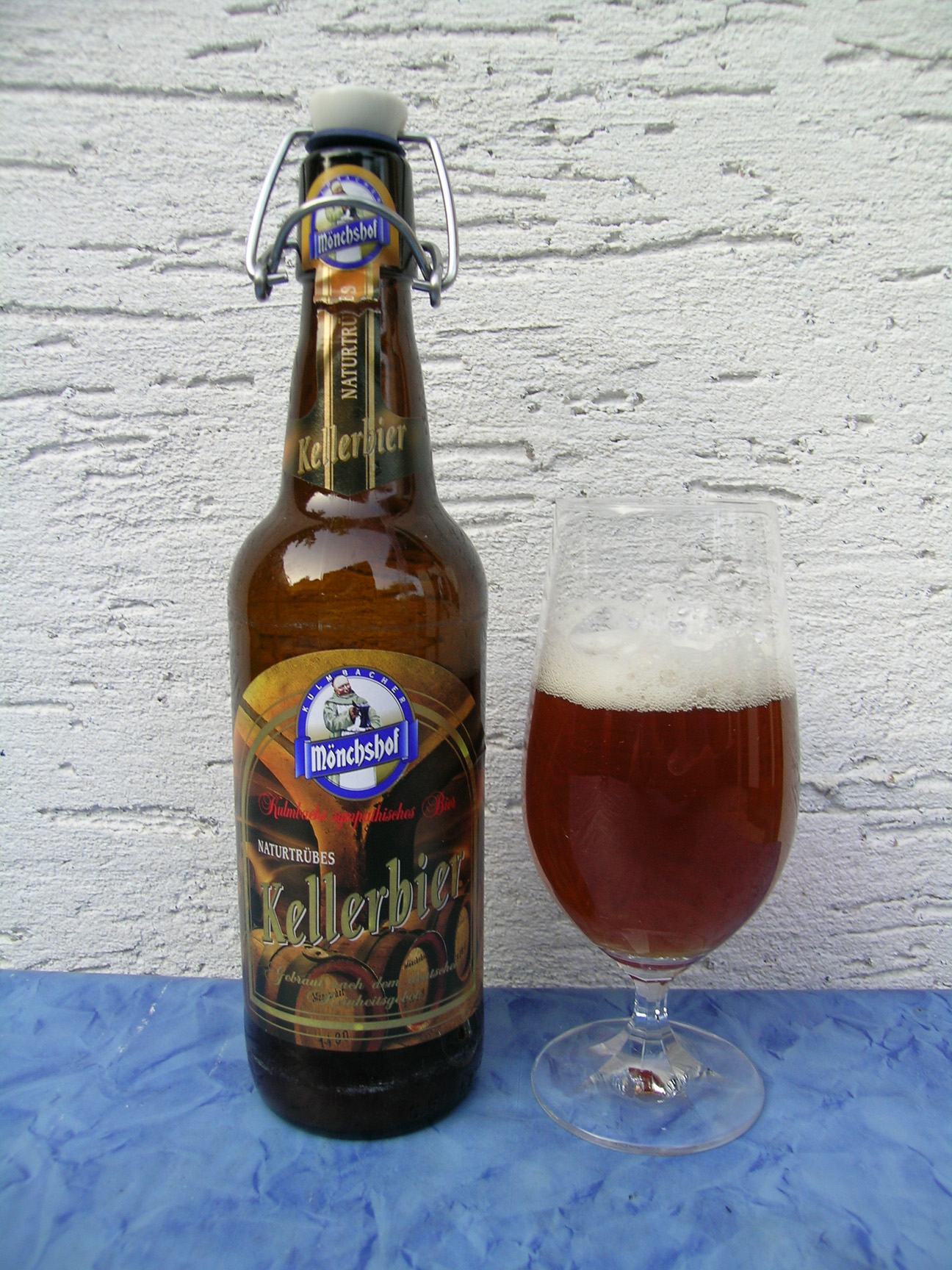
Kulmbacher Kellerbier

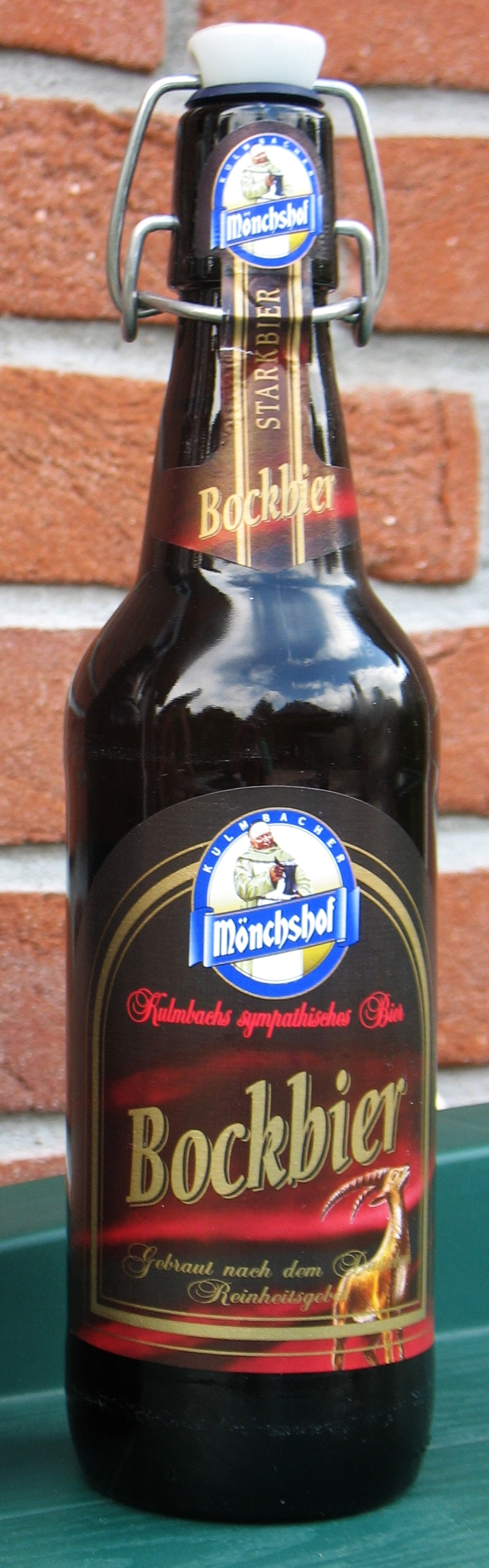
Mönchshof Bockbier

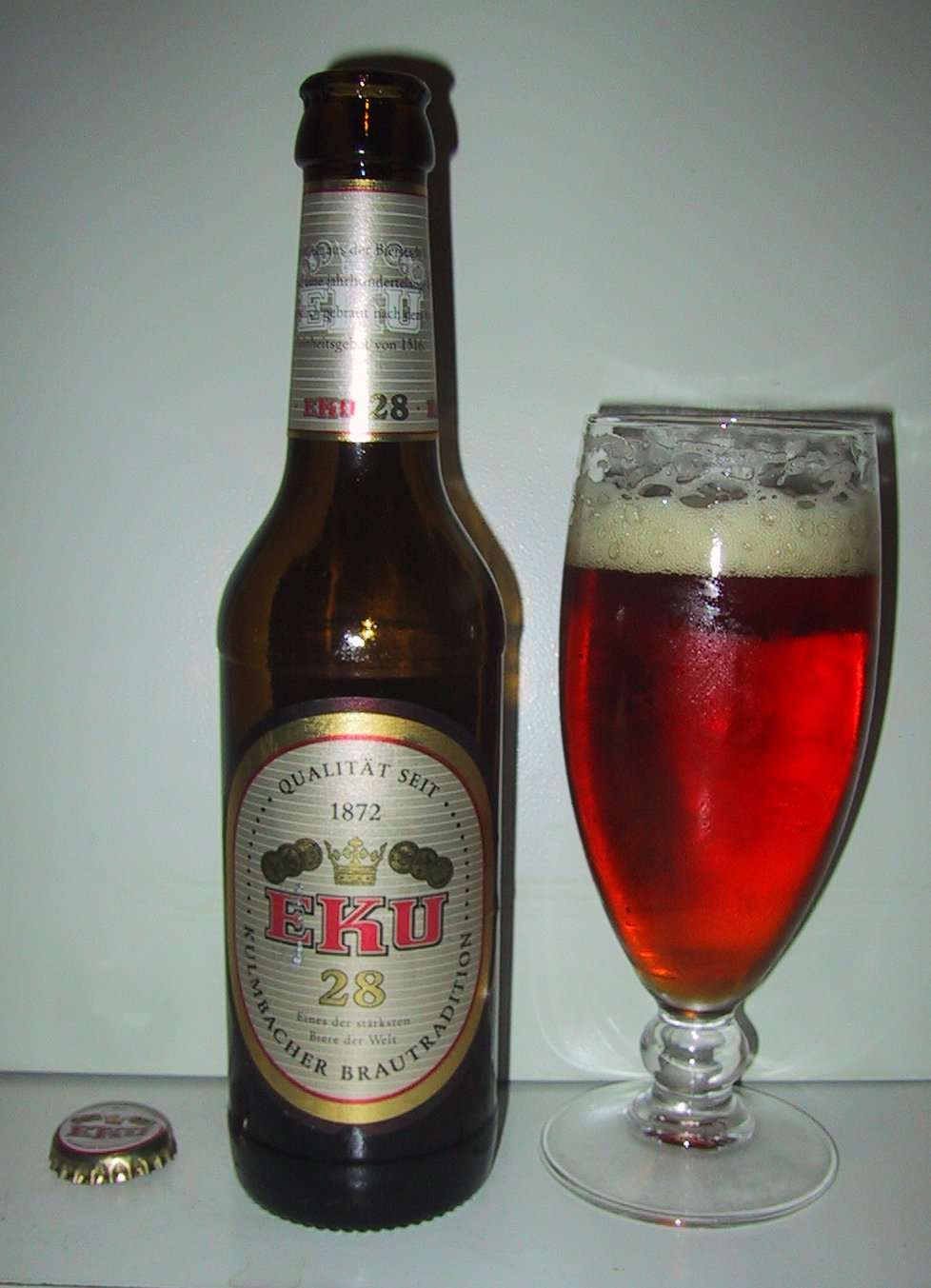
EKU 28

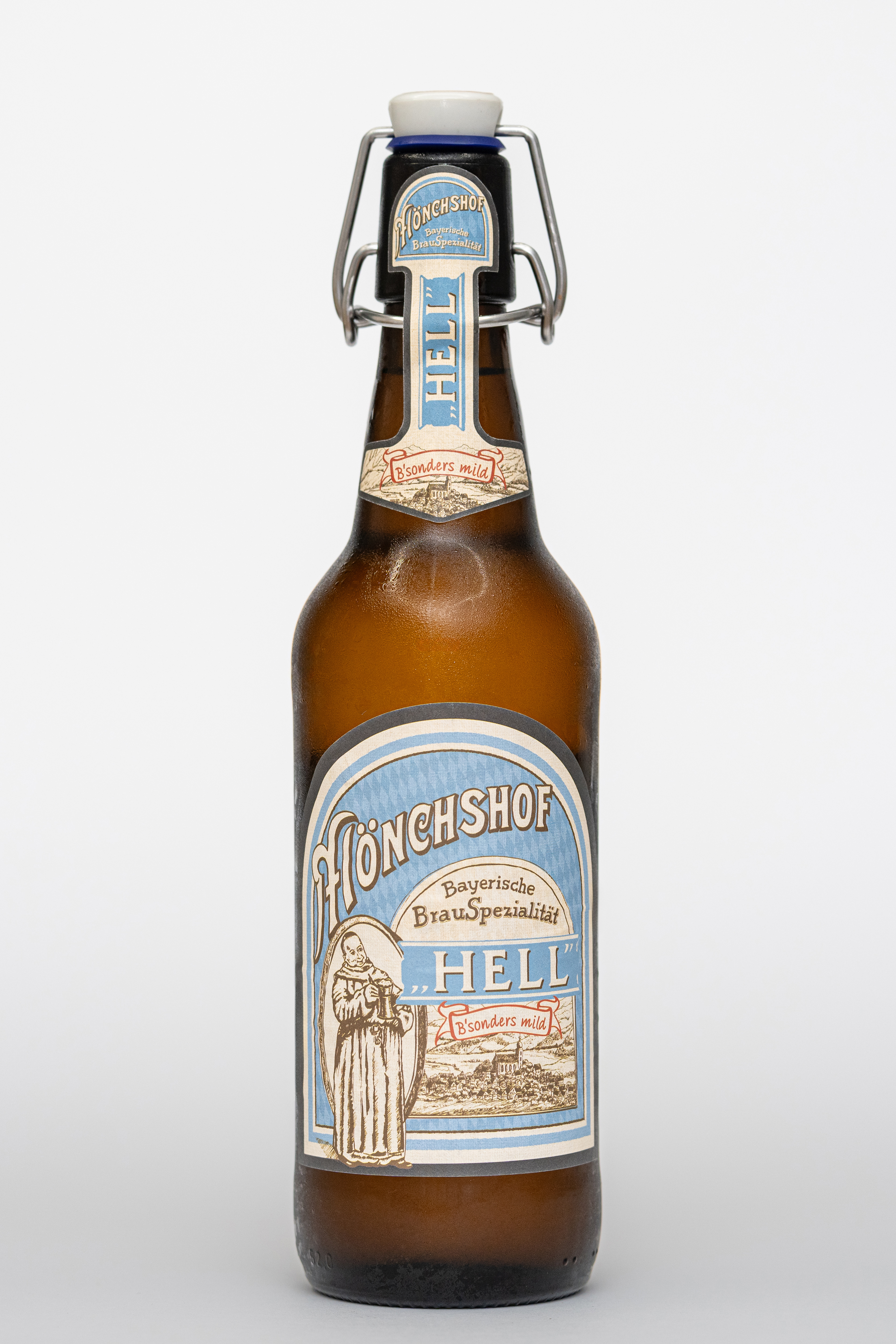
Mönchshof Hell

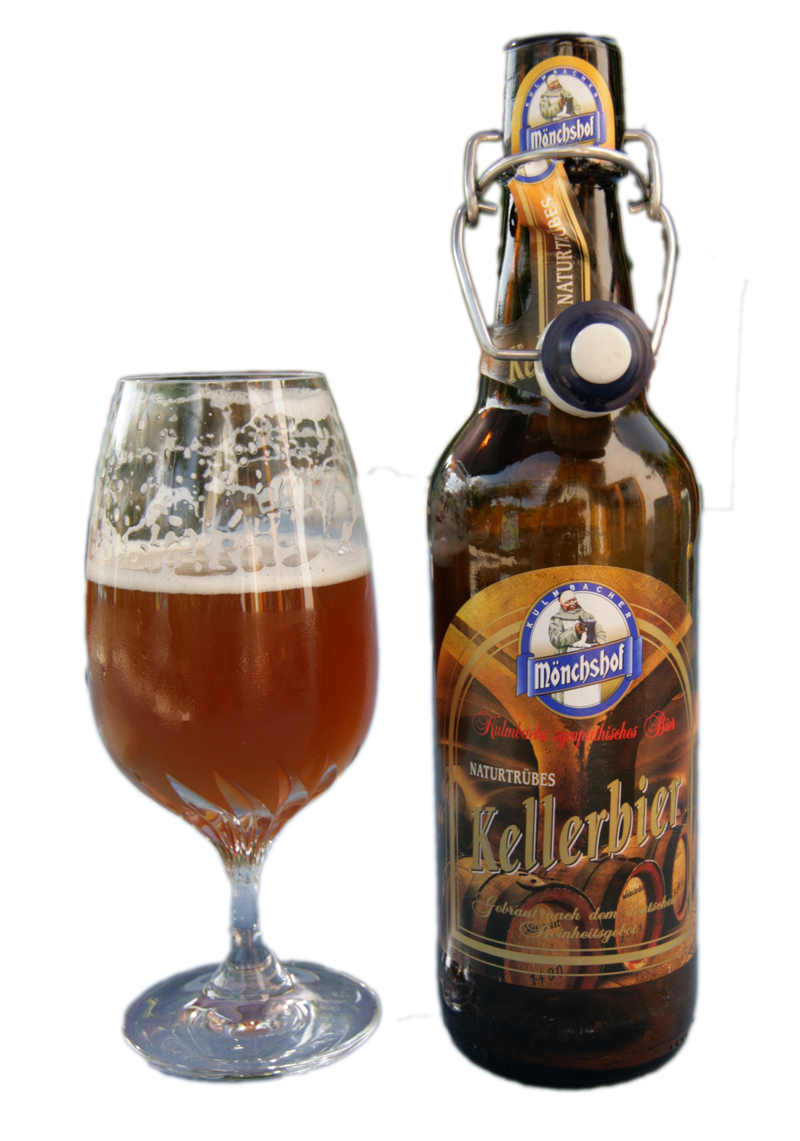
Mönchshof Kellerbier

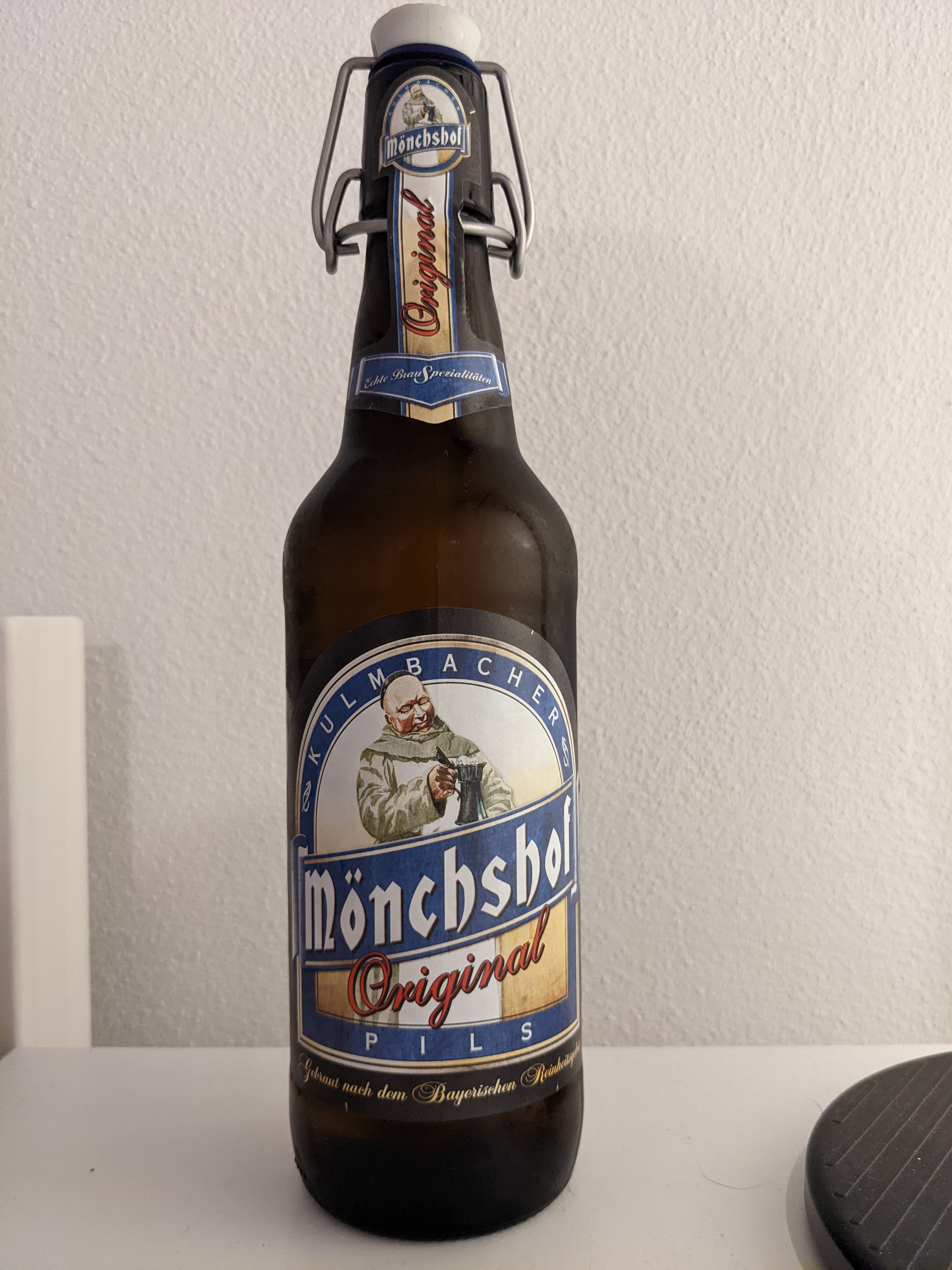
Mönchshof Original

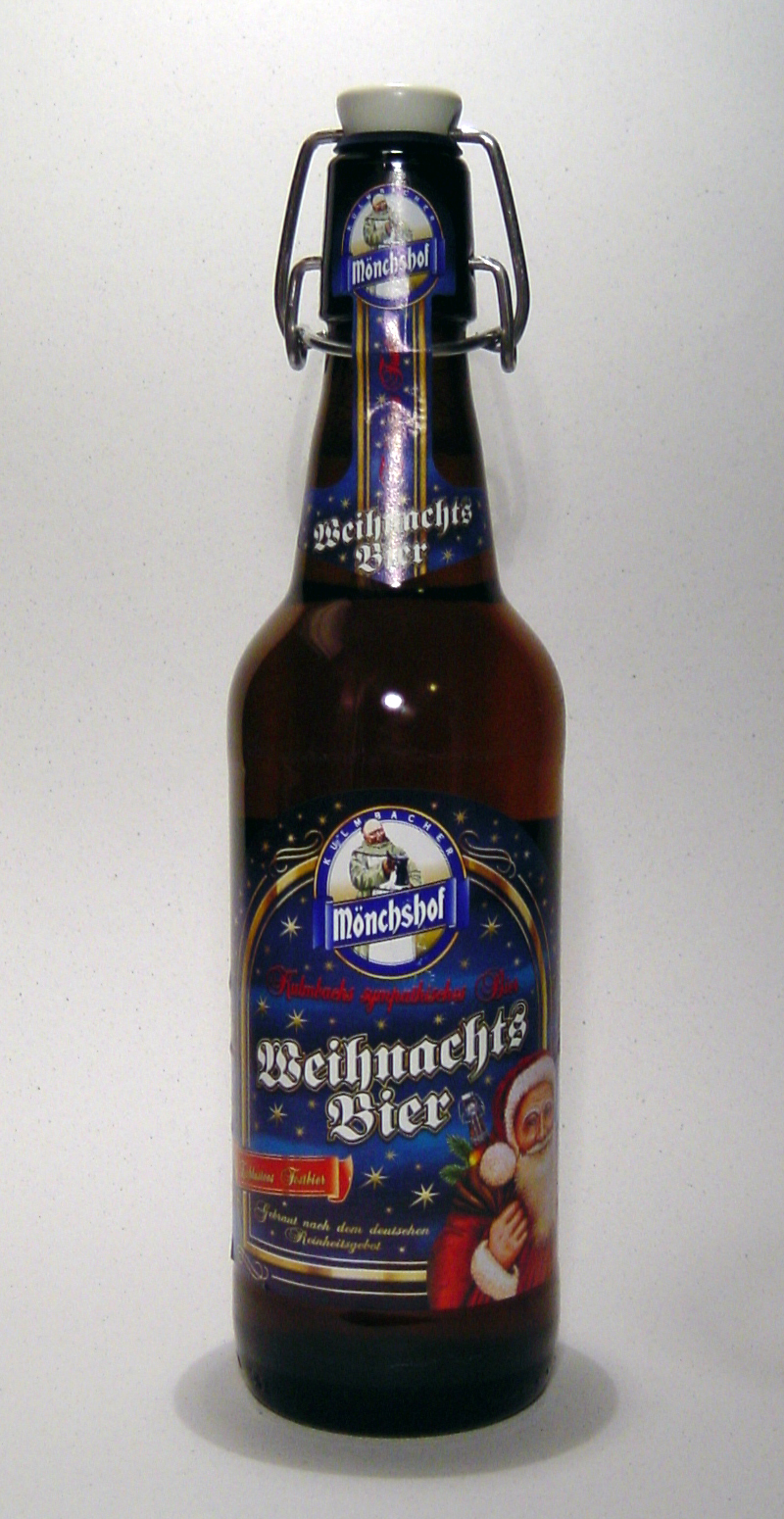
Mönchshof Weihnachtsbier
