= Schwarzenegger (surname) =

Schwarzenegger (German pronunciation: [ˈʃvaʁtsn̩ˌʔɛɡɐ]) is a German surname meaning "person from Schwarzenegg", which is the name of several minor places in Austria and Switzerland. The place-name derives from schwarz(en), meaning "black", and Egg, meaning "corner", "angle", or "edge" (cf. standard German Ecke). It can also come from the Germanic word "egg" as in danish, meaning "oak tree".

Notable people with the surname include:

- Afia Schwarzenegger (born 1982), Ghanaian media personality
- Arnold Schwarzenegger (born 1947), Austrian-American former bodybuilder, film actor, and Governor of California
- Christian Schwarzenegger (born 1959), Swiss academic and professor of criminal law, cousin once removed of Arnold Schwarzenegger
- Gustav Schwarzenegger (1907–1972), Austrian police chief, father of Arnold Schwarzenegger
- Katherine Schwarzenegger (born 1989), American author, daughter of Arnold Schwarzenegger
- Patrick Schwarzenegger (born 1993), American entrepreneur, actor and model, son of Arnold Schwarzenegger
