= Ahrens =

Ahrens or Ahrends is a German surname, derived from a patronymic of Ahrend or Arent, which is a variant form of the given name Arnold.

Ahrens may refer to:

- Adolf Ahrens (1897–1957), German politician
- Alfred Emanuel Ahrens, Canadian politician
- Brigitte Ahrens (born 1945), German singer
- Chris Ahrens (disambiguation), several people by this name
- Dave Ahrens (born 1958), American football player
- Eduard Ahrens (1803–1863), Estonian linguist and clergyman
- Edward H. Ahrens (1919–1942), US Navy Cross recipient
- Franz Heinrich Ludolf Ahrens (1809–1881), German philologist
- Gaby Ahrens (born 1981), Namibian sport shooter
- Heinrich Ahrens (1808–1874), German philosopher and jurist
- Janette Ahrens (1925–2016), American figure skater
- Joseph Ahrens (1904–1997), German composer and organist
- Karl Ahrens (1924–2015), German politician
- Kevin Ahrens (born 1989), American baseball player
- Kurt Ahrens Jr. (born 1940), racing car driver
- Lou Ahrens, American soccer player
- Louis H. Ahrens, (1918–1990) South African geochemist
- Lynn Ahrens (born 1948), American musical theatre lyricist
- Mariella Ahrens (born 1969), German actress
- Marlene Ahrens (1933–2020), Chilean athlete
- Mary A. Ahrens, American social reformer
- Matthias Ahrens (born 1961), German biathlete, cross-country skier and coach
- Nick Ahrens (born 1983), American designer and art director
- Rene Ahrens, Australian Paralympic athlete and wheelchair basketballer
- Robert Ahrens (born 1970), American film and theatrical producer
- Sieglinde Ahrens (born 1936), German organist
- Silvia Poll Ahrens (born 1970), Nicaraguan-born swimmer
- Thomas Ahrens (rowing) (born 1948), German coxswain
- Thomas J. Ahrens (1936–2010), American geophysicist
- Tom Ahrens, American nurse
- Wilhelm Ahrens (1872–1927), German mathematician and writer

== See also ==
- Ahrens v. Clark, a United States Supreme Court case
- Angela Ahrendts (born 1960), US businesswoman
- Arent Arentsz (1585–1631), Dutch painter
- Ahrén
- Ahrend
- Ahrendt
- Arend
- Arends
- Arent
- Arents
