= Arndt =

Arndt or Arnd is a German masculine given name, a short form of Arnold, as well as a German patronymic surname. Notable people with the name include:

== Given name ==
- Arndt Bause (1936–2003), German composer of popular songs
- Arndt von Bohlen und Halbach (1938–1986), German heir
- Arnd Goldschmidt (born 1981), German flatwater canoer
- Arndt Jorgens (1905–1980), American baseball catcher
- Arndt Kaspar (born 1962), German sport shooter
- Arnd Klawitter (born 1968), German actor
- Arndt Kohn (born 1980), German politician
- Arnd Krüger (born 1944), German sports historian
- Arnd Meier (born 1973), German racecar driver
- Arnd Meißl (born 1968), Austrian politician
- Arndt Norrgård (born 1942), Finnish sports sailor
- Arnd Peiffer (born 1987), German biathlete
- Arndt Pekurinen (1905–1941), Finnish pacifist and conscientious objector
- Arnd Scheel (born 1966), German mathematician
- Arnd Schmitt (born 1965), German fencer

== Surname ==
- Adolf Arndt (1904–1974), German politician
- Alfred Arndt (1896–1976), German architect
- Al Arndt (1911–1969), American football player
- Anja Arndt (born 1966), German politician
- Bettina Arndt (born 1949), Australian sex therapist
- Charles C. P. Arndt (1811–1842), American politician
- Charles Arndt (born c. 1967), United States soccer goalkeeper
- Chip Arndt (born 1966), American reality show contestant
- Danny Arndt (born 1955), Canadian ice hockey player
- Denis Arndt (1939–2025), American actor
- Dick Arndt (born 1944), American football player
- Eric Arndt (born 1986), American wrestler, better known as Enzo Amore
- Erich Arndt (cyclist) (1911–1961), German cyclist
- Erich Arndt (table tennis) (1938–2026), German table tennis player
- Ernst Moritz Arndt (1769–1860), German author/poet
- Ernst Arndt (1861–1942), German/Austrian actor
- Fabian Arndt (born 1995), German footballer
- Felix Arndt (1889–1918), American pianist & composer
- Fred Arndt (1917–2002), American basketball player
- Fritz Arndt (1885–1969), German chemist
- Fritz Arndt, (1910–2003), German Oberfeldwebel
- Gary Arndt (born 1969), American travel photographer & writer
- Gertrud Arndt (1903–2000), German art photographer
- Harry Arndt (1879–1921), American baseball player
- Heinz Arndt (1915–2002), Australian economist
- Ingrid Arndt-Brauer (born 1961), German politician (SPD)
- Jirka Arndt (born 1973), German Olympic long-distance runner
- Joe Arndt, American organist
- Johann Arndt (1555–1621), German theologian
- John Penn Arndt (1780–1861), American politician
- Judith Arndt (born 1976), German cyclist
- Jürgen Arndt, German rower
- Karl M. Arndt (1901–1956), American economist
- Melanie Arndt (born 1977), German historian
- Michael Arndt, American screenwriter
- Moses Arndt (born 1964), German politician, author and publisher
- Paweł Arndt (born 1954), Polish politician
- Rudolf Arndt (1835–1900), German psychiatrist
- Stefan Arndt (born 1961), German film producer
- Walther Arndt (1891–1944), German zoologist/physician
- Walter W. Arndt (1916–2011), American professor

== See also ==
- Arndt Lake, California
- Arndt Verlag, German book publisher
- Arndt-Schulz rule
- Arndt-Eistert synthesis
- Arend (given name)
- Arend (surname)
- Arendt (surname)
- Arent (given name)
- Arent (surname)
