= Arends =

Arends is a Dutch and Low German patronymic surname, meaning "son of Arend". It may refer to:

- Brett Arends (born 1968), American business journalist
- Carolyn Arends (born 1968), Canadian singer-songwriter
- Georg Arends (1863–1952), German botanist and gardener
- Henri Arends (1921–1993), Dutch conductor
- Isabel Arends (born 1966), Dutch chemist
- Jacco Arends (born 1991), Dutch badminton player
- Jan Arends (1738–1805), Dutch landscape and marine painter
- Leopold Arends (1817–1882), German stenographer
- Leslie C. Arends (1895–1985), American politician from Illinois
- Richard Arends (born 1990), Dutch footballer
- Sander Arends (born 1991), Dutch tennis player

== See also ==
- Angela Ahrendts (born 1960), US businesswoman
- Arent Arentsz (1585–1631), Dutch painter
- Ahrén
- Ahrend
- Ahrendt
- Ahrens
- Arend
- Arent
- Arents
