= Arend =

Arend may refer to:

- Arend (locomotive), one of the two first steam locomotives in the Netherlands
- Arend, Iran, a village
- Arendsee (lake) or Lake Arend, Saxony-Anhalt, Germany
- 50P/Arend or Comet Arend, a periodic comet
- De Arend (disambiguation), the name of various Dutch windmills
- Arend (given name)
- Arend (surname)

== See also ==
- Angela Ahrendts (born 1960), US businesswoman
- Arent Arentsz (1585–1631), Dutch painter
- Ahrén
- Ahrend
- Ahrens
- Ahrendt
- Arends
- Arent
- Arents
