= Arens =

Arens is a surname. Notable people with the surname include:

- Cody Arens (born 1993), American actor
- Egmont Arens (1889–1966), American publisher
- Henry M. Arens (1873–1963), American politician
- Jan-Hein Arens (born 1974), Dutch painter
- Josy Arens (1952–2024), Belgian farmer and politician
- Logan Arens (born 1993), American actor
- Maarten Arens (born 1972), Dutch judoka
- Moshe Arens (1925–2019), Israeli politician
- Richard Friederich Arens (1919–2000), American mathematician
- Teresa Trzaskowska née Arens, Rafał Trzaskowski mother

== See also ==
- Arends
- Ahrens (disambiguation)
- Ahrendt
- Ahrendts
