= Arent =

Arent can refer to:

- Arent (given name)
- Arent (surname)
- Arent Fox Schiff, American law firm and lobbying group

== See also ==
- Angela Ahrendts (born 1960), US businesswoman
- Arent Arentsz (1585–1631), Dutch painter
- Ahrén
- Ahrend
- Ahrens
- Ahrendt
- Arend
- Arends
- Arents
- Aren't
