= Ahrén =

Ahren, Ahrén or Åhrén is a surname. "Ahren" is also a masculine given name. Notable people with the name include:

== Surname ==
- Gunilla Ahren, Swedish para-alpine skier
- Nils Ahrén (1877–1928), Swedish silent film actor
- Per-Olov Ahrén (1926–2004), Swedish clergyman
- Thomas Åhrén, Sámi-Norwegian politician
- Uno Åhrén (1897–1977), Swedish architect and city planner

== Given name ==
- Ahren Belisle, Canadian stand-up comedian
- Ahren Spylo, Canadian ice hockey player
- Ahren Warner (born 1986), British poet

== See also ==
- Angela Ahrendts (born 1960), US businesswoman
- Arent Arentsz (1585–1631), Dutch painter
- Ahrend
- Ahrendt
- Ahrens
- Arend
- Arends
- Arent
- Arents
