= Arents =

Arents is a Dutch and German patronymic surname ("son of Arent"). The form Arentsz. is primarily known as a patronym. Notable people with the surname include:

- Albert Arents (1840–1914), German-American metallurgist
- Grace Arents (1848–1926), American philanthropist
- George Arents (1916–1992), American racing driver
- Jupp Arents (1912–1984), German racing cyclist
- Mareks Ārents (born 1986), Latvian track and field athlete
- Marretje Arents (c. 1712–1748), Dutch fishwife and rebellion leader

Arentsz

- Arent Arentsz (Cabel) (1585–1631), Dutch painter
- Tyman Arentsz. Cracht (c.1595–1646), Dutch painter

== See also ==
- Angela Ahrendts (born 1960), US businesswoman
- Arent Arentsz. (1585–1631), Dutch painter
- Ahrén
- Ahrend
- Ahrens
- Ahrendt
- Arend
- Arends
- Arent
- Grace Arents Free Library
