= Thomas Ahrens =

Thomas Ahrens may refer to:

- Thomas Ahrens (rowing) (born 1948), German Olympic coxswain
- Thomas J. Ahrens (1936–2010), professor of geophysics
- Tom Ahrens, American nurse, researcher, and educator
