= Ahrendt =

Ahrendt is a German surname. Notable people with the surname include:

- Bernd Ahrendt, German rower
- Christian Ahrendt (born 1963), German politician
- Lothar Ahrendt (born 1936), German politician
- Peter Ahrendt (1934–2013), German sailor

== See also ==
- Angela Ahrendts (born 1960), US businesswoman
- Arent Arentsz (1585–1631), Dutch painter
- Ahrén
- Ahrend
- Ahrens
- Arend
- Arends
- Arent
- Arents
