= Aharoni =

Aharoni (Hebrew: אהרוני) is a surname. Notable people with the surname include:

- Amikam Aharoni (1929–2002), Israeli physicist
- Israel Aharoni (1882–1946), Jewish zoologist
- Oren Aharoni (born 1973), Israeli basketball coach and former basketball player
- Ron Aharoni (born 1952), Israeli mathematician
- Yisrael Aharoni (born 1953), Israeli chef
- Yohanan Aharoni, né Aronheim (1919–1976), Israeli archaeologist
- Zvi Aharoni, né Arendt (1921–2012), Israeli Mossad agent

== Other uses ==
- Aharoni (typeface) is a Hebrew typeface family

== See also ==
- Arnheim (disambiguation)
- Arendt (surname)
