= 1727 =

1727 in various calendars
- Gregorian calendar: 1727; MDCCXXVII
- Ab urbe condita: 2480
- Armenian calendar: 1176; ԹՎ ՌՃՀԶ
- Assyrian calendar: 6477
- Balinese saka calendar: 1648–1649
- Bengali calendar: 1133–1134
- Berber calendar: 2677
- British Regnal year: 13 Geo. 1 – 1 Geo. 2
- Buddhist calendar: 2271
- Burmese calendar: 1089
- Byzantine calendar: 7235–7236
- Chinese calendar: 丙午年 (Fire Horse); 4424 or 4217 — to — 丁未年 (Fire Goat); 4425 or 4218
- Coptic calendar: 1443–1444
- Discordian calendar: 2893
- Ethiopian calendar: 1719–1720
- Hebrew calendar: 5487–5488
- Hindu calendars
- Vikram Samvat: 1783–1784
- Shaka Samvat: 1648–1649
- Kali Yuga: 4827–4828
- Holocene calendar: 11727
- Igbo calendar: 727–728
- Iranian calendar: 1105–1106
- Islamic calendar: 1139–1140
- Japanese calendar: Kyōhō 12 (享保１２年)
- Javanese calendar: 1651–1652
- Julian calendar: Gregorian minus 11 days
- Korean calendar: 4060
- Minguo calendar: 185 before ROC 民前185年
- Nanakshahi calendar: 259
- Thai solar calendar: 2269–2270
- Tibetan calendar: མེ་ཕོ་རྟ་ལོ་ (male Fire-Horse); 1853 or 1472 or 700 — to — མེ་མོ་ལུག་ལོ་ (female Fire-Sheep); 1854 or 1473 or 701

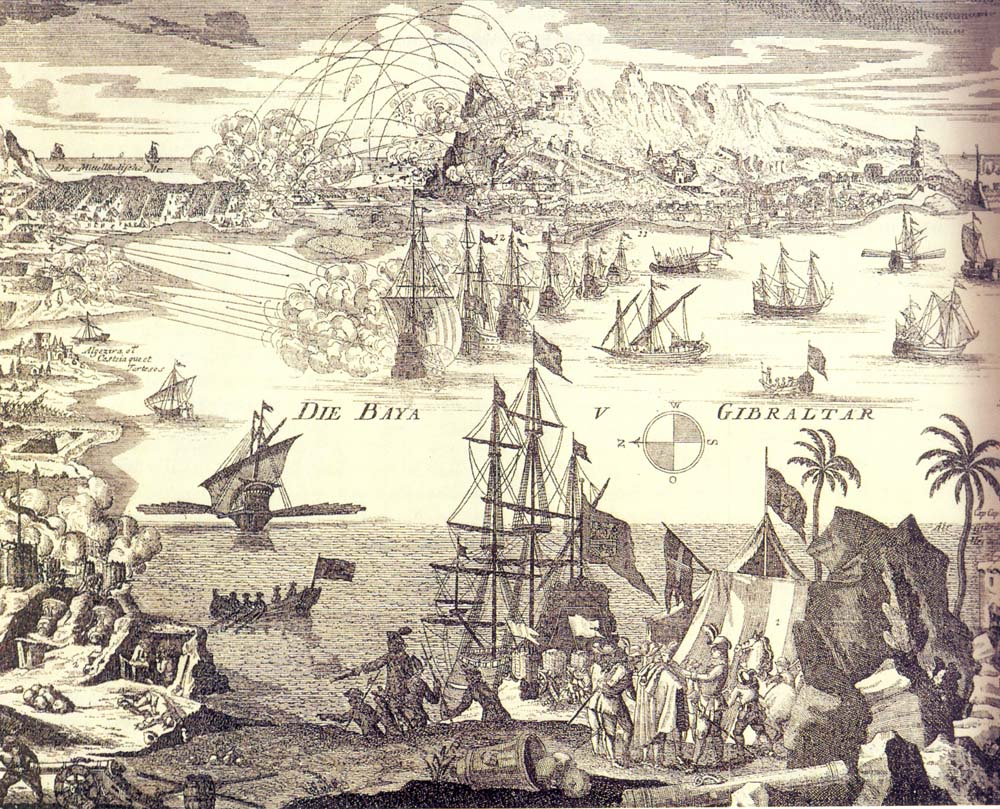
February 11: The Siege of Gibraltar begins.

1727 (MDCCXXVII) was a common year starting on Wednesday of the Gregorian calendar and a common year starting on Sunday of the Julian calendar, the 1727th year of the Common Era (CE) and Anno Domini (AD) designations, the 727th year of the 2nd millennium, the 27th year of the 18th century, and the 8th year of the 1720s decade. As of the start of 1727, the Gregorian calendar was 11 days ahead of the Julian calendar, which remained in localized use until 1923.

== Events ==
=== January–March ===
- January 1 – (December 21, 1726 O.S.) Spain's ambassador to Great Britain demands that the British return Gibraltar after accusing Britain of violating the terms of the 1713 Treaty of Utrecht. Britain refuses and the Thirteenth Siege of Gibraltar begins on February 22.
- January 6 – Martin Spanberg and two other members of the First Kamchatka expedition arrive in Okhotsk, after a journey from Saint Petersburg of almost two years. After the end of winter, the 63-member group, commanded by Vitus Bering, proceeds to the Kamchatka River, to prepare for exploration of the Arctic.
- January 9 – The world-famous Charité Hospital is established in Berlin, to be used for research and to help the poor. Prussia's King Frederick William I had ordered the conversion of a 16-year old institution, originally built in anticipation of an epidemic of the bubonic plague.
- January 12 – Abd el-Sayed of Egypt is enthroned, as Pope John XVII of Alexandria becomes the leader of the Coptic Christian Church, as the 105th Pope of Alexandria and Patriarch of the Holy See of St. Mark. He will serve until his death on April 20, 1745.
- February 2 – Johann Sebastian Bach's solo cantata, Ich habe genug, BWV 82, premieres in Leipzig.
- February 20 – German composer George Frideric Handel becomes a British subject.
- February 22 (February 11, 1726 O.S.) – Spain besieges the British-held territory of Gibraltar, in order to recapture it. Britain's Royal Navy begins a blockade of Spanish ports and the unsuccessful siege ends with the signing of a truce on June 24.
- March 4 – Battle of Halidzor in Armenia: A small group of defenders overcomes a much larger Ottoman Empire army.
- March 9 – The west African Kingdom of Dahomey, ruled by King Trudo Agaja, conquers and annexes the Kingdom of Xwéda, after King Haffon is killed in battle (three years earlier, Agaja conquered the neighboring state of Allada).
- March 22 – After 55 years as Sultan of Morocco, Ismail Ibn Sharif dies at the age of 81, prompting a 30-year battle between seven of his sons, for succession to the throne.

=== April–June ===
- April 11 – Johann Sebastian Bach's St Matthew Passion (BWV 244b) premieres at St. Thomas Church, Leipzig.
- May 12 – History of the Moravian Church: The 18th century renewal: The Brotherly Agreement is adopted by the Moravian Church community at Herrnhut, under the influence of Count Nicolaus Zinzendorf, beginning the Church's renewal.
- May 17 – Peter II of Russia is made Emperor of Russia at eleven years of age.
- May 31 – The Royal Bank of Scotland is founded by Royal Charter in Edinburgh.
- June 22 (July 11 Old Style) – George, Prince of Wales, becomes King George II of Great Britain, on the death of his father.
- June 23 – Spain ceases hostilities after its attempt to recapture Gibraltar from Britain fails. A truce is signed the next day.
- June 27 – Uxbridge, Massachusetts, is incorporated as a town.

=== July–September ===
- July 1 – In India, Shuja-ud-Din Muhammad Khan becomes the new Nawab of Bengal after the death of his father-in-law, Murshid Quli Khan. At the time, Bengal consists of what is now the nation of Bangladesh and the southeast Indian state of West Bengal and is subservient to the Mughal Empire.
- July 23 – Seventeen Ursuline Sisters from France land in New Orleans, in the Louisiana territory of New France, after a journey that began on February 22. They later create the orphanage which is the predecessor of Catholic Charities and the Ursuline Academy, the oldest Catholic school in the United States.
- August 13 – History of the Moravian Church: The 18th century renewal: The Moravian Church community at Herrnhut undergoes a profound spiritual awakening during a communion service.
- August 14 – Elections for the House of Commons begin in Great Britain and continue until October 17.
- August 30 – Anne, eldest daughter of King George II of Great Britain, is given the title Princess Royal.
- September 8 – A barn fire during a puppet show in the village of Burwell, Cambridgeshire, England, kills 78 people, many of them children. Another report says that all but six of the 160 persons assembled were killed in the accidental fire.

=== October–December ===
- October 11 – George II of Great Britain is crowned. Handel's Coronation Anthems are composed for the event, including Zadok the Priest, which has been played at every subsequent Coronation of the British monarch.
- October 17 – With voting for the British House of Commons concluding, the Whigs, led by Sir Robert Walpole, increase their supermajority, winning 415 of the 558 seats. The Tories share of Commons decreases from 169 to 128.
- November 18 – Tabriz earthquake, Persia kills 77,000.
- November 21 – The Netherlands signs the Treaty of Seville.
- November 27 – The foundation stone of the Jerusalem Church in Berlin is laid.
- December 8 – For the first time since the union of England and Scotland into Great Britain, the Royal Bank of Scotland, which still retains the right to print currency, issues its first pound note, printing paper currency for twenty shillings. The Scottish pound note continues to be printed until 2001 when the smallest denomination becomes a five pound note.
- December 17 – The London Evening Post, a conservative newspaper, publishes its first issue. It continues in regular publication for 70 years.

=== Date unknown ===
- An old woman known as Janet (Jenny) Horne of Loth, Sutherland becomes the last alleged witch in the British Isles to be executed, when she is burned at the stake in Dornoch, Scotland. (Some sources give the date as June 1722.)
- The first Amish move to North America.
- 1727–1800 – Lt. Col. Francisco de Mello Palheta smuggles coffee seeds to Brazil in a bouquet, starting a coffee empire.

== Births ==
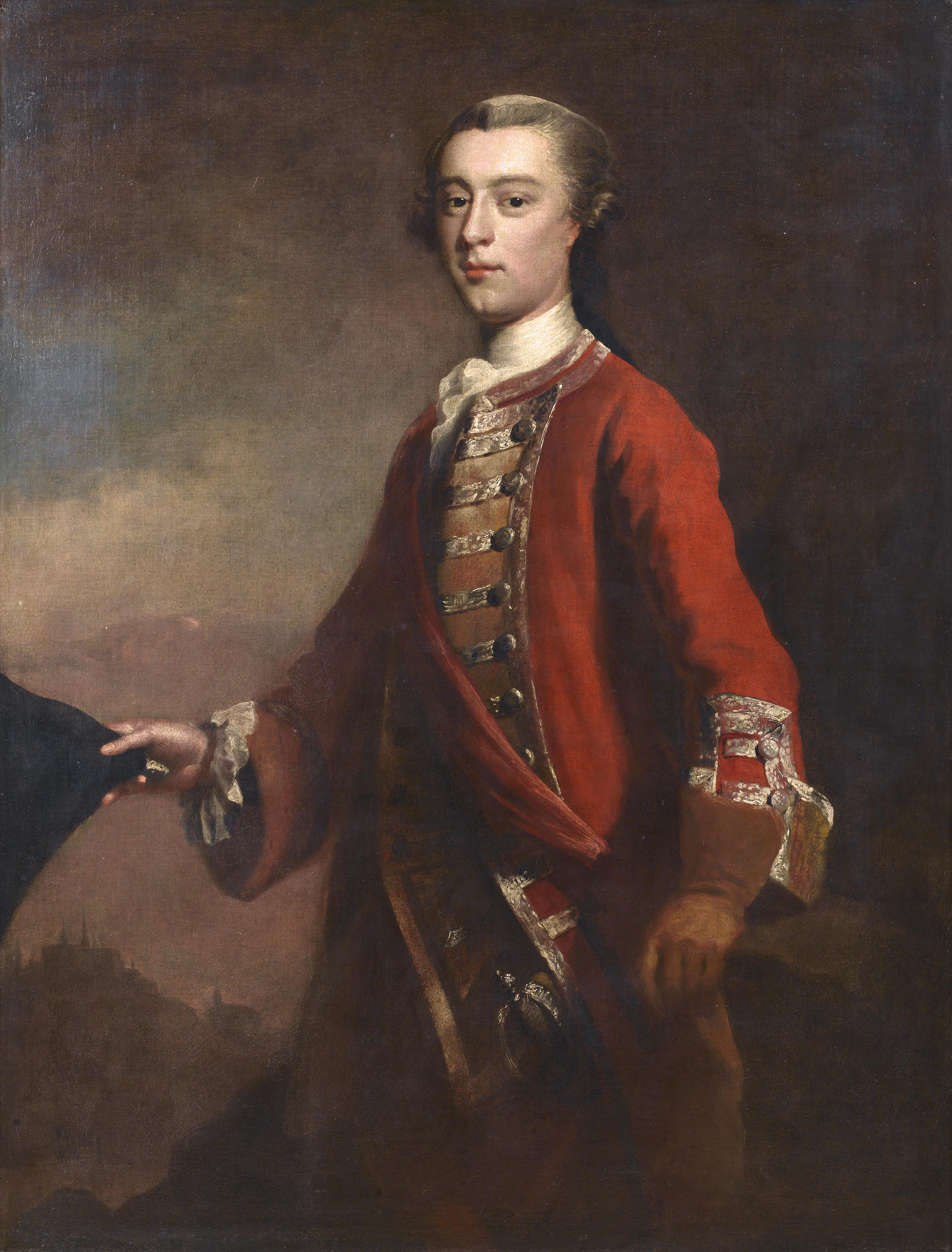
James Wolfe

- January 2 – James Wolfe, British general (d. 1759)
- January 25 – Aron Gustaf Silfversparre, Swedish baron (d. 1818)
- May 10 – Anne Robert Turgot, French statesman (d. 1781)
- May 14 – Thomas Gainsborough, English artist (d. 1788)
- July 26 – Horatio Gates, retired British soldier who served as an American general during the American Revolutionary War (d. 1806)
- August 14
  - Henriette of France, daughter of King Louis XV (d. 1752)
  - Princess Louise-Élisabeth of France, daughter of King Louis XV (d. 1759)
- August 22 – Johann Joseph Gassner, German priest (d. 1779)
- October 23 – Empress Xiaoyichun of China (d. 1775)
- November 26 – Artemas Ward, American major general (d. 1800)
- December 6 – Johann Gottfried Zinn, German anatomist, botanist (d. 1757)
- December 27 – Arthur Murphy, Irish writer (d. 1805)

== Deaths ==
- January 17 – Johann Christoph Wichmannshausen, German philosopher (b. 1663)
- January 24 – Magdalena Stenbock, Swedish salon hostess (b. 1649)
- February 6 – Charles Boit, Swedish enameller, miniature painter (b. 1662)
- February 10 – Procopio Cutò, French entrepreneur (b. 1651)
- February 13 – William Wotton, English scholar (b. 1666)
- February 22 – Francesco Gasparini, Italian composer (b. 1661)
- February 23 – Lionel Tollemache, 3rd Earl of Dysart, British politician and nobleman (b. 1649)

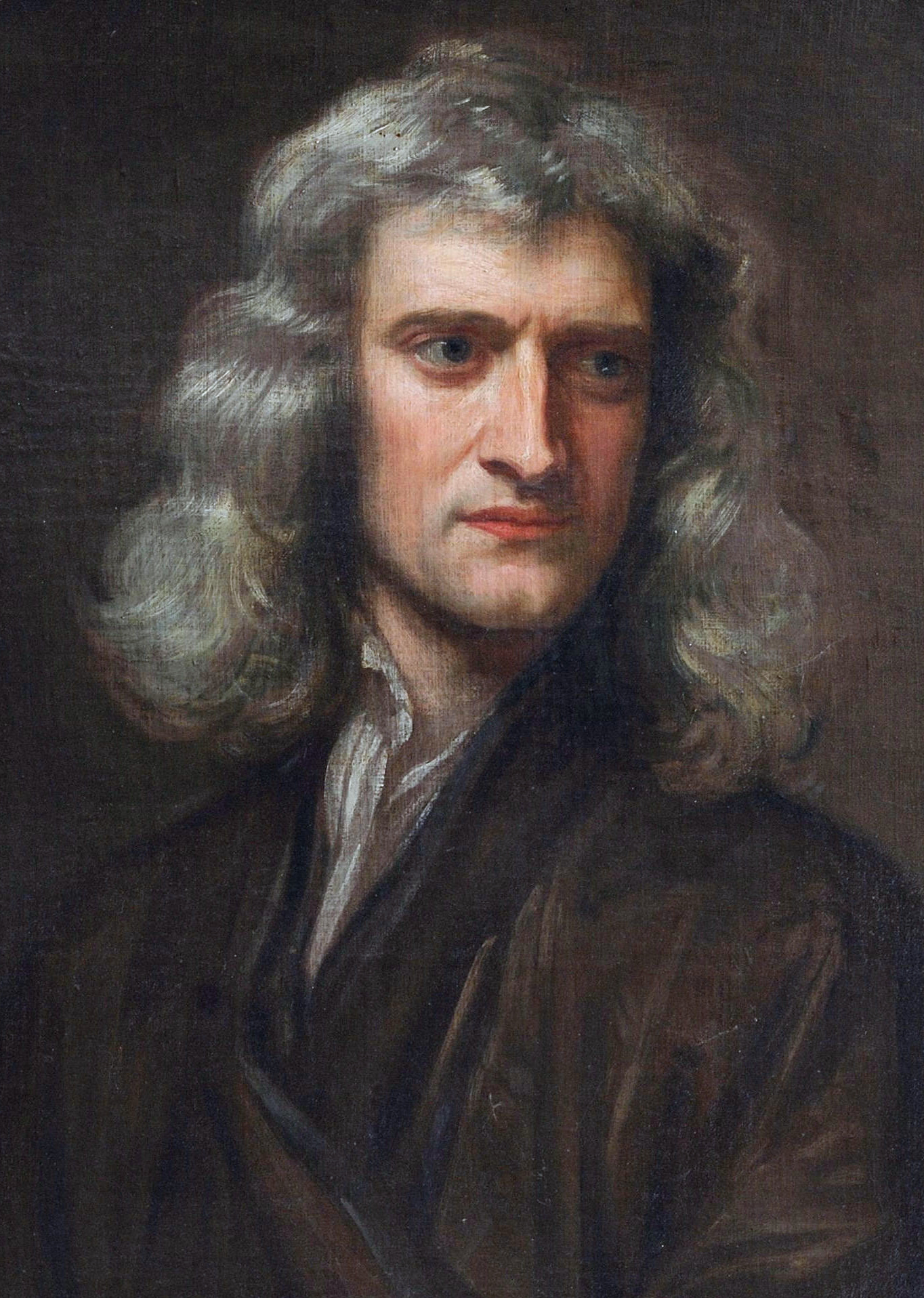
Isaac Newton

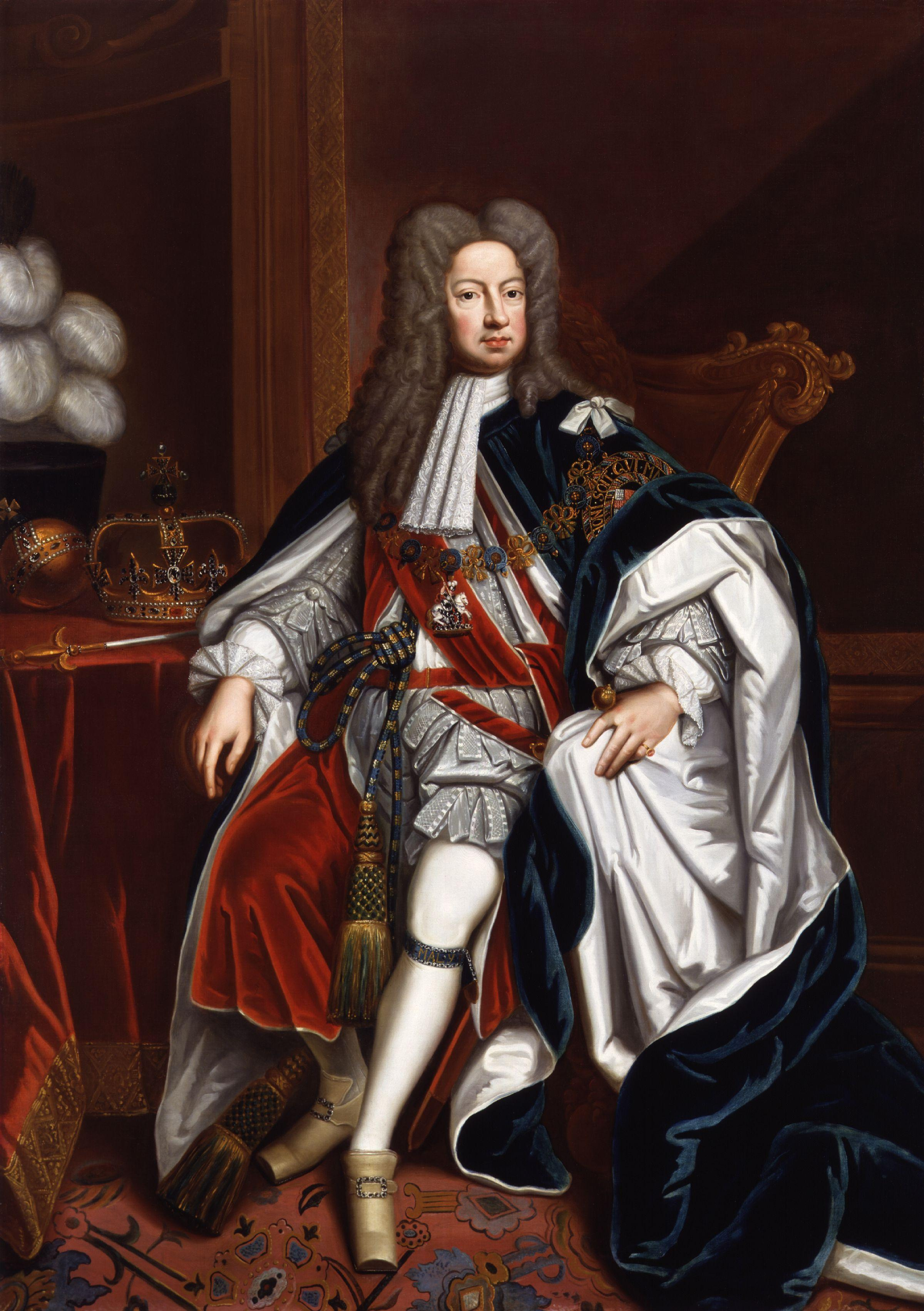
George I of Great Britain

- March 31 [O.S. March 20] – Sir Isaac Newton, English scientist (b. 1643)
- April 15 – George Compton, 4th Earl of Northampton (b. 1664)
- May 17 – Empress Catherine I of Russia (b. 1684)
- June 8 – August Hermann Francke, German Protestant minister (b. 1663)
- June 11
  - Richard Hill of Hawkstone, English statesman (b. 1655)
  - King George I of Great Britain (b. 1660)
- July 9 – Veronica Giuliani, Italian nun, mystic (b. 1660)
- July 23 – Simon Harcourt, 1st Viscount Harcourt, Lord Chancellor of Great Britain (b. c. 1660)
- August 4 – Victor-Maurice, comte de Broglie, French general (b. 1647)
- August 14 – William Croft, English composer (b. 1678)
- August 17 – Louis, Duke of Rohan, French noble (b. 1652)
- August 27 – Aert de Gelder, Dutch painter (b. 1645)
- September 6 – George Hooper, Bishop of St Asaph
  Bishop of Bath and Wells (b. 1640)
- September 7 – Glückel of Hameln, German businesswoman and diarist (b. 1647)
- September 8 – Giuseppe Bartolomeo Chiari, Italian painter (b. 1654)
- September 25
  - Jakob Abbadie, Swiss Protestant preacher (b. c. 1654)
  - Sarah Kemble Knight, colonial Massachusetts diarist (b. 1666)
- October 2 – Johann Conrad Brunner, Swiss anatomist (b. 1653)
- October 10
  - Charles III, Prince of Guéméné, French nobleman (b. 1655)
  - Robert Rochfort, Irish politician (b. 1652)
- November 10 – Alphonse de Tonty, French explorer and American settler (b. 1659)
- December 22 – Louis Phélypeaux, comte de Pontchartrain (b. 1643)
- December 26
  - Jean-Baptiste de La Croix de Chevrières de Saint-Vallier, Catholic bishop of Quebec (b. 1653)
  - Baltasar de Zúñiga, 1st Duke of Arión, viceroy of New Spain (b. 1658)
- date unknown
  - Alessio Erardi, Maltese painter (b. 1669)
  - Pietro Erardi, Maltese chaplain and painter (b. 1644)
  - Jesse of Kartli, King of Georgia (b. 1680 or 1681)
  - Basil Matthew II, Syriac Orthodox Maphrian of the East
