= Arendt (surname) =

Arendt is a German surname.

Notable people with the surname include:

- Adrian Arendt (born 1952), Romanian sailor
- Aleksander Arendt (1912–2002), president of Kashubian-Pomeranian Association
- Ana Paula Arendt (born R. P. Alencar; 1980), writer, a poet, and a Brazilian diplomat
- Carl Arendt (1838–1902), German sinologist and diplomat
- Ekkehard Arendt (1892–1954), Austrian stage and film actor
- Erich Arendt (1903–1984), German poet and translator
- Fernande Arendt (born 1891, date of death unknown), Belgian tennis player
- Gisela Arendt (1918–1969), German swimmer
- Hannah Arendt (1906–1975), German-born American political theorist
- Helga Arendt (1964–2013), German sprinter
- Henriette Arendt (1874–1922), German writer and policewoman
- Isabella Arendt (born 1993), Danish politician
- Nicole Arendt (born 1969), American tennis player
- Niels Henrik Arendt (1950–2015), Church of Denmark prelate
- Olga Arendt (born Olga Morgenstern; 1859–1902), German writer and stage actress
- Ronny Arendt (born 1980), German professional ice hockey player
- Walter Arendt (1925–2005), German politician

== See also ==
- Arendt de Roy (died 1589), Flemish architect
- Arendt-Seymour
- Kemp-Arendt
