= Meissl =

Meissl (German: Meißl) is a German surname which may refer to:

- Arnd Meißl (born 1968), an Austrian politician
- Emerich Meissl, mathematician known for co-development of the Reichert-Meissl-Wollny value
