= Heinrich Roller =

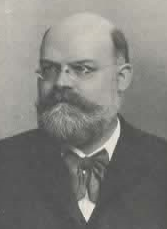
- Born: 10 March 1839; Berlin, Germany
- Died: 6 September 1916 (aged 77); Berlin, Germany
- Other name: Roland vom Hochplateau
- Occupation: author
- Known for: inventing a German shorthand system

Christian Heinrich Roller (10 March 1839 – 6 September 1916), better known as Heinrich Roller and also known by his pen name Roland vom Hochplateau, was the inventor of a German shorthand system. Roller was also a writer of humorist texts and a professor at the "Journalistische Hochschule" in Berlin.

== Early life ==
Roller was considered a talented child in school and was the best of his class, yet, being the child of poor parents, he was not able to attend a higher-level school. Instead, although against his wishes, he began an apprenticeship to become a carpenter. In 1859, he became a member of the Berlin craftsmen association and developed an interest for stenography (or shorthand) when he lost a bid for secretary to the board to a candidate who knew shorthand. He then went on to learn stenography from Leopold Arends who taught at the association.

In 1869, Roller founded the "Stenographisches Institut zur Erteilung von Unterricht und Ausbildung praktischer Stenographen" (stenographic institute for the teaching and instruction of practical stenographers) where he taught Arends' stenography system. After conflicts over his role at this institute, he founded the "Arendsscher Stenographen-Bund" (Arends stenographers' association) and published the "Vollständige Lehrbuch der Volksstenographie (System Arends)" (complete textbook of the peoples' stenography (Arends' system)" which soon proved to be more popular than Arends' own textbook. Arends' responded first with verbal attacks and then sued Roller but he was acquitted of all charges.

== Roller's shorthand system ==
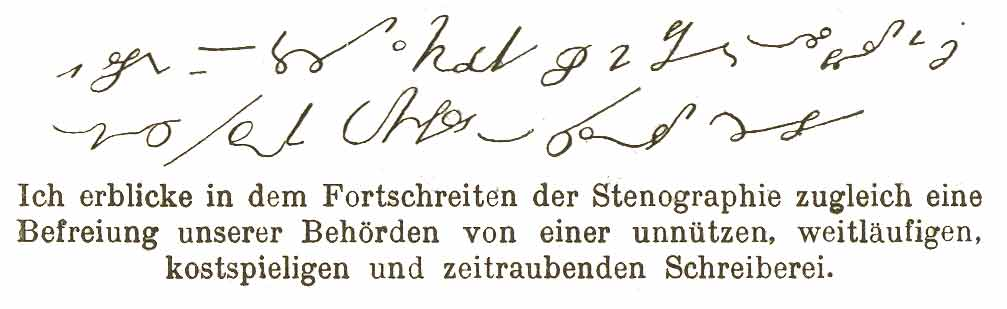
Example of Roller's shorthand.

As a result of the conflict with Arends, Roller decided to develop his own shorthand system which he published under the title "Vollständiger Leitfaden einer einfachen, in wenigen Stunden erlernbaren Stenographie für den Schul-, Korrespondenz- und parlamentarischen Gebrauch" (complete instructions to a simple, in a few hours learnable stenographic system for school, correspondence and parliament usage) on 1 October 1875. The book was published in 24 editions between 1875 and 1898. Roller made frequent adjustments to the system in the following years.

In 1892, Roller released "Praktischen Kürzungen" (practical abbreviations), after having been asked to do so by his supporters, which contained abbreviations for common words used in speeches. In 1902, the now existing "Hauptverband der Roller'schen Schule" (association of Roller's school [of stenography]) named the system "Rollers Weltstenographie" (Roller's world stenography).

When the Deutsche Einheitskurzschrift was discussed, Roller argued for his system personally.

== Politics ==
In 1864, Roller became a journalist with the magazine Social‑Demokrat. In 1865, he became secretary-general of the Allgemeiner Deutscher Arbeiterverein (one of the predecessors of the Social Democratic Party of Germany) but quit the job in 1868 because of differences in opinion. He also attended the founding congress of the Social Democratic Workers' Party of Germany in 1869 and chronicled the whole event using shorthand.

== Career as a writer ==
Besides his work in the field of stenography, Roller published humor texts as well as merry poems and songs under his pen name Roland vom Hochplateau.

== Death and legacy ==
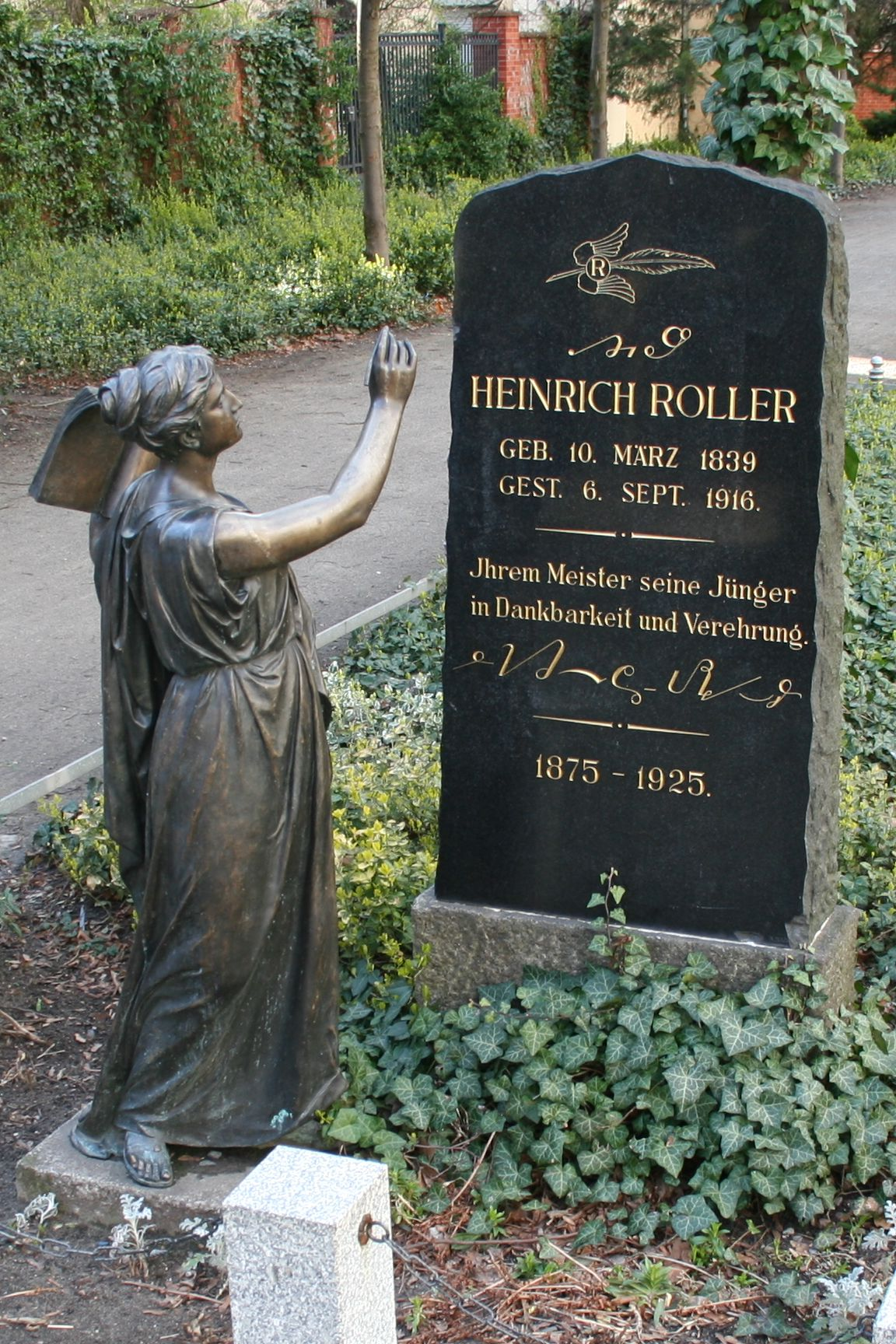
Roller's tomb stone, engraved with an example of his shorthand system.

Roller died on 6 September 1916 in Berlin. His body was buried at the "Friedhofspark Pappelallee", a cemetery founded by the religious humanist society of Berlin and his tomb stone is one of only few that remain there until today.

On 25 November 1925, Heinersdorfer Straße (1866–1925) in Berlin-Prenzlauer Berg was renamed Heinrich-Roller-Straße to commemorate the 50th anniversary of his invention.

== Bibliography ==
- Humoristische Erinnerungen aus dem alten Berlin. Eine Reise kurzweiliger und belehrender Erzählungen aus der Mitte dieses Jahrhunderts (4th ed.). Berlin: self-published.
- Vollständiger Lehrgang einer einfachen, in wenigen Stunden erlernbaren Stenographie für den Schul-, Korrespondenz- und parlamentarischen Gebrauch (26th ed.). Berlin: self-published. 1899.
