= Johan Gerhard de Besche =

Norwegian physician and newspaper owner

Johan Gerhard de Besche (31 May 1821 – 19 February 1875) was a Norwegian medical doctor and owner of the Morgenbladet newspaper.

He was born at Kongsberg in Buskerud, Norway. He was a son of Joachim Christopher de Besche and Elizabeth Birgitte Bergh. The family had migrated to Sweden from the Netherlands in the 16th century, and one branch from there to Norway in the 17th century.

He enrolled as a student in 1839, and graduated with a Candidate of Medicine degree in 1843. In March 1845 in Kristiania (now Oslo), he married Catharina Marie Hviid (1824–1879). When his mother-in-law died in 1863, de Besche inherited half of the newspaper Morgenbladet, an influential conservative publication. He bought the other half from the family of Adolf Bredo Stabell (1807–1865) in 1865.

From 1846 he worked as a physician in the military, contributing to journals including Militært Tidsskrift and Den Militære Tilskuer in addition to medical journals. In 1849 he volunteered in the First Schleswig War. He was then a royal physician to Charles XV of Sweden from 1857 to 1869. He died in 1875 at Frognerhoug in Aker. The Morgenbladet newspaper was passed down to his son Oscar de Besche (1846–1909), whereas his grandson Arent Greve de Besche became notable in the field of medicine.
