= International Ski Instructors Association =

The International Ski Instructors Association (ISIA) is the world body for professional ski instructors.

As an international organisation for the protection and promotion of the interests of professional ski instructors (skiing and other snow sports), the ISIA supports:

- Stronger relationship between individual national ski instructor associations
- Collaboration in respect of ski technique, methodology, didactic and questions

of safety

- The exchange of information
- Internal and external opinion forming concerning the profession of ski

instructor.

The task of the ISIA is to support the professional practice of ski and snow sports teaching in all its forms, and it collaborates with other associations from the worlds of skiing and tourism. Research into ski techniques, methodology and didactic fields of skiing and every related branch is supported by the ISIA, within the realms of its ability.

== History ==
The first steps for creating ISIA were actually undertaken by the main Alpine countries, in 1962, during the Interski Congress in Monte Bondone (Italy). A first congress on a visioning for an International Association for the Professional Ski Instructors, was held in 1964, under the leadership of the French Gaston Cathiard .

Eventually, ISIA was officially formed in 1970, when the first ISIA Constitution was written, and when Karl Gamma became the first President. The legal site of the Association is in Bern. The headquarters were in Belp, Switzerland, nearby Bern, until May 2018, then moved to Grainau, Germany, near Garmisch.

There are currently 37 member nations representing the very best in ski instruction around the world.
