= Arend (surname) =

Arend and Arent are primarily Low German patronymic surnames from the given name Arend. The Dutch surnames "Van den Arend" and "Den Arend" mean "(from) the eagle" and have a toponymic origin. Notable people with the surname include:

Arend

- Anthony Clark Arend (born 1958), American legal scholar
- Christophe Arend (born 1975), French politician
- Dieter Arend (1914–?), German rower
- Geoffrey Arend (born 1978), American actor
- Harry Arend (1903–1966), American judge from Alaska
- René Arend (1928–2016), Luxembourgish-American chef
- Sylvain Arend (1902–1992), Belgian astronomer
- Vivian Arend (born 1965), Canadian novelist
- Willy Arend (1876–1964), German track cyclist

Arent

- Benno von Arent (1898–1956), German stage designer and architect
- Eddi Arent (1925–2013), German actor and comedian
- Patrice M. Arent (born 1956), American politician from Utah

Den Arend

- Arie den Arend (1903–1982), Dutch composer
- Lucien den Arend (born 1943), Dutch sculptor

Van den Arend

- Willem van den Arend (1875-1954), Dutch painter and engraver

== See also ==
- Arends, Dutch surname of the same origin
- Arend (given name)
- Hannah Arendt, German American historian, philosopher and political theorist
