= Matthias Ahrens =

German skier

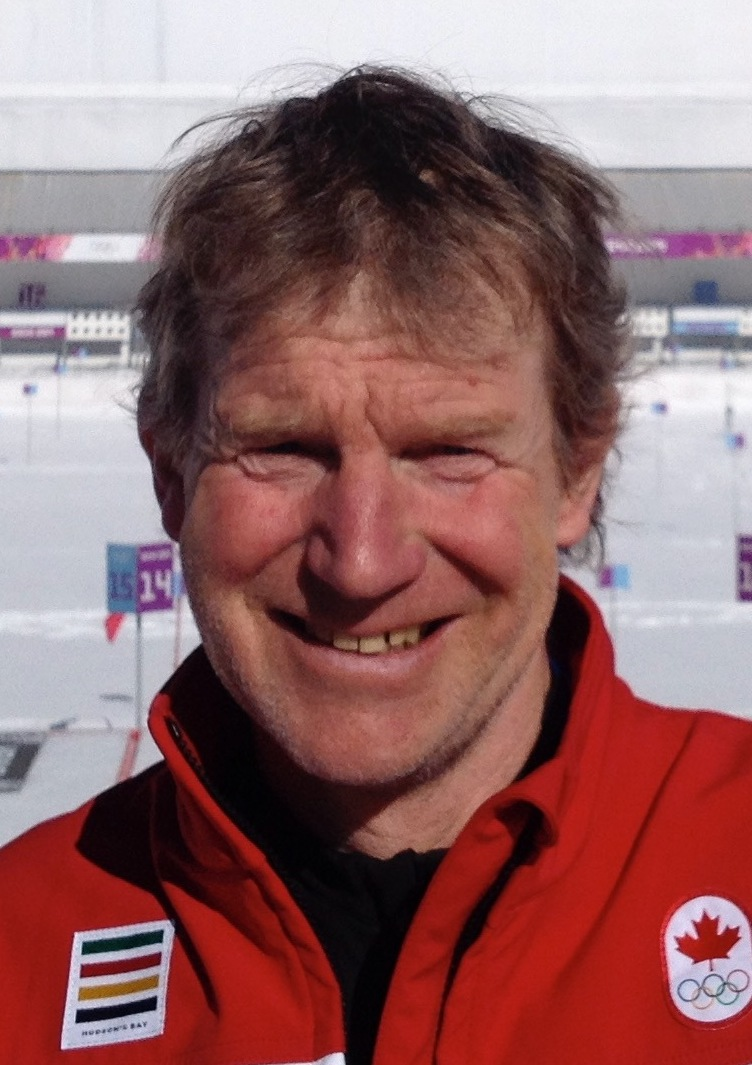

Personal information
- Full name: Matthias Ahrens
- Born: 26 May 1961 (age 65) Ort, West Germany

Sport

Professional information
- Sport: Biathlon

Matthias Ahrens (born 26 May 1961) is a former German biathlete, cross-country skier and current coach.

== Career ==
Matthias Ahrens competed as a cross-country skier and biathlete between 1978 and 1984. After his active career as an athlete he became a cross-Country ski and biathlon coach. He is a chartered professional coach certified at NCCP level 5. He is also an internationally certified IFMGA mountain guide and ISIA level 4 certified ski instructor.

In 2004, he became a member of Biathlon Canada's coaching staff at the National Training Centre in Canmore, Alberta.

== Achievements ==
In 2005 and 2022, Ahrens was named as Biathlon Canada Coach of the Year. In 2012 he was appointed as head coach of the Canadian national biathlon team.

In this role he coached two athletes to World Cup race wins: Jean-Philippe Leguellec in 2012 and Nathan Smith in 2015. Since then, the Canadian team achieved its first ever male World Championship medal, won by Nathan Smith in the 2015 Biathlon World Championships, followed by a bronze medal at the 2016 World Championships in Oslo in the 4x7.5 km men's relay with Christian Gow, Nathan Smith, Scott Gow and Brendan Green.

In 2015 and 2016 Ahrens won the Petro-Canada Coaching Excellence Award. After 15 years as a coach with the Canadian national team, he left his role as head coach in April 2019, subsequently being appointed as head coach at the Biathlon Alberta Training Centre. In 2023 Ahrens left Canada and currently works as a youth and junior coach for the Bavarian Ski Association at the EdS Berchtesgaden.

Ahrens was named Canadian Biathlon Coach of the Year in 2005 and 2002, received the Petro-Canada Coaching Excellence Award in 2015 and 2016, and received the Myriam Bedard Award in 2023.
