= Arend (given name) =

Arend, Arent or Arendt (all pronounced [ˈaːrənt]) is a Dutch masculine given name. Arend means "eagle" in Dutch, but the name derives from Arnoud/Arnout, which itself stems from the Germanic elements aran "eagle" and wald "rule, power". The form Arent also occurs in Norway. People with the name include:

- Arend, Lord of Egmond (c. 1337–1409), Dutch nobility
- Arent Arentsz (1585–1631), Dutch landscape painter
- Arent Berntsen (1610–1680), Dano-Norwegian topographer and statistician
- Arent Greve de Besche (1878–1945), Norwegian bacteriologist
- Arend Bloem (born 1947), Dutch canoer
- Arend Jan Boekestijn (born 1959), Dutch politician
- Arend Braat (1874-1947), Dutch politician
- Arie van de Bunt (born 1969), Dutch water polo goalkeeper
- Arent S. Crowninshield (1843–1908), American rear admiral of the United States Navy
- Arent van Curler (1619–1667), Dutch settler in New Netherland
- Arent De Peyster (1736–1822), New York-born British military officer
- Arend Dijckman (1572–1627), Dutch merchant who briefly was Admiral of the Polish Navy
- Arent Nicolai Dragsted (1821–1898), Danish goldsmith
- Arent de Gelder (1645–1727), Dutch painter
- Arend Glas (born 1968), Dutch bobsledder
- Arend Johan van Glinstra (1754–1814), Dutch painter
- Arent Greve (1733–1808), Norwegian jeweler, goldsmith and painter
- Arend "Arie" Haan (born 1948), Dutch football player and coach
- Arend van Halen (1673–1732), Dutch portrait painter
- Arend Hassink (born 1950), Dutch former road bicycle racer
- Arent M. Henriksen (1946–2024), Norwegian politician
- Arend Heyting (1898–1980), Dutch mathematician and logician
- Arend van 't Hoft (born 1933), Dutch racing cyclist
- Arend de Keysere (died 1490), Flemish printer
- Arend Kisteman (born 1984), Dutch politician
- Arent Jacobsz Koets (c.1600–1635), Dutch guard painted by Frans Hals
- Arend Langenberg (1949–2012), Dutch voice actor and radio presenter
- Arend Lijphart (born 1936), Dutch political scientist
- Arend Lubbers (born 1931), American college administrator
- Arent Magnin (1825–1888), Dutch Governor of the Gold Coast
- Arent Passer (c.1560–1637), Dutch stonemason in Estonia
- Arent Roggeveen (died 1679), Dutch cartographer
- Arendt de Roy (died 1589), Flemish architect
- Arend Joan Rutgers (1903–1998), Dutch/Belgian physical chemist
- Arend Schoemaker (1911–1982), Dutch footballer
- Arent Schuyler (1662–1730), New Netherland surveyor, merchant, and land speculator, ancestor of Arent DePeyster and Arent Crowninshield
- Arent Gustaf Silfversparre (1727–1818), Swedish baron
- Arend Fokke Simonsz (1755–1812), Dutch writer and intellectual
- Arend "Arne" Slot (born 1978), Dutch football manager
- Arent Solem (1777–1857), Norwegian merchant
- Arend von Stryk (born 1970), Namibian footballer
- Arent van Soelen (1898–?), South African sports sailor
- Arend van der Wel (1933–2013), Dutch footballer
- Arent Jan Wensinck (1882–1939), Dutch Arabist
- Arend Friedrich Wiegmann (1770–1853), German pharmacist and botanist
- Arend Friedrich August Wiegmann (1802–1841), German zoologist and herpetologist, son of the above

== See also ==
- Arndt, a related given name
- Arend (surname)
