= Karl Matthews Arndt =

American economist

Karl Matthews Arndt (1901–1956) was a member of the White House Council of Economic Advisers. Previously he was an economics professor at the University of Nebraska.
