= Brigitte Ahrens =

German schlager-singer

Brigitte Ahrens (born 13 September 1945 in Chemnitz, Germany) is a German schlager-singer, who was well known in East Germany.

== Biography ==
Ahrens sang in the choir of the Klub der Jungen Talente in Karl-Marx-Stadt between 1961 and 1964. In 1967, she participated in Heinz Quermann's talent contest Herzklopfen kostenlos. She was successful in a microphone casting for the radio channel Rundfunk der DDR in East Berlin. At the Zentralen Studio für Unterhaltungskunst, she learned singing, ballet, acting and elocution.

Ahrens became well known through her appearances in the television channel DFF. She released several records on the Amiga label, and these have become collector's items in Germany and the Benelux countries. She appeared in concerts in Poland, Romania, Bulgaria, Hungary, Czechoslovakia, and the Benelux countries. She was musical editor at the regional radio channel Karl-Marx-Stadt and at its successor Sachsen Radio. After a long break, she released the CD Ich gehe auf die Fünfzig...na und? in 2005.

Ahrens gained third place in the East German Schlager Song Contest in 1971 with Wo ist die liebe Sonne composed by Arndt Bause. Her biggest success was Da ging für mich die Sonne auf, composed by Ralf Petersen in 1974.

== Discography ==
- 1968 Donaumelodie
- 1969 Heut ist mein Tag
- 1969 Warum hat er wieder nicht geschrieben
- 1969 Ade, ade, der Zug fährt ab
- 1969 Lass dich doch bald wieder sehen
- 1969 Was soll ich mit roten Rosen
- 1970 Halt dein Herz fest
- 1970 Du mit deinen Wanderaugen
- 1971 Alles dreht sich um uns beide
- 1971 Wenn dein Herz mir verzeiht
- 1971 Heut ist mein Tag
- 1971 Wo ist die liebe Sonne
- 1972 Und der Sommer kommt bald zurück
- 1972 Komm in den Tag
- 1974 Da ging für mich die Sonne auf
- 1974 Insel im Fluss
- 2005 CD Ich geh auf die Fünfzig … na und

== Songs in radio ==
- 1970 Mal mir einen Regenbogen
- 1971 Es geht weiter
- 1974 Schau nur auf die Sonnenuhr
