= Sieglinde Ahrens =

German organist and composer

- Born: Sieglinde Maria Ahrens; 19 February 1936 (age 90); Berlin, Germany
- Occupations: Organist; Composer
- Father: Joseph Ahrens

Sieglinde Maria Ahrens (born 19 February 1936, in Berlin) is a German organist and composer. She is the daughter of (Johannes Clemens) Joseph Ahrens (1904–1997), a German composer and organist. Ahrens studied music and composition under her father. After she completed her studies, she was an organist of Salvator-Kirche and professor of organ at Essen. She is author of a book on Messiaen's organ music, Das Orgelwerk Messiaens, Gilles u. Francke (1968), ASIN: B0007JD6XM.

== Works ==
Selected works include:

- DREI GESÄNGE NACH LATEINISCHEN PSALMTEXTEN (1963) Bass solo, Organ
- FANTASIE (1958) Organ
- SONATE (1957) Violin, Organ
- SUITE (1959) Organ

Aherns' work has been issued on CD including:

- Das Heilige Jahr - Orgelopus Von Joseph Ahrens by Sieglinde Ahrens and Joseph Ahrens (Audio CD)
- Eben - Organ Works by Petr Eben, Sieglinde Ahrens, and Martin Lenniger (Audio CD - 1992)
- Petr Eben - Organ Work by Petr Eben, Sieglinde Ahrens, and Rudolf Lodenkemper (Audio CD - 1993)
- Orgelwerke by Sieglinde Ahrens and Petr Eben (Audio CD)
