= Joseph Ahrens =

German composer and organist

Joseph Johannes Clemens Ahrens (April 17, 1904 in Sommersell – December 21, 1997 in Berlin) was a German composer and organist.

Ahrens received early training in organ and choral music with Wilhelm Schnippering in Büren and Fritz Volbach in Munich. He read choral studies at Gerleve Abbey and Beuron Abbey. From 1925-1928 he studied at the State Academy for Church and School Music (now called the Royal Music Institute of Berlin) under Alfred Sittard, Max Seiffert, and Wilhelm Middelschulte. In 1928 he began teaching organ playing and improvisation at the same academy. Between 1931 and 1940 Ahrens was the organist for the Berliner Philharmoniker, simultaneously serving as the organist for the Cathedral of St. Hedwig after 1934. From 1945 to 1957 he was organist at the Salvator-Kirche in Berlin-Wilmersdorf. He accepted a professorship in church music at the Berlin Hochschule für Musik in 1945 and remained there until 1969, serving as deputy director and professor of keyboard instruments from 1954 to 1958. From 1955 onward he was in charge of the church music department, and chairman of the state examination office for church music.

Ahrens was awarded the Berliner Kunstpreis in 1955, became a knight of the Order of St. Gregory the Great in 1956, and received a silver pontificate medal in Rome and fellowship to the Germany Academy in Rome at the Villa Massimo in 1968.

Ahrens was a noted organ improviser. His compositions often combined elements of prior liturgical music styles (such as Gregorian chant) with modern techniques like dodecaphony. A large portion of his output is written for the Catholic Church.

His daughter is the organist Sieglinde Ahrens.

== Works ==
Organ works

- Canzone in F (1930)
- Pange lingua, Hymnus (1935)
- Toccata eroica (1935)
- Partita "Christus ist erstanden" (1935)
- Fünf kleine Stücke (Five small pieces) (1936)
- Regina coeli (1937)
- Fantasie, Grave marcia funebre and Toccata in C minor (1939)
- Jesu, meine Freude, Partita (1942)
- Praeludium and Fugue in F minor (1942)
- Toccata and Fugue in E minor (1942)
- Concertino G Major (1943)
- Fantasie in B (1943)
- Orgelmesse (Organ Mass) (1945)
- Verleih uns Frieden gnädiglich, Partita (1947)
- Lobe den Herren, Partita (1947)
- Das Heilige Jahr (The Holy Year, Choral work for organ) 1948/50
- Cantiones Gregorianae pro organo I-III (1957)
- Verwandlungen I (1963), II (1964) und III (1965)
- Fünf Leisen (1969)
- Trilogia contrapunctica (1972,1975,1976)
- Canticum Organi I-III (1972,1975, 1976)
- Trilogia dodekaphonica (1978)

Other works

- Passion of St. Matthew (1950)
- Passion of St. John (1961)
- Sonata for viola and organ (or positive organ) (1953)
- various other choral works

== Writings ==
- Formprinzipien des gregorianischen Chorals und mein Orgelstil, Heidelberg 1978
- Von den Modi zur Dodekaphonie, Heidelberg 1979
