= Isabel Arends =

Dutch chemist and academic

Isabel W.C.E. Arends (born 1966) is a Dutch chemist and Director-General of the National Institute for Public Health and the Environment (RIVM).

During her academic career, her research focused on environmentally-friendly, or 'green', chemistry; for example, using enzymes as biocatalysts while avoiding the need for toxic solvents. Arends was elected a member of the Royal Netherlands Academy of Arts and Sciences (KNAW) in 2017.

== Academic career ==
Arends studied physical organic chemistry at Leiden University, between 1984 and 1988, obtaining an MsC. In 1993, she obtained her PhD at the same university with a thesis titled: 'Thermolysis of arene derivatives with coal-type hydrogen donors', studying with Prof. Rob Louw and Dr. Peter Mulder. After graduation, Arends spent a year as a postdoctoral researcher in Ottawa, Canada at the Steacie Institute for Molecular Sciences. She joined Delft University of Technology in 1995, and was awarded a research fellowship of the Royal Netherlands Academy of Arts and Sciences (KNAW) in the field of biomimetic oxidations.

Between 2001 and 2006, she worked as associate and assistant professor at Delft University of Technology. In 2007, she was promoted to full professor of Biocatalysis and Organic Chemistry. She served as the chair of the Biotechnology Department at Delft University of Technology from 2013 to 2018, vice-chair of the Applied and Engineering Sciences domain of the Netherlands Organisation for Scientific Research, and founded the TU Delft Bioengineering Institute in 2016.

In July 2018, Arends was appointed Professor of biocatalysis and organic chemistry at Utrecht University and dean of its Faculty of Science.

Since April 1st 2026, Arends is Director-General of the National Institute for Public Health and the Environment (RIVM).
