= Jan Arends =

Dutch painter

Jan Arends (11 September 1738 – 22 April 1805) was a Dutch painter. He was the brother of the poet Roelof Arends. He was a pupil of J. Ponse, and painted landscapes and marine subjects. Born in Dordrecht, he worked for many years in Amsterdam and Middelburg, but returned eventually to Dordrecht, where he died in 1805. He was well skilled in perspective, and practised engraving.
