= Henriette Arendt =

German writer and policewoman (1874–1922)

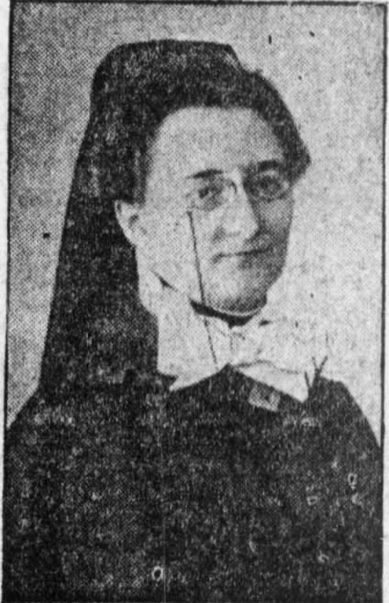
- Born: 11 November 1874; Königsberg, German Empire
- Died: 22 August 1922 (aged 47); Mainz, Germany
- Other names: Sister Henriette; Sister Henny
- Parents: Max Arendt; Johanna Wohlgemuth
- Relatives: Hannah Arendt (niece)

Henriette Arendt (11 November 1874 – 22 August 1922) was a German writer and policewoman. She is known because she was one of the earliest women to be a police officer, being a policewoman in 1903.

She was the aunt of philosopher and historian Hannah Arendt.

== Early life ==
Arendt was born in Königsberg in 1873. Her father, Max Arendt, was a Jewish merchant and son of Aron ben Joseph Arendt. Arendt was educated in her home town before she completed her studies in Geneva and Berlin. She could speak German, Russian, French and Italian fluently. She became a nurse.

== Law enforcement career ==
Arendt's entry into the police was unusual. She had approached a prison doctor to ask if there were vacancies for nurses in the prison hospital. He told her that there were none, and jokingly mentioned that the police were looking for an old woman to supervise arrested women in the cells.

Despite being only 28 years age, Arendt applied and was given the job. Negotiation was required to arrive at the job title of "Police Assistant". She is known because she was a policewoman in 1903 in Stuttgart, as well as the only policewoman in Europe.

In 1899 Arendt renounced Judaism and was baptized as an Evangelical Lutheran Christian.

Arendt was enthusiastic about her role; this caused conflict with her employers. She learned English and introduced herself as Europe's only policewoman. She had been hired to help with arrests of suspected prostitutes, but she gave talks and published essays on the problems she saw. Eventually, Arendt resigned under pressure from her superiors.

She subsequently moved to Switzerland where she worked in support of orphaned children and campaigned against the international trafficking of children. She reported on her work in particular in Erlebnisse einer Polizeiassistentin (1910).

Arendt died in Mainz in 1922.

== Bibliography ==
- Riepl-Schmidt, Mascha (15 February 2005). "Henriette Arendt". HannahArendt.net (in German). 1 (1). ISSN 1869-5787.
