= Vivian Arend =

Canadian author

- Occupation: Author
- Writing career
- Language: English
- Genres: Contemporary Romance, Romantic Suspense, Paranormal Romance
- Website: www.vivianarend.com

Vivian Arend (born March 2, 1965) is a Canadian author of contemporary romance, romantic suspense and paranormal romance novels. She has published books with Harlequin Enterprises, Berkley, Samhain Publishing, and Entangled. Arend has had multiple titles on the USA Today and New York Times bestseller lists. Her Six Pack Ranch series is set in Canada and has appeared on several e-book bestseller lists.

== Bibliography ==
=== Berkley Romantic Suspense ===
- High Risk (2013)
- High Passion (2013)
- High Seduction (2014)

=== Harlequin Carina Press ===
- Tangled Tinsel (2010)

=== Other publishers ===
- Tidal Wave (2009)
- Whirlpool (2010)
- Stormchild (2010)
- Falling, Freestyle (2010)
- The Wind & The Sun (2010)
- Faetful (2010)
- Peerless (2010)
- Fired Up (2010)
- Claiming Derryn (2010)
- Turn It On (2010)
- Turn It Up (2011)
- Stormy Seduction (2011)
- Silent Storm (2011)
- Rising, Freestyle (2011)
- Paradise Found (2011)
- All Fired Up (2014)
- Love is a Battlefield (2014)
- Don't Walk Away (2015)

=== Granite Lake Wolves series ===
- Wolf Signs (2009)
- Wolf Flight (2009)
- Wolf Games (2010)
- Wolf Tracks (2010)
- Wolf Line (2011)
- Wolf Nip (2012)

=== Takhini Wolves series ===
- Black Gold (2011)
- Silver Mine (2012)
- Diamond Dust (2013)
- Moon Shine (2014)

=== Takhini Shifters series ===
- Copper King (2014)
- Laird Wolf (2015)
- A Lady's Heart (2017)
- "Wild Prince" (2018)

=== Borealis Bears series ===
- The Bear's Chosen Mate (2019)
- The Bear's Fate Mate (2019)
- The Bear's Forever Mate (2020)

=== TimberWolf Lodge series ===
- The Alpha Option (2022)

=== Six Pack Ranch series ===
- Rocky Mountain Heat (2009)
- Rocky Mountain Haven (2010)
- Rocky Mountain Desire (2012)
- Rocky Mountain Angel (2012)
- Rocky Mountain Rebel (2013)
- Rocky Mountain Freedom (2013)
- Rocky Mountain Romance (2014)
- Rocky Mountain Retreat (2015)
- Rocky Mountain Shelter (2015)
- Rocky Mountain Devil (2016)
- Rocky Mountain Home (2017)
- Rocky Mountain Forever (2021)

=== Thompson & Sons series ===
- Ride Baby Ride (2014)
- Rocky Ride (2014)
- One Sexy Ride (2014)
- Let It Ride (2015)
- A Wild Ride (2016)

=== Heart Falls series ===
- A Rancher's Heart (2017)
- A Rancher's Song (2018)
- A Firefighter's Christmas Gift (2018)
- A Rancher's Bride (2018)
- The Cowgirl's Forever Love (2019)
- The Cowgirl's Secret Love (2020)
- The Cowgirl's Chosen Love (2020)
- A Soldier's Christmas Wish (2019)
- Three Weddings and a Baby (2020)
- A Hero's Christmas Hope (2020)
- A Rancher's Love (2021)
- A Cowboy's Christmas List (2021)
- A Rancher's Christmas Kiss (2022)
- Girls' Night Out (2022)
- Rose's One Night to Forever (2022)
- A Rancher's Vow (2023)

=== Collections ===
- Winter Wishes (2010)
- Snowed In With A Cowboy (2016)

== Awards and nominations ==
- 2017 - RWA Milestone Inductee 50 published novellas/novels
- 2015 - Romantic Times Reviewers Finalist Erotic Romance for "Marked" anthology with Lauren Dane and Kit Rocha
- 2014 - RITA Finalist - Paranormal Romance for Diamond Dust
- 2014 - RAINBOW Awards finalist for Rocky Mountain Freedom
- 2012 - Romantic Times Reviewers Finalist Paranormal/Fantasy for Silver Mine
- 2012 - RWA Honor Roll Inductee
- 2010 - EPPIE Western Erotic Romance Winner for Rocky Mountain Haven
