= Henri Arends =

Dutch conductor (1921–1994)

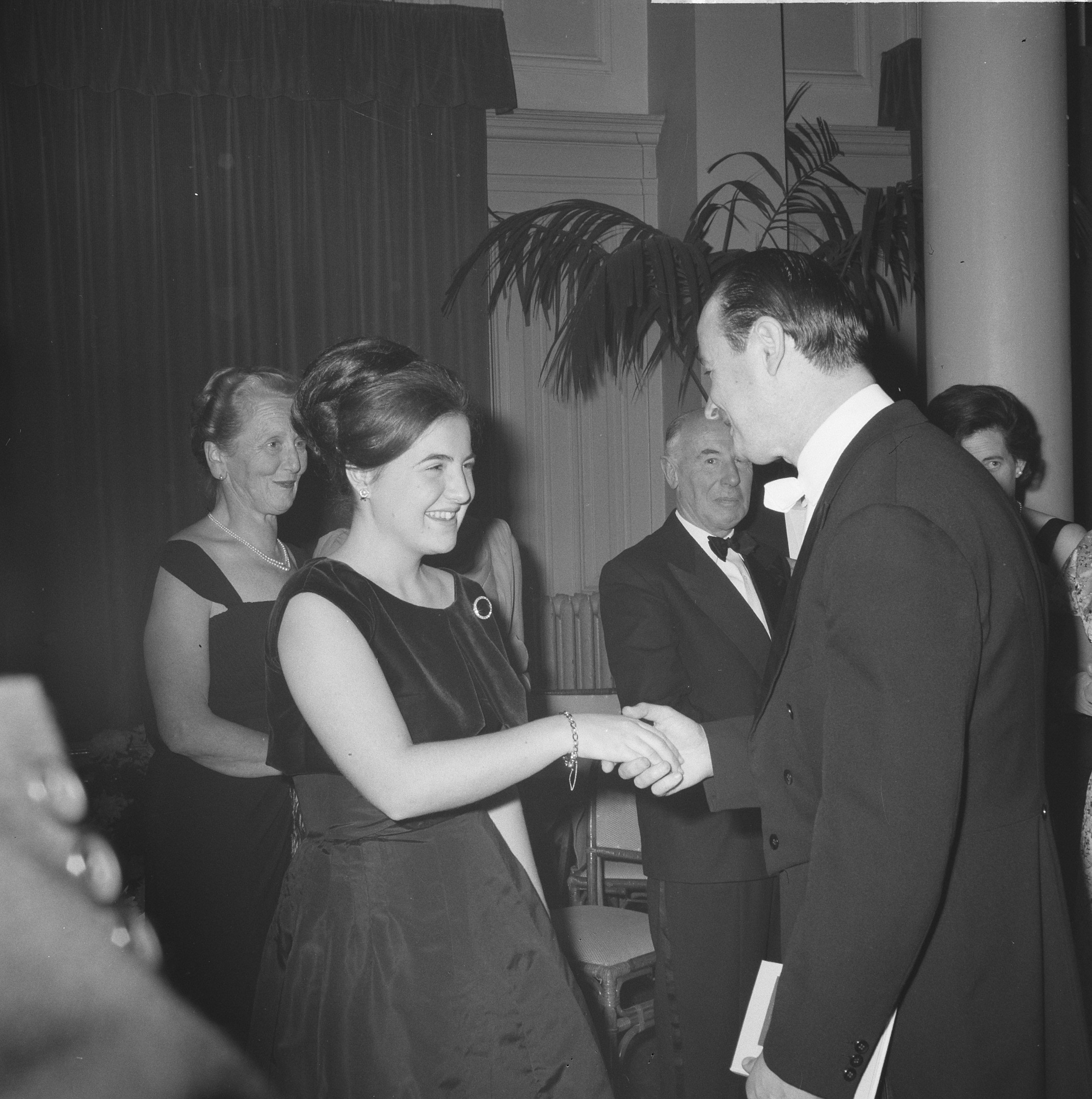
Arends greets princess Margriet

Henri Arends (8 May 1921 – 6 August 1994) was a Dutch conductor.

Arends was born in Maastricht, and belongs to the generation of conductors who paid as much attention to modern music as to that of the classic and romantic periods.

Originally a violinist, he attended the courses for conductors at the Mozarteum of Salzburg under Carlo Zecchi and at the Accademia Chigiana in Siena under Paul van Kempen.

Already in that time he was noticed for his mature interpretations and for his musical memory. Wilhelm Furtwängler, the great German conductor, who saw him working with the Mozarteum Orchestra Salzburg predicted a career for him.

From 1953 until 1957, he was assistant and later second conductor of the Royal Concertgebouw Orchestra, under first conductor Eduard van Beinum, in Amsterdam and choirmaster of the Toonkunst-choir.

It was as first conductor and musical director of the North Holland Philharmonic that he attracted attention for his approach to a vast repertoire and for his efforts to attract new audiences to the concert hall. Among these successful enterprises was the formation of the famous "Heart's Desires Festivals", which were aimed at young people.

As guest conductor, Arends performed at many concerts in his country and abroad.

He conducted a.o. the radio-orchestras of Hilversum, Paris, Helsinki, Nice and Geneva; the FOK-orchestra of Prag, the Philharmonics of Brno, Ostrawa, Kraków, Lodz, Katowice, Danzig, Budapest, Innsbruck, Osnabrück, Aachen and the Salzburg Mozarteum orchestra. He also appeared with orchestras in South-Africa (Cape Town and Johannesburg) and with orchestras in the United States (New York and Baton Rouge). He died in Lanaken.

== Publications ==
- Jozef Robijns, Miep Zijlstra: Algemene muziekencyclopedie, Haarlem: De Haan, (1979)-1984, ISBN 978-90-228-4930-9
- John L. Holmes: Conductors on record, London: Victor Gollancz, 1982. ISBN 978-0-313-22990-9
