= Carl Arendt =

German sinologist (1838–1902)

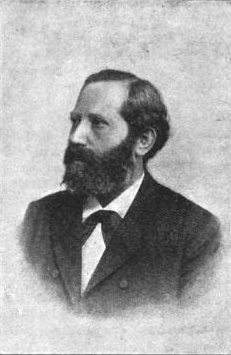
Carl Arendt

Carl Arendt (1838–1902) was a German sinologist and diplomat.

== Biography ==
Arendt was born on 1 December 1838 in Berlin, the son of a schoolmaster. He attended the Joachimsthal Gymnasium until 1952, and then studied linguistics at the then Friedrich Wilhelm University of Berlin (FWU Berlin) under Franz Bopp and Heymann Steinthal from 1856 to 1859.

In 1865, he trained as an interpreter in Beijing, and subsequently worked for the German foreign service in China for over twenty years: as the head of the consulate in Tianjin (1865–1867 and 1869–1873) and as an interpreter at the legation in Beijing (1868 and 1874–1887). Arendt was appointed professor of Chinese at FWU Berlin's Seminar for Oriental Languages from its foundation in October 1887.

Arendt died during the night of 29/30 January 1902 after a short illness. During a leave of absence from his diplomatic posting in China, he had married Eveline Noah, a distant relative. They had five children, one of whom was the philologist Fritz Arendt.

== Selected works ==
- Handbuch der nordchinesischen Umgangssprache, mit Einschluss der Angangsgründe des neuchinesischen Officiellen und Briefstils. Erster Theil. Allgemeine Einleitung in das chinesische Sprachstudium [Handbook of Northern Chinese Colloquial Language, including the fundamentals of Modern Chinese Official and Letter Style. Part One. General Introduction to the Study of the Chinese Language]. W. Spemann. 1891.
- Einführung in die nordchinesische Umgangssprache [Introduction to Northern Chinese colloquial speech]. W. Spemann. 1894.
