= Arndt Lake =

- Location within California
- Location: Yosemite National Park in Tuolumne County, California
- Coordinates: 38°04′33″N 119°30′15″W
- Type: lake
- Surface area: 5.60 ha (13.8 acres)
- Shore length^{1}: 1.14 km (0.71 mi)
- Surface elevation: 2,822 m (9,259 ft)
- ^{1} Shore length is not a well-defined measure.

Arndt Lake is a lake in Yosemite National Park, in California.

Arndt Lake was named for Alvin Arndt, of the U.S. Army.

== See also ==
- List of lakes in California
