= Arend von Stryk =

Namibian footballer (born 1970)

Arend von Stryk (born 10 February 1970) is a Namibian former footballer who played for SK Windhoek in the Namibia Premier League. He also played with the Namibia national football team. He played as a centre forward.
