= Chris Ahrens =

Chris Ahrens may refer to:

- Chris Ahrens (ice hockey) (born 1952), retired American ice hockey player
- Chris Ahrens (rower) (born 1976), American Olympic rower
- Chris Ahrens (born 1984), United States men's Paralympic soccer team defenseman
