= Karl Gamma =

Swiss alpine skier (1927–2021)

Personal information
- Nationality: Swiss
- Born: 19 September 1927; Andermatt, Switzerland
- Died: 5 January 2021 (aged 93); Andermatt, Switzerland

Sport
- Sport: Alpine skiing

Karl Gamma (19 September 1927 – 5 January 2021) was a Swiss alpine skier. He competed in the men's slalom at the 1948 Winter Olympics. He authored a ski handbook published in seven languages.
