= Willem van den Arend =

Dutch painter and engraver settled in France (1875–1954)

- Born: Willem van den Arend; February 19, 1875; Utrecht, Netherlands
- Died: March 11, 1954 (aged 79); Carantec, France
- Occupations: Painter; Woodcut engraver; Etcher
- Notable work: Vieilles Chapelles de Bretagne ("Old Chapels of Brittany"), 1928
- Parents: Pieter van den Arend (father); Cornelia de Laat (mother)

Willem van den Arend (born February 19, 1875 in Utrecht, Netherlands – died March 11, 1954 in Carantec, Finistère) was a Dutch painter, woodcut engraver and etcher. Having settled in France from the early 1910s, he established himself in Brittany, where he produced a body of work inspired by the landscapes of the Trégor region and by religious buildings. He notably collaborated with the writer Anatole Le Braz, for whose 1928 book Vieilles Chapelles de Bretagne he produced thirty-two original woodcuts.

== Early life and education ==
Willem van den Arend was born of the second marriage of Pieter van den Arend to Cornelia de Laat, into a family of well-off, prosperous merchants. His father, a trader established first in Rotterdam and then in Leicester, founded the Royal Dutch Cigar Company in 1863, and was involved in setting up some of the earliest tobacco-plantation enterprises in Java and the Sultanate of Deli (Note: The Sultanate of Deli, in northeastern Sumatra, was a major centre of Dutch colonial tobacco cultivation from the mid-19th century onward.). From the 1850s onward he also developed activities in maritime shipping and colonial trade.

He studied in the Netherlands, France, Italy and Spain, and travelled to several other countries during the course of his education.

== Personal life ==
On 21 September 1898, in The Hague, Willem van den Arend married Maria Louise Osmania Lohmann, a German woman from Wuppertal; the couple divorced on 1 October 1913 in Egmond-Binnen. Two sons were born of this marriage: Nicolaas Frederik Willem, born in Düsseldorf on 10 July 1899, died in Semarang (Java) on 10 June 1950; and Evert, born in Alkmaar on 1 September 1902. A daughter, Maria Louisa, was born in 1912 in Amsterdam. On 19 February 1915, in Amsterdam, he remarried, to the divorced opera singer Sophia Wilhelmina Jacoba Hermse, with whom he had a son, G. Willem, that same year.

== Career ==
=== Settling in France and artistic activity in Brittany ===
Woodcut from 1922 depicting the Breton traditional singer and storyteller Maryvonne Le Flem.

A notice published in January 1922 in the Revue moderne des arts et de la vie states that W. van den Arend had by then been living in France for "close to ten years," placing his move to the country in the early 1910s. Presented as an artist working in painting, wood engraving and etching alike, the article particularly highlights his activity as a portraitist.

In the early 1920s, his artistic output included several Breton subjects. He exhibited works based on Breton themes at the Salon d'Automne, among them a portrait of an "old Breton woman" and a landscape titled Pin de Bretagne ("Pine Tree of Brittany"). The critic of the Revue moderne des arts et de la vie described his art as characterised by frankness and sincerity, and emphasised his ability to move between different genres. Van den Arend is documented as being in Carantec in 1920, on the occasion of an art exhibition held in Morlaix as part of a regionalist congress. There he presented, among other works, oil portraits, landscapes, and a grisaille depicting Saint-Pol-de-Léon as seen from Carantec; he received an honourable mention for painting. The review published in Mouez ar Vro highlights his interest in Brittany and compares his treatment of the Carantec landscapes to the Flemish manner.

His engravings depict in particular the coastline, the landscapes of the Trégor, and several Breton religious buildings. The Rijksmuseum in Amsterdam holds several of his woodcuts, including two works entitled Bretonse kust ("Breton Coast"), Notre-Dame de Port-Blanc, and Landschap ("Landscape"), as well as a portrait of Anatole Le Braz (1922, edition of twelve), acquired by the museum in 1930. In 1922 van den Arend also produced an engraved portrait of Maryvonne Le Flem.

His integration into Breton regionalist circles is also attested by his correspondence with Francis Even, co-founder of the Union régionaliste bretonne in 1898. Thirty-three letters exchanged between the two men between 1925 and 1927 are held at the Centre de recherche bretonne et celtique. In Carantec he also associated with the painter Charles de Kergariou, known as "Kerga."

=== Collaboration with Anatole Le Braz ===
In 1928, Vieilles chapelles de Bretagne by Anatole Le Braz was published in Paris by Albert Morancé, illustrated with thirty-two original woodcuts by Willem van den Arend. The book is counted among the bibliophile productions pairing a writer with an artist tasked with graphically rendering his depiction of Breton chapels (Note: The French tradition of the "livre d'artiste" (artist's book) — pairing a literary text with original prints made specifically for a limited edition — has a loose Anglo-American counterpart in fine-press and private-press publishing, though the two traditions developed along distinct lines.). The engravings notably depict Sainte-Barbe du Faouët, Notre-Dame de Callot, Notre-Dame de Kermaria, Saint-Hervé du Menez-Bré, and Notre-Dame de Port-Blanc.

=== Critical reception ===
Willem van den Arend's work received a mixed reception from contemporary critics. In 1920, the review of the Morlaix exhibition praised the atmospheric treatment of his Breton landscapes. In 1922, the Revue moderne des arts et de la vie praised the frankness and sincerity of his art and his ease in moving between several genres. In 1928, however, the critic for L'Art et les Artistes acknowledged the quality of the book's presentation but judged van den Arend's woodcuts too naïve in expression given the quality of Le Braz's text.

== Later life (1930–1954) ==
Several of Willem van den Arend's engravings entered the collections of the Rijksmuseum in 1930. Living modestly, he received a monthly assistance allowance from the Royal Service for Assistance to Dutch Nationals in Need Abroad from the late 1930s onward. He continued his work as an engraver and painter in Carantec until his death on 11 March 1954.

== Works in public collections ==
Portrait of Anatole Le Braz, woodcut, 1922. Held at the Rijksmuseum.

- Amsterdam, Rijksmuseum:
  - Anatole Le Braz (1922)
  - Bretonse kust (two copies)
  - Landschap
  - Kinderkop ("Child's Head")
  - Notre-Dame de Port-Blanc
- Quimper, Musée départemental breton: print depicting Menez Bré and Saint-Michel de Brasparts, in the Monts d'Arrée.

== Illustrated books ==
- Le Braz, Anatole (1928). Vieilles Chapelles de Bretagne (PDF). Paris: Albert Morancé. OCLC 418493040. BnF 39109471k.
