= Arend, Iran =

Arend ارند
- Village
- Location within Iran
- Coordinates: 30°43′43″N 50°48′34″E
- Country: Iran
- Province: Kohgiluyeh and Boyer-Ahmad
- County: Charam
- Bakhsh: Central
- Rural District: Charam

Population (2006)
  - Total: 313
- Time zone: UTC+3:30 (IRST)
  - Summer (DST): UTC+4:30 (IRDT)

Arend (Persian: ارند, also Romanized as Ārend and Ārand) is a village in Charam Rural District, in the Central District of Charam County, Kohgiluyeh and Boyer-Ahmad Province, Iran. At the 2006 census, its population was 313, in 63 families.
