= Arent Greve de Besche =

Norwegian bacteriologist

Arent Greve de Besche (4 December 1878 – 16 September 1945) was a Norwegian bacteriologist.

He was born in Kristiania as a son of Oscar de Besche (1846–1909) and Anna Sophie Løberg. His father owned the newspaper Morgenbladet, so did his grandfather Johan Gerhard de Besche. The family had migrated to Sweden from the Netherlands in the 16th century, and one branch from there to Norway in the 17th century.

He finished his secondary education in 1896, and graduated with the cand.med. degree in 1904. He worked as a hospital assistant from 1906 to 1912, except for half a year in 1908 when he studied in Berlin (under Georg Theodor August Gaffky and August von Wasserman) and Belitz. In 1912 he was appointed as an associate professor at Rikshospitalet, and the next year he took the dr.med. degree on the thesis Bakteriologiske studier over barnetuberkulose. He later published mostly in German and US journals. In 1920 he became lecturer of medicinal bacteriology at the university.

In June 1914 in Bærum he married Anita Iversen, born in Spain to a consul. He died in 1945.
