= Arend Fokke Simonsz =

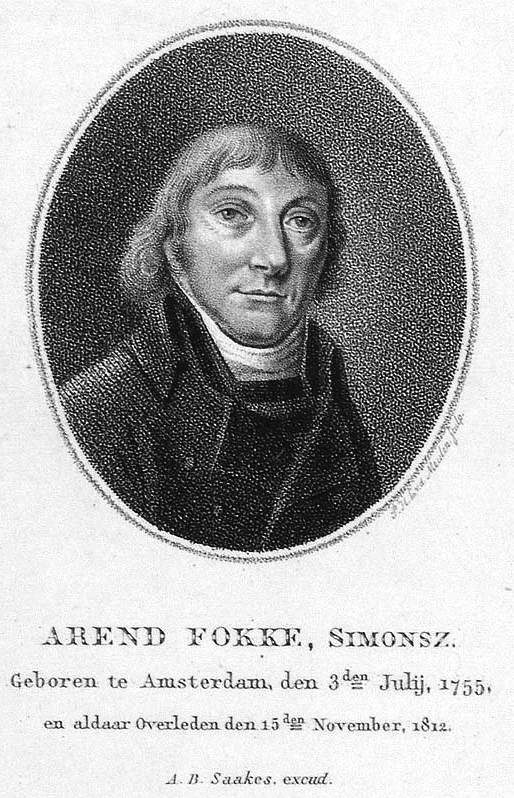
- Born: 3 July 1755; Amsterdam, Netherlands
- Died: 15 November 1812 (aged 57); Amsterdam, Netherlands
- Occupation: Writer

Arend Fokke Simonsz (3 July 1755 – 15 November 1812) was a Dutch writer and intellectual.

== Biography ==
Arend Fokke Simonsz was born to Simon and Cornelia Fokke. Simonsz is best remembered as a writer, but was also an important figure in the literary world at the end of the eighteenth century. He had for some time a publishing house and was a member of many literary societies. One of his most famous works, Het toekomende jaar 3000, is one of the earliest written examples of a utopia, and probably one of the first in Dutch literature. Many of his books where critical analyses of current events and trends. He had established himself as a critical observer, especially of the French government at the time. Though not illegal, this critical view brought him into the close eye of the authorities.

He died at the age of 57 in Amsterdam.

== Bibliography ==
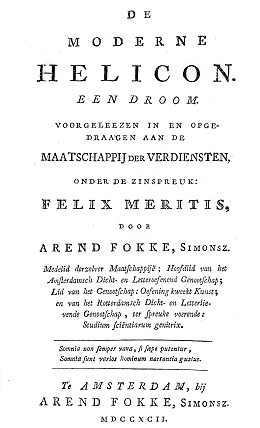
Title page of Arend Fokker Simonsz. De moderne Helicon. Een droom, Amsterdam, 1792.

- Dichtlievende mengelingen (1783)
- Fokke, Arend (1792). De moderne Helicon, een droom [The Modern Helicon. A Dream.] (in Dutch). Amsterdam: A. Fokke. OCLC 458076954. 72 pages. Full-text online at Digital Library for Dutch Literature.
- Het toekomende jaar 3000 (1792)
- Cathechismus der Weetenschappen, schoone Kunsten en fraaije Letteren (1794–1802)
- Proeve van een ironiesch-comiesch woordenboek (1797)
- Het onscheidbaar drietal redenwezens verlichting, deugd en tijd (1799)
- Dorus of het wonderwind (1808)
- Boertige reis door Europa (1794–1806)
