= Joseph Arndt =

American musician

American organist Joseph Arndt is Organist and Director of Music at The Church of St. Michael & St. George in St. Louis, Missouri. He was previously Music Director at Saint John's Episcopal Church in Tulsa, Oklahoma. He has taught harpsichord and early music at the University of Central Oklahoma and Oklahoma City University. In Tulsa, he led the campaign for a new chancel organ, Opus 173 by Schoenstein & Co. He founded the Oklahoma Bach Choir and conducted a Leipzig 300 series commemorating the 300th anniversary of Johann Sebastian Bach's appointment as Thomaskantor. The series included a lecture by author and Bach scholar Christoph Wolff.

Prior to his move to Tulsa he was the Director of Music at Grace Church, Newark, NJ, one of the prominent Anglo-Catholic parishes in the eastern United States. He also was an assisting organist at Trinity Wall Street. He played continuo for Bach Vespers at Holy Trinity in New York for six years. He took his first church organist position at the age of 12 at St. Peter's-at-the-Light Episcopal Church in Barnegat Light, NJ. Prior to Grace Church, he held positions at St. Peter's Episcopal Church in Morristown, NJ, Christ Church, United Methodist in New York City, and Lamington Presbyterian Church in Bedminster, NJ.

Arndt is the recipient of numerous honors, including First Place awards at the West Chester University and Joan Lippincott Organ Competitions. He received a Bachelor of Music degree from Westminster Choir College and a Master of Music from The Juilliard School. He was an Irene Diamond Graduate Fellowship recipient at The Juilliard School. Arndt's teachers include Paul Jacobs, Ken Cowan, and Diane Meredith Belcher.

Mr. Arndt has a significant interest in new music. Composers including Jonathan Dawe, Christian Carey, and Conrad Cummings have dedicated new organ works to him. He recorded Jonathan Dawe's work "Zipoli Automata" for the album "Piercing are the Darts." In 2023 he commissioned Paean by Rebecca Groom te Velde, a work now published by Oxford University Press.

He has performed organ recitals throughout the eastern United States, in addition to performances in England (including at the Clare College Chapel).
