= Thomas Åhrén =

Sámi-Norwegian politician

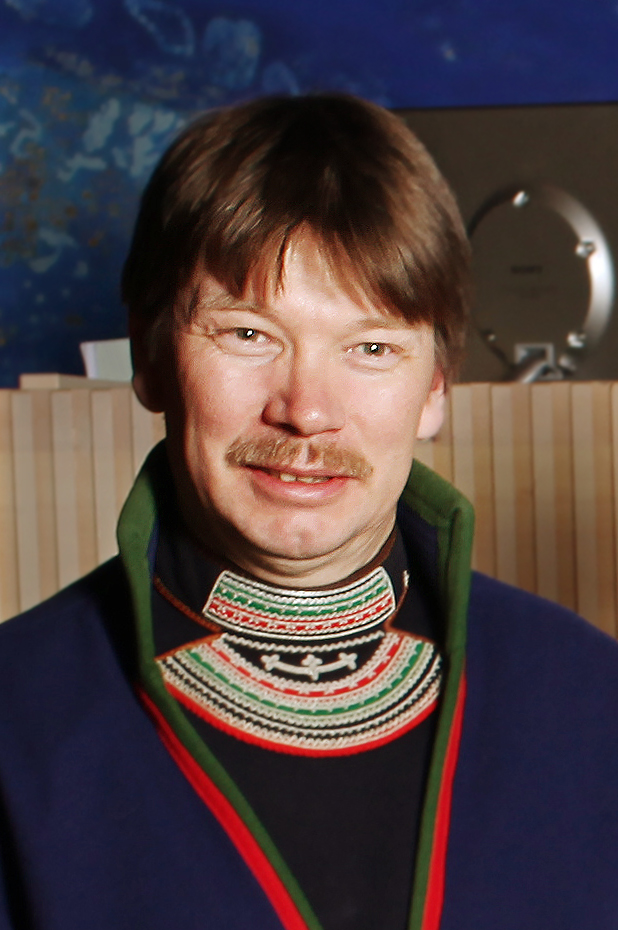

Personal details
- Born: 4 February 1965 (age 61) Strömsund, Sweden
- Party: Norwegian Sámi Association

Bjørn Thomas Åhrén (born 4 February 1966 in Strömsund, Sweden) is a Sámi-Norwegian politician. He was a member of the Sámi Parliament of Norway from 2013 to 2017 and is currently a representative of the south Sámi constituency and will remain in this role until 2021.

Åhrén is a representative in the Norwegian Sámi Association and was a member of the Sámi Parliamentary council from 2013 to 2016. While he sat on the Sámi council, Nora Marie Bransfjell took his place in parliament as a deputy. Åhrén currently works as Technical Manager in Namdalseid Municipality.

Thomas Åhrén has a doctorate of engineering Luleå University of Technology.
