= Arendt–Seymour House =

Historic house in Ohio, United States

- U.S. National Register of Historic Places
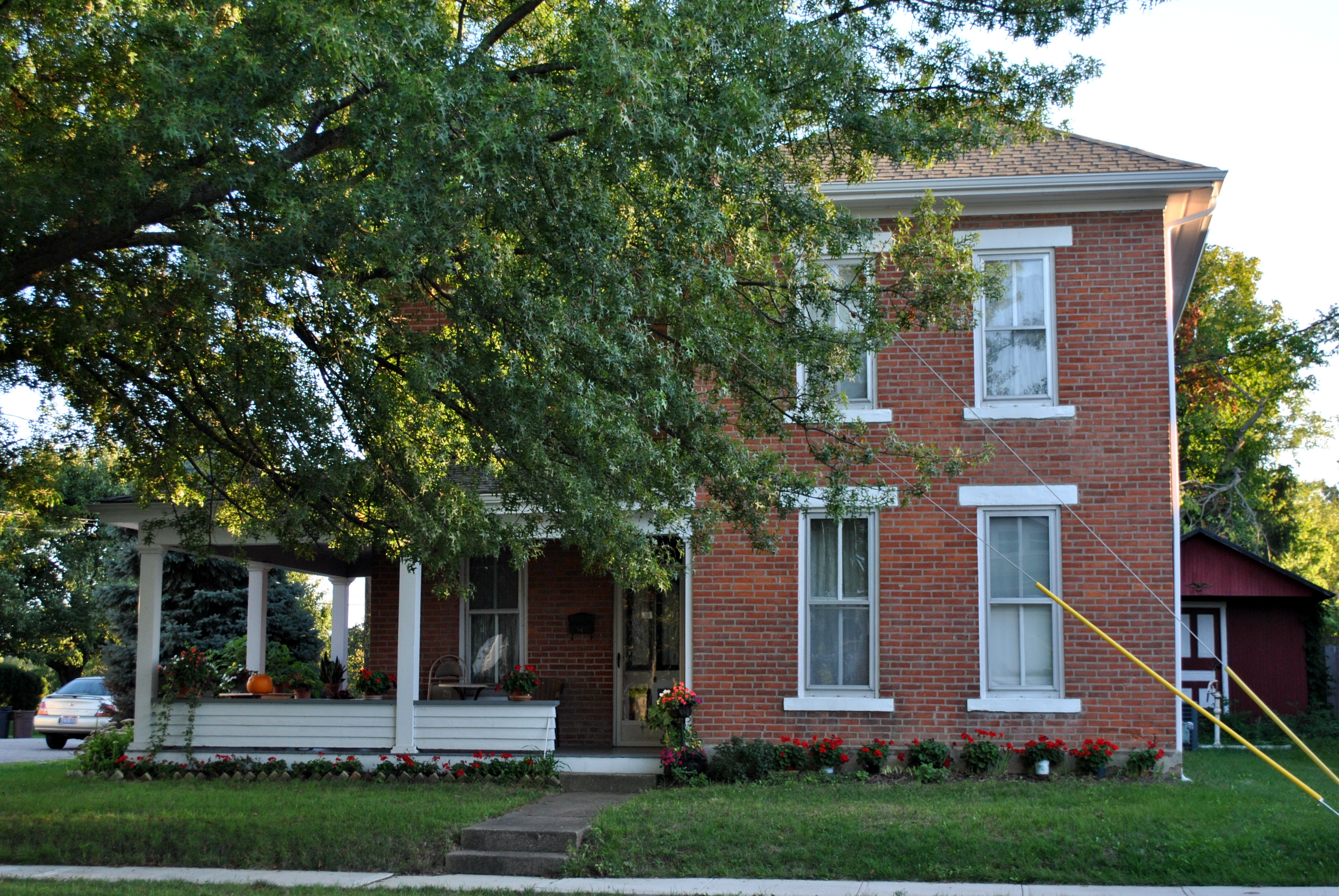

- Location within Ohio Location within the United States
- Interactive map showing the location of Arendt-Seymour House
- Location: 53 W. Columbus St., Canal Winchester, Ohio
- Coordinates: 39°50′29.49″N 82°48′28.01″W
- MPS: Canal Winchester MPS
- NRHP reference No.: 89001024
- Added to NRHP: 1989-08-15

Arendt–Seymour House is a historic building in Canal Winchester, Ohio. It was listed in the National Register of Historic Places in 1989. It is considered an example of Railroad Era architecture and features Italianate details. It is currently a private residence.
