= Arend van der Wel =

Dutch footballer (1933–2013)

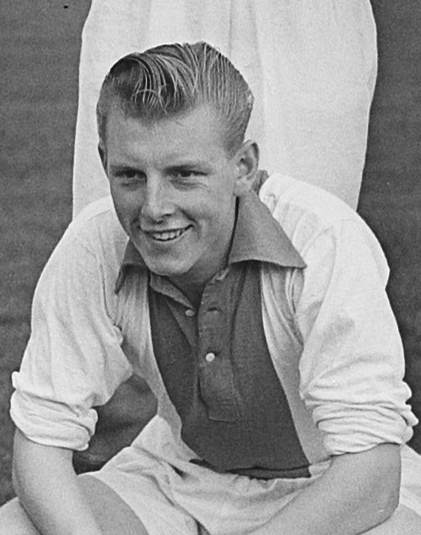
- Arend van der Wel, September 1951

Personal information
- Full name: Arend Karl van der Wel
- Date of birth: 28 March 1933
- Place of birth: Amsterdam, Netherlands
- Date of death: 16 September 2013 (aged 80)
- Place of death: Denekamp, Netherlands
- Position: Forward

Youth career
- De Volewijckers
- Ajax

Senior career*
Years	Team	Apps	(Gls)
1950–1955	Ajax	93	(43)
1955–1964	SC Enschede	220	(57)
1964–1965	SC Cambuur	28	(11)
1965–1967	HVV Tubantia		
1967–1969	DOS '19 (Denekamp)		
- * Club domestic league appearances and goals

Arend van der Wel (28 March 1933 – 16 September 2013) was a Dutch professional footballer who played for Ajax and SC Enschede; he also worked as a scout and a coach at FC Twente. He also worked with amateur club DOS '19 and the Royal Dutch Football Association, and for his work in football he was made a Knight of the Order of Orange-Nassau.
