= Mary A. Ahrens =

American lawyer

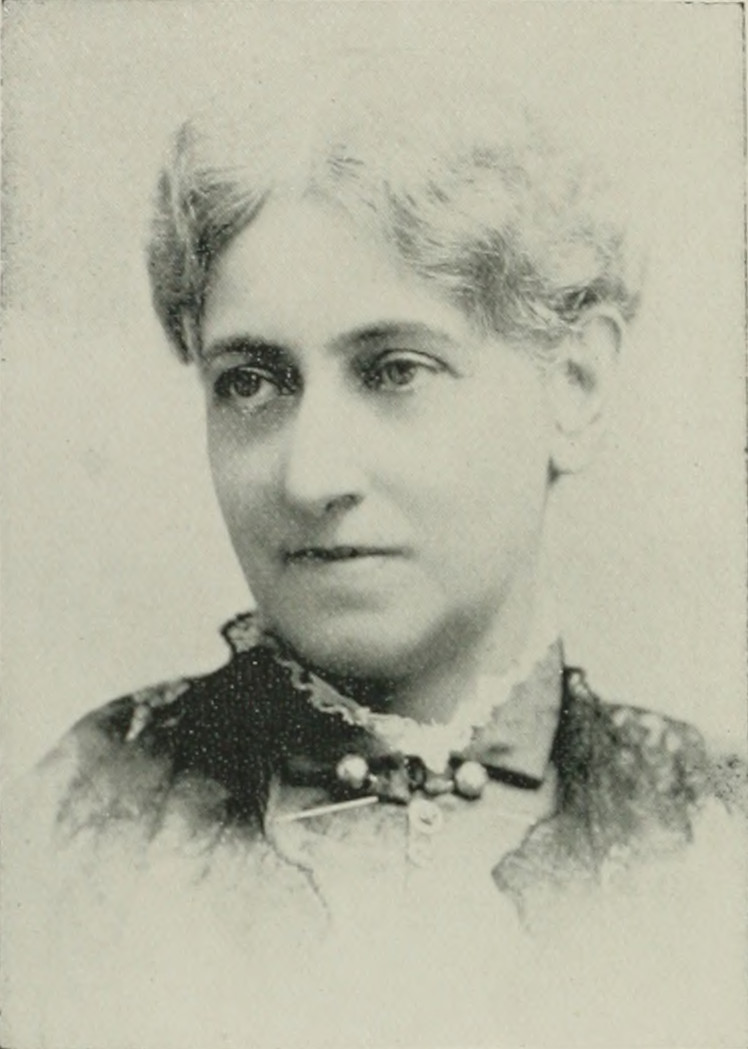
- Born: Mary Ann Jones; December 29, 1836; Alrewas, Staffordshire, England
- Died: February 17, 1921 (aged 84)
- Education: Union College of Law
- Occupations: Teacher, Lawyer
- Spouses: Philip Fellows (m. 1857) Louis Ahrens (m. 1886)

Mary Ann Ahrens (née Jones; December 29, 1836 – 17 February 1921) was an English-American teacher, lawyer, and social reformer.

== Family and education ==
Born in Alrewas, Staffordshire, England, Ahrens was the daughter of William H. Jones, a Methodist clergyman, and Ann (Brown) Jones. When she was fifteen, the family moved to America and settled in Southern Illinois.

She was married twice. In 1857 she married Philip Fellows, with whom she had two sons and a daughter. After raising her children, Ahrens taught newly emancipated black Americans. In 1886, she married Louis Ahrens, a lawyer and artist.

== Career ==
Not long into her second marriage, Ahrens decided to study law. She enrolled in the Chicago Union College of Law, graduating with honors in 1889. Her primary clients were women and children and the poor. She gained national prominence as part of a growing cadre of women lawyers. When the federal court of appeals was established in 1891, Ahrens was the only woman in the first class of 33 lawyers to be admitted to practice before the Seventh Circuit Court of Appeals. One newspaper described her as a "shining light" in Chicago who "possesses unquestioned legal learning and ability eloquence and a distinguished manner." Burnishing her reputation, she contracted a life-threatening case of pneumonia after braving a snow storm to timely file court documents, and her recovery was watched and reported in the press.

Ahrens was a dedicated advocate for women's suffrage, pursuing this goal through lectures, lawsuits, and civic engagement. She served as chair of the Woman's School Suffrage Association of Cook County She is credited with helping to open school elections to Illinois women. On June 19, 1891, the General Assembly gave women the power to vote in school elections, this seen as a strategic first step towards full suffrage. However, just before the November election, the Chicago Board of Election Commissioners ruled that the law did not apply to any office listed in the state's constitution. Ahrens sued for the right to cast a ballot for the Cook County superintendent of schools. The Illinois Supreme Court ruled against her, finding that the state legislature lacked the authority to enfranchise women when the state's constitution limited voters to male citizens over the age of 21 or those who could vote prior to statehood in 1848. In another case, the Illinois Supreme Court clarified that women could vote in school elections where the office was not in the state constitution, such as a city board. In the next election cycle Ahrens ran for University Trustee in 1894, but was defeated by Lucy Flower for the honor of being the first Illinois woman to hold statewide office. Ahrens continued to advocate for women touring with a lecture entitled "Women's Disability Before the Law" based on a paper prepared for the Illinois Women's Press Association in 1892. The publication discussed the common law concept of coverture in lay terms, explaining a husband's lawful authority to sell any of his wife's possessions, remove children from her care or restrain her movement to the home. She concluded for her audiences that only legislation would provide legal protections to women.

In addition to the law and suffrage, Ahrens was active in social services. In 1890, she became the founding president of the Chicago Immediate Aid Society, which opened a relief station offering meals and lodging to homeless men as well as helping them find work. Recognizing a similar need among women, in early 1894 she founded the Mary A. Ahrens Mission, a home for destitute women in Chicago at 48 Peck Court. The mission house moved to 1324 Indiana, an area called "The Patch", after an Easter donation by F.H. Cooper on land owned by the Garret Biblical Institute. She was vice-president of the Protective Agency for Women and Children, and vice-president of the Illinois Women's Press Association.

She died in Chicago in 1921, aged 84.

== See also ==
  - List of first women lawyers and judges in Illinois
