= Arnd Meißl =

Austrian politician (born 1968)

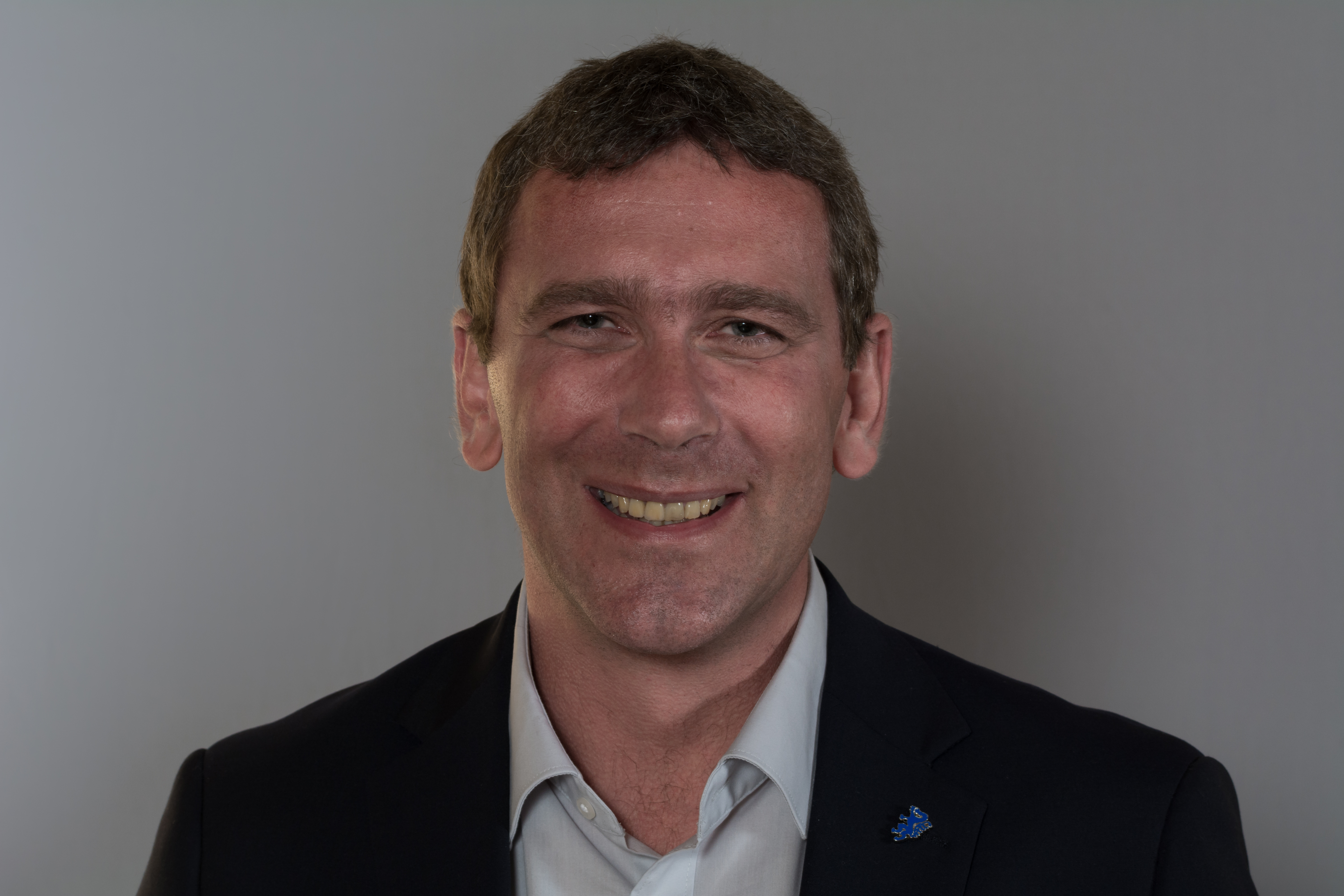

Member of the Federal Council
- In office 16 June 2015 – 18 December 2017

Personal details
- Born: 30 March 1968 (age 58)
- Party: Freedom Party of Austria

Arnd Meißl (born 30 March 1968) is an Austrian politician who has been a Member of the Federal Council for the Freedom Party of Austria (FPÖ) from 2015 until 2017. From 2017 to 2019 he was a member of the Landtag Steiermark.
