= Thomas J. Ahrens =

American geophysicist (1936–2010)

- Born: Thomas Julian Ahrens; April 25, 1936; Frankfurt, Germany
- Died: November 24, 2010 (aged 74); Pasadena, California
- Education: MIT, Caltech, Rensselaer
- Known for: Studies of terrestrial planets, impact processes on planetary surfaces
- Awards: Newcomb Cleveland Prize, Harry H. Hess Award
- Scientific career
- Fields: Geophysics
- Workplaces: Caltech
- Doctoral students: Rex Gibbons, Raymond Jeanloz

Thomas Julian Ahrens (April 25, 1936 – November 24, 2010) was an American geophysicist and professor at the Caltech. His research focused on the study of terrestrial planets and the impact processes on their surfaces. Through his contributions to research on topics including dynamic loading, structural changes to molten silicates, and shock wave temperature measurement methods, his work contributed to understanding of the origin and evolution of Mars, the Moon, Jupiter, Venus, and Earth.

== Education and career ==
Ahrens completed his B.S. at the Massachusetts Institute of Technology in 1957, his M.S. at Caltech in 1958, and his Ph.D. at Rensselaer Polytechnic Institute in 1962. He credits MIT's Patrick Hurley for his emerging interest in the questions of the evolution of the Earth and planets.

From 1958 to 1959, Ahrens worked as a geophysicist for the Pan American Petroleum Corporation. He served as a Second Lieutenant in the U.S. Army at the Ballistics Research Laboratory from 1959 to 1960. Ahrens then led the Geophysics Section at the Poulter Laboratory, Stanford Research Institute, from 1962 to 1967.

Ahrens joined Caltech as an Associate Professor of Geophysics in 1967, became a full Professor in 1976, and held the W. M. Keck Foundation Professor of Earth Sciences position from 1996 to 2001. He was named the Jones Professor from 2004 to 2005 and became a Jones Professor Emeritus from 2005 until his death in 2010.

== Accolades ==
Ahrens received several honors throughout his career, including the AAAS Newcomb Cleveland Prize in 1984 and election to the National Academy of Sciences in 1992. On December 17, 1996, he was awarded the Harry H. Hess Award at the AGU Fall Meeting Honor Ceremony. The iron-rich endmember of the γ-olivine solid solution series, γ-Fe_{2}SiO_{4}, was named "ahrensite" in his honor in 2013.

== See also ==
- List of geophysicists
