= Aron Gustaf Silfversparre =

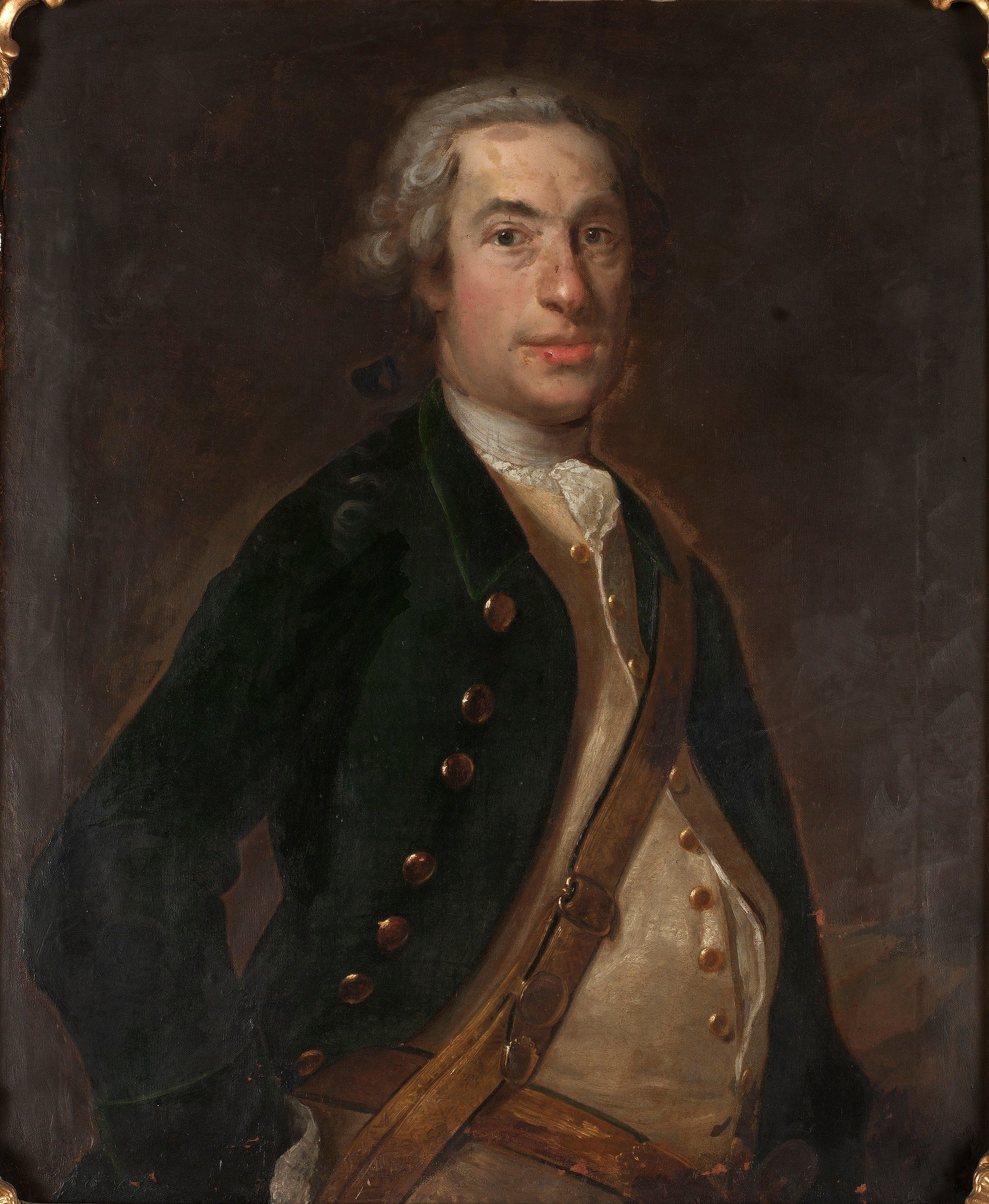
Aron Gustaf Silfversparre

Aron Gustaf Silfversparre (often wrote himself as Arent Gustaf Silfversparre), (25 January 1727 – 21 April 1818) was a Swedish baron, chamberlain and knight of the Order of the Polar Star and also a member of the Royal Swedish Academy of Music.

Silfversparre was the son of judge Carl Gustaf Silfversparre and Hedvig Ulrica Lilliecreutz. After his studies at Uppsala University he became an intern in the Svea Court of Appeal, and secretary at the Administrative Court of Appeals in 1748. In 1751, he became a courtier at the King Adolf Fredriks inner circles. Silfversparre was also an amateur musician and member of the Utile Dulci and one of the Kungliga Musikaliska Akademien creators which it was created on 7 December 1771 and have number 3 on its matrikel. In 1815, he became knighted into the Order of the Polar Star. Silfversparre was married to Gundborg Charlotta Ehrencreutz.
