= Tom Ahrens =

American nurse, researcher, and educator

Thomas Ahrens is an American nurse, researcher, and educator at Barnes-Jewish Hospital specializing in critical-care nursing.

== Education ==
Ahrens graduated from Indiana University – Purdue University Indianapolis with a PhD in physiology and nursing in 1987.

== Professional and scholarly work ==
Ahrens has more than 25 years of experience as a critical care nurse, and is the author of five books, more than 100 papers, and more than 40 scientific publications. His book Essentials of Oxygenation received the Book of the Year Award from the American Journal of Nursing. Ahrens is also a grant reviewer for the National Institutes of Health and formerly served on the board of directors for AACN. He is a recognized authority in sepsis and has given numerous lectures around the country on the subject.

Ahrens is a Fellow of the American Academy of Nursing, which named him one of its first Edge Runners in 2006; the award recognizes innovations resulting in better care for patients, families, and the community.

In 2008, he received the Flame of Excellence award from the American Association of Critical-Care Nurses; this award recognizes sustained contributions of excellence in acute and critical care nursing.

== Business ==
Ahrens co-founded the company ICU-USA, Inc. in 1999. The company operates a website which provides educational information to hospital staff and medical information to patients and families (particularly those in intensive care units). The company also places computer kiosks in public areas for use by patients, families, and hospital staff in accessing the site. The website has been endorsed by the American Association of Critical Care Nurses and has been named "The Official Patient and Family Website of the Society of Critical Care Medicine" by the Society of Critical Care Medicine.

== Personal life ==
Ahrens and his wife Pat Ahrens have four children.
