= Leopold Arends =

German stenographer and inventor

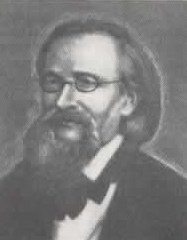
Leopold Arends

Leopold Alexander Friedrich Arends (4 December 1817 in Rukiškis, Vilna Governorate (now Anykščiai district of Lithuania) – 22 December 1882, Berlin) was a German stenographer and inventor of a system of stenography extensively used on the Continent, especially in Sweden.

== Bibliography ==
- Leopold Arends, "Das Wunderreich der Natur" (1858)
- Leopold Arends, "Vollständiger Leitfaden" (ed. 20, 1891)
- Rätzsch, "Das System Arends" (1884)
