= Ahrens (disambiguation) =

Ahrens is a surname.

Ahrens may also refer to:

- USS Ahrens, a Buckley-class destroyer escort
- Ahrens (manufacturer), former aircraft manufacturer
