= Angela Ahrendts =

American-British businesswoman (born 1960)

Dame Angela Ahrendts DBE
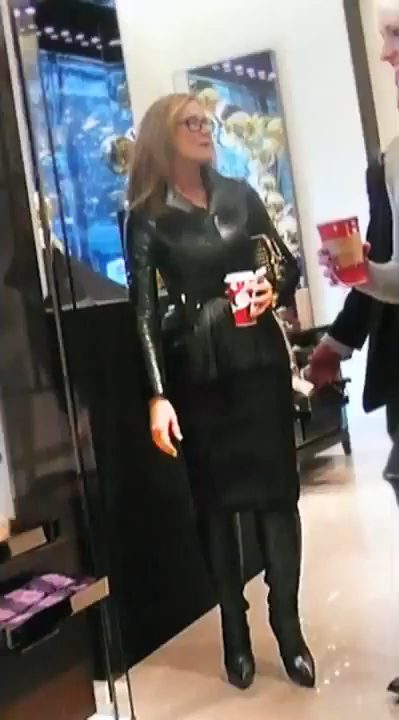
- Ahrendts in 2012
- Born: Angela Jean Ahrendts; June 7, 1960 (age 65); New Palestine, Indiana, US
- Other name: Angela Ahrendts-Couch
- Citizenship: United States; United Kingdom
- Education: Ball State University
- Occupations: Senior Vice President, Retail, Apple Inc. (2014–2019); CEO of Burberry (2006–2014)
- Spouse: Gregg Couch
- Children: 3

Dame Angela Jean Ahrendts DBE (born 7 June 1960) is an American-British businesswoman who was previously the senior vice president of retail at Apple Inc. She was the CEO of Burberry from 2006 to 2014. She left Burberry to join Apple in 2014. She was ranked 25th in Forbes' 2015 list of the most powerful women in the world, 9th most powerful woman in the U.K. in the BBC Radio 4 Woman's Hour 100 Power List, and 29th in Fortune's 2014 list of the world's most powerful women in business. She was also a member of the UK's prime minister's business advisory council until it was disbanded in 2016.

== Early life ==
Ahrendts was born and raised in New Palestine, Indiana, the third of six children. Her father, Richard Ahrendts, was a businessman, and her mother, Jean, was a homemaker.

She attended New Palestine High School, where she was a varsity cheerleader. In 1981, she earned an undergraduate degree in Merchandising and Marketing from Ball State University in Muncie, Indiana.

== Career ==
Ahrendts moved to New York City to work in the fashion industry. After a series of positions including merchandising at bra maker Warnaco, she joined Donna Karan International in 1989, working to develop the luxury brand internationally through both wholesale and licensing. In 1996, she was hired at Henri Bendel by Leslie Wexner to expand Bendel stores to 50 new markets, but the project was cancelled by the board of directors two years later.

In 1998, she joined Fifth & Pacific Companies as vice president of corporate merchandising and design. In 2001, she was promoted to senior vice president of corporate merchandising and group president, responsible for the merchandising of the group's 20 plus brands including Laundry by Shelli Segal, Lucky Brand Dungarees and the men's retail business of Liz Claiborne Inc. In 2002, she was promoted again to serve as executive vice president, with full responsibility for the complete line of Liz Claiborne products, services and development across both women's and men's lines.

=== Burberry ===
Ahrendts joined Burberry in January 2006, and took up the position of CEO on July 1, 2006, replacing Rose Marie Bravo. She mitigated the brand's decline in prestige by immediately limiting the number of clothing and accessories carrying the Burberry check pattern to 10%, minimizing the damage ubiquitous counterfeits had caused to sales. She also oversaw the buying back of the brand's fragrance and beauty product licenses and the buying out of the Spanish franchise which was then generating 20% of group revenues to stop its unfettered licensing. She stated that she did not model her approach after any other fashion house, but looked to world-class design as an influence, including Apple Inc. The company value rose during her tenure from £2 billion to over £7 billion. CNN Money reported that during 2012, she was the highest-paid CEO in the U.K., making $26.3 million.

=== Apple ===
On 15 October 2013, it was announced that Ahrendts would leave Burberry in Spring 2014 to join Apple Inc. as a member of its executive team as senior vice president of retail and online stores, filling the spot vacated by John Browett in October 2012. On 1 May 2014, she was placed on the Apple Leadership roster.

According to Apple's 2015 proxy statement filed with the Securities and Exchange Commission, Ahrendts earned over $70 million in 2014, more than any other executive at Apple, including CEO Tim Cook. As of August 2016, she is reported to own approximately US$11 million worth of Apple shares.

On 5 February 2019, Apple announced that she would leave the company in April to be replaced by Deirdre O'Brien.

=== Board memberships ===
Ahrendts is a non-executive board member of Save the Children, Ralph Lauren Corporation, Airbnb and Charity: Water. As of 1 July 2020, she is also a non-executive member of the board of WPP plc.

== Awards and memberships ==
- 2000: Crain's New York "Rising Stars 40 under 40"
- 2010: Awarded honorary doctorate of Humane Letters from Ball State.
- 2010–present: Prime Minister's Business Advisory Group, Member
- 2010: CNBC European Business Leader of the Future
- 2010: Oracle World Retail Awards, Outstanding Leadership Award
- 2011: St George's Society of New York, Medal of Honor
- 2011 (also 2010): Financial Times Top 50 Women in World Business
- 2011: Shenkar College of Engineering and Design, Honorary Fellow
- 2013: Business of Fashion BoF 500
- 2013: The Most Excellent Order of the British Empire, a DBE for services to British business. Made substantive in 2023.
- 2013 (also 2010, 2011): Fortune's Businesspeople of the Year (2010, 2011, 2013)
- 2013: Ranked #4 in Fortune's 2013 top people in business
- 2013: Financial Times Women of 2013
- 2013 (also 2006, 2007, 2009, 2010, 2011, 2012): Forbes' 100 Most Powerful Women in the World
- 2013: 9th most powerful woman in the United Kingdom by Woman's Hour on BBC Radio 4
- 2014: Fast Company Most Creative People in Business
- 2014 (also 2007, 2008, 2011, 2012, 2013): Fortune's 50 Most Powerful Women in Business

== Personal life ==
Ahrendts met her husband, Gregg Couch, while they were in elementary school, and they were high school sweethearts. The couple has three children. When she was working at Burberry, the family lived in a 12,000 square feet (1,100 m^{2}) home on an 8 acres (3.2 ha) plot west of London. Brought up a Methodist, she is still an active Christian.

== See also ==
- Outline of Apple Inc. (personnel)
- History of Apple Inc.
- Apple Store
