= Arnold (given name) =

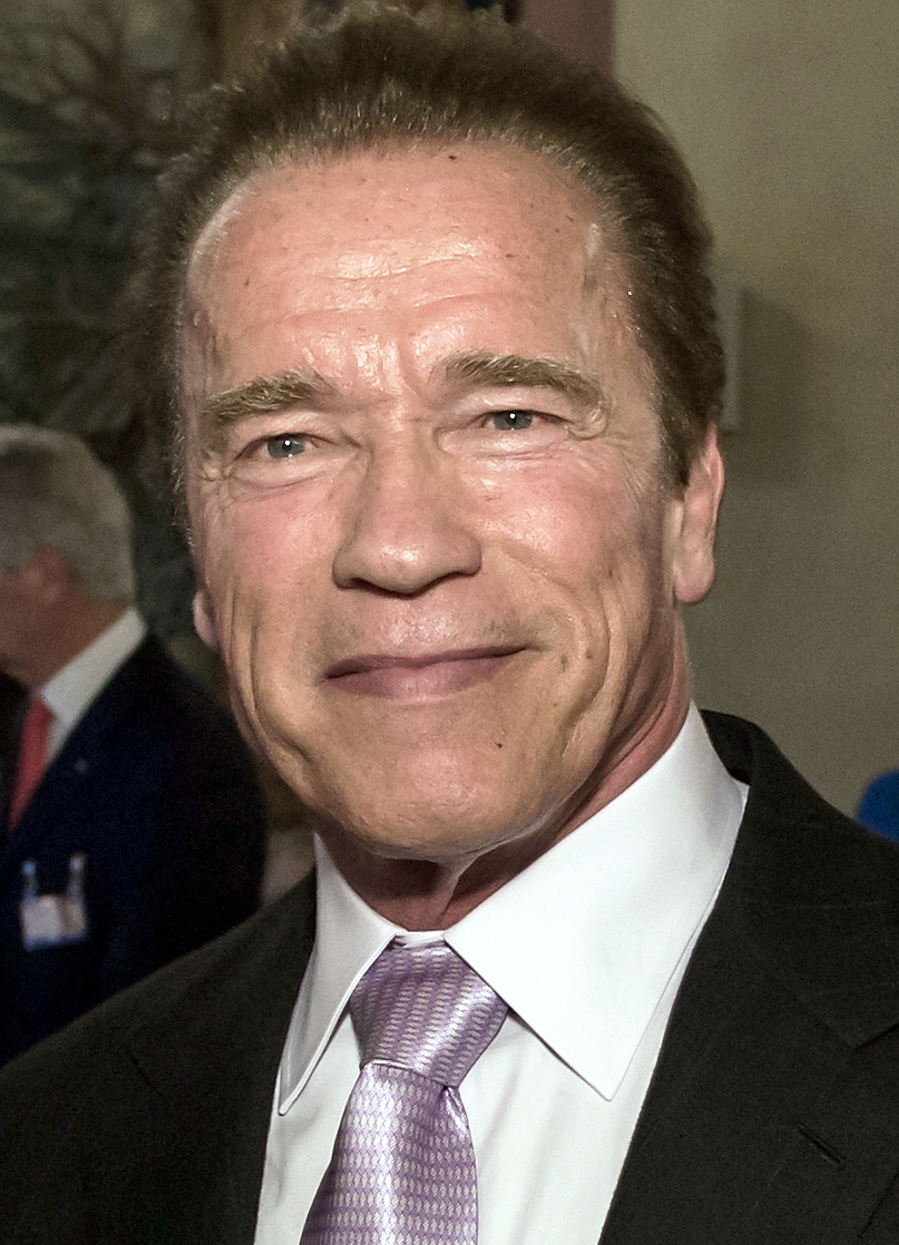
- Arnold Schwarzenegger is a famous person with this name.
- Pronunciation: English: /ˈɑːrnəld/ German: [ˈaʁnɔlt] Finnish: [ˈɑrnold]
- Gender: Male
- Language: Old High German Old Frankish
- Name day: 1 October

Origin
- Origin: Germanic
- Meaning: eagle power, bright eagle
- Region of origin: Western Europe

Other names
- Variant forms: Arndt, Aart, Arent, Ahrend, Arnaud, Arne, Aarne, Arnout, Arnoud, Arno, Arnaldo, Arnoldo, Arnolds
- Nickname: Arnie
- Derived: Arnold (surname), Ahrens, Arnall, Arnell, Arnaud (surname)
- Related names: Arnulf, Annakin

Arnold is a masculine Germanic (including German, Dutch and English) dithematic given name composed of the Germanic stems arn "eagle" and wald "power".

== History ==
The name was first recorded in Francia from about the 7th century, at first often conflated with the name Arnulf, as in the name of bishop Arnulf of Metz, also recorded as Arnoald. Arnulf appears to be the older name (with cognates in Old English/Anglo-Saxon and Old Norse), and German (Frankish) Arnold may have originally arisen in c. the 7th century as a corruption of Arnulf, possibly by conflation of similar names such as Hari-wald, Arn-hald, etc.

The name is attested with some frequency in Medieval Germany during the 8th to 11th centuries, as Arnold, Arnalt, Arnald, Arnolt. It was occasionally spelled Harnold, Harnald, and the name may have been conflated with an independent formation containing hari- "host, army". Its etymology ceased to be evident from an early time, and it was sometimes folk-etymologized as Ehrenhold in the early modern period. The French form Arnaud is recorded from the 10th century, and may have reinforced and been reinforced by cognates in England after the Norman conquest, such as the Anglo-Saxon form Earnweald (Domesday Book Ernehale; Ernaldus 12th century). However, the Norman spelling did not survive into the modern period (other than a possible survival in surnames such as Arnall, Arnell, although these names could be of multiple origins, most likely the Old English), and once standardised spelling swept England, the form Arnold gradually became the norm. In most of the English speaking world, the name regained popularity in the 18th and 19th centuries. In the United States, Arnold had a relative surge of popularity at the beginning of the 20th century, peaking as the 89th most commonly given masculine name in 1916, but it dropped again below rank 200 by the 1950s.

== Hypocorisms and variants ==
Hypocorisms of the name are: Arent (Arend, Ahrend), Arndt, Arne, Aarne, Aart (etc.). Regional variants of the name include: French: Arnaud, Arnault, Italian: Arnoldo, Dutch: Arnout, Arnoud, Croatian: Arnoldo, Portuguese: Arnoldo, Spanish: Arnaldo, Catalan: Arnau, Arnald. The German name was also adopted in Old West Norse (14th century), as Arnaldr (Icelandic: Arnaldur).

Arnold is also recorded as a surname (via a patronymic) from the early modern period. (Cornelius Arnold, b. 1711).

== List of people called Arnold ==
- Arnold I (1060–1135), Count of Looz
- Arnold I (fl. 1119–1147), Count of Cleves
- Arnold I (died 1197/1198), Bishop of Coria
- Arnold I (1337–1409), Lord of Egmond
- Arnold I, Count of Astarac
- Arnold II (died 1146), Count of Looz
- Arnold II of Isenburg (c. 1190–1259), Archbishop of Trier
- Arnold, Lord of IJsselstein (1304–1363), Dutch noble
- Arnold of Arnoldsweiler, German saint
- Arnold of Bergen (died 1434), Norwegian Roman Catholic bishop
- Arnold of Brescia (c. 1090–1155), Italian Augustinian friar
- Arnold of Egmond (1410–1473), Duke of Guelders
- Arnold of Lübeck (died 1211~1214), German Benedictine priest and chronicler
- Arnold of Soissons (died 1087), the patron saint of brewers
- Arnold of Torroja (died 1184), Spanish knight, Grand Master of the Knights Templar
- Arnold von Uissigheim (died 1336), German highwayman, bandit, and renegade knight
- Arnold Akberg (1894–1984), Estonian painter
- Arnold Alas (1911–1990), Estonian landscape architect
- Arnoldo Aleman, Nicaraguan politician who served as the 81st president of Nicaragua
- Arnold Anderson (1912–1996), New Zealand sprinter and hurdler
- Arnold Anderson, Native American chemical engineer
- Arnold Arbeit (1911–1974), American artist and architect
- Arnold M. Auerbach (1912–1998), American comedy writer
- Arnold "Red" Auerbach (1917–2006), American basketball coach
- H. Arnold Barton (1929–2016), American historian
- Arnold Bax (1883–1953), English composer, poet, and author
- Arnold Orville Beckman (1900–2004), American chemist, inventor, investor, and philanthropist
- Arnold Belgardt (1937–2015), Soviet Russian cyclist
- Arnold Bennett (1867–1931), English writer
- Arnold Böcklin (1827–1901), Swiss painter
- Arnold Boonen (1669–1729), Dutch portrait painter
- Arnold Børud (born 1947), Norwegian singer
- Arnold Franz Brasz (1888–1966), American painter, sculptor, and printmaker
- Arnold Bronckorst (fl. 1565–1583), Dutch painter
- Arnold Brown (1894–1960), Australian army officer
- Arnold Brown (1913–2002), the 11th General of The Salvation Army
- Arnold Brown (1927–1994), Canadian politician
- Stewart Arnold Brown (Arnie Brown; 1942–2019), Canadian ice hockey player
- Arnold Brown, Scottish entertainer
- Arnold von Bruck (c. 1500–1554), Franco-Flemish composer
- Arnold W. Brunner (1857–1925), American architect
- Arnold Bürkli (1833–1894), Swiss engineer
- Arnold Büscher (1899–1949), German SS concentration camp commandant executed for war crimes
- Arnold Chernushevich (1933–1991), Soviet Belarusian fencer
- Arnold Clark (1927–2017), Scottish businessman
- Arnold Clavio (born 1965), Filipino journalist, newscaster, and television host
- Arnold Cook (1922–1981), Australian academic and national guide dog pioneer
- Arnaud Démare (born 1991), French cyclist
- Arnold Denker (1914–2005), American chess player
- Arnold Ebiketie (born 1999), American football player
- Arnold Förster (1810–1884), German entomologist
- Arnold Fothergill (1854–1932), English cricketer
- Arnold Freeman (1886–1972), British writer, philosopher and anthroposophist
- Arnold Frick (born 1966), Liechtensteiner judoka
- Arnold van Gennep (1873–1957), Dutch-French ethnographer and folklorist
- Arnold Green (1920–2011), Estonian Soviet politician
- Arnold Green (1932/1933–2016), New Zealand rugby league player
- Arnold H. Green (1940–2019), American historian
- Arnold Greenberg (1932–2012), American businessman
- Arnold Greenberg, American businessman
- Arnold Henry Guyot (1807–1884), Swiss-American geologist and geographer
- Arnold Hauser (1892–1978), Hungarian art historian
- Arnold Heertje (1934–2020), Dutch economist
- Arnold Wienholt Hodson (1881–1944), British colonial administrator
- Arnold Horween (1898–1985), American football player and coach
- Arnold Issoko (born 1992), Congolese footballer
- Arnold Jackson (1891–1972), British athlete, army officer and barrister
- Arnold Jackson (1903–1971), English cricketer
- Arnold Jackson (born 1977), American football player
- Arnold Janssen (1837–1909), German-Dutch Roman Catholic priest and missionary, saint
- Arnold Jensen, American politician
- Arnold Jürgensen (1910–1944), Nazi Germany military officer
- Arnold Kanter (1945–2010), American politician
- Arnold Keyserling (1922–2005), German philosopher and theologian
- Arnold Kimber (born 1947), Estonian politician
- Arnold Kirke-Smith (1850–1927), English footballer
- Arnold Klebs (1870–1943), Swiss-American microbiologist
- Arnold Kohlschütter (1883–1969), German astronomer and astrophysicist
- Arnold Koller (born 1933), Swiss politician
- Arnold Kopelson (1935–2018), American film producer
- Arnold Kramer (1882–1976), American folk artist
- Arnold Krammer (1941–2018), American historian
- Arnold Laasner (1906–1964), Estonian footballer
- Arnold Lakhovsky (1880–1937), Ukrainian-Russian painter and sculptor
- Arnold Lang (1855–1914), Swiss naturalist
- Arnold Barry Latman (1936–2019), American baseball player
- Arnold Lazarus (1932–2013), South African psychologist
- Arnold Lechler (born 1991), German-Russian footballer
- Arnold Leese (1878–1956), British fascist politician and veterinarian
- Arnold J. Levine (born 1939), American molecular biologists
- Arnold Luhaäär (1905–1965), Estonian weightlifter
- Arnold Lunn (1888–1974), English skier, mountaineer and writer
- Arnold Majewski (1892–1942), Finnish military hero of Polish descent
- Arnold Manoff (1914–1965), American screenwriter
- Arnold Maran, Scottish surgeon and writer
- Arnold Mendelssohn (1855–1933), German composer
- Arnold Meri (1919–2009), Soviet Estonian military officer
- Arnold Metzger (1892–1974), German philosopher
- Arnold Mickens (born 1972), American football player
- Arnold Mitt (born 1988), Estonian basketball player
- Arnold Möller (1581–1655), German calligrapher
- Arnold Mühren (born 1951), Dutch football player and manager
- Arnold Musto (1883–1977), British civil engineer
- Arnold Newman (1918–2006), American photographer
- Arnold Nordmeyer (1901–1989), New Zealand politician
- Arnold Nötzli (1900–?), Swiss cyclist
- Arnold Origi (born 1983), Kenyan footballer
- Arnold Oss (1928–2024), American ice hockey player
- Arnold Östman (1939–2023), Swedish conductor
- Arnold Page (1851–1943), British clergyman
- Arnold Pagenstecher (1837–1913), German doctor and entomologist
- Arnold Palacios (1955–2025), Northern Marianan politician
- Arnold Palmer (1929–2016), American professional golfer
- Arnold Palmer (tennis) (1886–1973), British real tennis player
- Arnold Paole (died c. 1726), Serbian outlaw, supposed vampire
- Arnold Parsons (1926–2022), British wrestler
- Arnold Paucker (1921–2016), German historian and author
- Arnold Payne (cricketer) (1897–1973), English cricketer
- Arnold Payne (athlete) (born 1972), Zimbabwean athlete
- Arnold Penther (1865–1931), Austrian naturalist
- Arnold Peralta (1989–2015), Honduran footballer
- Arnold Perl (1914–1971), American dramatist
- Arnold Perlmutter (1859–1953), Jewish composer
- Arnold Peters (politician) (1922–1996), Canadian politician
- Arnold Peters (actor) (1925–2013), English actor
- Arnold Pick (1851–1924), Czech-German psychiatrist
- Arnold Picker (1913–1989), American film producer
- Arnold Pierret (1900–2000), Belgian gymnast
- Arnold Piesse (1872–1935), Australian politician
- Arnold Piggott (born 1946), Trinidadian politician
- Arnold Pihlak (1902–1985), Estonian footballer
- Arnold Pinnock (born 1967), Canadian actor
- Arnold Plackett (1887–1960), English architect
- Arnold Plant (1898–1978), British economist
- Arnold Plumer (1801–1869), American politician
- Arnold Poepke (1901–1989), German politician
- Arnold Pomerans (1920–2005), German-born British translator
- Arnold Pomfret (1900–1984), English cricketer, ophthalmologist, and Royal Navy officer
- Arnold Potter (1804–1872), American LDS Church leader
- Arnold Potts (1896–1968), Australian brigadier
- Arnold Powell (1882–1963), British priest
- Arnold Pressburger (1885-1951), Austrian film producer
- Arnold W. Proskin (born 1938), American politician
- Arnold L. Punaro (born 1946), United States Marine Corps general
- Arnold Ram, Trinidad and Tobago politician
- Arnold Lewis Raphel (1943–1988), American diplomat
- Arnold E. Reif (1924–2018), American cancer researcher
- Arnold S. Relman (1923–2014), American physician
- Arnold Ridley (1896–1984), English playwright and actor
- Arnold Rönnebeck (1885–1947), German-born American artist
- Arnold Rosé (1863–1946), Romanian-Austrian violinist
- Arnold Rothstein (1882–1928), American mob boss
- Arnold Rüütel (1928–2024), Estonian politician, President of Estonia
- Arnold Savage (1358–1410), English politician, Speaker of the House of Commons
- Arnold Savage II (ca. 1382–1420), English politician
- Arnold Scaasi (1930–2015), Canadian fashion designer
- Arnold Schoenberg (1874–1951), Austrian-American composer
- Arnold Schönhage (born 1934), German mathematician and computer scientist
- Arnold Schottländer (1854–1909), German chess player
- Arnold Schwarzenegger (born 1947), Austrian-born American bodybuilder, actor and politician, Governor of California
- Arnold S. Shapiro (1921–1962), American mathematician
- Arnold Shapiro (born 1941), American television producer and writer
- Arnold von Siemens (1853–1918), German telecommunications industrialist
- Arnold Šimonek (born 1990), Slovak footballer
- Arnold Sjöstrand (1903–1955), Swedish actor and film director
- Arnold Smith (1915–1994), Canadian diplomat
- Arnold Kirke Smith (1850–1927), English footballer
- Arnold Snyder, American gambler and gambling author
- Arnold Sommerfeld (1868–1951), German physicist
- Arnold Sorina (born 1988), Vanuatuan runner
- Arnold Spohr (1923–2010), Canadian ballet dancer, choreographer, and artistic director
- Arnold Stam (born 1968), Dutch speed skater and cyclist
- Arnold Stang (1918–2009), American actor and comedian
- Arnold Susi (1896–1968), Estonian lawyer and politician
- Arnold Townend (1880–1968), British politician
- Arnold Townsend (1912–1994), English cricketer
- Arnold Toynbee (1852–1883), British economic historian
- Arnold J. Toynbee (1889–1975), British historian and philosopher
- Arnolds Ūdris (born 1968), Latvian cyclist
- Arnold Vaide (1926–2011), Swedish runner and football coach
- Arnold Vihvelin (1892–1962), Estonian printmaker and painter
- Arnold Viiding (1911–2006), Estonian shot putter and discus thrower
- Arnold Volpe (1869–1940), Lithuanian-born American composer and conductor
- Arnold Vosloo (born 1962), South African-born American actor
- Arnold Walfisz (1892–1962), Polish mathematician
- Arnold Weiss (1924–2010), German-born American intelligence officer and lawyer
- Arnold Peter Weisz-Kubínčan (1898–1945), Jewish-Slovak painter
- Arnold Wesker (1932–2016), British dramatist
- Arnold Williams (cricketer) (1870–1929), Welsh-born New Zealand cricketer
- Arnold Williams (British politician) (1890–1958), British businessman and politician
- Arnold Williams (American politician) (1898–1970), American politician, Governor of Idaho
- Arnold Muir Wilson (1857–1909), British solicitor and politician
- Arnold Wilson (1884–1940), British politician and army officer
- Arnold Wolfendale (1927–2020), British astronomer
- Arnold Zwicky (born 1940), American linguist

== Disambiguation pages ==
- Arnold I (disambiguation)
- Arnold Anderson (disambiguation)
- Arnold Auerbach (disambiguation)
- Arnold Brown (disambiguation)
- Arnold Green (disambiguation)
- Arnold Greenberg (disambiguation)
- Arnold Jackson (disambiguation)
- Arnold Murray (disambiguation)

== Fictional characters ==
- Arnold Flass, character in the DC Comics universe
- Arnold Jackson, character in the NBC sitcom Diff'rent Strokes
- Arnold Layne, eponymous title of the 1967 debut single by Pink Floyd
- Arnold Rimmer, character in the television series Red Dwarf
- Dr. Arnold Rosen, neighbor in Mad Men
- Arnold Shortman, in Nickelodeon's Hey Arnold! media
- Arnold Vinick, in the television drama The West Wing
- Dr. Arnold Wayne, Betty Draper's psychiatrist in Mad Men
- Arnold Wesker, villain known as Ventriloquist in the DC Comics Universe
- Arnold von Winkelried, fictional hero in Swiss folklore
- Arnold Ziffel, in the television sitcom Green Acres

== See also ==
- Arnold (disambiguation)
- Arnold (surname)
- Arnaud (given name)
- Arnaud (surname)
- Arnau (disambiguation)
