= Richard Baron =

Richard Baron may refer to:

- Richard Baron (botanist) (1847–1907), English missionary and botanist working in Madagascar
- Richard Baron (dissenting minister) (c. 1700–1768), English dissenting minister and Whig pamphleteer
- Richard Baron (philosopher) (born 1958), British philosopher
- Richard Baron, real estate developer and co-founder of McCormack Baron Salazar
- Richard Baron (physician) (born 1953), president and CEO of American Board of Internal Medicine and ABIM Foundation
- Richard S. Baron (1901–1942), United States Navy officer

== See also ==
- Richard Barron, Canadian-born translator
- Richard Barron (basketball) (born 1969), basketball coach
- Richard Barrons (born 1959), British Army officer
