= Wabasso =

Wabasso may refer to:

- Wabasso (spider), an animal genus in the subfamily Erigoninae

places in the United States

- Wabasso, Florida
- Wabasso, Minnesota
