= Reiff =

Reiff may refer to:

== Places ==
Germany

- Reiff (Rhineland-Palatinate), a municipality

Italy

- Riva del Garda (German: Reiff am Gardasee), in Trentino-Alto Adige/Südtirol

United Kingdom

- Reiff, Ross-shire, Scotland, a crofting and fishing village

United States

- Reiff, California, a former settlement
- Reiff's Antique Gas Station Automotive Museum, California
- Reiff Farm, a historic farm in Pennsylvania

== People ==
- Charles Reiff (1940–1964), Luxembourgian boxer
- Ethan Reiff, American American screenwriter and producer
- Fritz Reiff (1888–1953), German stage and film actor
- Gaston Reiff (1921–1992), Belgian athlete
- Joe Reiff (1911–1988), American basketball player
- Johann Gottfried Reiff (fl. 1805), German philologist
- Lester Reiff (1877–1948), American jockey
- Lily Reiff (1866-1958), German composer and pianist
- Marion Reiff (born 1979), Austrian diver
- Patricia Reiff, Space scientist
- Rick Reiff (born 1952), American Pulitzer Prize-winning journalist
- Riley Reiff (born 1988), American football player
- Rudolf Reiff (1901–1961), German actor
- Ryszard Reiff (1923–2007), Polish politician, lawyer and resistance fighter
- Søren Reiff (born 1962), Danish guitar player, producer, composer and author

== See also ==
- Reif
