= Reif =

Reif is a surname, a variant of Reiff, and a given name. Notable people with the name include:

== Surname ==
- Alberto Reif (1946–2012), Italian football player
- Alison Motsinger-Reif, American geneticist and biostatistician
- Arnold E. Reif (born 1924), American cancer researcher
- Chris Reif, American soccer player
- Christian Reif (born 1984), German long jumper
- Emil Reif (born 1998), Danish Counter-Strike player
- Frederick Reif (1927–2019), American physicist
- Gertrude Reif Hughes (1936-2022), American professor of English
- John F. Reif (born 1951), American judge
- John Reif (born 1951), American academic
- L. Rafael Reif (born 1950), American educator
- Marcel Reif (born 1949), German journalist
- Patricia Reif (1930–2002), American philosopher and theologian
- Robert W. Reif (1921-2011), American politician and physician
- Sepp Reif (born 1937), German ice hockey player
- Stefan Reif (born 1944), Scottish academic
- Timothy M. Reif (born 1959), American jurist and lawyer

== Given name ==
- Reif Larsen, American author

== Sport ==
- Reif (automobile), 1950s racing car

== See also ==
- Reiff (disambiguation)
- Reif-Gintl
