= Bernardino de Mendoza =

Spanish diplomat and military commander

Coat of arms of the House of Mendoza

Bernardino de Mendoza (c. 1540 – 3 August 1604) was a Spanish military commander, diplomat, and writer on military history and politics. He served Philip II as ambassador to London and as a spy, from which he was expelled for his involvement in the Babington Plot against Elizabeth I. During the War of the Three Henrys, he coordinated with the Catholic League and Henry, Duke of Guise against the Huguenots.

== Biography ==
Bernardino de Mendoza was born in Guadalajara, Spain in around 1540, to Alonso Suarez de Mendoza, 3rd Count of Coruña and Viscount of Torija, and Juana Jimenez de Cisneros.

In 1560, he joined the army of Philip II and for more than 15 years fought in the Low Countries under the command of Fernando Álvarez de Toledo, Duke of Alba. During that period, he participated in the Spanish military actions at, among others, Haarlem, Mookerheyde, and Gembloux. In 1576, he was appointed a member of the military Order of St. James in recognition of those military achievements.

In February 1578, Philip II sent Mendoza as his ambassador to London. There, he acted not only as diplomat but also as a spy, using a variety of secret codes in the reports that he returned to Spain. Mendoza bought a silver cup shaped like an owl made by a German goldsmith in London as a gift for a friend.

Mendoza was a careful observer of Elizabeth and her statecraft. He wrote that during an audience in January 1579 Elizabeth lifted her farthingale to allow him sit close to her and talk privately. When the Portuguese ambassador left London she gave him silver plate and a jewel for his wife. At their leave-taking in person, she took a diamond ring from her finger and gave it to the diplomat. Mendoza reported this to Philip II as an example of her "little witcheries" which would charm her international relations. He advocated that Philip II should give presents of jewels to English ministers and courtiers, in order to win powerful friends. Mendoza suggested that the Earl of Sussex, William Cecil, James Croft, Christopher Hatton, and others should receive jewels. The Earl of Leicester, though he seemed an enemy of Spain, should also receive a gift so as not to arouse suspicion.

Mendoza was expelled from England in 1584, after his involvement in Francis Throckmorton's plot against Elizabeth I was revealed.

For the next six years, Bernardino de Mendoza served as Spanish ambassador to the King of France. As the effective agent of Philip's interventionist foreign policy, Mendoza acted in concert with the Catholic League for which he acted as paymaster by funnelling Habsburg funds to the Guise faction; he encouraged it to try, by popular riots, assassinations, and military campaigns, to undercut any moderate Catholic party that offered a policy of rapprochement with the Huguenots. Mendoza and his master considered them as nothing more than heretics who needed to be crushed and rooted out like an infection. His role in backing the extremist Catholic House of Guise became so public that King Henry III demanded his recall.

In 1591, with the Catholic League in disarray after the assassination of Henry I, Duke of Guise, he resigned due to ill health. His eyesight had been deteriorating for years, and by the time of his return to Spain, he had become completely blind. His last years were spent in his house in Madrid.

Many of his dispatches to Madrid were first deciphered only in the Simancas archives by De Lamar Jensen; they revealed, for the first time, Mendoza's role in organising and co-ordinating the Paris riots led by the Duke of Guise, known as the Day of the Barricades (12 May 1588), which had been presented as a spontaneous rising of the people and timed to coincide with the sailing of the Spanish Armada. Among Mendoza's public writings is a famous account of the war in the Low Countries that is entitled Comentario de lo sucecido en los Paises Bajos desde el año 1567 hasta el de 1577. Bernardino also published a book on the art of warfare, under the title Theórica y práctica de la guerra and a Spanish translation of the Politicorum sive civilis doctrinae libri sex, by the Flemish philosopher Justus Lipsius.
