= Archibald Bower =

Scottish historian (1686–1766)

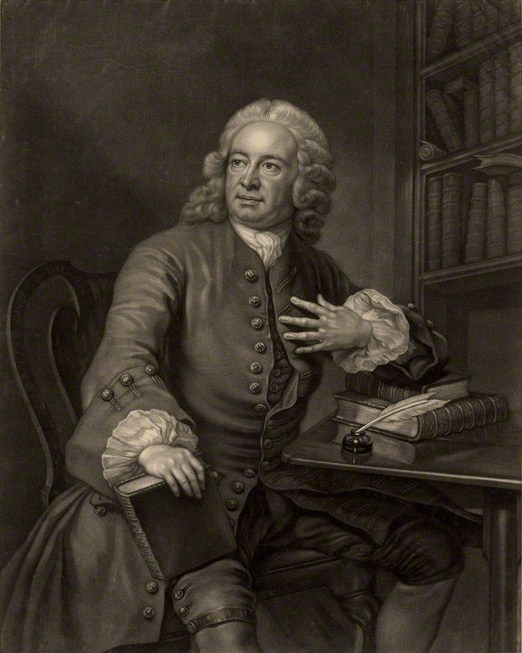
- Born: 17 January 1686; Dundee, Scotland
- Died: 3 September 1766 (aged 80)
- Occupation: historian
- Organization: Jesuit
- Notable work: History of Rome (1735–44), History of the Popes (1748–66)

Archibald Bower (17 January 1686 – 3 September 1766) was a Scottish historian noted for his complicated and varying religious faith and the accounts he gave of it. Scholars now consider them lacking in credibility.

Educated at the Scots College, Douai, Bower became a Jesuit in Rome. He joined the Church of England a while after returning to London in 1726. He wrote a History of the Popes (1748–66, 7 volumes). This work was drawn into a damaging controversy concerning his apparent return to the Jesuit or Catholic fold. By the end of his life, it appeared he had changed religion three times.

== Life ==
=== Early life ===
He was born on 17 January 1686 at or near Dundee. In 1702 he was sent to the Scots College, Douai; he then went to Rome, and was admitted to the Society of Jesus on 9 December 1706. After a novitiate of two years, he went in 1712 to Fano, where he taught classics till 1714, when he moved to Fermo. In 1717 he was recalled to Rome to study divinity in the Roman College, and in 1721 was transferred to the college of Arezzo, remaining till 1723, and became reader of philosophy. He was next sent to Florence, and the same year moved on to Macerata, where he stayed till 1726. By then he was, probably, professed of the four vows (his own statements concerning himself may not be reliable).

The turning-point in Bower's career was his transfer from Macerata to Perugia, and his departure from there to England in 1726. Jesuit records show that the Order sent him to England. Bower gave a quite different story in Answer to a Scurrilous Pamphlet (1757). Another account had been previously published by Richard Baron in 1750, allegedly based on the story Bower gave of his "escape" to Dr. Hill, chaplain to the archbishop of Canterbury. A third account is printed at the end of Bower and Tillemont compared (1757) by Douglas.

=== In England ===
On his arrival in England in June or July 1726 Bower became acquainted with Edward Aspinwall, formerly a Jesuit, who introduced him to Samuel Clarke. After several meetings with Aspinwall, Clarke, and George Berkeley, he withdrew from the communion of the Roman Catholic church, and left the Society of Jesus. He wrote that he was then for six years a Protestant of no particular denomination, before he conformed to the church of England. In fact, he was making tentative contact with the Jesuits in the early 1730s.

Through the royal physician Thomas Goodman, Bower obtained a recommendation to Lord Aylmer, who wanted a classical tutor. He was for several years on close terms with Aylmer and was introduced to his connections, including George Lyttelton, who became a loyal friend. He took on a tutoring post, the education of the son of a Mr. Thompson, of Cooley, Berkshire; he switched after a year to Aylmer's household.

Bower was reconciled to the Catholic church in 1744 by the Jesuit, Philip Carterest. This reconversion was preceded by negotiations of over a decade, and financial arrangements. Bower, however, soon again grew dissatisfied with his situation. He began a correspondence with Father Sheldon, the Jesuit provincial; and he received back his invested funds on 20 June 1747.

On the death of Francis Say, keeper of Queen Caroline of Ansbach's library (10 September 1748), Bower obtained the place through the interest of Lyttelton with the prime minister Henry Pelham. The next year (4 August 1749), he married a niece of Bishop William Nicolson, a daughter of a clergyman of the Church of England. This lady had a fortune, and a child by a former husband. He had already been engaged in a treaty of marriage, which did not take effect, in 1745. In April 1754 Lyttelton appointed him clerk of the buck-warrants.

=== Death ===
Bower died on 3 September 1766, and was buried in St Marylebone Parish Church's churchyard. The epitaph on his tomb describes him as "a man exemplary for every social virtue, justly esteemed by all who knew him for his strict honesty and integrity, a faithful friend, and a sincere christian". He bequeathed all of his property to his wife, who attested that he died a Protestant (London Chronicle, 11 October 1766).

== Works ==
While he resided with Lord Aylmer, Bower wrote Historia Literaria, a monthly review that appeared from 1730 to 1734. During the following nine years (1735–1744), he was employed on the Universal History, to which he contributed the history of Rome. He was paid to revise its second edition.

On 25 March 1747 Bower issued proposals for printing by subscription his History of the Popes. He explained that researches designed to vindicate papal supremacy had had the opposite effect on him. He presented the first volume to the king 13 May 1748. The second volume appeared in 1751, and towards the end of 1753 the third volume, which brought down his history to the death of Pope Stephen II in 757. It was in 1754 that the first serious attack was made on the work, in a pamphlet by Alban Butler, published anonymously at Douai as Remarks on the two first volumes of the late Lives of the Popes; in letters from a Gentleman to a Friend in the Country.

A controversial storm then broke over Bower. Letters addressed by Bower to the provincial of the Jesuits fell into the hands of Sir Henry Bedingfield, who asserted that they showed Bower was a Catholic. Bower maintained that these letters were forgeries by the Jesuits. Then, John Douglas published in 1756 a pamphlet supporting the genuineness of the letters; and testimony of a Mrs. Hoyles whom Bower had converted. There was a reply from Bower's side, and Douglas published a second tract, Bower and Tillemont compared (1757), in which he argued that the History of the Popes, especially the first volume, was in effect a translation of the work of Louis-Sébastien Le Nain de Tillemont. In 1757 Bower brought out three long pamphlets, and Douglas followed with A Full Confutation of all the Facts advanced in Mr. Bower's Three Defences (1757), and A Complete and Final Detection of A——d B——r (1758), with documentation from Italy, and arguing that Bower was an imposter.

David Garrick, once a friend of Bower, threatened to write a farce in which Bower was to be introduced on the stage as a mock convert. Bower replied with personal attacks and rebuttals. Before the controversy had ended, he published his fourth volume, and in 1757 an abridgment of the first four volumes of his work was published in French at Amsterdam.

In 1761 Bower seems to have had a hand in the anonymous Authentic Memoirs concerning the Portuguese Inquisition, in a series of letters to a friend. Around the same time he produced the fifth volume of his History of the Popes, with a summary of his dealings with Catholics. The rest of his history did not appear till just before the author's death, when the sixth and seventh volumes were published together; but with the period from 1600 to 1758 covered in 26 pages. The History of the Popes was reprinted with a continuation by Samuel Hanson Cox, in 3 vols., Philadelphia, 1844–5.
