= Thomas Metzger =

American sinologist (1933–2025)

Thomas A. Metzger (1933 – 17 October 2025; Chinese Character: 墨子刻) was a senior fellow at Stanford University's Hoover Institution. He was the son of the German philosopher Arnold Metzger (1892–1974). He specialized in the intellectual and institutional history of China, studying both the premodern and modern periods. Toward the end of his career, his research focused on contemporary China's moral-political discourse and its historical roots, dealing with both China Mainland and Taiwan. He also wrote on U.S.–China policy issues and lectured widely in English and Chinese in the United States, Europe, Taiwan, China, and Hong Kong.

== Life ==
He received a B.A. from the University of Chicago in 1952, and an M.A. from Georgetown University in 1959, and a Ph.D. from Harvard University in History and Far Eastern Languages in 1967.

His many articles and book reviews in Chinese and English include "The Organizational Capabilities of the Ch'ing State on the Field of Commerce," in W. E. Willmott, ed., Economic Organization in Chinese Society (Stanford University Press, 1972); "Some Ancient Roots of Chinese Thought," in Early China (1987); "Continuities between Modern and Premodern China," in P.A. Cohen and M. Goldman, eds., Ideas across Cultures (Council on East Asian Studies, Harvard University, 1990); "The Western Concept of the Civil Society in the Context of Chinese History," in S. Kaviraj and S. Khilnani, eds., Civil Society: History and Possibilities (Cambridge University Press, 2001); with R.H. Myers, "Chinese Nationalism and American Policy," Orbis (winter 1998); articles in mainland Chinese journals, such as Xue-shu si-xiang ping-lun and Hua-dong shi-fan da-xueh xue-bao as well as articles in the Hong Kong journal, She-hui li-lun hsueh-pao. He is also the author of The Internal Organization of Ch'ing Bureaucracy: Legal, Normative, and Communication Aspects (Harvard University Press, 1973) and Escape from Predicament: Neo-Confucianism and China's Evolving Political Culture (Columbia University Press, 1977). A Chinese translation of the latter was released in 1990 by Kiangsu jen-min ch'u-pan-she in Nanking (latest reprinting in 1996). His latest book is A Cloud Across the Pacific: Essays on the Clash between Chinese and Western Political Theories Today (Hong Kong: The Chinese University Press, 2005).

In 1968–1969, he was a lecturer in Chinese studies at the Hebrew University of Jerusalem, and he joined the department of history at the University of California at San Diego (UCSD) in 1970, staying there until 1990, when he retired as a professor emeritus.

In 1980, he received the Award for Excellence in Research from the Chancellor's Associates of the University of California, San Diego. From 1975 through 1987, he was the only winner of this prize, annually awarded to a UCSD faculty member, outside science, engineering, and medicine. In 1982–1983 and 1984–1985, he was a visiting research professor of Chinese history at National Taiwan Normal University.

In 1994, he was appointed distinguished visiting professor at the Chinese University of Hong Kong under the Chinese University Hong Kong–Taiwan Exchange Program and also delivered the Ch'ien Mu Lecture in History and Culture at New Asia College, Chinese University of Hong Kong.

In 1995, he served as visiting professor at East China Normal University, Shanghai. In 2000, he was appointed visiting professor at Wuhan University.

In the fall of 2001, he was distinguished visiting professor, department of history, Peking University, and guest research professor, Chinese Academy of Social Sciences, Division of Chinese Philosophy. In November 2001 he was appointed adviser to the department of history, Tsing-hua University.

In March 2003, he gave the inaugural lecture of the T'ang Chün-i Lecture Series instituted by the Center for Chinese Studies, the University of Michigan, Ann Arbor. In December 2004, he gave a Daxia Forum lecture at East China Normal University, Shanghai; a keynote lecture for the conference organized by the department of philosophy, The Chinese University of Hong Kong, on Ch'ien Mu, T'ang Chün-I, Mou Tsang-san, and Hsu Fu-kuan; and lectures at Peking University and Tsinghua University. In 2004, he was appointed to a five-year term as consultant to the International Confucian Association in Beijing. In February 2005, he became a guest professor of the Institute of Philosophy, Chinese Academy of Social Sciences.

Metzger died on 17 October 2025.
