= Arnell =

Arnell is both a surname and a given name. Notable people with the name include:

== People with the surname ==
- Alan Arnell (1933–2013), English-born former footballer
- Alma Arnell (1857–1934), Swedish painter
- Amy Arnell, American singer
- Ginny Arnell (born 1942), American pop & country music singer and songwriter
- Guillaume Arnell (born 1962), member of the Senate of France
- Hampus Wilhelm Arnell (1848–1932), Swedish bryologist
- Helena Arnell (1697–1751), one of the first Finnish painters in Finland
- Jonas Arnell (born 1969), Swedish Senior Systems Manager and expert on phaleristics
- Kate Arnell (born 1983), British television presenter
- Lauren Arnell (born 1987), Australian rules footballer
- Lawrence Arnell, rapper and singer from Philadelphia, Pennsylvania
- Richard Arnell (1917–2009), English composer of classical music
- Samuel Mayes Arnell (1833–1903), American politician
- Sigfrid Vilhelm Arnell (1895–1970), Swedish medical practitioner and hepaticologist
- Vaughan Arnell (born 1961), British music videos and television commercials director

== People with the given name ==
- Arnell Engstrom (1897–1970), American businessman and politician
- Arnell Horton (1892–1987), Australian cricketer
- Arnell Ignacio (born 1964), Filipino game show host, comedian and actor

== See also ==
- Collection d'Arnell Andréa, French darkwave band founded by Jean-Christophe d'Arnell, Pascal Andréa, and Chloé St Liphard in 1986
- Arenella
- Arndell (disambiguation)
- Arniella
