= Arnold Jackson =

Arnold Jackson may refer to:

- Arnold Jackson (British Army officer) (1891–1972), British Army general, athlete and barrister
- Arnold Jackson (cricketer) (1903–1971), English cricketer
- Arnold Jackson (American football) (born 1977), American football player
- Arnold Jackson (character), character on the television series Diff'rent Strokes, portrayed by Gary Coleman
- Arnold Jackson, character in the cartoon series Totally Spies!

== See also ==
- Jackson Arnold (disambiguation)
