= Richard Baron (dissenting minister) =

Richard Baron (c. 1700–1768) was an English dissenting minister, Whig pamphleteer, and editor of Locke, Milton and others.

== Life ==
He was born at Leeds, and educated at the University of Glasgow from 1737 to 1740, which he left with a testimonial signed by Francis Hutcheson and Robert Simson. Baron became a friend of Thomas Gordon, author of the Independent Whig, and afterwards of Thomas Hollis, whom he helped in collecting works defending the republicanism of the seventeenth century.

He had a congregation at Pinners' Hall, London in 1753. An impractical person, Baron died in poverty.

== Works ==
He edited in 1751 a collection of tracts by Gordon, under the title, A Cordial for Low Spirits, 3 vols.; and in 1752 a similar collection by Gordon and others, called The Pillars of Priestcraft and Orthodoxy shaken, in 2 vols. An enlarged edition of the last, in four volumes, including tracts by Benjamin Hoadly, Arthur Ashley Sykes, William Arnall, and Francis Blackburne, was prepared by him, and published in 1767 for the benefit of his widow and three children.

In 1751 he edited Algernon Sidney's Discourse concerning Government, and in 1753 John Milton's prose works; of which an edition by John Toland had appeared in 1697, and one by Thomas Birch in 1738. Baron later found the second edition of Eikonoklastes, and reprinted it in 1756. He also edited Edmund Ludlow's Memoirs in 1751, and Marchamont Nedham's Excellency of a Free State in 1757. Hollis engaged him in 1766 to superintend an edition of Andrew Marvell; but the plan was dropped and it was later taken up by Edward Thompson in 1776.

He wrote also against Archibald Bower in A faithful account of Mr Archibald Bower's motives for leaving his office of secretary to the court of inquisition (1750).
