= Arnold Brown =

Arnold Brown may refer to:

- Arnold Brown (comedian) (born 1936), Scottish comedian
- Arnold Brown (politician) (1927–1994), Canadian politician in Manitoba
- Arnold Brown (Salvation Army) (1913–2002)
- Arnold Brown (soldier) (1894–1960), Australian army officer
- Arnold Brown (American football) (born 1962), American football defensive back
- Arnold E. Brown (born 1932), American politician in the New Jersey Legislature
- Arnold M. Brown (1931–2024), American politician in South Dakota
- Arnie Brown (1942–2019), Canadian ice hockey player
