= Arnall =

Arnall is a surname. Notable people with the surname include:

- Ellis Arnall (1907–1992), American politician, 69th Governor of Georgia from 1943 to 1947
- Julia Arnall (1928–2018), Austrian actress
- Roland Arnall (1939–2008), French-born American businessman and diplomat
- William Arnall (died 1736), English political writer
- Curtis C. Arnall (1898–1964), stage and radio actor, famous for his role as Buck Rogers in oldies radio program Buck Rogers in the 25th Century.

== See also ==
- Arnall Patz (1920–2010), American medical doctor and research professor at Johns Hopkins University
- Arnall Middle School, middle school located in Newnan, Georgia but serves parts of Sharpsburg, Georgia
