= John Reif =

American academic

John H. Reif (born 1951) is an American academic, and professor of computer science at Duke University, who has made contributions to large number of fields in computer science: ranging from algorithms and computational complexity theory to robotics. He has also published in many other scientific fields including chemistry (in particular, nanoscience), optics (in particular optical computing and design of head-mounted displays), and mathematics (in particular graph theory and game theory).

== Biography ==
Reif received a BS (magna cum laude) from Tufts University in 1973, a M.S. from Harvard University in 1975 and a Ph.D. from Harvard University in 1977.

From 1983 to 1986 he was associate professor of Harvard University, and since 1986 he has been Professor of Computer Science at Duke University. Currently he holds the Hollis Edens Distinguished Professor, Trinity College of Arts and Sciences, Duke University. From 2011 to 2014 he was Distinguished Adjunct Professor, Faculty of Computing and Information Technology (FCIT), King Abdulaziz University (KAU), Jeddah, Saudi Arabia.

He has also contributed to bringing together various disjoint research communities working in different areas of nano-sciences by organizing (as General Chairman) annual Conferences on "Foundations of Nanoscience: Self-assembled architectures and devices" (FNANO) for last 20 years.

He has been awarded Fellow of the following organizations: American Association for the Advancement of Science, IEEE, ACM, and the Institute of Combinatorics.

He is the son of Arnold E. Reif and like him he has dual citizenship in the USA and Austria.

== Research contributions ==
John H. Reif has made contributions to large number of fields in computer science: ranging from algorithms and computational complexity theory to robotics and to game theory. He developed efficient randomized algorithms and parallel algorithms for a wide variety of graph, geometric, numeric, algebraic, and logical problems. His Google Scholar H-index is 76.

In the area of robotics, he gave the first hardness proofs for robotic motion planning as well as efficient algorithms for a wide variety of motion planning problems.

He also has led applied research projects: parallel programming languages (Proteus System for parallel programming), parallel architectures (Blitzen, a massively parallel machine), data compression (massively parallel loss-less compression hardware), and optical computing (free-space holographic routing). His papers on these topics can be downloaded here.

John H. Reif is President of Eagle Eye Research, Inc., which specializes in defense applications of DNA biotechnology.

He is co-founder of the company Domus Diagnostics, Inc. which is developing an at-home molecular testing platform for various diseases, including COVID-19, RSV, and influenza A and B.

=== Research in nanoscience ===
More recently, he has centered his research in nanoscience and in particular DNA nanotechnology, DNA computing, and DNA nanorobotics. In the last dozen years his group at Duke has designed and experimentally demonstrated in the lab a variety of novel self-assembled DNA nanostructures and DNA lattices, including the first experimental demonstrations of molecular scale computation and patterning using DNA assembly. His group also experimentally demonstrated various molecular robotic devices composed of DNA, including one of the first autonomous unidirectional DNA walker that walked on a DNA track. He also has done significant work on controlling errors in self-assembly and the stochastic analysis of self-assembly.

== See also ==
- Kinodynamic planning

== Publications ==
He is the author of over 200 publications. A selection:

- 2003. Hao Yan, Thomas H. LaBean, Liping Feng, and John H. Reif, Directed Nucleation Assembly of Barcode Patterned DNA Lattices, Proceedings of the National Academy of Sciences, Volume 100, No. 14, pp. 8103–8108 (July 8, 2003).
- 2004. Peng Yin, Hao Yan, Xiaoju G. Daniel, Andrew J. Turberfield, John H. Reif, A Unidirectional DNA Walker Moving Autonomously Along a Linear Track, Angewandte Chemie, Volume 43, Number 37, pp. 4906–4911 (Sept. 20, 2004).
- 2007. John H. Reif and Thomas H. LaBean, Autonomous Programmable Biomolecular Devices Using Self-Assembled DNA Nanostructures, Communications of the ACM, Volume 50, Issue 9, pp. 46–53 (Sept 2007).
- 2008. Peng Yin, Rizal F. Hariadi, Sudheer Sahu, Harry M.T. Choi, Sung Ha Park, Thomas H. LaBean, John H. Reif, Programming DNA Tube Circumferences, Science, Vol. 321. no. 5890, pp. 824–826, (August 8, 2008).
- 2022. Daniel Fu, Raghu Pradeep Narayanan, Abhay Prasad, Fei Zhang, Dewight Williams, John S. Schreck, Hao Yan, John Reif, Automated Design of 3D DNA Origami with Non-Rasterized 2D Curvature, Science Advances, Volume 8, Issue 51, (2022).

== Books ==
- Parallel Algorithm Derivation and Program Transformation, (with Robert Paige and Ralph Wachter), Kluwer Academic Publishers, Boston, MA 1993.
- Handbook of Randomized Computing, (with Sanguthevar Rajasekaran, Panos M. Pardalos and José Rolim), Springer, New York, NY, 2001.
- Synthesis of Parallel Algorithms, Morgan Kaufmann Publishers, San Francisco, CA, 1993.
- DNA-based Self-assembly and Nanorobotics, (with S. Sahu), VDM Verlag, Saarbrücken, Germany, 2008.
