= Arnold Green =

Arnold Green may refer to:

- Arnold Green (politician) (1920–2011), Estonian Soviet politician and Olympic organizer
- Arnold Green (rugby league) (1932 or 1933–2016), New Zealand rugby league international
- Arnold H. Green (1940–2019), BYU professor and historian who specializes in Tunisia
