= Wabasso replicatus =

Scientific classification
- Kingdom: Animalia
- Phylum: Arthropoda
- Subphylum: Chelicerata
- Class: Arachnida
- Order: Araneae
- Infraorder: Araneomorphae
- Family: Linyphiidae
- Genus: Wabasso
- Species: W. replicatus

Binomial name
- Wabasso replicatus (Holm, 1950)

Species of spider

Wabasso replicatus is spider species from Britain to Russia.
