= Jackson Arnold =

Jackson Arnold may refer to:

- Jackson D. Arnold (1912–2007), U.S. Navy admiral
- Jackson Arnold (American football) (born 2004), American football player

== See also ==
- Arnold Jackson (disambiguation)
