= Wabasso (spider) =

Scientific classification
- Kingdom: Animalia
- Phylum: Arthropoda
- Subphylum: Chelicerata
- Class: Arachnida
- Order: Araneae
- Infraorder: Araneomorphae
- Family: Linyphiidae
- Genus: Wabasso; Millidge, 1984

Type species
- W. quaestio (Chamberlin, 1949)

Species
- 8, see text

Genus of spiders

Wabasso is a genus of sheet weavers that was first described by Alfred Frank Millidge in 1984.

== Species ==
As of June 2019 it contains eight species:

- Wabasso cacuminatus Millidge, 1984 – Russia, Canada, USA
- Wabasso hilairoides Eskov, 1988 – Russia
- Wabasso koponeni Tanasevitch, 2006 – Russia
- Wabasso millidgei Eskov, 1988 – Russia
- Wabasso quaestio (Chamberlin, 1949) (type) – Canada, Greenland
- Wabasso replicatus (Holm, 1950) – Northern Europe, northern Russia
- Wabasso saaristoi Tanasevitch, 2006 – Russia
- Wabasso tungusicus Eskov, 1988 – Russia
