= Arnold M. Brown =

American politician (1931–2024)

Member of the South Dakota Senate from the 7th district
- In office 1997–2004

Member of the South Dakota House of Representatives from the 7th district
- In office 1993–1996

Personal details
- Born: March 5, 1931 Sherman, South Dakota, U.S.
- Died: December 27, 2024 (aged 93)
- Party: Republican
- Spouse: Doris Krogstad
- Children: Six
- Profession: Executive

Arnold M. Brown (March 5, 1931 – December 27, 2024) was an American politician. He served in the South Dakota House of Representatives from 1993 to 1996 and in the Senate from 1997 to 2004.

Brown died on December 27, 2024, at the age of 93.
