= Arnold Lakhovsky =

Russian painter

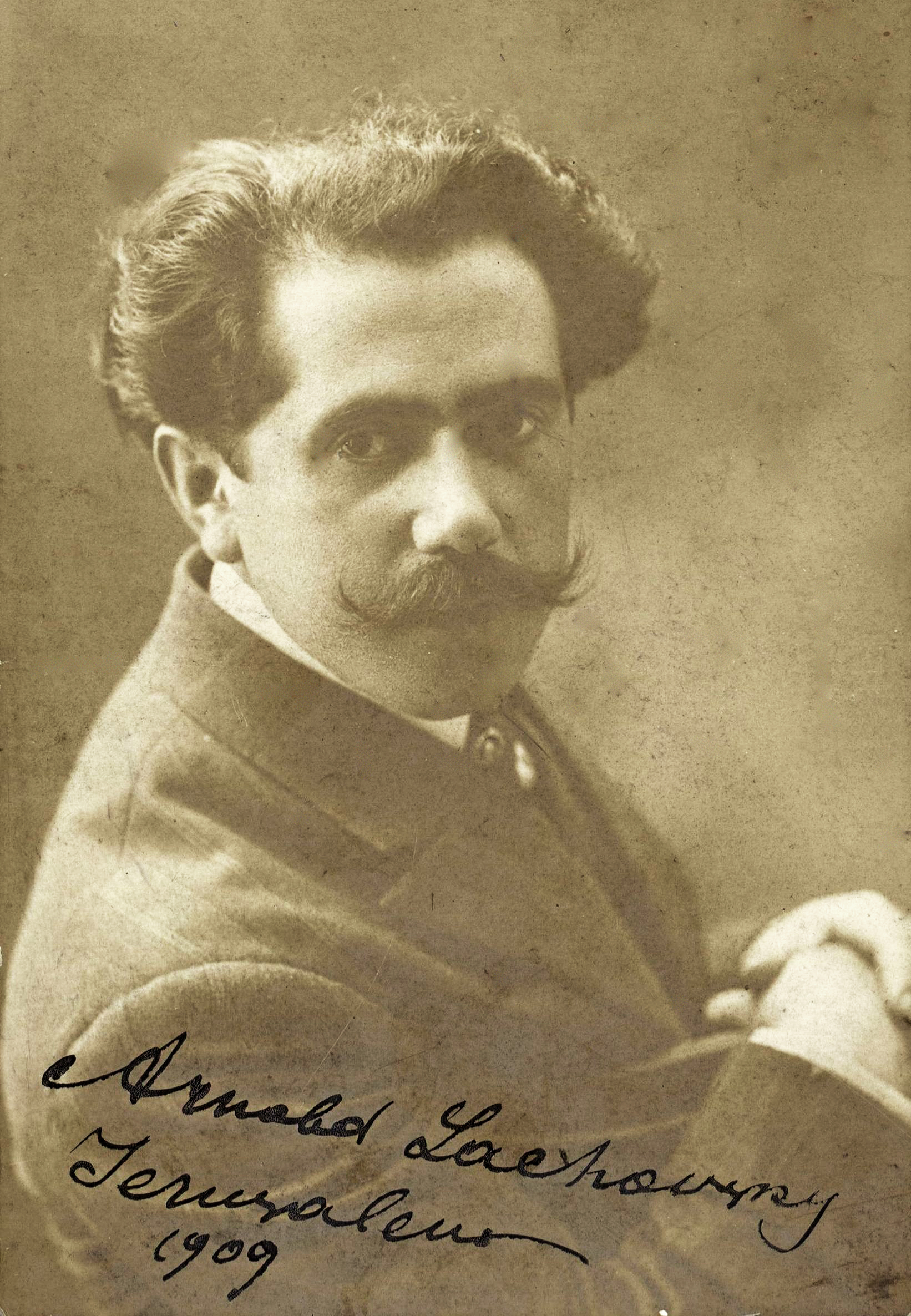
Arnold Lakhovsky, 1909

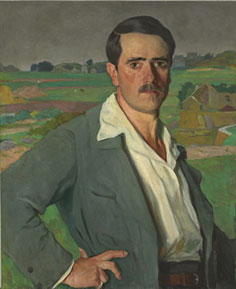
Self-portrait of Lakhovsky

Arnold Borisovich Lakhovsky (Ukrainian: Арнольд Борисович Лаховський, Russian: Арнольд Борисович Лаховский, also known as Aaron Berkovich; born 1880 – 1937) was a painter and sculptor of Ukrainian-Jewish descent, he was known for his landscape paintings.

Lakhovsky completed his art education at the Art Academy of Odessa, and also in Munich and Saint Petersburg, where he eventually resided. In 1925 he emigrated to Paris, and his paintings were exhibited in an art museum there. Later in 1933 he finally moved to New York City and taught at Boston's School of the Museum of Fine Arts.

== Biography ==
Arnold Borisovich Lakhovsky was born 27 January [O.S. 15 January] 1880 in Chernobyl, Russian Empire (now Ukraine).

Having graduated from Odessa Art School (1902), where he studied in the workshops of K. Kostandi and G. Ladyzhensky, he later studied at the workshop of Maro at the Academy of Fine Arts, Munich.

In 1904 he moved to St. Petersburg, Russia, to join the workshop of Ilya Repin at the Royal Academy of Arts Higher Fine Art School. In 1908 he left for Palestine and spent 3 months teaching at Bezalel Art School (now Bezalel Academy of Arts and Design) in Jerusalem.

Having returned to Russia, he continued his studies at the Higher Fine Art School at the workshops of P. Tchistyakov (1908–09), A. Kiselyov (1909–11), and N. Doubovskoy (1911–12). Graduated at A-level on November 1, 1912. Awarded the "qualified artist" title for The Last Rays painting in 1912.

Lakhovsky lived in St. Petersbourg and worked mostly in the city and its suburbs and Northwest Russia, including the town of Pskov. He joined the Kouindgi Society (1915) and The Wanderers Society (1916). He became one of the founding members of the Jewish Arts Encouragement Society in November 1915, donating his works to charity auctions.

In 1925, Lakhovsky was invited by the Luxembourg Museum in Paris and left for France. He was a board member of the artists section of the Russian Artists Union in France.

In 1933 he moved to New York City, where his main occupation was painting portraits on commission. In 1935, along with Boris Grigoriev and A. Yakovlev, he taught at the School of the Museum of Fine Arts, Boston.

Lakhovsky died on January 7, 1937, at Beth Israel Hospital in New York City of leukemia, followed by pneumonia. He was buried at Beth David Elmont cemetery in Long Island, New York.
