= Arnold Greenberg =

Arnold Greenberg may refer to:

- Arnold Greenberg (Coleco), American businessman, CEO of Coleco in the 1970s and 1980s
- Arnold Greenberg (Snapple) (died 2012), American businessman who co-founded Snapple, a brand of tea and juice drinks
