= Johann Gottfried Reiff =

German philologist

Johann Gottfried Reiff (Latin: Joannes Gothofredus Reiff) was a German philologist. He was born in Klein-Schönberg on 7 November 1772, and admitted to the Latina August Hermann Francke gymnasium in Halle on 27 October 1787. He published an edition of Artemidorus's Oneirocritica in 1805. He died in Dresden on 7 August 1807.
