= Arnold Freeman =

British writer, anthroposophist and actor (1886–1972)

Arnold James Freeman (24 March 1886 – 8 March 1972) was a British writer, philosopher, anthroposophist, adult educator, actor, director, Fabian Socialist, Labour Party candidate and co-founder of the anthroposophical magazine, The Golden Blade. He was the founder and first Warden of the Sheffield Educational Settlement.

== Early years ==
Freeman came from a middle-class, non-conformist background, the family involved in importing tobacco and manufacturing cigars. At various times they lived in different houses within the Hoxton area of London. He is the brother of Sir Ralph Freeman consulting engineer for the Sydney Harbour Bridge and of Labour M.P. Peter Freeman. He and his brothers all attended Haberdashers' Aske's School. On completing school in 1905, Arnold went on to study at St John's College, Oxford where, being a committed Socialist, he joined the Fabian Society. He was a vegetarian and engaged in social work from an early age, having been a member of the Highbury Quadrant Congregationalist church.

He and his sister Daisy spent a year at the Quaker Settlement in Woodbrooke, Birmingham and thereafter he began to do extramural work in tutorial classes for the Universities of Sheffield, London and Oxford. He also began lecturing at the same time he started to teach History and Economic History for the Workers' Educational Association, gradually expanding this into a concern with human nature and human idealism as expressed through Literature, Art and Philosophy. Particularly his work in Sheffield brought him into the mining areas of South Yorkshire.

== The Sheffield Settlement ==
In 1918 he became founding Warden of the Sheffield Educational Settlement in Shipton Street, Upperthorpe, Sheffield at first under the YMCA and later under a Council that included notable local figures. It was part of the university Settlement movement, which "sought to bring education, improvement and hope to the lives of the poor and socially disadvantaged in the decades before the development of the Welfare State following the Second World War. The early decades of the Sheffield Settlement coincided with the serious hardship of the post-First World War era, typified by the Depression and mass unemployment."

Its stated mission was "to establish in the City of Sheffield the Kingdom of God".

"By the Kingdom of God we mean streets along which it is a pleasure to walk; homes worthy of those who live in them; workplaces in which people enjoy working; public-houses that are centres of social and educational life; kinemas that show elevating films; schools that would win the approval of Plato; churches made up of men and women indifferent to their own salvation; an environment in which people "may have life and have it abundantly". By "Education" we mean everything by means of which people may become more spiritual; everything that enriches human beings, with That which described in three words is Beauty, Truth and Goodness, and described in one word as GOD."

== Encounter with Anthroposophy ==
On a visit to Munich, Germany in 1911, Freeman had had a brief meeting with Rudolf Steiner which, although leaving no strong impression on him, he describes this first meeting as follows which was written shortly after a short visit to Ernst Haeckel. Freeman, tells us travelled on the overnight train to Munich arriving there on Wednesday 12 July. His impression of Steiner goes as follows: 'It was not altogether a satisfactory interview, for I had nothing in particular to see him about and he was halfway through tea when I arrived. I told him I wanted to speak to him about my life and we agreed to meet at Karlsruhe in October. I gave him a part of Haeckel's message and we agreed that Haeckel was hopelessly materialistic. We really talked about nothing worth relating; we were discussing whether I could see him next day and why I must go etc. but I met him and that was all I wanted. He is a fine man. I liked his complete abandon. He did not look as though he had shaved for a week and his collar was unkempt and dirty. He wore a shabby frock-coat and in the total ensemble looked exactly like a low comedian. He might have passed for that in the street to those who do not read faces, but his face is that of a great man. He has a wonderfully kind smile; you can see that he is a great thinker and there is something deep and wonderful about him that I did not find in Haeckel...[who] represents the 19th Century; he typifies the older science; he is the last of the materialists. Steiner stands for the 20th century and the coming science. I suppose that Haeckel and Steiner are the two greatest thinkers in Germany today and I have interviewed them both within four and twenty hours! In his booklet Thou Eye Among the Blind. In 1921, however, he describes a second encounter:

"Very shortly afterwards I came across an article of Dr. Steiner’s in the Hibbert Journal. It was a translation of an essay that originally appeared in the Soziale Zukunft in Switzerland. It bore the bleak title "Spiritual Life: Civil Rights: Industrial Economy". This article made an immediate and profound impression upon me. I underwent something like an instantaneous conversion. Here was a thinker altogether greater than the Shaws and the Webbs and the Wellses. Here was somebody who saw all round the social problem. What Steiner had to say in this connection led me to consider what he had to say in other connections. It swiftly came about that for me there was now only one question in my life: “How can I help that man?” For me and others like me this question knocks insistently at their hearts."

In 1922 he was co-organiser together with Professor Millicent Mackenzie of the large public conference "Spiritual Values in Education and in Social Life", run predominantly at Manchester College whose principal, Dr L.P. Jacks was another sympathiser and where Rudolf Steiner was able to put forward his ideas to a group of British educators. This conference marked the beginning of the establishment of Steiner-Waldorf education in the UK.

These convictions caused some conflict amongst some members of the Settlement's Council but it was Freeman's main aim to achieve spiritual values through education. He had come to Sheffield as a university tutor, and members of the university's staff played a major role in the work of the Settlement, though it had no formal association with the university. There were a lot of activities besides: courses of handicrafts, rambles, camping expeditions and involving the membership in the performance of plays. "The Settlement's Little Theatre put on a great variety of productions by the best serious dramatists, with some of whom Freeman corresponded. He never compromised over the quality of the work selected for presentation. Several notable local people, including industrialists, supported the work with donations, and a number of people later active in the public life of the city were associated with the Settlement."

In 1923 Freeman stood as a Labour Parliamentary candidate in the Hallam constituency.

When Freeman retired in 1955 at the age of 69 the Wardenship went to Christopher Boulton, an anthroposophist and lover of theatre. In 1961 the Shipton Street Settlement, along with its Little Theatre, vanished. In its place Christopher Boulton founded a Rudolf Steiner Settlement where the Merlin Theatre and the Arnold Freeman Hall still flourish. The Sheffield Repertory Company also started with the plays its members presented at the Little Theatre before they became independent in 1923.

Arnold Freeman died in 1972.

== Books ==
=== As Arnold Freeman ===
- Who was Rudolf Steiner?: What is anthroposophy? Arnold Freeman A. Freeman (1944) ASIN B0007K7TDY
- RUDOLF STEINER'S MESSAGE TO MANKIND Published by Sussex: New Knowledge Books, 1963
- St. Paul : a play by Arnold Freeman and Rom Landau. Bodley Head, 1938
- Meditation: Under the Guidance of Rudolf Steiner Sheffield educational settlement, 1957
- Thou Eye Among the Blind Sheffield Educational Settlement; 1st edition (1 January 1948) ASIN: B003UV5XJ4
- What Rudolf Steiner Says Concerning Initiation And Meditation Kessinger Pub Co (30 September 2004) ISBN 978-1417949908
- Seasonal Trades by Sidney Webb and Arnold Freeman BiblioBazaar (18 November 2009) ISBN 978-1117137568

=== As Arnold James Freeman ===
- Boy Life & Labour: The Manufacture of Inefficiency University of California Libraries (1 January 1914) ASIN B0065SSH0Q
- The spiritual foundations of reconstruction; a plea for new educational methods by Arnold James Freeman and F H. Hayward. Ulan Press (31 August 2012) ASIN B00B77PUBO
- An introduction to the study of social problems University of California Libraries (1 January 1918) ASIN B006YZTJYS
- Education through settlements by Arnold James Freeman. University of California Libraries (1 January 1919) ASIN B006Z09G7M
- Great Britain After The War (1916) by Sidney Webb and Arnold James Freeman. Kessinger Publishing, LLC (20 March 2009) ISBN 978-1104173593
- Self-observation;: An introduction to Rudolf Steiner's "Philosophy of spiritual activity." Anthroposophical Pub. Co (1956) ASIN: B0007K6CIM
