= Patricia Reiff =

Space physicist

Patricia Hofer Reiff
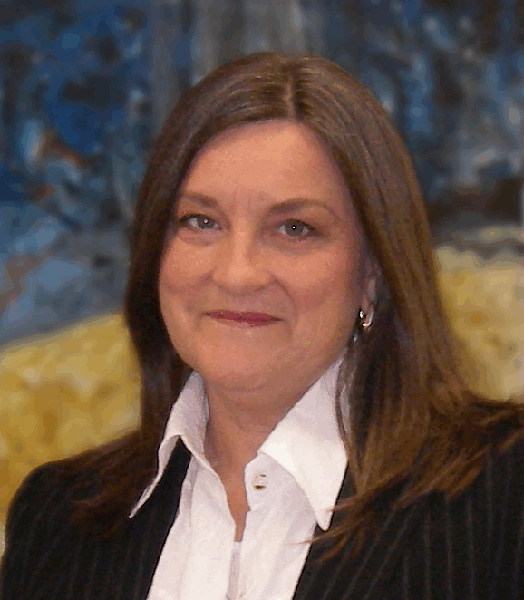
- Born: Patricia Ann Reiff; 1950 (age 75–76); Oklahoma City, United States
- Education: Oklahoma State University (BS); Rice University (MS, PhD)
- Spouse: Thomas Westfall Hill
- Children: 3
- Awards: Fellow, American Geophysical Union (1977), Athelstan Spilhaus Award (2009), AGU SPARC Award (2013), NASA Group Achievement Awards
- Scientific career
- Workplaces: Rice University, NASA
- Thesis: Modification of particle fluxes at the lunar surface by electric and magnetic fields (1975)
- Doctoral advisor: David L. Reasoner
- Other academic advisors: James L. Burch (Post-Doc Advisor)
- Doctoral students: Georgette Burgess, Rudy Frahm, Gang Lu, Loretta Weiss, Shan Xue, C. Ben Boyle, Vance Henize, Menelaos Sarantos, Deirdre Wendel, Ramkumar Balasubramanian, Andrew Marshall, James Webster
- Website: http://reiff.rice.edu

Patricia Reiff (born 1950) is an American space physicist at Rice University, known for her research on space weather and for engaging the public about science.

== Early life and education ==
Reiff is a self-described child of the space age and in a 2019 interview she recalls the excitement of watching Sputnik flying overhead, listening to John Kennedy's speech about going to the Moon, and watching the Apollo 11 liftoff en route to the Moon.

As a child, Reiff loved the outdoors and medicine and initially considered vet medicine as a career option. The movies produced in the Bell System Science Series incited her interest in science, especially The Strange Case of the Cosmic Rays and Hemo the magnificent. Her interest in space science began with a father-daughter course at the Oklahoma City Planetarium while she was a Brownie. In college, she started as a math major and did a summer research experience at Argonne National Laboratory. She started taking classes in astronomy and obtained her B.S. in physics from Oklahoma State University (1971). She moved to Rice University where she earned an M.S. space science in 1974 working on Magnetosheath electrons. In 1975 she finished her Ph.D. in space and astronomy working on Apollo plasma data. From 1975 to 1976, she worked on Atmosphere Explorer data as a National Research Council fellow at Marshall Space Flight Center. As of 2021, she is a professor in physics and astronomy at Rice University.

What I like most about my job is the fact that when you discover or figure something out, for that time you are the ONLY one in the world who knows that!

— Patricia Reiff, Interview with Multiverse

== Career ==
Reiff started graduate school at Rice University in 1971 and immediately learned the computer programming needed to work on data from the Charged Particle Lunar Environment Experiment (CPLEE). In 2019 she described the process of analyzing data that arrived on 7-track tape reels and then, starting with Apollo 15, being able to watch data arriving in real-time. In the years following her Ph.D., Reiff worked on data from multiple missions including the Dynamics Explorer, Polar, IMAGE, and Cluster Missions.

From 1993 until 1998, Reiff served on the NASA Space Science Advisory Committee, and in this role influenced the National Aeronautics and Space Agency (NASA) of the importance of including education and public outreach within science missions. In subsequent years, she worked on the education and outreach teams for multiple missions, including Imager for Magnetopause to Aurora Global Exploration (IMAGE) mission and the Magnetospheric Multiscale Mission (MMS).

Reiff established multiple programs to engage the public in science, including a program on a master of science teaching degree. She develops software that is disseminated to public education groups and these programs have been seen by over a million visitors at 15 museums, and she is particularly focused on people in under-served communities in the American southwest. At the Houston Museum of Science, she worked with Carolyn Sumners on digital shows within planetariums, educational experiences that were ultimately spun off into two commercial ventures. Reiff also engages the public with real-time space weather alerts that provided predictions about aurora viewing. Reiff is a ham radio operator with the call sign W5TAR and has written guidelines to use ham radio to train teachers. Reiff sponsored the United States' first team to the International Astronomy Olympiad.

Reiff served as the editor of solar-planetary news in EOS, the journal of the American Geophysical Union, from 1986 to 1989. In 2000, Reiff was the founding director of the Rice Space Institute.

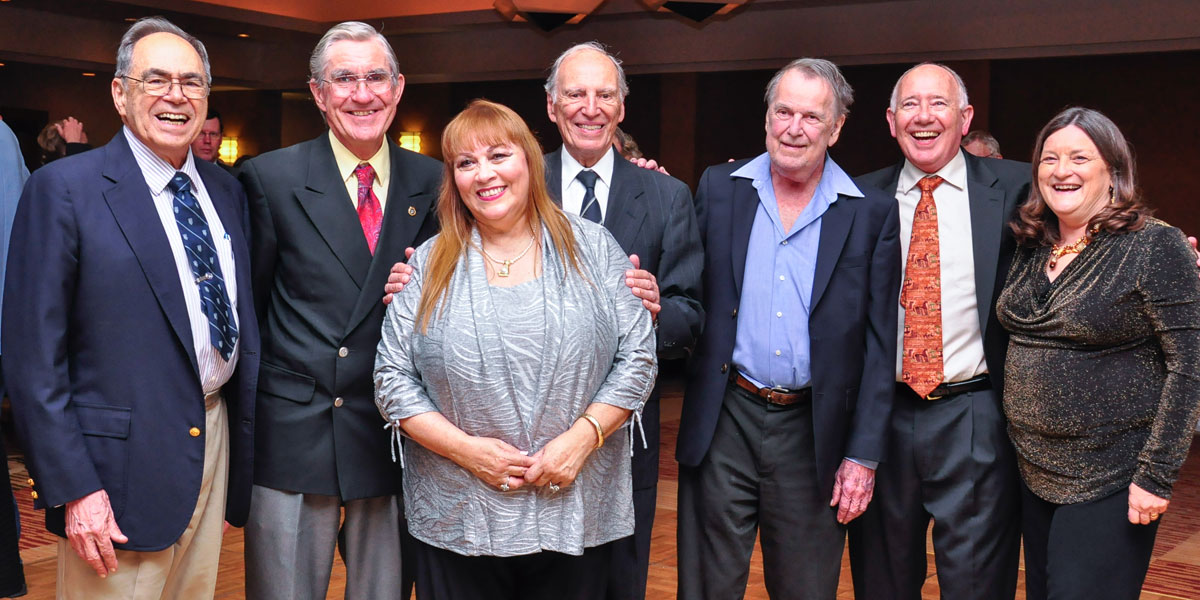
Patricia Reiff (far right) with chairs of the Space Physics and Astronomy Department at Rice University. From left: Alexander J. Dessler, Barry Dunning, Umbelina Cantú (Department Administrator), Ronald F. Stebbings, F. Curtis Michel, Jon Weisheit, Patricia Reiff.

== Research ==
Reiff's research is on magnetospheric physics where she works on the aurora and how the solar wind changes Earth's environment. She used high- and low-altitude spacecraft data to show that auroras are caused by the alignment between an electric field and a magnetic field.

=== Selected publications ===
- Reiff, Patricia H.; Burch, J. L. (1985). "IMF By-dependent plasma flow and Birkeland currents in the dayside magnetosphere: 2. A global model for northward and southward IMF". Journal of Geophysical Research: Space Physics. 90 (A2): 1595–1609. Bibcode:1985JGR....90.1595R. doi:10.1029/JA090iA02p01595. ISSN 2156-2202.
- Harel, M.; Wolf, R. A.; Reiff, P. H.; Spiro, R. W.; Burke, W. J.; Rich, F. J.; Smiddy, M. (1981). "Quantitative simulation of a magnetospheric substorm 1. Model logic and overview". Journal of Geophysical Research: Space Physics. 86 (A4): 2217–2241. Bibcode:1981JGR....86.2217H. doi:10.1029/JA086iA04p02217. ISSN 2156-2202.
- Reiff, P. H.; Spiro, R. W.; Hill, T. W. (1981). "Dependence of polar cap potential drop on interplanetary parameters". Journal of Geophysical Research: Space Physics. 86 (A9): 7639–7648. Bibcode:1981JGR....86.7639R. doi:10.1029/JA086iA09p07639. ISSN 2156-2202.
- Reiff, P. H.; Hill, T. W.; Burch, J. L. (1977). "Solar wind plasma injection at the dayside magnetospheric cusp". Journal of Geophysical Research. 82 (4): 479–491. Bibcode:1977JGR....82..479R. doi:10.1029/JA082i004p00479. ISSN 2156-2202.
- Reiff, P. H.; Spiro, R. W.; Hill, T. W. (1981). "Dependence of polar cap potential drop on interplanetary parameters". Journal of Geophysical Research: Space Physics. 86 (A9): 7639–7648. Bibcode:1981JGR....86.7639R. doi:10.1029/JA086iA09p07639. ISSN 2156-2202.

== Awards and honors ==
- Women on the Move, Texas Executive Women (1990)
- Fellow, American Geophysical Union (1997)
- Aerospace Educator Award, Women in Aerospace (1999)
- NASA Group Achievement Awards:

- GGS Mission (1998)
- IMAGE Mission (2002)

- Athelstan Spilhaus Award, American Geophysical Union (2009)
- Birkeland Distinguished Speaker, University of Oslo (2012)
- Space Physics and Astronomy Richard Carrington Education and Public Outreach Award, American Geophysical Union (2013)
- Inaugural recipient of the Marjorie Corcoran Award, Rice University (2018)
- "Order of the Round Table" (NWC Hall of Fame) (2021)
- "Distinguished Alumnus" (Oklahoma State U, CAS) (2022)
- "Excellence in Outreach" (Wiess School of Natural Science, Rice) (2023)
