= Arnold Cook =

Australian blind academic (1922–1981)

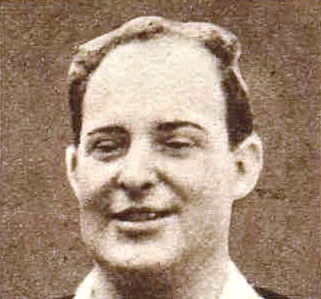
- Cook c. 1950
- Born: 5 May 1922; Narrogin, Western Australia
- Died: 30 June 1981 (aged 59)
- Occupation: Economist

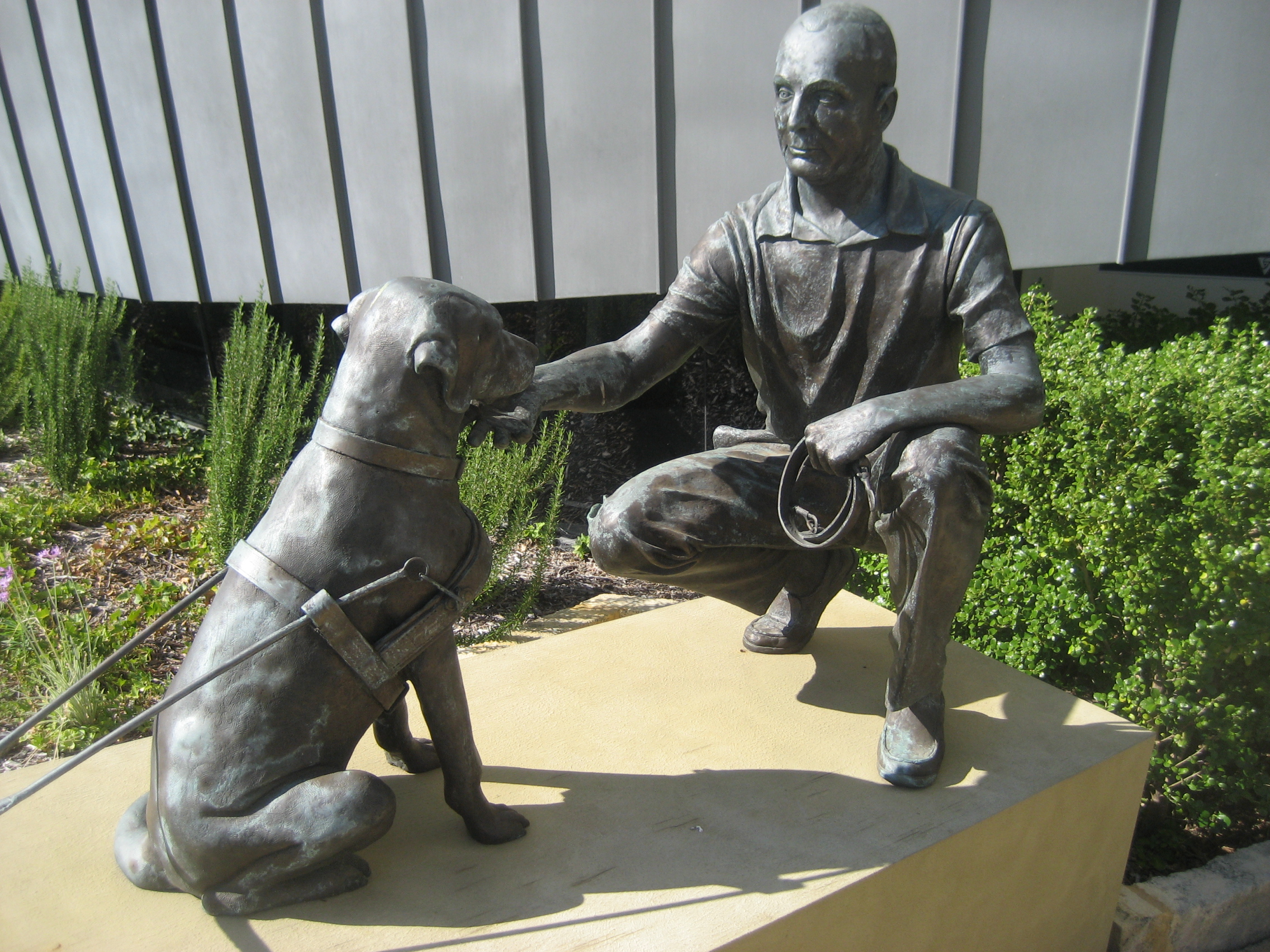
Bronze statue of Dr Cook and his dog Dreena at the Association for the Blind in Victoria Park, Western Australia

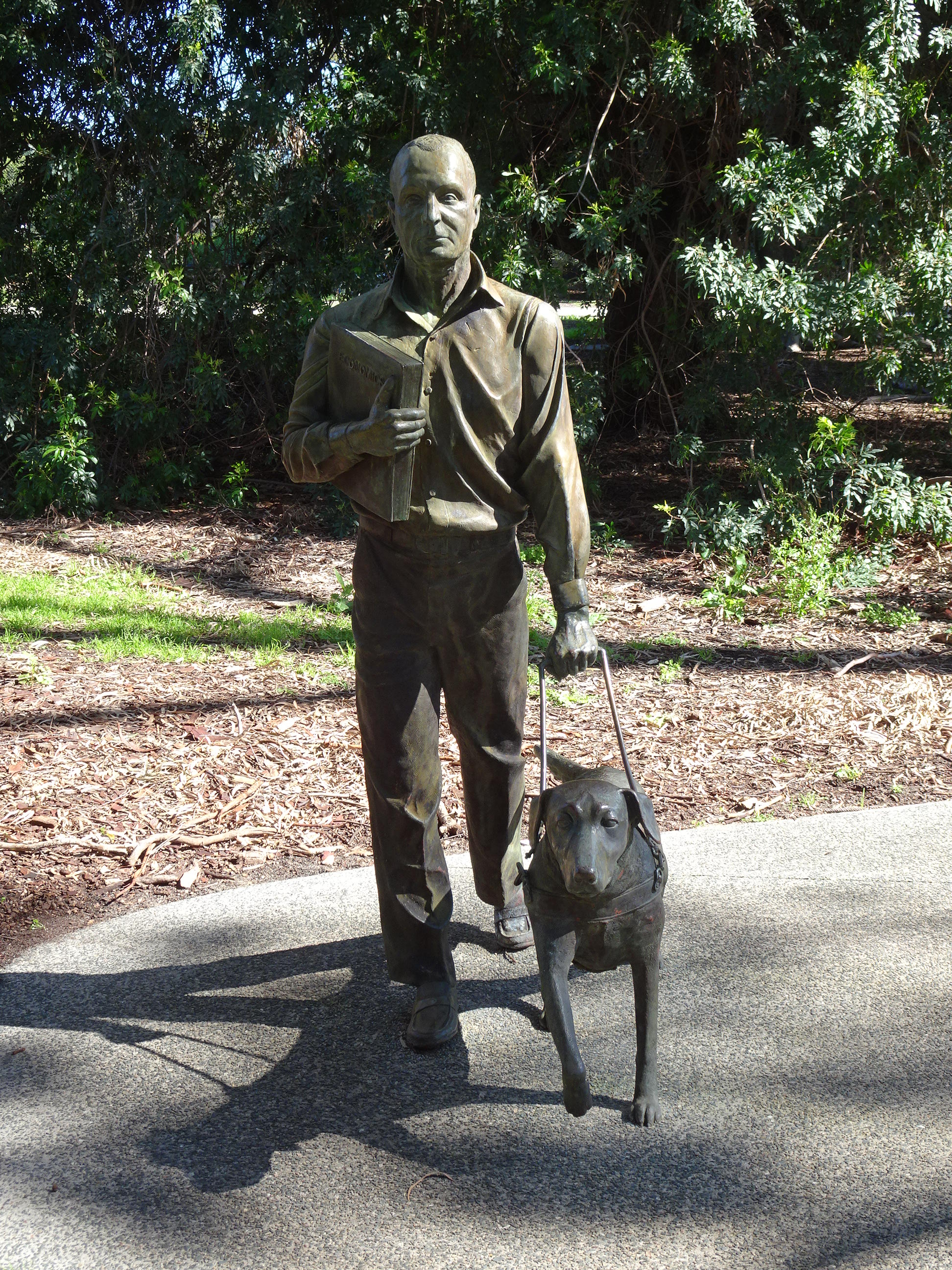
Bronze statue of Dr Cook and his dog Dreena, Kings Park, Perth

Arnold Charles Cook (5 May 1922 – 30 June 1981) was an Australian academic and senior economics lecturer at the University of Western Australia (UWA). He was blind since his teenage years and is noted for, in 1950, bringing the first overseas, professionally trained guide dog to Australia and for being instrumental in establishing the first guide dog training centre in the country.

== Biography ==
Cook was born in Narrogin on 5 May 1922, the first son of Charles Ernest Stanley Cook and Grace Florence Bell. He later lived in Geraldton and was diagnosed with retinitis pigmentosa at the age of 15; he was totally blind by the age of 18.

In 1944 he commenced his Bachelor of Arts, majoring in Economics at the University of Western Australia and graduated with first-class honours in 1947. While at University he met Enid Doreen Fuller and they were married in December 1946. Between 1948 and 1950 he studied at the London School of Economics after winning a UWA Hackett Research Studentship for study abroad valued at £800. A public appeal raised another £600 to assist him and his wife's living expenses.

While in the United Kingdom Cook made contact with the British Guide Dogs for the Blind Association at Leamington Spa from whom he acquired a black Labrador guide dog "Dreena" which he brought back to Perth in August 1950. UWA offered him a position as economics lecturer and Cook and Dreena became familiar, if not novel, sights around the city as they caught public transport between his home in Belmont and the campus at Nedlands. Alexandra Hasluck described Dreena as "... the most famous dog in all Western Australia for a while."

In 1951 Cook helped establish the first guide dog school in Australia in Perth as part of the local Guide Dogs for the Blind Association. In 1957 the organisation expanded into Victoria and ultimately became Guide Dogs Australia.

Cook travelled to the United States on sabbatical to study in 1957 and again in 1965, earning a doctorate at Harvard University in 1961.

As well as being the founder of the Guide Dog Movement in Australia, Cook was the foundation president of the Retinitis Pigmentosa Foundation of Western Australia and patron and foundation president of the Western Australian Guild of Blind Citizens.

He died of a heart attack at his home in Nedlands on 30 June 1981.

In 1985, Cook's societal contribution received recognition through the unveiling of a bronze statue featuring him and his guide dog, Dreena, at the entrance to the Ivy Watson Playground in Kings Park. The statue was a commission from the Western Australian Guild of Blind Citizens. Another statue of the pair was unveiled in 2007 at the offices of the Association for the Blind of Western Australia in Victoria Park. There is also a bust of Cook at Guide Dogs NSW.
