= Edward Aspinwall =

Edward Aspinwall, D.D. (died 1732), was an English polemical divine.

== Life ==
Aspinwall received his education at Cambridge University, and was appointed chaplain to the Earl of Radnor. Afterwards he became sub-dean of the Chapel Royal, and in 1729 was instituted prebendary of Westminster.

Aspinwall died on 3 August 1732.

== Works ==
Aspinwall was the author of a Preservative against Popery, 1715, and an Apology, being a series of Arguments in Proof of the Christian Religion, 1731. The Apology, mainly directed against the deist Anthony Collins, was prefaced by an address 'To all Impartial Freethinkers,' in which Aspinwall articulated his ideal of impartiality:

I have made it my sincere and labour'd concern to divest myself of every bias or influence that interest or blind passion might bring upon me, to the end that my mind, being (I think) perfectly disingag'd from all partial and unworthy motives, might remain absolutely free to determine itself by solid reason in the choice of reveal'd religion.
