= Arnold Murray =

Arnold Murray may refer to:

- Arnold Murray (pastor) (1929–2014)
- Arnold Murray (1854–1952), one of the Last surviving Confederate veterans
- Arnold Murray (1932–1990), lover of Alan Turing, prosecuted for homosexuality
