= Arnold Auerbach =

Arnold Auerbach may refer to:

- Red Auerbach (Arnold Jacob Auerbach, 1917–2006), American basketball coach
- Arnold M. Auerbach (1912–1998), American comedy writer
