= Richard Baron (philosopher) =

British philosopher

Richard Baron (born 1958) is a British philosopher. He was educated at Aylesbury Grammar School and at Selwyn College, Cambridge.

His first book, Projects and Values, argues for a foundationalist virtue ethic, against the background of a structured approach to the cultural relativity of value-concepts and a conception of the human subject that is inspired by Ludwig Wittgenstein.

His second book, Deliberation and Reason, analyses our processes of deliberation. He argues that we have to see ourselves as enjoying a freedom that is incompatible with determinism, in order to support our self-conception as self-directed subjects. He then argues that we can see ourselves as having that kind of freedom if we overlook the causal closure of the physical, and that this vision of ourselves can sit alongside the scientific account of ourselves.

His third book, Confidence in Claims, is an exercise in applied epistemology. It investigates how features of various academic disciplines should affect our confidence in the correctness of claims that experts in the relevant disciplines make.

His fourth book, Epistemic Respectability in History, tackles the problem that many important historical claims are easy to dispute, so that the usual epistemic standard of justification would simply dismiss them as not justified. The book proposes an alternative standard of epistemic respectability.

His fifth book, Accounts and Reality, proposes a way to view the results that are obtained in academic disciplines that is intended to avoid the question of realism without undermining the epistemic status of disciplines.

He has published articles and reviews in Philosophy Now and in the Ethical Record.

He has also had a career as an adviser on tax policy, both for the British Government and for the Institute of Directors.
