= Arnold Kramer =

American painter

Arnold Kramer, Folk Artist

Arnold Kramer (1882–1976) was an American folk artist.

== Early life ==
Arnold Kramer was one of 12 children born to Michael and Gertrude Kramer in Mitchell County, Iowa. In 1891, when Arnold was nine years old, the family moved to a homestead near Seaforth, Minnesota in Redwood County where they farmed. Arnold was a contemporary of children's author Laura Ingalls Wilder who lived near Walnut Grove in southern Redwood County. Arnold married Rose Boushek on June 2, 1914. They raised their four daughters on a farm north of Seaforth. Their only son Myron, died at the age of 13.

== Career ==
Example of Kramer's Work

Arnold Kramer was nicknamed Minnesota's Grandpa Moses by the University of Minnesota during the hey-day of his painting career in the 1960s. A self-taught artist, he completed over 400 pieces in a style referred to as naïve or primitive. His folk art was reminiscent of paintings done by Anna Mary Robertson Moses (1860–1961), another self-taught artist, from New England, whose work is still extremely popular among collectors. Like Grandma Moses, Kramer didn't pick up a paint brush until after retirement when he began recording the history of Midwestern agronomy in primary colors. Arnold began painting and recording history after a visit to see his daughter, Irene. She introduced him to oil paints and canvas to keep him busy while she and Rose went shopping. When Arnold returned to Wabasso, Minnesota he began his career creating his own distinctive work. According to an article in the Saint Paul Pioneer Press, published August 1, 1972, Kramer had shows at the American Swedish Institute in Minneapolis, Dayton's Art Fair, and was part of a traveling art show sponsored by the University of Minnesota. Kramer had also participated in countless rural art shows which produced several scrapbooks full of awards and ribbons. He was also featured in The Farmer magazine.

== Collections ==
CLICK TO VIEW IMAGES PROVIDED BY OWNERS
