= Arndell =

Arndell may refer to:

== People ==
- Arndell Lewis (1897–1943), Australian politician

== Places ==
- Arndell Park, New South Wales, suburb of Sydney, Australia

== Schools ==
- Arndell School, special school in Sydney, Australia
- Arndell Anglican College, day school in Sydney, Australia
