= Arnold Peter Weisz-Kubínčan =

Jewish Slovak painter who died in the Holocaust

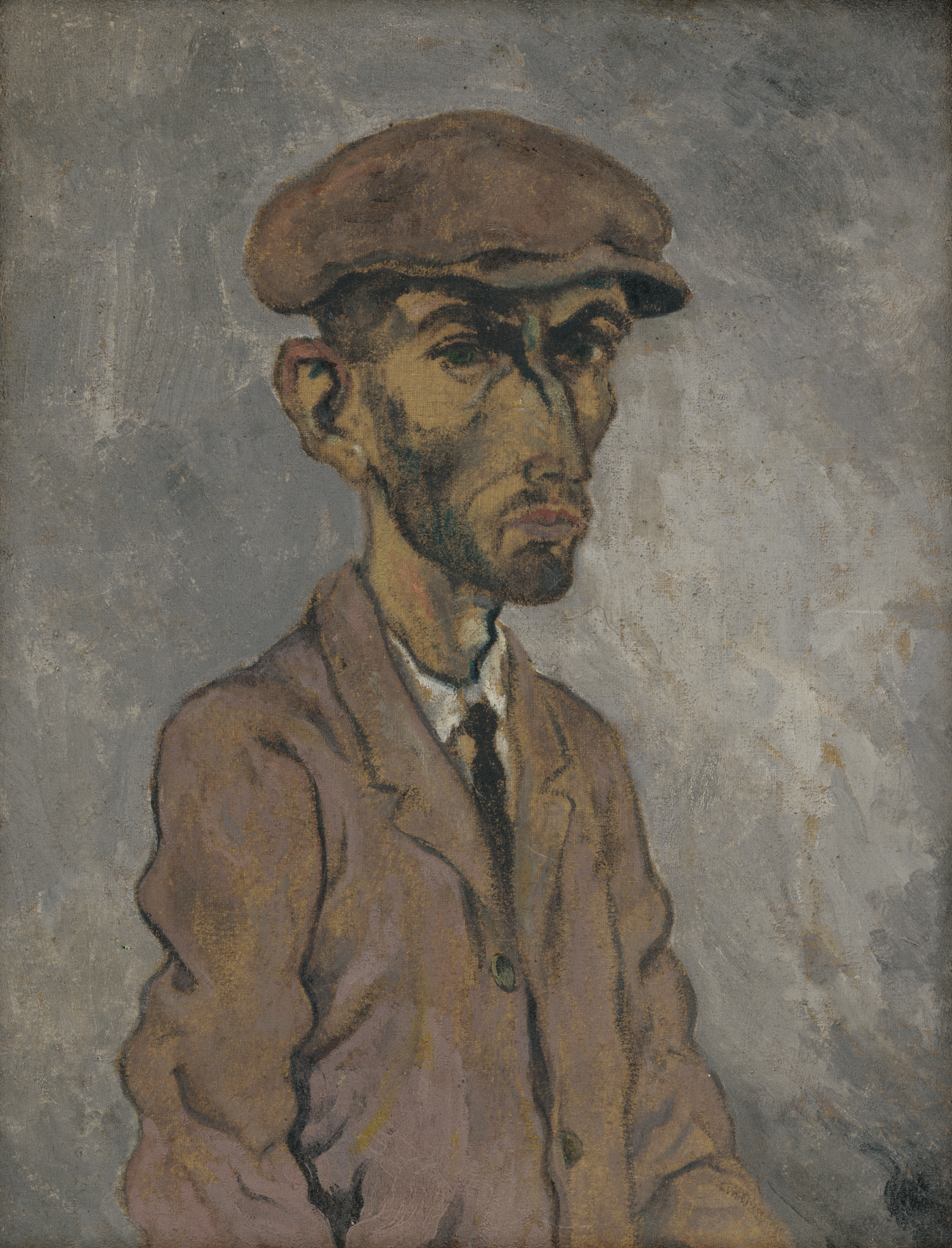
- 1917 self-portrait
- Born: Arnold Weisz; 3 March 1898; Usch, Prussia, German Empire
- Died: 1945 (aged 46–47)
- Partner: Zorka Kahan-Ring (1942-1945)

Arnold Peter Weisz-Kubínčan (3 March 1898 – 1945) was a Jewish Slovak painter. His works, many destroyed during the Holocaust, are considered to be among the most original artistic expressions of the Slovak interwar period.

== Biography ==
He was born Arnold Weisz, to a Jewish family in Ujście, German Empire. When he was a child, his family moved to Dolný Kubín, in what is now Slovakia. From 1913 to 1917, he studied sculpture at the School of Applied Arts in Budapest. In 1917, he interrupted his studies to enlist in the army where he served on the Balkan Front in World War I. The next year, he resumed his studies in Berlin, where he became a part of the Expressionist art movement.

In 1923, he returned to Dolný Kubín, later relocating to Martin in 1934. He began using the name Kubínčan in 1937, and adopted the name Peter after being baptized in 1940. In 1942, many Jews in Martin were taken and deported to concentration camps during the Holocaust in Slovakia. However, Weisz-Kubínčan was able to avoid being captured during this time. While living in Martin, he reconnected with Zorka Kahan-Ring, an old friend, and they entered into a relationship together. The two of them hid in the mountains for two years, until they discovered the bodies of the family who had helped to hide them. They gave themselves up afterwards to prevent anyone else from being killed for helping them.

Before being taken to the concentration camp in 1945, Weisz-Kubínčan placed nearly 300 pieces of his own artwork in a suitcase. He hid the suitcase in the roof of a house in Martin. He told Kahan-Ring of the suitcase's location, bequeathing its contents to her. Weisz-Kubínčan died in 1945, during or shortly after being taken to a concentration camp, possibly Sachsenhausen concentration camp or Mauthausen. Some firsthand accounts by people who knew Weisz-Kubínčan claimed that he died in the camps, while others said that he fell ill and died after being liberated from the camps. Many of Weisz-Kubínčan's works were destroyed during this time.

After being liberated from the concentration camp, Kahan-Ring went to Martin where she retrieved the suitcase of Weisz-Kubínčan's art. She kept it for the rest of her life, bringing it with her to the United States, where Weisz-Kubínčan's art had its first exhibition in 1961. After Kahan-Ring's death, the suitcase and its contents were donated to the Slovak National Gallery by her daughter, the curator Katarina Curtisová.
