= Richard Baron (physician) =

American physician

Richard J. Baron (born June 3, 1953) is the president and CEO of the American Board of Internal Medicine (ABIM) and ABIM Foundation. Baron was chair of the American Board of Internal Medicine's board of directors in 2008–09, a trustee of the ABIM Foundation 2008–13 and a Master of the American College of Physicians.

== Background ==
Before becoming CEO at ABIM, Baron served as group director of seamless care models at the Centers for Medicare & Medicaid Services (CMS) Innovation Center, where he led efforts related to Accountable Care Organizations and advanced models of primary care. Prior to his CMS appointment, Baron, board certified in internal medicine and geriatrics, practiced general internal medicine and geriatrics for almost 30 years in the community in which he lived at Greenhouse Internists, P.C., located in Philadelphia, Pennsylvania. Greenhouse has been a pioneer in the comprehensive adoption of electronic health records in the small-practice environment. Baron also served on the board of the National Quality Forum and their Health Information Technology Advisory Committee, as well as the Standards Committee of the National Committee for Quality Assurance.

Baron served as chief medical officer of Health Partners, a not-for-profit Medicaid HMO set up by four teaching hospitals in Philadelphia, from 1988 to 1996. He was the architect of the Best Clinical and Administrative Practices program, funded by the Robert Wood Johnson Foundation and the Center for Health Care Strategies, working with medical leadership of Medicaid health plans around the country in learning collaboratives to improve the quality of care for their members. This program reached plans serving more than half of the Medicaid managed care population in the United States.

Per tax filings, he earned over $700,000 from the ABIM in 2019. (6)

== Articles and presentations ==
Baron has authored a number of journal articles on medical phenomenology, electronic health records, primary care and meaningful use. He is also a frequently requested speaker on these and other topics, most notably the patient-centered medical home.

== Education ==
Baron received an English degree from Harvard and his medical degree from Yale University. He completed house staff training at New York University-Bellevue Medical Center and served a three-year obligation in the National Health Service Corps in rural Tennessee.
