= Wabasso, Minnesota =

City in Minnesota, United States

Wabasso
- City
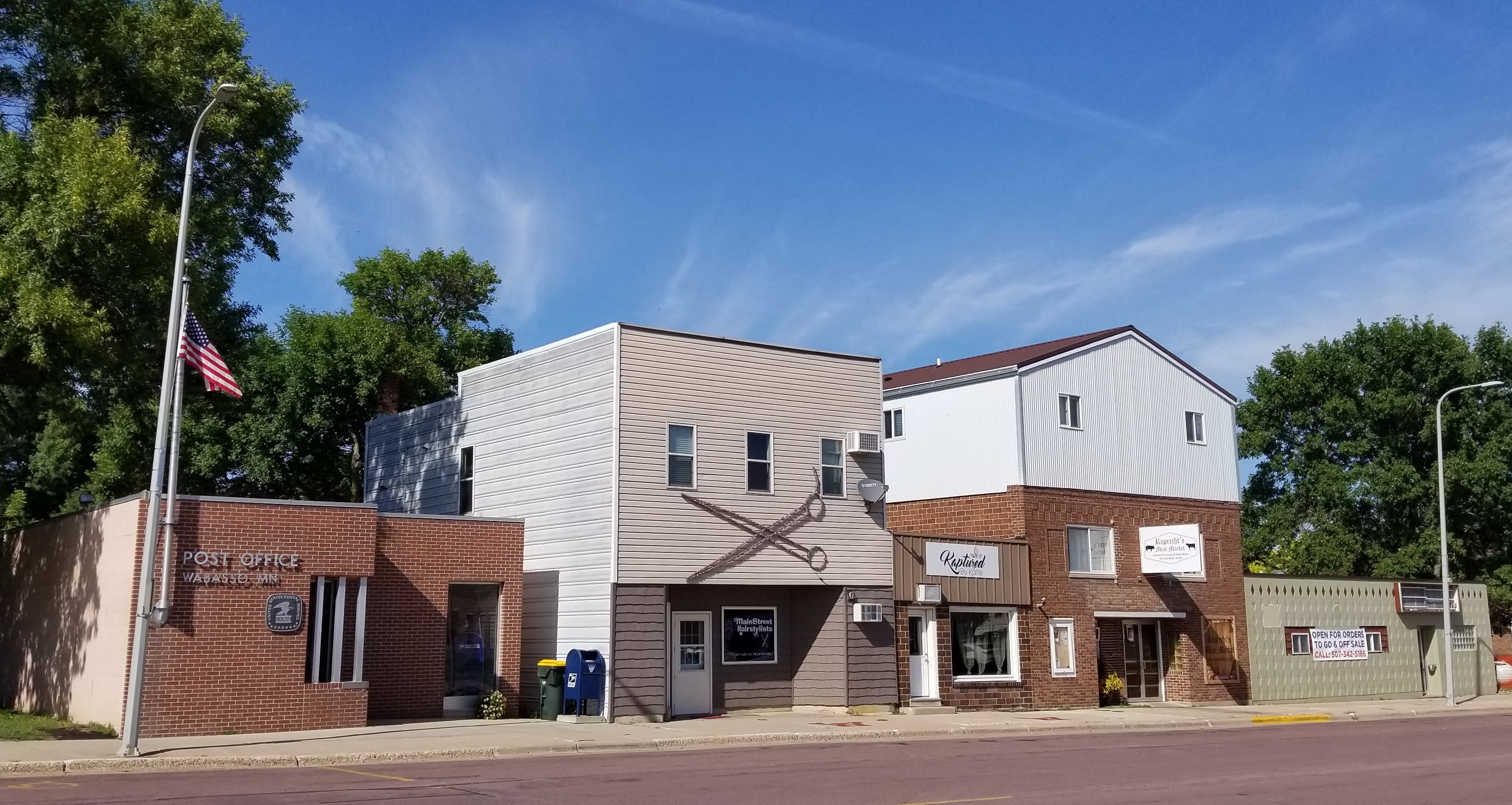
- Buildings on Wabasso's Main Street

- Cities and townships of Redwood County
- Coordinates: 44°24′09″N 95°15′19″W
- Country: United States
- State: Minnesota
- County: Redwood

Area
  - Total: 0.85 sq mi (2.20 km^{2})
  - Land: 0.85 sq mi (2.20 km^{2})
  - Water: 0 sq mi (0.00 km^{2})
- Elevation: 1,079 ft (329 m)

Population (2020)
  - Total: 739
  - Density: 869.0/sq mi (335.53/km^{2})
- Time zone: UTC-6 (Central (CST))
  - Summer (DST): UTC-5 (CDT)
- ZIP code: 56293
- Area code: 507
- FIPS code: 27-67396
- GNIS feature ID: 2397157
- Website: www.wabasso.org

Wabasso (/wəˈbæsoʊ/) is a city in Redwood County, Minnesota, United States. The population was 739 at the 2020 census.

== History ==
Wabasso was platted in 1889. Wabasso is a name derived from ‘waabooz’ (IPA: [waːbʊːs]), the Ojibwe word for “snowshoe hare” or more generally "rabbit". The city was incorporated in 1900. A post office called Wabasso has been in operation since 1900.

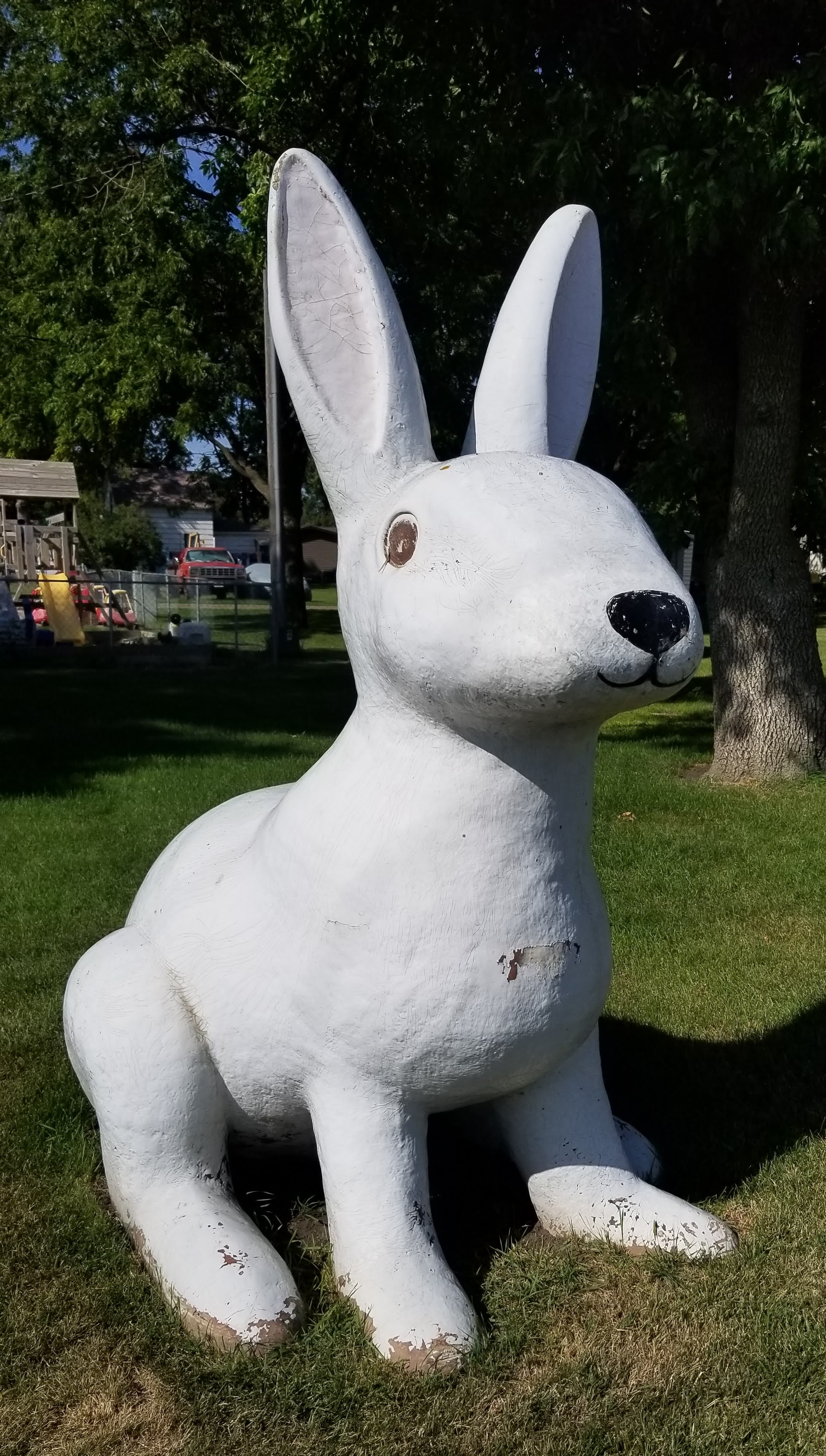
Six-foot tall rabbit sculpture welcoming visitors to Wabasso

== Geography ==
According to the United States Census Bureau, the city has a total area of 0.86 square miles (2.23 km^{2}), all land.

== Demographics ==
Historical population
Census	Pop.	Note	%±
1900	178		—
1910	343		92.7%
1920	459		33.8%
1930	482		5.0%
1940	604		25.3%
1950	693		14.7%
1960	789		13.9%
1970	738		−6.5%
1980	745		0.9%
1990	684		−8.2%
2000	643		−6.0%
2010	696		8.2%
2020	739		6.2%
U.S. Decennial Census

=== 2010 census ===
As of the census of 2010, there were 696 people, 282 households, and 181 families living in the city. The population density was 809.3 inhabitants per square mile (312.5/km^{2}). There were 308 housing units at an average density of 358.1 per square mile (138.3/km^{2}). The racial makeup of the city was 97.4% White, 0.7% African American, 0.3% Native American, 0.4% Asian, 0.4% from other races, and 0.7% from two or more races. Hispanic or Latino of any race were 3.0% of the population.

There were 282 households, of which 29.1% had children under the age of 18 living with them, 50.0% were married couples living together, 9.2% had a female householder with no husband present, 5.0% had a male householder with no wife present, and 35.8% were non-families. 32.6% of all households were made up of individuals, and 17.7% had someone living alone who was 65 years of age or older. The average household size was 2.32 and the average family size was 2.97.

The median age in the city was 43.7 years. 23.3% of residents were under the age of 18; 6.6% were between the ages of 18 and 24; 22.3% were from 25 to 44; 24.6% were from 45 to 64; and 23.1% were 65 years of age or older. The gender makeup of the city was 48.3% male and 51.7% female.

=== 2000 census ===
As of the census of 2000, there were 643 people, 271 households, and 178 families living in the city. The population density was 815.1 inhabitants per square mile (314.7/km^{2}). There were 297 housing units at an average density of 376.5 per square mile (145.4/km^{2}). The racial makeup of the city was 99.4% White, and 0.16% from all other races.

There were 271 households, out of which 31.1% had children under the age of 18 living with them, 56.1% were married couples living together, 5.9% had a female householder with no husband present, and 34.3% were non-families. 31.7% of all households were made up of individuals, and 17.3% had someone living alone who was 65 years of age or older. The average household size was 2.37 and the average family size was 3.02.

In the city, the population was spread out, with 27.7% under the age of 18, 6.2% from 18 to 24, 26.0% from 25 to 44, 18.2% from 45 to 64, and 21.9% who were 65 years of age or older. The median age was 38 years. For every 100 females, there were 93.7 males. For every 100 females age 18 and over, there were 96.2 males.

The median income for a household in the city was $35,972, and the median income for a family was $44,773. Males had a median income of $30,625 versus $20,139 for females. The per capita income for the city was $20,013. About 5.1% of families and 8.0% of the population were below the poverty line, including 11.5% of those under age 18 and 9.1% of those age 65 or over.

== Education ==
Wabasso Public School (K-12)

St. Anne's School (Catholic K-6)

Knowledge Bowl

In 2018 the Wabasso Knowledge Bowl team, nicknamed the Killer Rabbits of Caerbannog in reference to the Monty Python and the Holy Grail character, went to the State Competition, making them the smallest school in the state to ever do so.

== Notable person ==
- Arnold Kramer - Folk artist who lived here as a boy.
