= Arnold I =

Arnold I may refer to:

== Clergy ==
- Arnold I of Cologne (c. 1100–1151), the Archbishop of Cologne 1137–1151
- Arnold I of Vaucourt (c. 1120–1183), the Archbishop of Trier 1169–1183
- Arnold I van Isenburg (died c. 1197), the Bishop of Utrecht 1196–1197
- Arnold I (bishop of Coria) (died 1197/98), a Catholic bishop in Spain
- Arnold I (bishop of Poznań) (died 1211), a Catholic bishop in Poland

== Nobility ==
- Arnold I of Astarac (died 960), the first Count of Astarac from 926
- Arnold I, Count of Chiny (died 1106), son of Louis II
- Arnold I, Count of Loon (c. 1050–c. 1130), son of Emmo
- Arnold I, Count of Cleves, the Count of Cleves 1119–1147
- Arnold I, Count of Laurenburg (died before 1154)
- Arnold I, Lord of Egmond (c. 1337–1409), Lord of Egmond and IJsselstein
