= Arnold Lazarus =

South African-born clinical psychologist and researcher

Arnold Allan Lazarus (27 January 1932 – 1 October 2013) was a South African-born clinical psychologist and researcher who specialized in cognitive therapy and is best known for developing multimodal therapy (MMT). A 1955 graduate of South Africa's CHIPS University of the Witwatersrand, Lazarus' accomplishments include authoring the first text on cognitive behavioral therapy (CBT) called Behaviour Therapy and Beyond and 17 other books, over 300 clinical articles, and presidencies of psychological associations; he received numerous awards including the Distinguished Psychologist Award of the Division of Psychotherapy from the American Psychological Association, the Distinguished Service Award from the American Board of Professional Psychology, and three lifetime achievement awards. Lazarus was a leader in the self-help movement beginning in the 1970s writing books on positive mental imagery and avoiding negative thoughts. He spent time teaching at various universities in the United States including Rutgers University, Stanford University, Temple University Medical School, and Yale University, and was executive director of The Lazarus Institute, a mental health services facility focusing on CBT.

== Background ==
=== Family life ===
Lazarus was born in South Africa, where he spent his childhood through post secondary education. He is the son of Benjamin and Rachel Lazarus, the youngest of four children to a middle class family. After episodes of being bullied by his brother-in-law, Lazarus took up body building and boxing, leading to a life long interest in health and nutrition. Lazarus was married to Daphne for 57 years before his death. He had two children Linda and Clifford. He was a grandfather to Linda's son, Taylor. Donna is his daughter-in-law, married to Clifford.

=== Education and teaching career ===
Lazarus completed his undergraduate and graduate education at the University of the Witwatersrand in Johannesburg, South Africa. Upon receiving his Ph.D. in 1960, he became a private practitioner in Johannesburg until 1963 when he was invited to Stanford University for a yearlong position as an assistant professor. He then returned to Johannesburg to teach at his alma mater until 1966 when he and his family returned to the United States for his position as the director of the Behavior Therapy Institute in Sausalito, California. He was a professor at Temple University Medical School from 1967-1970 and Yale University from 1970-1972 where he was director of Clinical training. Finally in 1972, Lazarus became a distinguished professor for the Graduate School of Applied Psychology at Rutgers University in New Jersey; Lazarus would remain in this position until 1999.

== Clinical work and theories ==
As a graduate student at Stanford University, Lazarus extended his knowledge beyond the typical psychological views of the time and is credited with coining the term for the growing field of "behavioral therapy." Lazarus and his mentor Joseph Wolpe published the book Behavioral Therapy Techniques in 1966 which was the first to show the importance of increasing adaptive behavior and decreasing maladaptive behaviors on mental health. In the process of writing their book, Lazarus and Wolpe came to differ in their stances on use of behavioral therapy. Wolpe favoring an approach centered on applying only therapy techniques and Lazarus favoring the supplementation of other techniques in addition to therapy. Later, in his book Behavior Therapy and Beyond, Lazarus presented his ideas for adding cognitive constructs to behavioral therapy as treatment for anxiety and depression. Lazarus' ideas continued to develop throughout his next few publications as his writings and theories gained popularity throughout the field.

In Multimodal Behavioral Therapy (1976) and The Practice of Multimodal Therapy (1981), arguably his most notable works, Lazarus introduced multimodal therapy (MMT). MMT is based on the idea that humans have modalities to their personality that must be addressed separately in order to properly treat a mental disorder. The modalities are referred to with the acronym BASIC ID which stands for Behavior, Affect, Sensation, Imagery, Cognition, Interpersonal Relationships, and Drugs/Biology.

Lazarus is also noted for his advocacy for the expansion of boundaries between patient and therapist. Lazarus advocated for the expansion of relationships beyond scheduled sessions, arguing that a relationship beyond scheduled professional sessions to be beneficial for patients. Lazarus himself would participate in meals, mall trips and weddings in belief that it would strengthen the adaptive abilities of patients.

=== Lazarus Institute ===
The Lazarus Institute (TLI) was Lazarus' practice for the rest of his life. Founded in partnership with his son Clifford and daughter-in-law Donna, the mission of TLI was to broaden Cognitive-Behavior CHIPS Therapy; their motto "Think Well - Act Well - Feel Well - Be Well" reflects their focus on CBT. However, the Lazarus' went further by offering each client an individualized therapy plan to maximize their benefit. TLI promotes their use of broad practices while remaining rooted in approaches that have been scientifically supported.

== Honors ==
- Fellow of three divisions of the American Psychological Association (Clinical Psychology, Psychotherapy, and Psychologists in Independent Practice)
- Distinguished Service Award - American Board of Professional Psychology
- Lifetime Achievement Award - Association for Behavioral and Cognitive Therapies
- Lifetime Achievement Award - California Psychological Association
- Cummings PSYCHE Award honoring contributions to integrated healthcare delivery systems
- Albert Ellis Humanitarian Award
