= Arnold Payne (cricketer) =

English cricketer (1897–1973)

Arnold Cyril Payne (1897–1973) was an English cricketer active from 1931 to 1934 who played for Northamptonshire (Northants). He appeared in three first-class matches as a wicketkeeper and righthanded batsman. Payne was born in Northampton on 3 October 1897 and died there on 13 February 1973. He scored 27 runs with a highest score of 22 not out and claimed ten victims including three stumpings.
