= Arnold H. Green =

American academic (1940–2019)

Arnold H. Green (July 1940 - July 24, 2019) was a history professor retired from teaching at Brigham Young University, where he specialized in the modern history of the Middle East, especially the eras of European colonization and of decolonization.

== Biography ==
Green was born in July 1940 and grew up in Arcadia, California, where he attended K–12 (1945–57). In 1959 he received an Associate of Arts degree from Citrus Junior College in Azusa. After one year (1959–60) at Brigham Young University, he served a two-and-a-half-year mission for the Church of Jesus Christ of Latter-day Saints (LDS Church) in France, where his assignments included Nantes, Tours, La Rochelle, Troyes, Chatillon, Reims, and Fontenay-aux-Roses. He toured Europe for a month after his release in February 1963.

Green returned to school in the summer of 1963. In 1965 he earned a bachelor's degree "with honors" in American Studies from California State University, Los Angeles, at a time when anti-Vietnam War protests and civil rights marches were growing on U.S. college campuses.

Green received a scholarship to seek an MA in History at BYU, where he worked as a TA for Professor Richard L. Bushman and where his professors included De Lamar Jensen, Russel B. Swensen, and Hugh Nibley. The latter two formed the advisory committee for his research thesis on "A History of Latter-day Saint Proselytizing Efforts to the Jewish People," a summary article of which appeared in BYU Studies (1968). He received the MA "with distinction" late in the spring of 1967.

With his wife and infant daughter, Green returned in the summer of 1967 to Los Angeles, where at UCLA he began pursuing a Ph.D. in modern Near Eastern history/Arabic. His professors included Gustave Von Grunebaum, Nikki Keddie, Stanford Shaw, Afaf Lutfi al-Sayyid Marsot, P. J. Vatikiotis, Louis J. Cantori, Abdallah Laroui, and Peter Von Sivers. He worked during 1969–70 as a research assistant for Prof. Leo Kuper. A Fulbright-Hays grant funded 18 months of research in France and Tunisia (1970–72) for the dissertation on The Tunisian Ulama, 1873–1915: Social Structure and Response to Ideological Currents, which was published by E. J. Brill (Leiden, Netherlands).

During 1972–73, while Andrew Sandler was on sabbatical leave, Green replaced him as a visiting professor at the University of Miami, where he taught courses on the modern Middle East, sub-Saharan Africa, and the Jewish experience.

In the fall of 1973, Green embarked on Fulbright–Hays post-doctoral research scholarship to North Yemen. He anticipated meeting his wife (and their three small children) in Cairo on 6 October 1973, when the "Ramadan"/"Yom Kippur" War broke out, stranding Mrs. Green and the children in Beirut and Dr. Green temporarily in Libya and then in Tunisia. They finally reached Yemen, via Rome and Dhahran, a month after leaving Miami. Living in Taiz, Green studied the medieval "university" town of Zabid.

From 1974 to 1985 Green was in the Department of Arabic Studies at the American University in Cairo where he was an assistant professor and, from September 1977, an associate professor of Arab history.

Green became a member of the BYU faculty in 1985. He has served as the head of the BYU Jerusalem Center and as chair of the BYU history department. He retired from BYU in 2006.

Among books by Green are The Tunisian Ulama, 1873–1915 (1978), which is his most widely cited work, A Survey of Arab History, coauthored with Bernard Weiss, and In Quest of An Islamic Humanism: Arabic and Islamic studies in memory of Mohamed al-Nowaihi (1984).

In the LDS Church, Green served in many callings including as a branch president and a Sunday School president.

Besides studies of North Africa and the Middle East, especially their intellectual history, Green has also studied the use of supposed similarities to Islam to attack the Latter-day Saints in 19th Century American thought. His work considering the comparison of Joseph Smith to Mohammad has been often cited.

== Sources ==
- "Arnold Green's BYU bio page". BYU Department of History. Archived from the original on 3 August 2007.
- Muslim online publication article mentioning Green
