= Arnold Jackson (cricketer) =

English cricketer (1903–1971)

Personal information
- Full name: Arnold Kenneth Jackson
- Born: 23 June 1903; Edgbaston, Warwickshire, England
- Died: 31 May 1971 (aged 67); Halstenbek, Schleswig-Holstein, West Germany
- Batting: Right-handed
- Bowling: Right-arm fast-medium

Domestic team information
- Years: Team
- 1928–1931: Warwickshire

Career statistics
Competition	First-class
Matches	2
Runs scored	5
Batting average	5.00
100s/50s	–/–
Top score	3*
Balls bowled	90
Wickets	–
Bowling average	–
5 wickets in innings	–
10 wickets in match	–
Best bowling	–
Catches/stumpings	–/–
- Source: Cricinfo, 28 December 2011

Arnold Kenneth Jackson (21 June 1903 – 31 May 1971) was an English cricketer. Jackson was a right-handed batsman who bowled right-arm fast-medium. He was born at Edgbaston, Warwickshire.

Jackson made two first-class appearances for Warwickshire against Nottinghamshire at Trent Bridge, Nottingham in 1928, and Kent at the Mitchells and Butlers' Ground, Birmingham in 1931. Jackson had little success in these two matches, scoring a total of 5 runs and bowling a total of fifteen wicketless overs.

He died at Halstenbek, Schleswig-Holstein, West Germany on 31 May 1971.
