= William Arnall =

English political writer

William Arnall (died May 1736) was an English political writer.

== Life ==
He was trained as an attorney, but took to political writing before he was twenty. He was one of the authors in Prime Minister Robert Walpole's pay who replied to the Craftsman and the various attacks of Bolingbroke and Pulteney. He wrote the Free Briton under the signature of "Francis Walsingham", and succeeded Matthew Concanen in the British Journal. The report of the committee of inquiry into Walpole's conduct indicates that in the years 1731-41 over £50,000 for his writing circle, with over £10,997 allocated to Arnall for distribution to other journalists or to meet printing costs. Arnall himself received an annual pension of about £400, making him the best paid government journalist in London.

== Works ==
Besides his writing for Walpole, Arnall also published a number of pamphlets on political and ecclesiastical themes, including Publius Clodius Pulcher and Cicero (1727), One of his tracts, in which he disputes certain claims of the clergy in regard to tithes Animadversions on Bishop Sherlock's Remarks on the Tythe Bill, is reprinted in The Pillars of Priestcraft and Orthodoxy Shaken (2nd edn, 1768). A letter to Dr. Codex [Dr. Gibson] on His Modest Instructions to the Crown (1733), Opposition No Proof of Patriotism (1735) on Thomas Rundle's appointment to the see of Londonderry, and The Complaint of the Children of Israel (1736, under the name Solomon Abrabanel) are attributed to him.

A Letter to the Revd Dr Codex [Edmund Gibson] (1733), Opposition No Proof of Patriotism (1735), The Complaint of the Children of Israel (1736, under the name Solomon Abrabanel), and Animadversions on Bishop Sherlock's Remarks on the Tythe Bill, reprinted in The Pillars of Priestcraft and Orthodoxy Shaken (2nd edn, 1768). In the London Evening Post for 3 June 1736, Arnall's death in May that year is reported.

Arnall's work for Walpole made him a popular target for the Whig opposition Craftsman and Fog's Journal. He was also satirised in verse, Alexander Pope for example attacked him in the Dunciad (Bk. ii. 315), where his name was substituted for Leonard Welsted's in 1735, and in the epilogue to the Satires (Dialogue ii. 129): 'Spirit of Arnall, aid me whilst I lie!'
