= De Lamar Jensen =

American historian

- Born: Idaho, U.S.
- Education: Brigham Young University (BA); Columbia University (MA, PhD)
- Occupation: Historian

De Lamar Jensen is a historian of early modern Europe, and was a faculty member of the history department at Brigham Young University (BYU). He wrote several books on Europe during the Renaissance and Reformation.

== Biography ==
Jensen was born and raised in Idaho. He was a fighter pilot and instructor in World War II. After the war he studied for a year at BYU and then was a physics teacher at a high school in Idaho for a year. He then served a mission for the Church of Jesus Christ of Latter-day Saints in Mexico and Guatemala. It was while serving as a missionary that he decided to shift to studying history. After his mission he returned to BYU and in 1952 earned a BA in history. He then earned an MA and PhD from Columbia University. He then was a professor of history at New York University.

Jensen joined the BYU history department in 1957. In 1979 he was a fellow of the Guggenheim Foundation.

Among Jensen's works are Renaissance Europe: Age of Recovery and Reconciliation, Reformation Europe: Age of Reform and Revolution, Confrontation at Worms: Martin Luther and the Diet of Worms and Diplomacy and Dogmatism: Bernardino de Mendoza and the French Catholic League.

Jensen served on the editorial committee of the Sixteenth Century Journal. He was the editor of Forums in History from 1973 to 1976.

Jensen has written several encyclopedia articles including the one on the Protestant Reformation for the Encyclopedia of Mormonism. He also wrote the foreword to Arnold K. Garr's Christopher Columbus: A Latter-day Saints perspective.

From 1980-1983 Jensen served as the president of the Peru Arequipa Mission. He also served as a senior missionary for the church in Chile. He had also served as a bishop.

Jensen had been granted emeritus status from BYU by 1992 at which time he headed the universities committee in charge of celebration the quinta-centennial of Christopher Columbus' voyage to the Americas. As recently as 2003 Jensen was a participant at a BYU lecture on Latter-day Saint perspectives on world history.

In 2008 the BYU history department established at De Lamar Jensen lectureship in Jensen's honor. In 2017 the BYU history department established the De Lamar Jensen Chair in Early Modern History.

Since being granted emeritus status Jensen has taken up mural painting.
