= Arnold Metzger =

German philosopher (1892–1974)

Arnold Metzger (24 February 1892 – 16 August 1974) was a German philosopher.

== Life ==
Metzger was born in Landau. He was a student of Edmund Husserl. Having served in World War I, and been imprisoned in Siberia, he made his way back to Germany in 1919. On the way he participated in a soldiers' soviet in Brest-Litovsk.

Having left Nazi Germany in 1938, Metzger went to Paris first, then to England. From 1941, he lived in the United States for 20 years, where he met Ernst Bloch and accepted US-citizenship in 1947. In 1952, he returned and took up a teaching position at the Ludwig-Maximilians-Universität München as an honorary professor for philosophy. From 1958, he held German citizenship again.

Metzger died in Bad Gastein, in 1974.

== Works ==
- Phänomenologie und Metaphysik (1933), 2nd ed. Pfullingen 1966.
- Freiheit und Tod (1955), 2nd ed. 1972; English translation (selections) by Ralph Mannheim, 1972.
- Dämonie und Transzendenz, Pfullingen 1964 (lectures read in the USA).
- Phänomenologie der Revolution, posthumously 1979.
- Wir arbeiten im gleichen Bergwerk. Correspondence with Ernst Bloch 1942-1972, ed. Karola Bloch, Ilse Metzger, Eberhard Braun. Ffm 1987
