= Arnold E. Reif =

American academic (1924–2018)

Arnold E. Reif (July 15, 1924 in Vienna, Austria - June 14, 2018) was an American academic who made early contributions to cancer research.

Reif is best known for his 1964 discovery of the first T cell marker, an antigen he later named Thy-1. His Google Scholar H-index is 25. He is the author of 119 publications.

== Books ==
- Immunity and Cancer in Man: An introduction (Immunology series), Dekker, New York, NY, 1975.
- Immunity to Cancer, (with M. S. Mitchell), Academic Press, Orlando, FL, 2012.
- Fighting Smoking: And other causes of lung cancer, Tate Publishing, Mustang, Oklahoma, 2016.
