= Arno (name) =

Male given name and family name

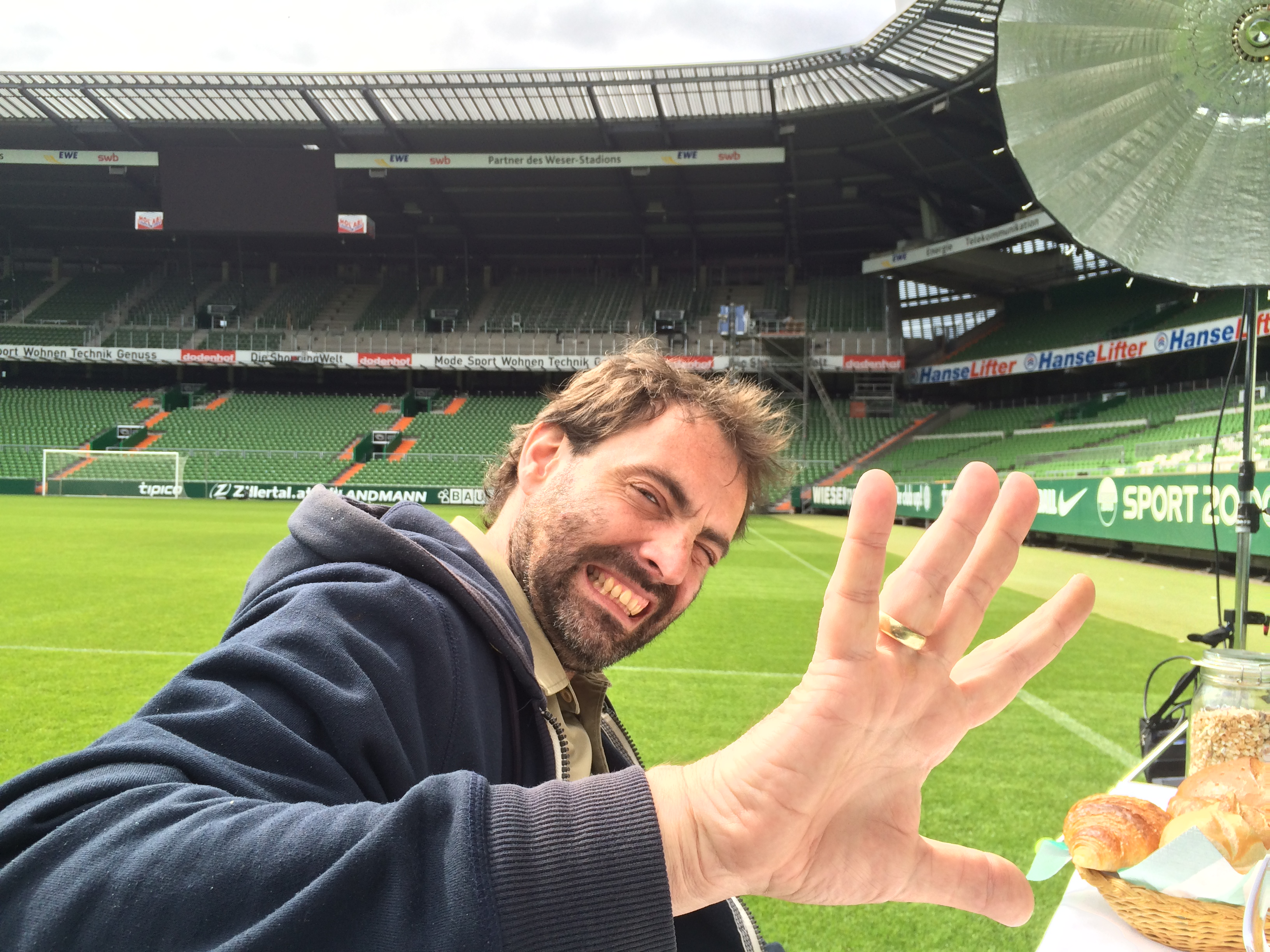
Arno Meinen

Arno (/ˈɑːrnoʊ/; German: [ˈaʁno]) is both a surname and a Germanic given name. Notable people with the name include:

== People with the given name ==
- Arno of Salzburg (c. 750–821), Archbishop of Salzburg also known as Arn or Aquila
- Arno von Endsee (died 892), Bishop of Würzburg

=== Academics ===
- Arno Gruen (1923–2015), Swiss-German psychologist and psychoanalyst
- Arno Kuijlaars (born 1963), Dutch mathematician
- Arno Lustiger (1924–2012), German historian and author
- Arno J. Mayer (1926–2023), Luxembourg-born American historian
- Arno Motulsky (1923–2018), German-born American pharmacologist and genomicist
- Arno Allan Penzias (1933–2024), German-born American physicist, radio astronomer and Nobel laureate
- Arno Peters (1916–2002), German historian, known for the Peters world map
- Arno Poebel (1881–1958), German Assyriologist
- Arno Schirokauer (1899–1954), German-Jewish literary scholar
- Arno Ros (born 1942), German philosopher
- Arno Villringer (born 1958), German neurologist
- Arno Arthur Wachmann (1902–1990), German astronomer

=== Arts ===
- Arno (singer) (1949–2022), stage name of Belgian singer Arno Hintjens
- Arno Assmann (1908–1979), German actor, film director and television writer
- Arno Babajanian (1921–1983), Armenian composer and pianist
- Arno Bornkamp (born 1959), Dutch classical saxophonist
- Arno Camenisch (born 1978), Swiss writer
- Arno Breker (1900–1991), German sculptor
- Arno Carstens (born 1972), South African singer-songwriter
- Arno Cost (born 1986), stage name of Vadim Arnaud Constentin, French musician, DJ and producer
- Arno Fischer (1927–2011), German photographer
- Arno Frey (1900–1961), German actor in Hollywood
- Arno Frisch (born 1975), Austrian actor
- Arno Gasteiger (born 1962), Austrian-born New Zealand photographer
- Arno Geiger (born 1968), Austrian novelist
- Arno Greeff, South African actor
- Arno Holz (1863–1929), German naturalist poet and dramatist
- Arno Jordaan, South African pop singer
- Arno Karlen (1937–2010), American poet, psychoanalyst, and popular science writer
- Arno Liiver (1954–2026), Estonian actor
- Arno Marsh (1928–2019), American jazz saxophonist
- Arno Menses, Dutch rock singer and guitarist
- Arno Rafael Minkkinen (born 1945), Finnish photographer in the US
- Arno Mohr (1910–2001), German painter and graphic artist
- Arno Morales (born 1993), Filipino actor
- Arno Nadel (1878–1943), Jewish musicologist, composer, playwright, poet, and painter
- Arno Paduch, German cornett player and conductor
- Arno Paulsen (1900–1969), German film actor
- Arno Rink (1940–2017), German painter
- Arno Santamaria (born 1978), French singer-songwriter
- Arno Schmidt (1914–1979), German author and translator
- Arno Suislep (born 1981), Estonian singer
- Arno Surminski (born 1934), German writer
- Arno Suurorg (1903–1960), Estonian actor

=== Government, military, and religion ===
- Arno Anthoni (1900–1961), Finnish lawyer, director of the State Police
- Arno Doerksen (born 1958), Canadian politician
- Arno Esch (1928–1951), German liberal politician in the Soviet Occupation Zone
- Arno C. Gaebelein (1861–1945), American Methodist minister
- Arno Jahr (1890–1943), German Wehrmacht general
- Arno Kompatscher (born 1971), Italian politician, president of South Tyrol
- Arno Lamoer, South African police commissioner
- Arno von Lenski (1893–1986), German general and East German politician
- Arno H. Luehman (1911–1989), United States Air Force general
- Arno Rutte (born 1972), Dutch VVD politician
- Arno Sild (born 1947), Estonian politician
- Arno Voss (1821–1888), German-American military commander, lawyer, and politician

=== Sports ===
- Arno Almqvist (1881–1940), Finnish colonel and modern pentathlete
- Arno Bertogna (born 1959), Australian association football player
- Arno Bieberstein (1884–1918), German swimmer
- Arno Botha (born 1991), South African rugby player
- Arno Breitmeyer (1903–1944), German sport official
- Arno Claeys (born 1994), Belgian footballer
- Arno del Curto (born 1956), Swiss ice hockey player and coach
- Arno Ehret (born 1953), West German handball player
- Arno Glockauer (1888–1966), German gymnast
- Arno den Hartog (born 1954), Dutch field hockey player
- Arno Havenga (born 1974), Dutch water polo player
- Arno Hesse (1887–?), German middle-distance runner
- Arno Jacobs (born 1977), South African cricketer
- Arno Klaassen (born 1979), Dutch bobsledder
- Arno Klasen (born 1967), German racecar driver
- Arno Kozelsky (born 1981), Austrian footballer
- Arno Lietha (born 1998), Swiss ski mountaineer
- Arno Neumann (1885–1966), German footballer
- Arno Pijpers (born 1959), Dutch football coach
- Arno Poley (born 1991), South African rugby player
- Arno Rossini (born 1957), Swiss football manager
- Arno Saarinen (1884–1970), Finnish gymnast
- Arno Steffenhagen (born 1949), German footballer
- Arno Strohmeyer (born 1963), Austrian fencer
- Arno Van de Velde (born 1995), Belgian volleyball player
- Arno van Wyk (born 1994), South African rugby player
- Arno Verschueren (born 1997), Belgian footballer
- Arno Wohlfahrter (born 1964), Austrian cyclist
- Arno Wallaard (1979–2006), Dutch cyclist
- Arno van Zwam (born 1969), Dutch footballer
- Arno van der Zwet (born 1986), Dutch track cyclist

=== Other people ===
- Arno Benzler, German World War I flying ace
- Arno Berg (1890– 1974), Swedish-Norwegian architect and antiquarian
- Arno B. Cammerer (1883–1941), American director of the U.S. National Park Service
- Arno H. Denecke (1916–1993), American jurist
- Arno Funke (born 1950), German extortionist
- Arno Kopecky, Canadian journalist and travel writer
- Arno Nickel (born 1952), German correspondence chess Grandmaster
- Arno Schmidt (born c. 1935), Austrian chef and food critic
- Arno Zude (born 1964), German chess master and problemist

=== Fictional characters with the given name ===
- Arno, titular character in a comic strip by André Juillard and Jacques Martin
- Arno, a character in the movie Uncut Gems
- Arno Blunt, antagonist in the book Artemis Fowl: The Eternity Code.
- Arno Brandner, fictional character on German soap opera Verbotene Liebe (Forbidden Love)
- Arno Victor Dorian, a French-Austrian Assassin and the protagonist of Assassin's Creed Unity.
- Arno Stark, Marvel Comics character known as Iron Man 2020
- Arno, a character in Logical Journey of the Zoombinis.
- Arno the Moose, a character from the Reader Rabbit series.

== People with the surname ==
- Alice Arno, stage name of Marie-France Broquet (born 1946), French actress and model
- Audrey Arno (1942–2012), German singer and actress
- Bob Arno, Swedish-born American pickpocket entertainer and criminologist
- Christian Arno (born 1978), British businessman
- Diana Arno (born 1984), Estonian model and fashion designer
- Ed Arno (1916–2008), American cartoonist
- Ferdinando Arnò (born 1959), Italian composer, record producer, and arranger
- Madame Arno, Parisian artist and fighter
- Nelly Arno (1892–1966), British actress
- Peter Arno (1904–1968), American cartoonist
- Robert Arno, engineer
- Sig Arno (1895–1975), German-Jewish film actor

== See also ==
- Arno (disambiguation)
- Arno (god), a river god
