= Claeys =

Claeys is a Dutch/Flemish surname, derived from the given name Nicholas. Bearers of the name include:

== People ==
- Alain Claeys (born 1948), French politician
- Alice Sue Claeys (born 1975), American-Belgian figure skater
- Arno Claeys (born 1994), Belgian footballer
- Dimitri Claeys (born 1987), Belgian cyclist
- Geoffrey Claeys (born 1974), Belgian football player
- Gregory Claeys (born 1953), British historian
- J. R. Claeys, American politician from Kansas
- Joseph Claeys, American politician from Kansas
- Kevin Claeys (born 1988), Belgian cyclist
- Philip Claeys (born 1965), Belgian politician and Member of the European Parliament for Flanders
- Rob Claeys (born 1987), Belgian footballer
- Roger Claeys (1924–2016), Belgian football player
- Tracy Claeys (born 1968), American football coach

== See also ==
- Claeys (company), Belgian combine manufacturer
- Claeys Formula, formula used in Belgium to evaluate the notice period when an employee is dismissed
