= Joe Thornton =

Canadian ice hockey player (born 1979)

- Hockey Hall of Fame, 2025
- Thornton in 2026
- Born: July 2, 1979 (age 47) London, Ontario, Canada
- Height: 6 ft 4 in (193 cm)
- Weight: 220 lb (100 kg; 15 st 10 lb)
- Position: Centre
- Shot: Left
- Played for: Boston Bruins; HC Davos; San Jose Sharks; Toronto Maple Leafs; Florida Panthers
- National team: Canada
- NHL draft: 1st overall, 1997; Boston Bruins
- Playing career: 1997–2022

Joseph Eric Thornton (born July 2, 1979) is a Canadian former professional ice hockey centre. He played for the Boston Bruins, San Jose Sharks, Toronto Maple Leafs and Florida Panthers of the National Hockey League (NHL). He was selected first overall by the Bruins in the 1997 NHL entry draft and went on to play seven seasons with the club, three as its captain. During the 2005–06 season, he was traded to the Sharks. Splitting the campaign between the two teams, he received the Art Ross and Hart Memorial Trophy as the league's leading point-scorer and most valuable player, respectively, becoming the only player in NHL history to win either award in a season played for multiple teams and the only player to date to win either award as a Shark. Thornton went on to play another 14 seasons with the Sharks, including four seasons as team captain and a run to the 2016 Stanley Cup Finals. Thornton was the last active NHL player and the last big 4 North American sports player to have played in the 1990s.

Thornton's on-ice vision, strength on the puck, deft passing ability and power forward style of play led to him becoming one of the league's premier centres and playmakers. He is widely regarded as one of the best passers of all time, and he is one of only 14 players with 1,000 NHL assists. His nickname "Jumbo Joe" is a nod to his large stature and to Jumbo the elephant, who died in St. Thomas, Ontario, where Thornton was raised. Thornton was inducted into the Hockey Hall of Fame in 2025.

== Playing career ==
=== Amateur career ===
Thornton grew up playing minor hockey in his hometown of St. Thomas, Ontario, for the St. Thomas Travellers. He played "AA" hockey for the Travelers minors and in peewee won an Ontario Minor Hockey Association (OMHA) championship in 1992–93. His Bantam year was the first for the newly created "AAA" Elgin-Middlesex Chiefs organization, and Thornton joined the "AAA" Elgin-Middlesex Chiefs of the Minor Hockey Alliance of Ontario for the 1993–94 season. The creation of this organization led to the St. Thomas Minor Hockey Association to compete at the "A" level. During his bantam year, he appeared in six games for the Junior B St. Thomas Stars of the Ontario Hockey Association (OHA), scoring eight points in six games as a 14-year-old. The following season, Thornton joined the Stars full-time and reeled off 104 points over 50 games as a 15-year-old, and was subsequently drafted second overall in the 1995 OHL draft to the Sault Ste. Marie Greyhounds behind Daniel Tkaczuk, who was selected by the Barrie Colts.

Beginning in 1995–96, Thornton began a two-year career in the Ontario Hockey League (OHL) with the Greyhounds. He posted a 76-point season in his first year, earning both OHL and CHL Rookie of the Year honours. The following season, Thornton improved to 41 goals and 122 points, second overall in League scoring behind Marc Savard of the Oshawa Generals, and was named to the OHL second All-Star team.

=== Professional (1997–2022) ===
==== Boston Bruins (1997–2005) ====
After his second OHL season, Thornton was selected first overall in the 1997 NHL entry draft by the Boston Bruins. Thornton suffered a fractured arm in the Bruins' pre-season but made their roster for the 1997–98 campaign. He scored his first career NHL goal on December 3, 1997, in a 3–0 win against the Philadelphia Flyers. Bruins head coach Pat Burns was measured in his deployment of Thornton, using him almost exclusively on the fourth line and making him a regular healthy scratch. Averaging eight minutes and five seconds of ice time per game over the course of the season, he registered three goals and seven points in 55 games as a rookie. In the 1998 Stanley Cup playoffs, Thornton went scoreless in six games.

In 1998–99, Thornton saw significantly more ice time, averaging 15 minutes and 20 seconds per game, and improved to 41 points in 81 games, as well as a 9-point effort in 11 playoff games.

Thornton continued to build into a key player in the Bruins' line-up, increasing his points total in each of the following two campaigns. Prior to the 2002–03 season, he was named team captain, succeeding Jason Allison, who was traded to the Los Angeles Kings in 2001; the captaincy position was vacant for a full season after Allison's departure. In his first season as team captain, Thornton recorded 68 points over 66 games. The following year, he notched his first career 100-point season with 36 goals, a career-high, and 65 assists. He ranked third in NHL point-scoring, behind Peter Forsberg of the Colorado Avalanche and Markus Näslund from the Vancouver Canucks.

Thornton's production declined to 73 points in 77 games in the 2003–04 campaign. He suffered a fractured right cheekbone in a fight with New York Rangers centre Eric Lindros during a game on January 19, 2004. The two power forwards fought after Lindros cross-checked Thornton in the head. The injury required surgery, keeping him out of the line-up for three games. The 2003–04 campaign also saw a drop in Thornton's goal-scoring production that has never since rebounded; his last 30-goal season came during the 2002–03 season.

During the 2004–05 NHL lock-out, Thornton went abroad to play for HC Davos of the Swiss National League A (NLA). He played on a line with fellow NHL players Rick Nash and Niklas Hagman, helping HC Davos to win the League championship and the Spengler Cup. Nash and Thornton have subsequently kept in contact with HC Davos and their longtime coach Arno del Curto; Thornton returned to train with the club for up to a month each summer.

Ahead of the NHL resumption in 2005–06, Thornton became a restricted free agent in summer 2005. Negotiations on a new contract were strained: Thornton was reportedly unhappy with the direction of the Bruins franchise, and upset with criticism of his play in the Bruins' early playoff exit in 2004. Boston's front office was apparently unhappy with Thornton's leadership style and for not raising his level of play during the playoffs. Nevertheless, Thornton re-signed with Boston on August 11, 2005, to a three-year, $20 million contract.

Thornton began the 2005–06 season strongly (33 points in 24 games), making him the team's leading scorer by a substantial margin, but the Bruins were struggling in the standings.

==== San Jose Sharks (2005–2020) ====
On November 30, 2005, Thornton was traded to the San Jose Sharks in exchange for forwards Marco Sturm, Wayne Primeau and defenceman Brad Stuart. Mike O'Connell, the Bruins general manager who traded Thornton, stated in June 2011 that he "would still make the trade", and that it was "satisfying" that Boston had won the Stanley Cup before Thornton's new team had. Despite O'Connell's stance, the trade is widely considered to be a lopsided deal in favor of the Sharks. Upon arriving in San Jose, Thornton improved the Sharks' fortunes and found instant chemistry with winger Jonathan Cheechoo. During the absence of usual alternate captain Alyn McCauley from the San Jose line-up, Thornton donned the "A" for the first time as a Shark in a game against the Phoenix Coyotes on March 30, 2006, and wore the "A" whenever McCauley was out of the line-up for the remainder of the season. Tallying 92 points in 58 games with the Sharks after the trade, Thornton finished the season with 29 goals, a league-leading 96 assists and 125 points total to earn the Art Ross Trophy as the league's top scorer. He became the first player to win the award while splitting the season between two teams. Due to Thornton's success, Cheechoo also enjoyed a career-season, winning the Rocket Richard Trophy as the NHL's top goal-scorer with 56 goals. However, in the 2006 playoffs, Thornton was once again criticized for his play, as his production decreased to two goals and seven assists for nine points in 11 games as the Sharks were ousted in the second round by the eighth seeded Edmonton Oilers. In the off-season, Thornton was honoured for his regular season play and was awarded the Hart Memorial Trophy as the league' regular season MVP to go with his Art Ross Trophy. He is the only player in NHL history to win the Hart Trophy while playing for two different teams in the same season.

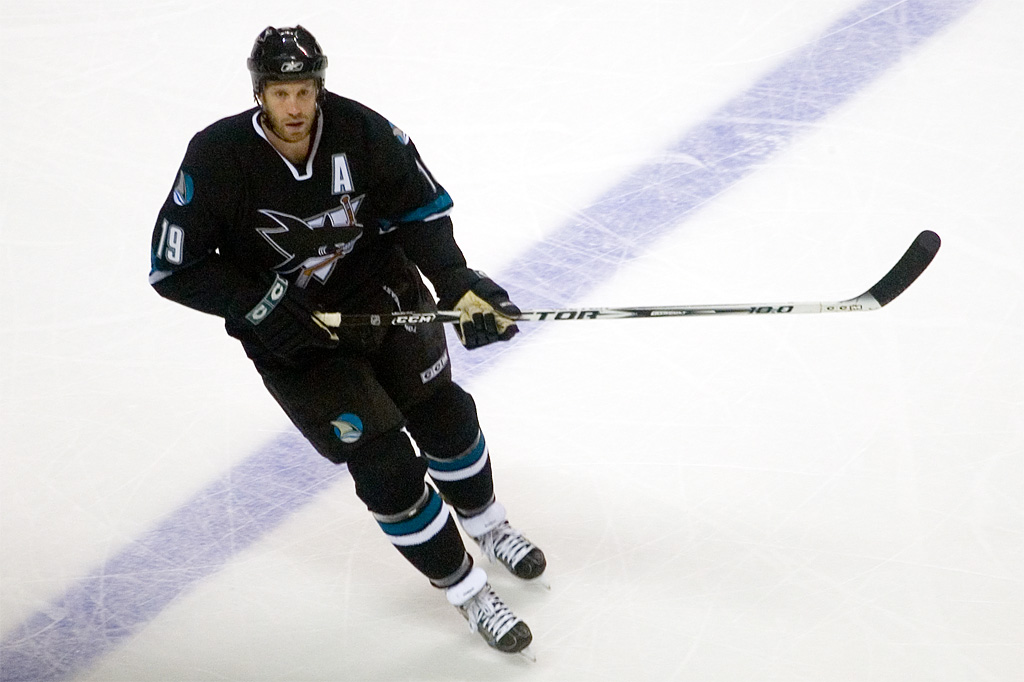
Thornton with the Sharks in October 2006

Thornton began the 2006–07 season being awarded a permanent alternate captaincy, but struggled in the first half of the season while suffering from a toe injury that did not heal until January 2007. After recovering, Thornton enjoyed a productive second half, battling Pittsburgh Penguins centre Sidney Crosby for a second-consecutive scoring title late in the year, eventually finishing six points behind Crosby with 114. With a league-leading 92 assists, Thornton became only the third player in NHL history to record back-to-back 90-assist seasons, joining Wayne Gretzky and Mario Lemieux. Thornton began the 2007 playoffs by recording six assists in the Sharks' first-round series against the fourth-seeded Nashville Predators, who the Sharks upset in five games. Advancing to the second round against the top-seeded Detroit Red Wings, he recorded a goal and three assists in the first three games of the series. However, Thornton was effectively neutralized by Red Wings defenceman Nicklas Lidström, for the remainder of the series as the Sharks were eliminated in six games. Thornton ended the playoffs with a goal and 10 assists for 11 points in all 11 games.

In the 2007 off-season, Thornton signed a three-year contract extension worth US$21.6 million. In the 2007–08 season, the Sharks finished as the second seed in the West and Thornton finished with 96 points (29 goals and 67 assists) all 82 games to finish fifth in NHL scoring and first on the Sharks. He also recorded two goals and eight assists for 10 points in all 13 playoff games in the 2008 playoffs, which saw the Sharks defeat the seventh-seeded Calgary Flames in seven games before falling in six games against the fifth-seeded Dallas Stars.

In 2008–09, Thornton was named captain of the Western Conference for the 2009 NHL All-Star Game in Montreal. He completed the season with 86 points (25 goals, 61 assists) to help the Sharks win the Presidents' Trophy as the regular season champions. In the 2009 playoffs, he recorded a goal and four assists in six games as the Sharks were upset in six games in the first round by the eighth-seeded Anaheim Ducks.

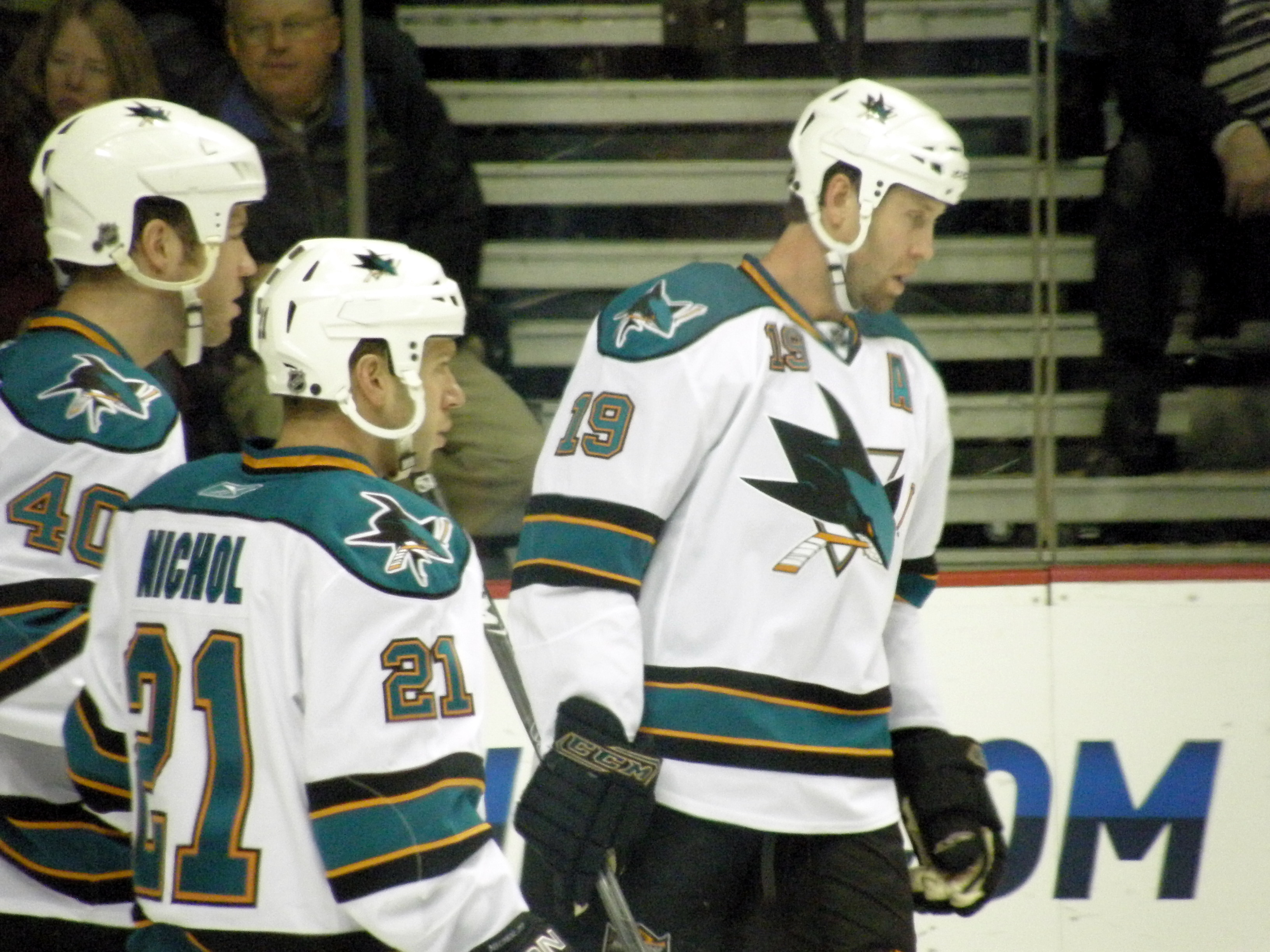
Thornton (centre background) with Kent Huskins (left background) and Scott Nichol (foreground), in February 2010.

In September 2009, before the start of the 2009–10 season, the Sharks acquired Dany Heatley in a three-player trade with the Ottawa Senators that sent Thornton's struggling former linemate Jonathan Cheechoo, along with left-winger Milan Michálek and a second-round draft pick to the Ottawa Senators. Thornton, Heatley, and Patrick Marleau were joined on the Sharks' top line and enjoyed immediate offensive success together. The trio helped the Sharks to one of their best-ever regular seasons in franchise history. Although the line's production slowed down in the second half of the season, all three Sharks players finished in the League's top 15 in point-scoring. Thornton's 89 points ranked eighth, while Marleau and Heatley finished 14th and 15th in League scoring with 83 and 82 points, respectively. The Sharks entered the 2010 playoffs as the top seed in the Western Conference for the second-consecutive year and the Presidents' Trophy runner-up behind the Washington Capitals. After advancing past the eighth-seeded Colorado Avalanche in six games and fifth-seeded Detroit Red Wings in five games in the first two rounds, the Sharks were eliminated by the second-seeded and eventual Stanley Cup champion Chicago Blackhawks in the Western Conference Finals in a four game sweep. Thornton finished the playoffs with a career-high 12 points (three goals, nine assists) in all 15 games.

After the elimination, team management vacated all the Sharks' captaincy positions, including Thornton's role as one of the alternate captains. Prior to the 2010–11 season, he was chosen to replace the retiring Rob Blake as the eighth captain in team history on October 7, 2010. Nine days later, he signed a three-year, US$21 million contract extension with the Sharks. Near the start of the 2010–11 season, Thornton scored the fourth hat-trick of his NHL career in a 5–2 win over the New Jersey Devils. On November 6, Thornton was suspended two games for a controversial hit to the head against St. Louis Blues forward David Perron. Perron missed the remaining 72 games of the 2010–11 season due to post-concussion syndrome. He returned after missing 97 games over 13 months (394 days) on December 3, 2011. Later in the campaign, Thornton eclipsed Marleau as the Sharks' all-time leader in assists. Thornton scored his 1,000th career point with a goal in a game against the Phoenix Coyotes on April 8, 2011. In the first round of the 2011 playoffs, Thornton scored the series-winning goal in overtime of Game 6 against the seventh-seeded Los Angeles Kings to advance the Sharks to the second round where they would meet the third-seeded Detroit Red Wings for the second consecutive season and defeat them in seven to clinch a second consecutive appearance in the Western Conference Finals where the Sharks would fall to the Presidents' Trophy-winning Vancouver Canucks in five games. Thornton ended the playoffs with three goals and a career-high 14 assists and career-high 17 points in all 18 games. A day after the Sharks' Game 5 loss against the Canucks that resulted in their elimination from the playoffs, it was revealed that Thornton had sustained a separated shoulder three days earlier in Game 4 as a result of a shoulder-to-shoulder hit from Canucks' forward Raffi Torres and played there entire playoffs with a broken finger he originally sustained in a 6–0 shutout win over the Dallas Stars on March 31 as a result of a slash from Stars’ defenceman Stéphane Robidas.

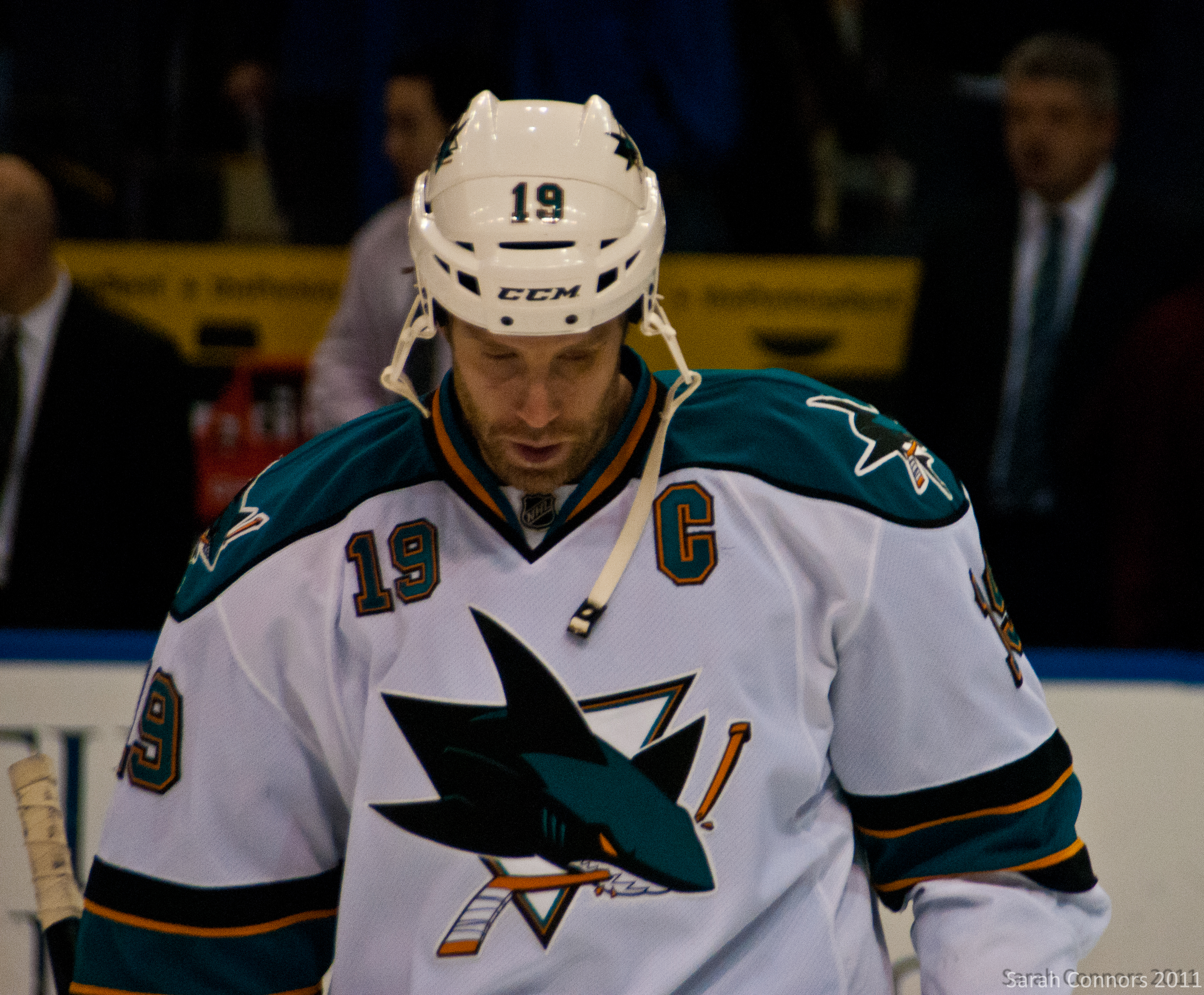
Thornton with the Sharks in December 2011

On January 24, 2014, Thornton signed a three-year contract extension with the Sharks through to the 2016–17 season.

At the end of the 2013–14 season, Thornton ranked 46th on the all-time points leaders (1,194) and 24th on the all-time assist leaders (852) for the NHL. He also became the San Jose Sharks' all-time leader in assists with 567. Thornton finished the 2013–14 season with 11 goals and 65 assists as the Sharks amassed 111 points, just six short of their franchise's all-time-high mark, and were among the favourites to win the Stanley Cup. Facing their in-state rival Los Angeles Kings in the first round of the 2014 playoffs, the Sharks won the first three games in the series. However, the eventual Stanley Cup champion Kings won the next four games and became just the fourth team in NHL history to win a playoff series in seven games after initially trailing three games to none. Thornton finished the playoffs with just two goals and an assist for three points in all seven games.

On August 20, 2014, Sharks head coach Todd McLellan announced that Thornton had been stripped of his captaincy and that the Sharks would start the 2014–15 season without a captain. Joe Pavelski was eventually named Sharks' captain at the start of the 2015–16 season.

On January 26, 2015, Thornton recorded his 1,300th career point during a game against the Colorado Avalanche with his assist on a Joe Pavelski goal, Thornton's second assist of the game. Thornton is the 33rd player in NHL history to reach 1,300 points. Thornton recorded 16 goals and 49 assists during the 2014–15 season as the Sharks failed to qualify for the Stanley Cup playoffs for the first time since 2003.

Thornton finished the 2015–16 season with 19 goals and 63 assists for 82 points in 78 contests as the Sharks returned to the playoffs after a one-year slump. In the 2016 playoffs, the Sharks beat the Los Angeles Kings in the first round in five games, avenging a previous loss to them two years earlier. In the second round, they defeated the Nashville Predators in seven games and advanced to the Conference Finals for the first time since 2011, where the Sharks defeated the St. Louis Blues in six games to advance to the Stanley Cup Finals for the first time in franchise history. This was also Thornton's first time playing in the Finals in his career. However, the Sharks lost to the Pittsburgh Penguins in six games in the Finals. Thornton finished fifth in playoff points with 21 and second in playoff assists with 18. At the end of the season, Thornton was named a Second-Team All-Star for the 2015–16 season.

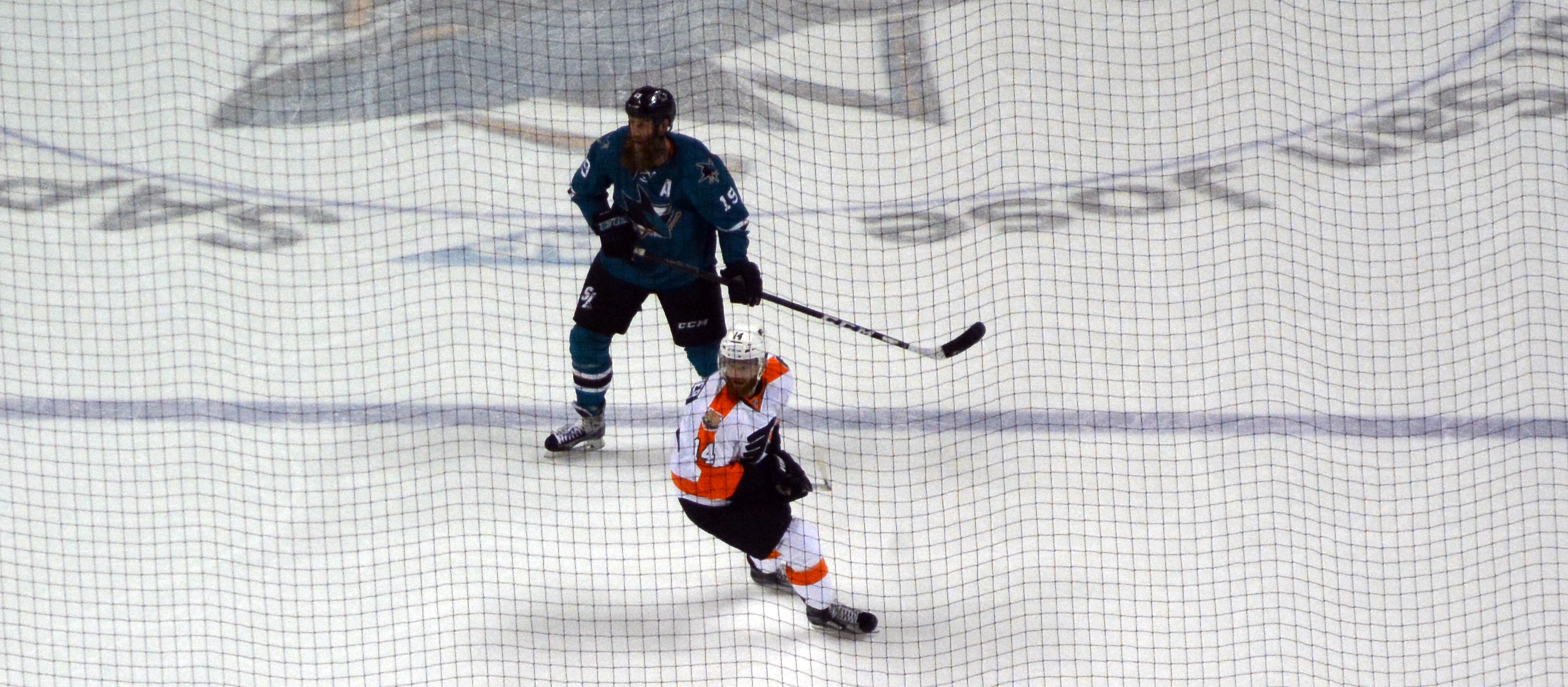
Thornton during a game against the Philadelphia Flyers in December 2016

On March 6, 2017, in a game against the Winnipeg Jets, Thornton recorded his 1,000th NHL assist on a Joe Pavelski goal, becoming the 13th player in NHL history to reach the milestone.

On July 1, 2017, Thornton signed a one-year contract to return to the Sharks for the 2017–18 season. In January 2018, Thornton injured his ACL and MCL and missed the remainder of the season recovering from surgery.

On July 2, 2018, his 39th birthday, Thornton signed a one-year contract to return to the Sharks for the 2018–19 season. On November 13, he scored his 400th career goal against the Nashville Predators to go along with 1,500 games played and 1,000 assists. As of 2018, this feat has only been achieved by six other players in NHL history. On February 11, 2019, in a 7–2 win over the Vancouver Canucks, Thornton passed Gordie Howe for ninth place on the NHL all-time assists list. Thornton and the Sharks reached the Western Conference Finals, though they were eliminated by the eventual Stanley Cup champion St. Louis Blues in six games. Thornton put up four goals and six assists for 10 points in all 19 games during the playoffs.

Thornton signed a one-year, $2 million contract extension on September 6, 2019, to remain with the Sharks. He recorded his 1,500th career point on February 4, 2020, in a 3–1 win over the Calgary Flames. Thornton expressed dissatisfaction with not being traded to a playoff contending team after the February 24 trade deadline to give him the opportunity to chase the Stanley Cup, as had happened with longtime teammate Patrick Marleau. The Sharks posted a disappointing record this season and did not make the playoffs for the first time since 2015 even with the playoff format being expanded and the regular season ending three weeks early due to the COVID-19 pandemic in North America.

==== Toronto Maple Leafs (2020–2021) ====
With the 2020–21 season delayed due to the ongoing COVID-19 pandemic, Thornton returned to HC Davos of the National League on October 15, 2020, for a third stint. Having held Swiss citizenship since 2019, he did not count against the import limit.

On October 16, 2020, Thornton signed a one-year, $700,000 contract with the Toronto Maple Leafs. As his usual jersey number 19 was already in use on the team by Jason Spezza, Thornton switched to wear number 97. Thornton was offered number 19 by Spezza, but declined it. On December 14, 2020, Thornton left Davos to return to Toronto for the start of training camp. On January 16, 2021, Thornton scored his first goal as a Maple Leaf. On January 22, 2021, Thornton suffered a fractured rib after getting hit by Edmonton Oilers forward Josh Archibald. Thornton returned to the lineup on February 27, recording 20 points (5 goals, 15 assists) in 44 games. Thornton scored one goal in the Maple Leafs' seven-game series loss to the Montreal Canadiens in the first round of the 2021 playoffs.

==== Florida Panthers (2021–2022) ====
On August 13, 2021, Thornton returned for his 24th NHL season, signing a one-year, $750,000 contract with the Florida Panthers. Thornton played 34 games and scored a career-low 10-points as the Panthers won the Presidents' Trophy as the regular season champions.

==== Retirement ====
Thornton went unsigned for the entirety of the 2022–23 season and start of the 2023–24 season, however there was speculation he could return to the ice. On October 28, 2023, 18 days into the 2023–24 season, Thornton officially announced his retirement via social media.

At the time of his retirement, Thornton was 12th in league history in total points scored, seventh in assists, and sixth in games played. During his career he won the Hart Trophy (2005), the Art Ross (2005), a gold medal for Team Canada (2010), appeared in six NHL All Star games, and appeared in the NHL Playoffs 19 times.

On January 17, 2024, the Sharks announced their plans to retire Thornton's no. 19 jersey during the 2024–25 season. The Sharks held a weekend-long celebration for Thornton's retirement. The festivities included a proclamation at San Jose City Hall declaring November 23 Joe Thornton Day in both San Jose, and his hometown of St. Thomas Ontario, a Sharks legends game at Tech CU Arena with Thornton's former teammates, and a ceremony to officially retire his no. 19 Jersey prior to the start of a game against the Buffalo Sabres on November 23, 2024.

On June 24, 2025, Thornton was voted to be inducted into the Hockey Hall of Fame in his first year of eligibility.

== International play ==
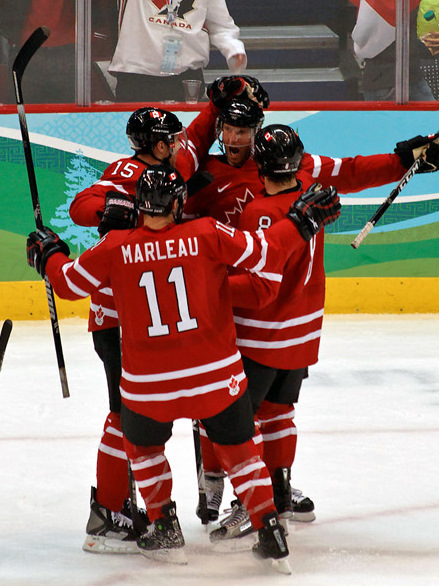
- Thornton (second from right) celebrates a goal during the 2010 Winter Olympics as his San Jose teammates Patrick Marleau (#11) and Dany Heatley (#15) join in, as well as Drew Doughty (#8)

Medal record

Men's ice hockey

Representing Canada

Olympic Games
Gold medal – first place	2010 Vancouver	Team

World Championships
Silver medal – second place	2005 Austria	

Canada Cup / World Cup
Gold medal – first place	2004 Toronto	
Gold medal – first place	2016 Toronto	

World Junior Championships
Gold medal – first place	1997 Switzerland	

Thornton was named to Canada's national under-20 team for the 1997 World Junior Championships in Switzerland. At 17 years old, he recorded four points in seven games, helping Canada to a gold medal. Two years later, he made his debut with the Canadian men's team at the 2001 World Championships in Germany. Thornton collected a goal and an assist over six games, as Canada was eliminated in the quarter-finals by the United States.

Thornton's next international appearance occurred at the 2004 World Cup. Established by then as a premier player in the NHL, Thornton tied for third in tournament scoring with six points (a goal and five assists) over six games. He notched two assists in the championship game against Finland, helping Canada to a 3–2 win. At the 2005 IIHF World Championship in Austria, Thornton led all scorers with 16 points (six goals and ten assists) in nine games and was named tournament MVP. Canada advanced to the gold medal game, where they were shut-out 3–0 by goaltender Tomáš Vokoun of the Czech Republic.

Thornton made his first appearance in the 2006 Winter Olympics. He recorded three points as Canada was shut out in three of six games, losing to Russia in the quarterfinals. Four years later, he was again chosen to Canada's Olympic team for the 2010 Winter Games in Vancouver. Thornton was joined by his Sharks linemates Dany Heatley and Patrick Marleau, as well as Sharks defenceman Dan Boyle, on the squad. The offensive trio of Sharks played on the same line in the Olympics, as well. Thornton registered a goal and an assist over seven games, helping Canada to a gold medal finish.

Thornton was later invited to the Canada's hockey camp for the 2014 Winter Olympics, but did not attend due to his son being hospitalized with an illness. He was named to the Canadian roster for the 2016 World Cup of Hockey held in Toronto.

Thornton was named Team Canada's co-general manager for the 2023 Spengler Cup.

== Personal life ==
Thornton is married to Tabea Pfendsack, whom he met while playing in Switzerland during the 2004–05 NHL lockout. The couple have a daughter and a son. Born in St. Thomas, Ontario, Thornton became a naturalized American citizen in July 2009 at a ceremony in Campbell, California, a suburb of San Jose; he later also received a Swiss passport. Joe and former Sharks teammate Scott Thornton are first cousins.

== In popular culture ==
The Tragically Hip lead vocalist Gord Downie's song "You Me and the B's" (from his 2017 solo album Introduce Yerself) includes a lament about Thornton's poorly-received trade from the Bruins to the Sharks in 2005.

== Career statistics ==
=== Regular season and playoffs ===
Bold indicates led league

			Regular season					Playoffs
Season	Team	League	GP	G	A	Pts	PIM	GP	G	A	Pts	PIM
1993–94	St. Thomas Stars	WOHL	6	2	6	8	2	—	—	—	—	—
1993–94	Elgin-Middlesex Chiefs	OMHA	67	83	85	168	45	—	—	—	—	—
1994–95	St. Thomas Stars	WOHL	50	40	64	104	53	—	—	—	—	—
1995–96	Sault Ste. Marie Greyhounds	OHL	66	30	46	76	53	4	1	1	2	11
1996–97	Sault Ste. Marie Greyhounds	OHL	59	41	81	122	123	11	11	8	19	24
1997–98	Boston Bruins	NHL	55	3	4	7	19	6	0	0	0	9
1998–99	Boston Bruins	NHL	81	16	25	41	69	11	3	6	9	4
1999–00	Boston Bruins	NHL	81	23	37	60	82	—	—	—	—	—
2000–01	Boston Bruins	NHL	72	37	34	71	107	—	—	—	—	—
2001–02	Boston Bruins	NHL	66	22	46	68	127	6	2	4	6	10
2002–03	Boston Bruins	NHL	77	36	65	101	109	5	1	2	3	4
2003–04	Boston Bruins	NHL	77	23	50	73	98	7	0	0	0	14
2004–05	HC Davos	NLA	40	10	44	54	80	14	4	20	24	29
2005–06	Boston Bruins	NHL	23	9	**24**	**33**	6	—	—	—	—	—
2005–06	San Jose Sharks	NHL	58	20	**72**	**92**	55	11	2	7	9	12
2006–07	San Jose Sharks	NHL	82	22	**92**	114	44	11	1	10	11	10
2007–08	San Jose Sharks	NHL	82	29	**67**	96	59	13	2	8	10	2
2008–09	San Jose Sharks	NHL	82	25	61	86	56	6	1	4	5	5
2009–10	San Jose Sharks	NHL	79	20	69	89	54	15	3	9	12	18
2010–11	San Jose Sharks	NHL	80	21	49	70	47	18	3	14	17	16
2011–12	San Jose Sharks	NHL	82	18	59	77	31	5	2	3	5	2
2012–13	HC Davos	NLA	33	12	24	36	43	—	—	—	—	—
2012–13	San Jose Sharks	NHL	48	7	33	40	26	11	2	8	10	2
2013–14	San Jose Sharks	NHL	82	11	65	76	32	7	2	1	3	8
2014–15	San Jose Sharks	NHL	78	16	49	65	30	—	—	—	—	—
2015–16	San Jose Sharks	NHL	82	19	63	82	54	24	3	18	21	10
2016–17	San Jose Sharks	NHL	79	7	43	50	51	4	0	2	2	0
2017–18	San Jose Sharks	NHL	47	13	23	36	38	—	—	—	—	—
2018–19	San Jose Sharks	NHL	73	16	35	51	20	19	4	6	10	6
2019–20	San Jose Sharks	NHL	70	7	24	31	34	—	—	—	—	—
2020–21	HC Davos	NL	12	5	6	11	4	—	—	—	—	—
2020–21	Toronto Maple Leafs	NHL	44	5	15	20	14	7	1	0	1	2
2021–22	Florida Panthers	NHL	34	5	5	10	10	1	0	0	0	0
NHL totals			1,714	430	1,109	1,539	1,272	187	32	102	134	134
NL totals			85	27	74	101	127	14	4	20	24	29

=== International ===
Year	Team	Event	GP	G	A	Pts	PIM
1997	Canada	WJC	7	2	2	4	0
2001	Canada	WC	6	1	1	2	6
2004	Canada	WCH	6	1	5	6	0
2005	Canada	WC	9	6	10	16	4
2006	Canada	OLY	6	1	2	3	0
2010	Canada	OLY	7	1	1	2	0
2016	Canada	WCH	6	1	1	2	2
Junior totals			7	2	2	4	0
Senior totals			40	11	20	31	12

== Awards ==
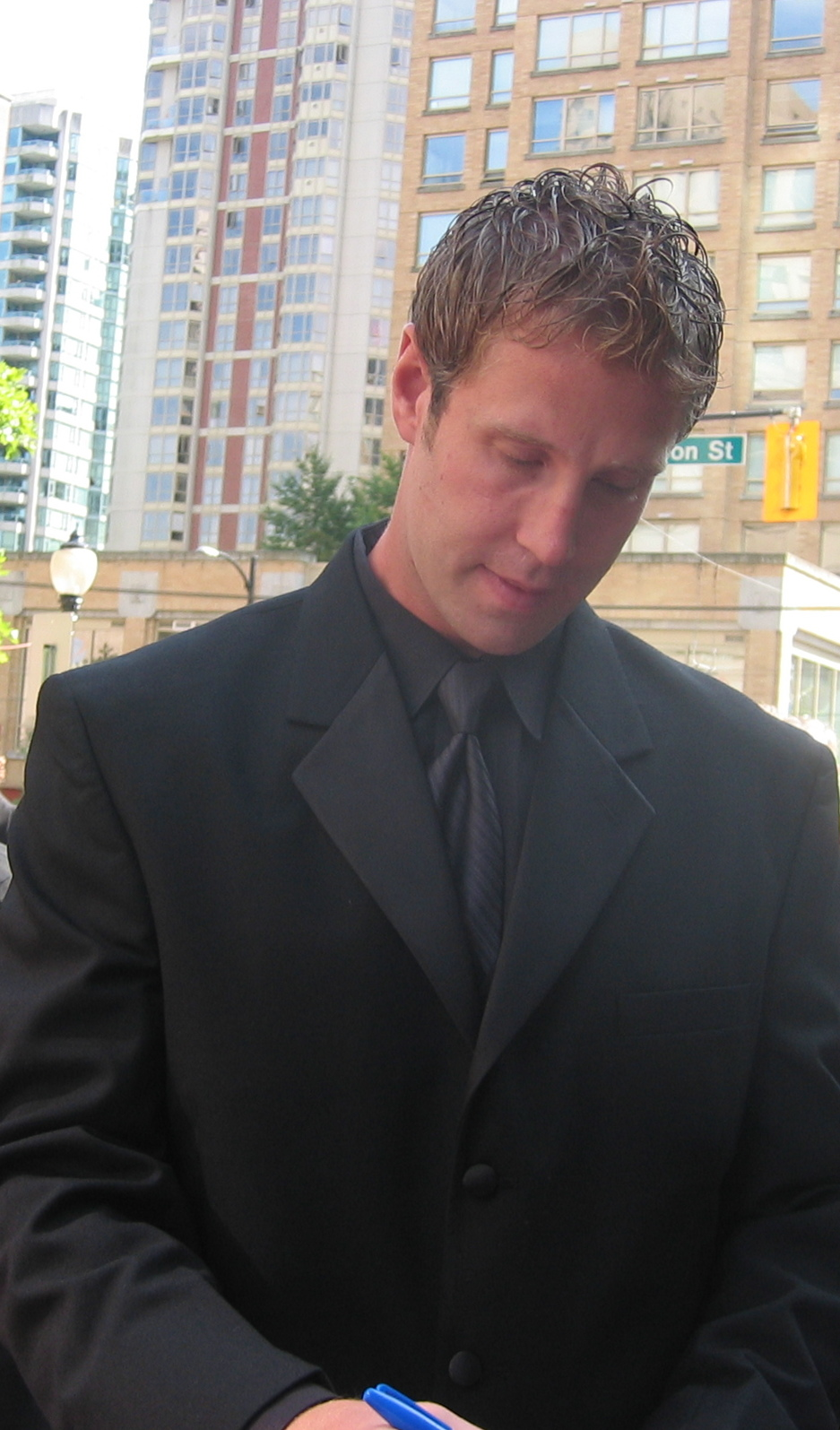
Thornton at the 2006 NHL Awards ceremony

Major junior

- Named to the OHL All-Rookie Team in 1996.
- Won the Emms Family Award as OHL rookie of the year in 1996.
- Named the CHL Rookie of the Year in 1996.
- Named to the OHL second All-Star team in 1997.

NHL

- Played in the National Hockey League All-Star Game in 2002, 2003, 2004, 2007, 2008 and 2009 (captain).
- Won the Art Ross Trophy in 2006.
- Won the Hart Memorial Trophy in 2006.
- Named to the NHL first All-Star team in 2006.
- Named to the NHL second All-Star team in 2003, 2008 and 2016.
- NHL 2K cover athlete - 2007

SUI

- Won the Spengler Cup with HC Davos in 2004.
- Won the Swiss ice hockey championship with HC Davos in 2005.

Boston Bruins

- Elizabeth C. Dufresne Trophy winner in 2000 and 2003
- Seventh Player Award winner in 2000
- Bruins 3 Stars Award winner in 2000, 2001, 2002, 2003 and 2004
- Named One of the Top 100 Best Bruins Players of all Time

San Jose Sharks

- Sharks Player of the Year winner in 2006, 2007 and 2016
- Three Stars of the Year winner in 2007, 2008 and 2014
- His #19 was retired on November 23, 2024

== Records ==
- Only player in NHL history to win the Art Ross Trophy and Hart Memorial Trophy while switching teams in his winning campaign – 2005–06.
- Highest point total recorded by a player while playing with two different teams in one season – 125 (2005–06)
- Most games played by the first overall selection in the NHL Entry draft, 1714.
- San Jose Sharks' all-time leader in assists – 745
- San Jose Sharks' all-time leader in +/- with +172
- San Jose Sharks' all-time leader in points per game with 1.01

== See also ==
- Power forward (ice hockey)
- List of NHL players with 1,000 points
- List of NHL career assists leaders
- List of NHL players with 1,000 games played

Preceded by Chris Phillips	NHL first overall draft pick 1997	Succeeded by Vincent Lecavalier
Preceded by Johnathan Aitken	Boston Bruins first-round draft pick 1997	Succeeded by Sergei Samsonov
Preceded by Jason Allison	Boston Bruins captain 2002–2005	Succeeded by Zdeno Chára
Preceded by Rob Blake	San Jose Sharks captain 2010–2014	Succeeded by Joe Pavelski
Preceded by Martin St. Louis	Winner of the Art Ross Trophy; 2006	Succeeded by Sidney Crosby
Preceded by Martin St. Louis	Winner of the Hart Memorial Trophy; 2006	Succeeded by Sidney Crosby
