= Arno (disambiguation) =

The Arno is a river in the Tuscany region of Italy.

Arno may also refer to:

== People ==
- Arno (name), including a list of people and fictional characters with the surname and given name
- Arno (singer) (Arnold Charles Ernest Hintjens, 1949–2022), Belgian singer
- Arno of Salzburg (c. 750–821), bishop and archbishop of Salzburg
- Arno von Endsee (died 892), Bishop of Würzburg
- Arno (god), a river god, the personification of the river Arno

== Places ==
- Arno (department), a former département of the First French Empire in present-day Italy
- Arno, Missouri, U.S.
- Arno, Virginia, U.S.
- Arnö, Nyköping Municipality, Sweden
- Arno Atoll, Marshall Islands
- Arno Bay, South Australia
- Arno Vale in Arnold, Nottinghamshire, England

== Other uses ==
- Arno (automobile), a 1908 English automobile
- Arno (typeface), a serif type family
- Arno (ship), launched 1893
- HMS Arno (1915), a Royal Navy destroyer
- Arno XI, a Ferrari-engined hydroplane
- Arno, a Brazilian home appliance company owned by Groupe SEB
- Arno, a synonym for Lysmata, a genus of shrimp

== See also ==
- Arlo (disambiguation)
