= Fraenkelufer Synagogue =

Conservative synagogue in Berlin, Germany

- German: Synagoge Fraenkelufer
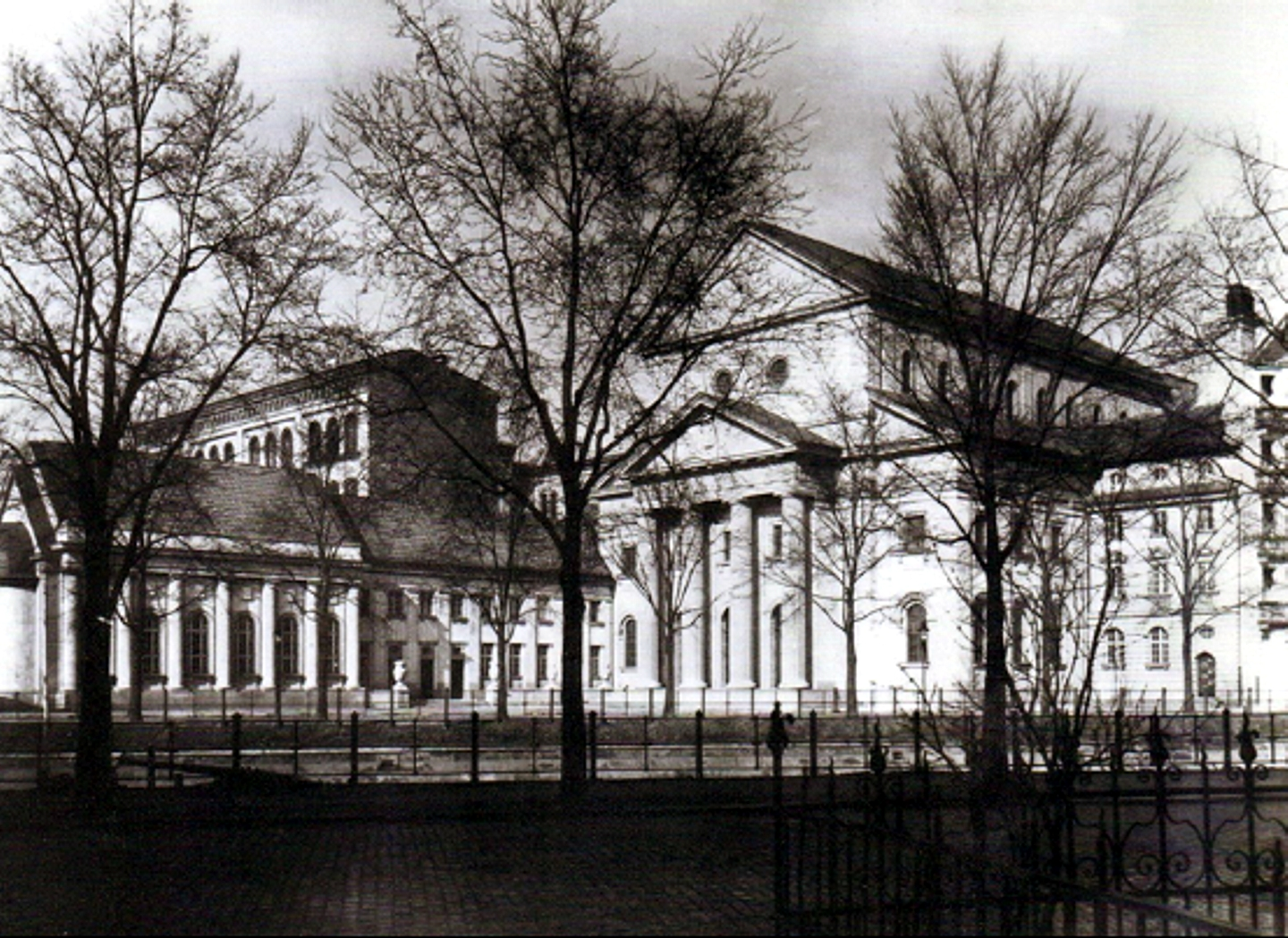
- Building complex of the Jewish community on Kottbusser Ufer, Postcard around 1917

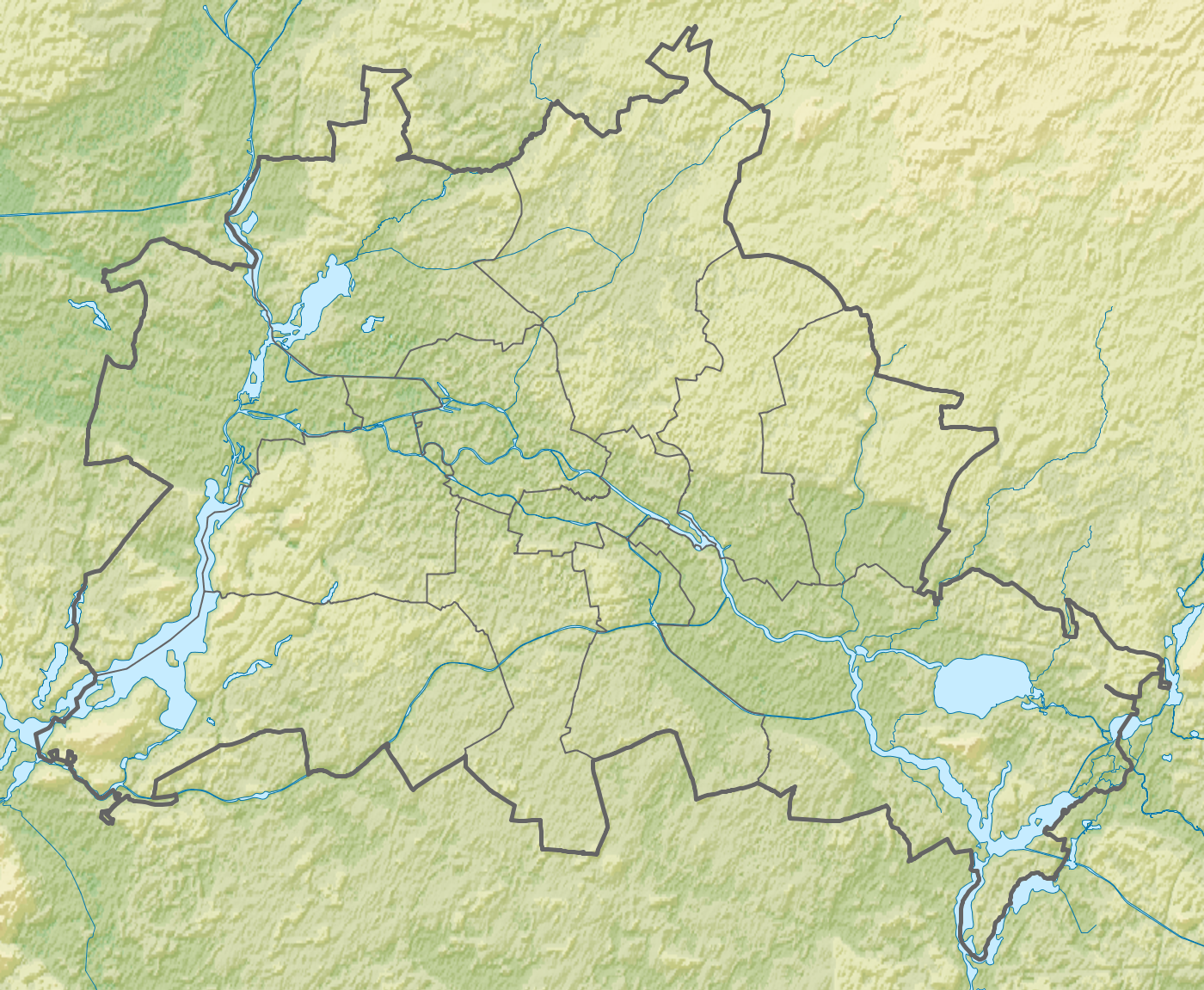
- Location of the synagogue in Berlin

Religion
- Affiliation: Conservative Judaism
- Rite: Nusach Ashkenaz
- Ecclesiastical or organizational status: Synagogue
- Year consecrated: 1916
- Status: Active

Location
- Location: Fraenkelufer 10-16, Berlin-Kreuzberg, Berlin
- Country: Germany
- Interactive map of Fraenkelufer Synagogue
- Coordinates: 52°29′45″N 13°25′1″E

Architecture
- Architect: Alexander Beer
- Type: Synagogue architecture
- Style: Neoclassicalism
- Founder: Jewish Community of Berlin
- Established: c. 1900s (as a congregation)
- Groundbreaking: 1912
- Completed: 1916; 1959 (partial restoration)
- Destroyed: November 1938 (partial destruction) (during Kristallnacht)
- Capacity: 2,000 people

Website
- fraenkelufer.de (in German)

The Fraenkelufer Synagogue (German: Fraenkelufer Synagoge) is a Conservative congregation and synagogue located on Kottbusser Ufer 48–50, today's Fraenkelufer 10-16, in the Kreuzberg district of Berlin, Germany.

The synagogue was completed in 1916 under the direction of Alexander Beer, the master builder of the Jewish Community of Berlin, for an Orthodox congregation. On Kristallnacht in 1938 the main building of the synagogue was badly damaged. Further destruction in the following years led to the structures ultimate demolition in 1958/1959 after the end of World War II. Today the surviving outbuilding, previously used for the youth service, was renovated and is home to a Conservative congregation. A complete reconstruction of the main synagogue that was destroyed by the Nazis is planned for its original location.

== History ==
=== 1913–1933: Construction and Life in the Weimar Republic ===
The Jewish master builder Alexander Beer designed the Neoclassical synagogue in 1912 after the Jewish community acquired the site in 1911. Construction work began a year later and the inauguration took place on September 17, 1916. With over 2,000 seats, this synagogue was one of the largest in Berlin. In addition to the main prayer hall, the building complex also had a weekday synagogue, a hall for youth services, a wedding hall, and meeting and living rooms. In 1925 the Jewish community opened a kindergarten and after-school care center and in the following years a youth home and a holiday playground on the site. Twice a week there was also an afternoon religious school.

The rabbi of the synagogue from its inauguration until 1932 was Isidor Bleichrode. He was later replaced by Rabbi Julius Jakobovits. The composer and collector of synagogue music Arno Nadel officiated as cantor and choir director.

=== 1933–1942: The Synagogue during the Nazi regime ===
The systematic social, economic exclusion and expropriation of the Jews by the Nazis resulted in poverty and material hardship. The Jewish community tried to provide help through welfare offices and a Jewish Winter Aid (Jüdische Winterhilfe) distribution point, which were located in the building complex. In 1935 a relief kitchen was set up in the basement of the synagogue.

As early as 1930 the synagogue was defaced with swastikas and other anti-Semitic slogans. Like many other buildings belonging to the Jewish community, this synagogue was set on fire during the November pogroms, Kristallnacht, in 1938. Since the synagogue was adjacent to a city school, the fire brigade and police kept the spread of the flames in check. The synagogue was badly damaged, but not destroyed, however the main prayer hall could no longer be used for services. From December 1938 until October 1942, the congregation therefore met in the youth synagogue in the side wing of the building instead. Since only seven Berlin synagogues were reopened after the November pogroms, other congregations in the neighborhood also held their services in the building.

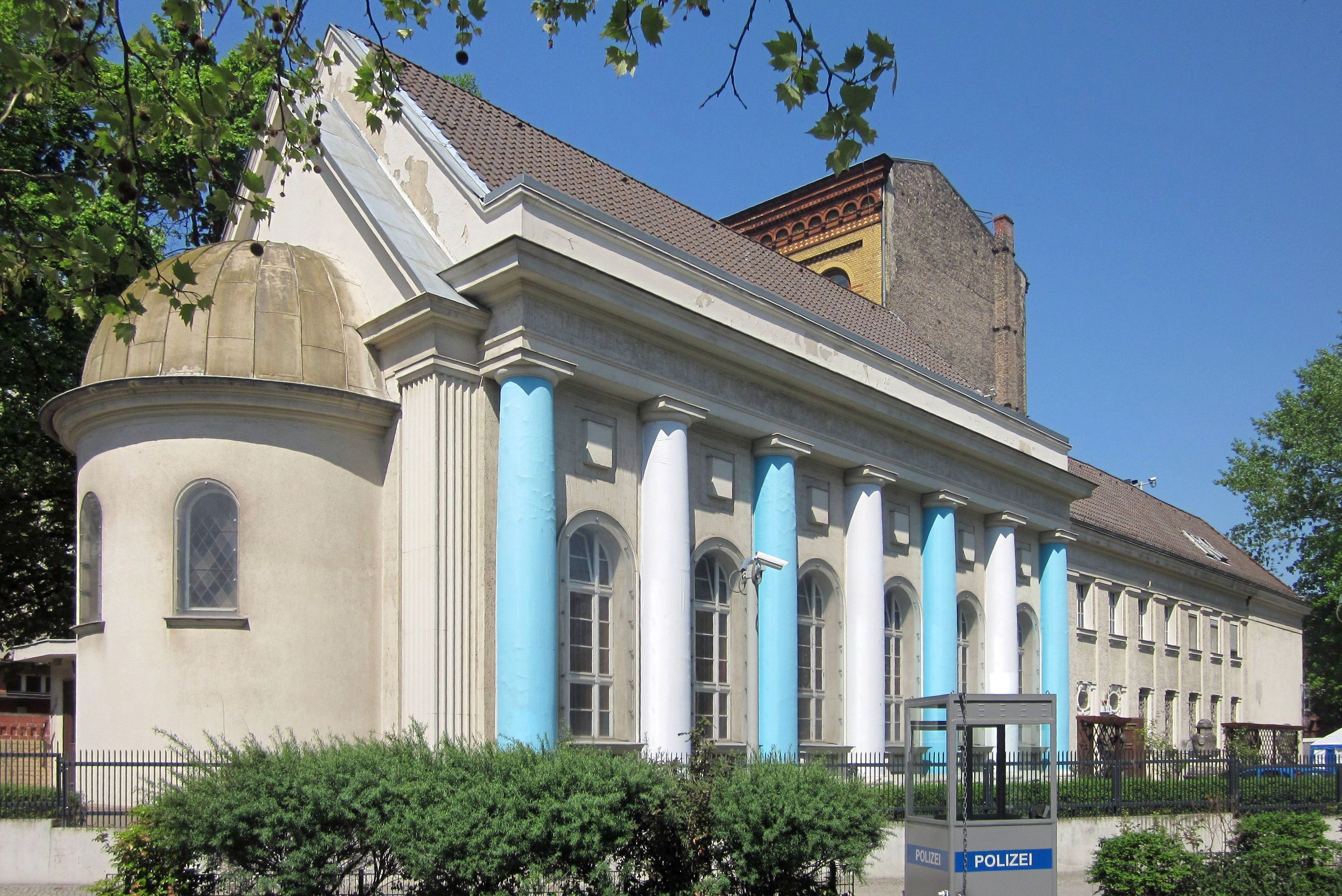
Youth Synagogue on Fraenkelufer

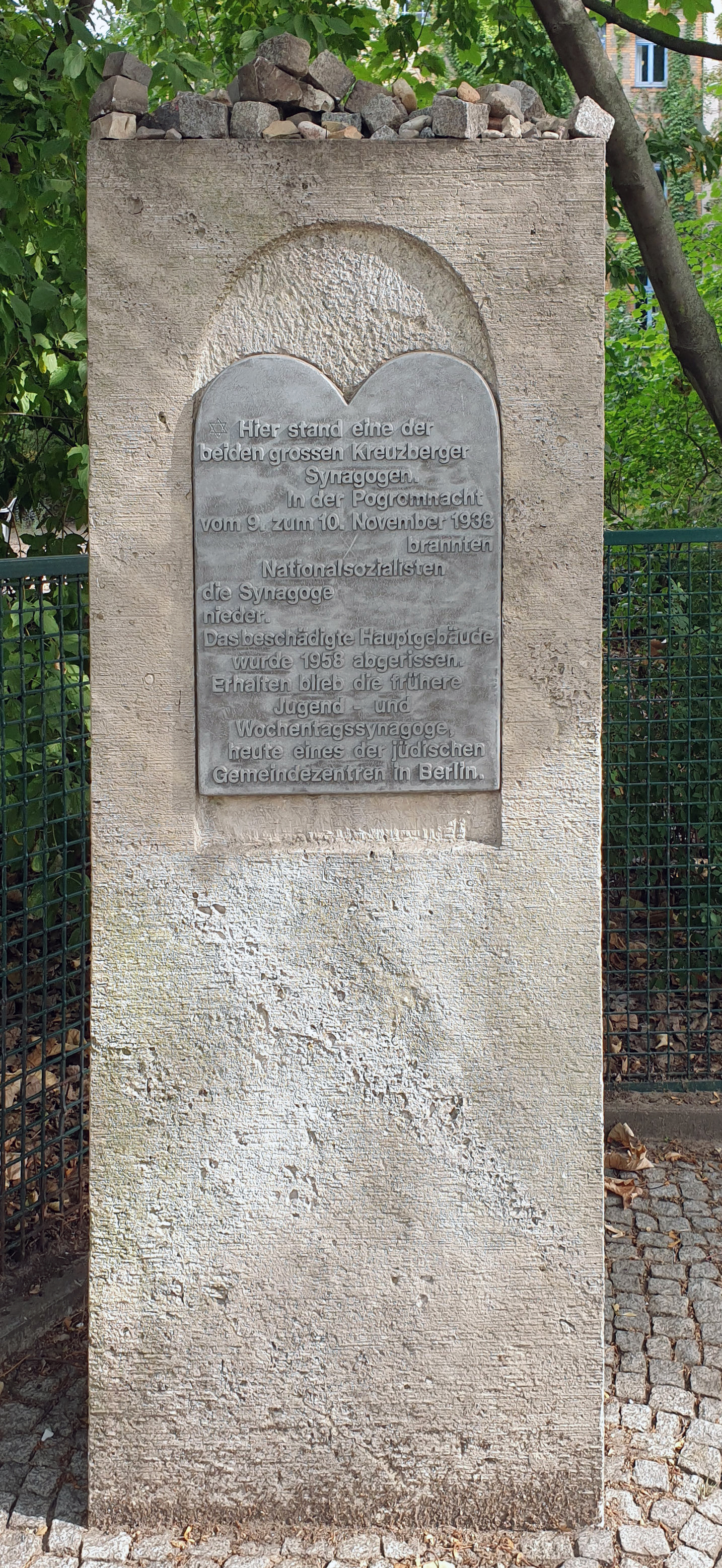
Memorial Marker at Fraenkelufer 10

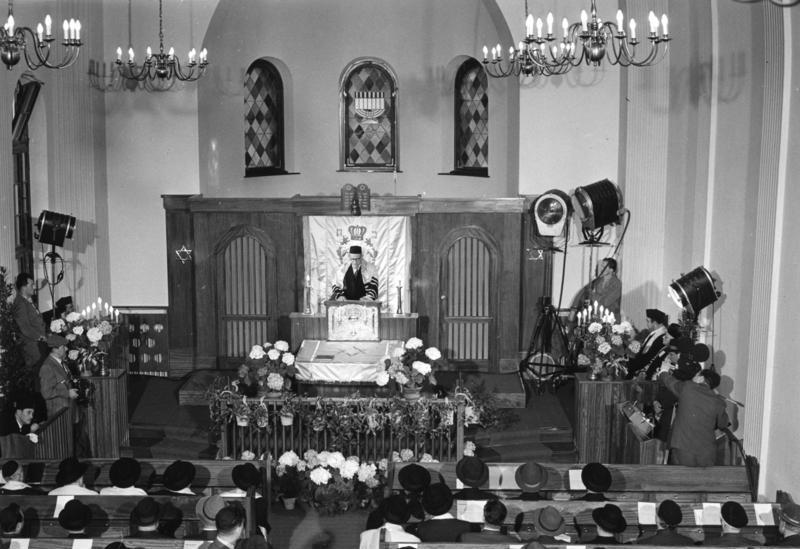
Inauguration of the Synagogue, 1959

After Rabbi Julius Jakobovits emigrated to Great Britain, where his son Immanuel Jakobovits later became Chief Rabbi, Rabbi Georg Kantorowski, Rabbi Regina Jonas and Rabbi Martin Riesenburger occasionally officiated in the synagogue.

At the end of 1941 the building was used to store looted Jewish property from around Berlin. At the beginning of 1942 the Gestapo occupied the entire property and used it to park military vehicles. In a bombing raid on Berlin in 1944 the site suffered further destruction and in 1958/1959 the main building was fully demolished.

=== Reopening in 1945 ===
Immediately after the war, the youth services building was the first synagogue in Berlin to be reopened in time for Rosh Hashanah, the Jewish New Year celebrations, in September 1945. This is primarily thanks to the initiative of the Jewish American soldier Harry Nowalsky. The Jewish Hungarian-American war photographer Robert Capa immortalized this special moment in a series of pictures for ’’Life’’ magazine. Some of these images have been displayed in the synagogue since 2016. In the years following its reopening in 1945, weddings, bar mitzvahs and religious instruction took place in the synagogue.

In 1985, around 25 Torah curtains from various synagogues were found hidden in the attic and were restored. Some of them can be viewed today in the synagogue on Fraenkelufer.

A memorial stone by Cornelia Lengfeld erected on the property boundary in 1989 reminds visitors of the destruction in the past. The building is a historical monument, and a memorial plaque on the embankment shows the earlier construction and tells the story of the site's destruction.

=== The community since its rededication in 1959 ===
On April 22, 1959, the former side wing of the synagogue was consecrated again, after significant reconstruction and has since been used for prayers and community life. There, rabbis of different affiliations take turns, from liberal to orthodox. In the beginning, the community of prayer consisted of survivors and returnees. Many of them lived and worked in the immediate vicinity of the synagogue. Over the years, immigrants from different countries also joined, and in the 1980s and 1990s, many immigrants came from the former Soviet Union. From the mid-2000s, the congregants became even more diverse and international: Many young Israelis, North and South Americans, people from different European countries and beyond have made Kreuzberg and Neukölln - and with it the Fraenkelufer Synagogue - their new home.

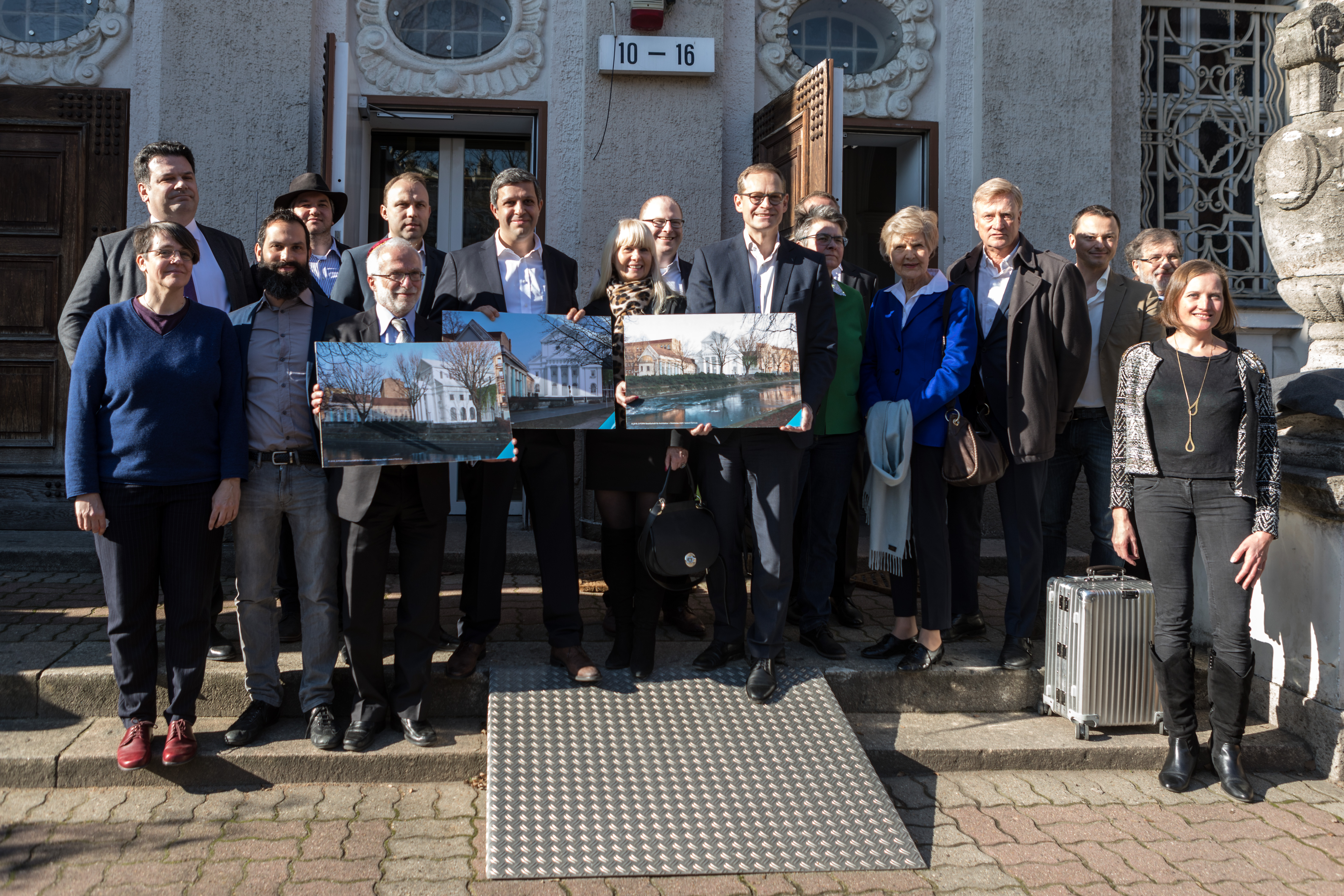
The Board of Trustees for the Reconstruction of the Fraenkelufer Synagogue, 2019

In 2012 the Friends of the Fraenkelufer Synagogue (Freunde der Synagoge Fraenkelufer e. V.) was founded by supporters and members in order to actively shape community life and to organize cultural and educational events. The community has grown so much that the reconstruction of the original synagogue building as a Jewish community and cultural center is planned.

=== Planned reconstruction ===
The synagogue is to be completely rebuilt in its original location in Kreuzberg. The project represents the first time that a fully complete reconstruction of a synagogue that was destroyed during the Nazi period in Berlin will come to fruition. Other projects in the city to date are partial or considered renovations.

On the initiative of the SPD Politician Raed Saleh, the Förderverein Jüdisches Zentrum Synagoge Fraenkelufer e.V. set up a board of trustees that will deal intensively with the reconstruction. The 20-person committee attaches great importance to the fact that the new synagogue is based on the architectural style of the previous building. The committee includes Raed Saleh, Monika Herrmann, Michael Müller, as well as representatives of the Jewish and Muslim communities and people from business and the media. Fundraising and engagement with the general community of the need for the reconstruction has commenced. The laying of the foundation stone was planned for 2023, 85 years after the destruction in the night of the pogrom. Completion is planned for the 110th anniversary of the synagogue in 2026.

== Architecture ==
The synagogue consisted of a main building with several auxiliary buildings on a triangular site, in which a weekday synagogue, official apartments and a building for the youth service were housed. Accordingly, it was not only intended to serve as a place of worship, but also as a community center and was used in this way in the early years.

The synagogue building consisted of a three-aisled structure that offered space for 2,000 people. It was built as a pillar basilica, with the facade facing the Landwehr Canal structured with windows in the upper storey. As an architectural style, Beer chose a neoclassical style with elements from medieval and baroque buildings; a large portico with four Greek columns represented the dominant three-part entrance area.

The smaller synagogue for youth services was structured by Doric half-columns. By the end of the 1970s, its facade was painted green and white. It is roughly half as high as the former main sanctuary building.

== See also ==
- History of the Jews in Germany
- List of synagogues in Germany (in German)
