= FC Locarno =

Association football club in Switzerland

- Full name: Football Club Locarno
- Founded: 1 July 1906; 120 years ago
- Ground: Stadio del Lido, Locarno, Switzerland
- Capacity: 11,000 (1,000 seated)
- Owner: North Sixth Group
- Chairman: Mauro Cavalli
- Manager: Remy Frigomosca
- League: 2. Liga Interregional
- 2024–25: Group 3, 3rd of 16
Home colours	Away colours

FC Locarno is a Swiss football club based in Locarno in the Italian-speaking canton of Ticino in southern Switzerland. The club currently play in 2. Liga Interregional, the fifth tier of Swiss football.

== History ==
The club, founded in 1906, spent most of its history in lower levels, but also had several spells in the top Swiss level ( in 1930–31, 1933–36, 1945–53 and 1986–87).

In 2018, the club filed for bankruptcy and entered administration. This resulted in an automatic relegation to the ninth level of Swiss football. A local veterinarian, Mauro Cavalli, bought the club and led it to four straight promotions.

In 2023, Cavalli sold FC Locarno to North Sixth Group, which specializes in purchasing and developing lower-tier clubs around the world.

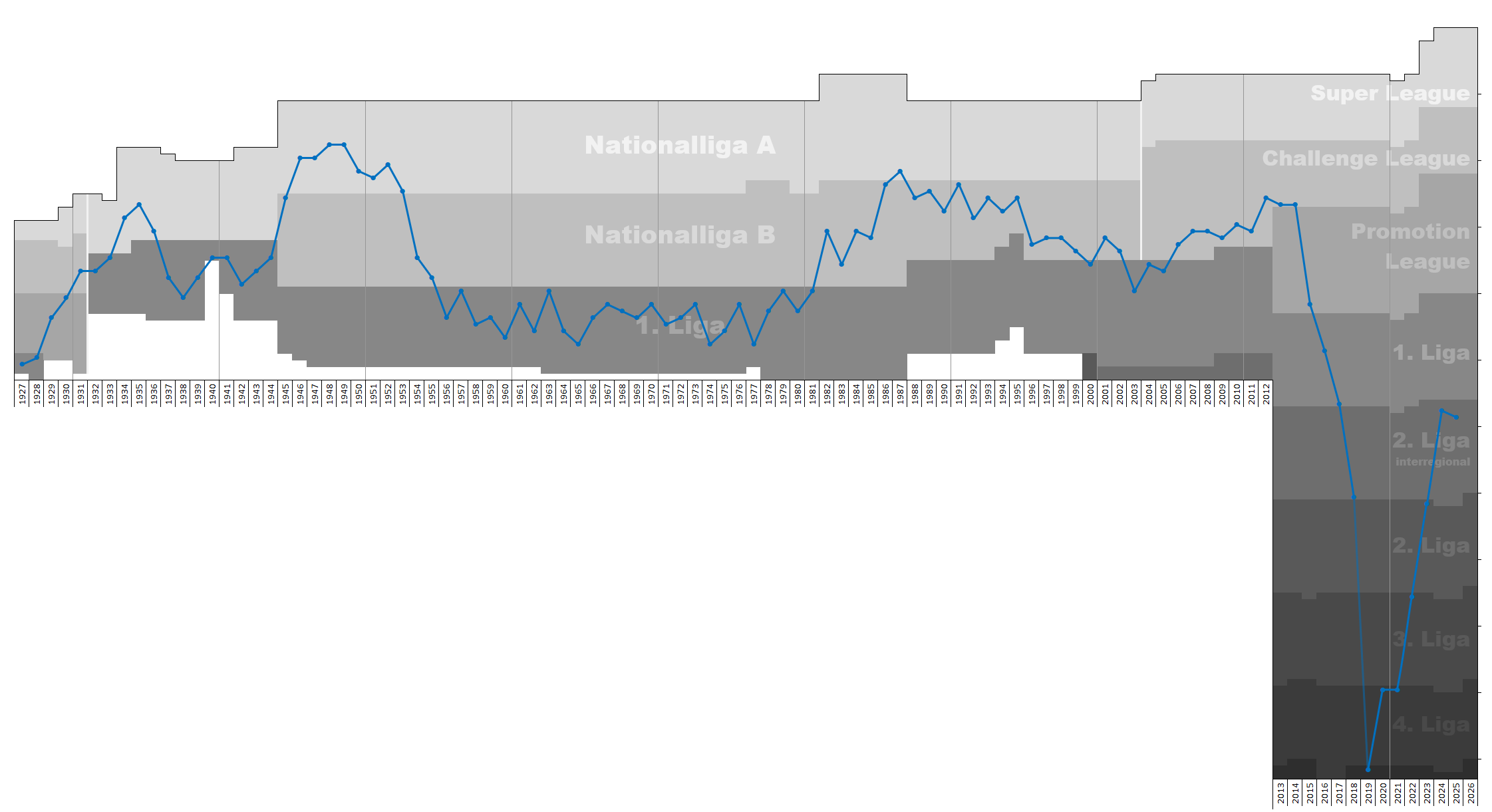
Chart of FC Locarno table positions in the Swiss football league system

== Honours ==
- Swiss Cup
  - Runners-up (1): 1950–51

== Former coaches ==
- (Hungary) da:Carlos Pintér (1954–1955)
- (Czech Republic) Wenzel Halama (1986–1987)
- (Germany) Paul Schönwetter (1995–1998), (2008–2009)
- (Switzerland) (Italy) Roberto Chiappa (2005)
- (Switzerland) (Italy) Arno Rossini (2005–2008)
