= Arlo (disambiguation) =

Arlo is a male given name, including a list of people and fictional characters with the name.

Arlo may refer to:

- Arlo the Alligator Boy, a 2021 animated film
- Arlo (album), by Arlo Guthrie, 1968
- Arló, a village in Borsod-Abaúj-Zemplén county, Hungary
- Arlo Technologies, an American company that makes wireless surveillance cameras

== See also ==
- Arno (disambiguation)
