= Arno XI =

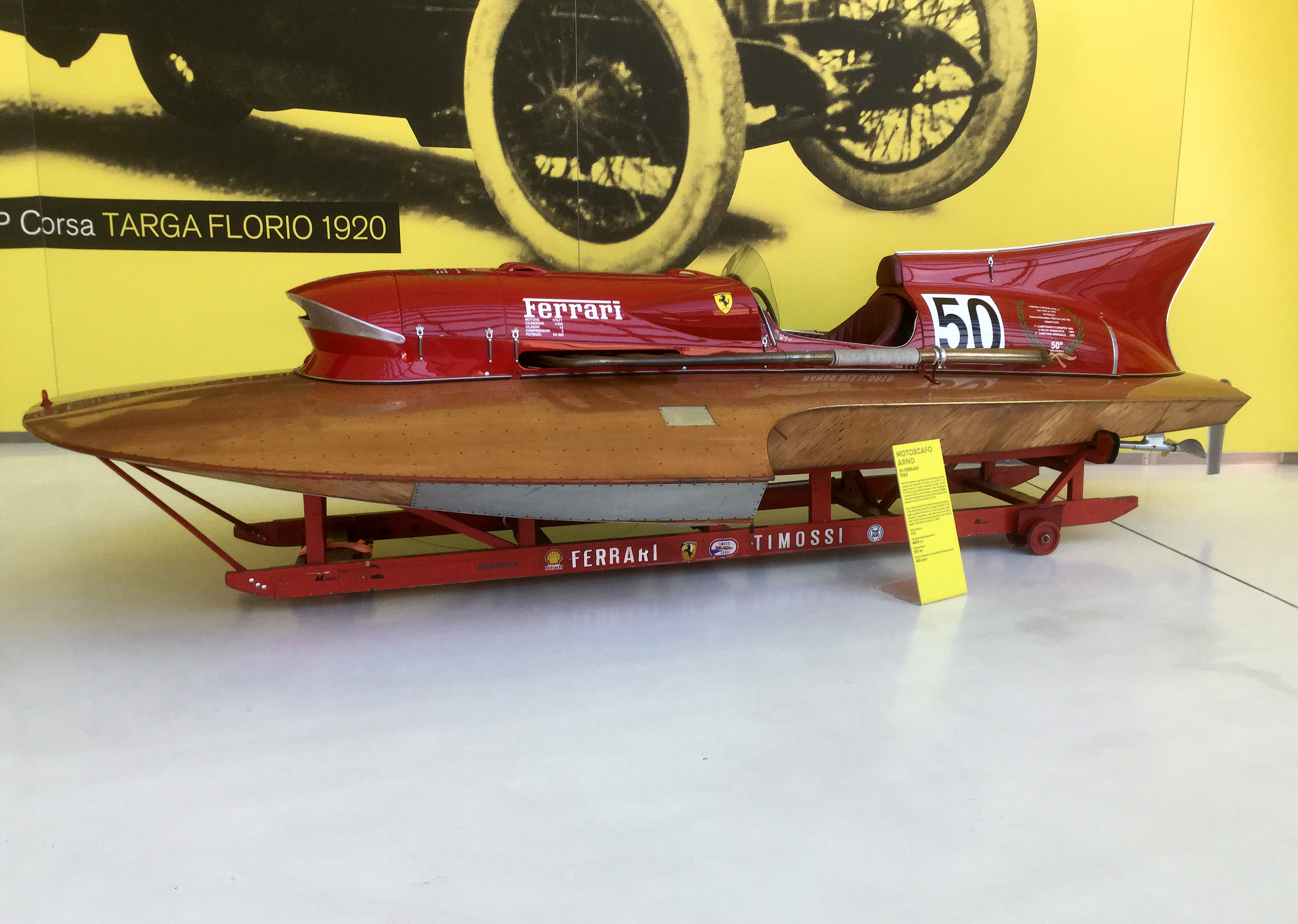
- Arno XI on display in the Museo Enzo Ferrari
- Name: Arno XI
- Namesake: Arno
- Builder: Cantieri Timossi

General characteristics
- Type: Hydroplane
- Length: 6,200 mm (20 ft 4.1 in)
- Beam: 2,470 mm (8 ft 1.2 in)
- Installed power: 1× 4,493.73 cc Ferrari Lampredi V12 with twin superchargers and twin four-choke carburettors; 600+ bhp

Arno XI is a hydroplane conceived by Achille Castoldi. Designed to break water speed records, it was built between 1952 and 1953 by the Cantiere Timossi boatyard, located in Azzano (a frazione of Mezzegra) on the shores of Lake Como. Castoldi persuaded Ferrari, via its racing drivers Alberto Ascari and Luigi Villoresi, to supply him with the same power unit used in the Ferrari 375 F1.

The engine was installed in a Timossi three-point racing hydroplane hull. Castoldi managed to further increase horsepower by attaching two superchargers. The result was a 502 bhp speedboat, which he used to hit a 150.19 mph (241.71 km/h) top speed in October 1953 on Lake Iseo. This world speed record for an 800 kg boat still stands today.

A similar hydroplane was constructed by Guido Monzino in 1954. Like Arno XI, it utilizes a Lampredi engine, in this case sourced from a wrecked Ferrari 375 MM.

== Today ==
Arno XI was later sold and raced in numerous competitions, retiring in 1968. It has since been restored and sold at a 2012 RM Sotheby's auction for €868,000. In 2021, the Arno XI was listed for sale again at an asking price of $12 million.
