= Arno Jordaan =

South African singer

Arno Jordaan (born 19 February 1984) born in Port Elizabeth is a South African pop singer singing in Afrikaans.

Arno Jordaan studied at Hoërskool Framesby, and Hoërskool Brandwag and was greatly interested initially in rugby taking part in Cravenweek competition representing his province. He had his musical beginnings in 2003 appearing as a contestant in a reality television show kykNET Zing on the Afrikaans language TV station kykNET partnering with Susan, another competitor on the show. Jordaan ended up as runner-up and was signed to EMI label where his debut album was a joint collaboration with Susan in Vir altyd in jou drome.

Jordaan later on released a number of solo albums on EMI starting with the successful Altyd and has appeared alongside a number of established singers like Steve Hofmeyr, Kurt Darren, Dozi and Pieter Smith. His follow-up album Ek wil jou hê went platinum. He also appeared at a number of international rugby events singing the South African national anthem and released the soccer-themed "The Time Is Now". He also appeared during the 10th anniversary of Huisgenoot Skouspel in Sun City and several times at the Innibos Nasionale Kunstefees festival. He also enjoys popularity with South African diaspora audiences in Australia, UK and United States. With his fourth album Gee my he was nominated for the South African Music Awards (SAMA) form category "Best African dance album" with the album going platinum. His most recent album Stukkie van my hart was certified gold.

Jordaan is married to Lizanie Poh. The couple had a son, Milan Jordaan, born in December 2013. In 2013, Jordaan's brother and manager Dewald Jordaan survived after suffering a serious car accident. In 2013, Arno Jordaan appeared in a small role in the musical As Jy Sing directed by Andre Odendaal.

== Discography ==
=== Albums ===
- 2003: Vir altyd in jou drome (duet album with Susan)
- 2005: Altyd
- 2006: Ek wil jou hê!
- 2007: Wil jy iets sê?
- 2008: Gee my
- 2010: Stukkie van my hart
- ????: Arno Jordaan

Compilation albums

- 2008: Beste Afrikaanse Hits

=== Singles / Videography ===
- 2007: "Aan jou vas"
- 2008: "In die Donker"
- 2009: "Ek het plek vir jou by my"
- 2009: "Gee my"
- 2010: "Stukkie van jou hart"
- 2014: "Richterskaal"
