= Arno Rossini =

Swiss football manager (born 1957)

Personal information
- Full name: Arno Rossini
- Date of birth: May 16, 1957 (age 69)
- Place of birth: Switzerland
- Position: Defender

Senior career*
Years	Team	Apps	(Gls)
1976–1985	AC Bellinzona		

Managerial career
- 1985–1989: US Giubiasco
- 1994–1997: AC Bellinzona
- 2003–2005: US Giubiasco
- 2005: Losone Sportiva
- 2005–2008: FC Locarno
- 2008: GC Biaschesi
- 2008–2011: BSC Young Boys (assistant)
- 2013: FC Sion
- 2013–2014: US Monte Carasso
- 2014–2015: AC Bellinzona
- * Club domestic league appearances and goals

Arno Rossini (born 16 May 1957) is a Swiss football manager, who has managed a number of Swiss clubs. He was most recently the manager of AC Bellinzona. He previously managed FC Sion.
