= Arno Marsh =

American musician (1928–2019)

Arno Marsh (May 28, 1928 – July 12, 2019) was an American jazz tenor saxophonist.

Born in Grand Rapids, Michigan, United States, Marsh played early on in local dance bands, then played in Woody Herman's ensemble from 1951 to 1953, where he soloed frequently on Herman's Mars Records releases. He led a band in a Grand Rapids residency from 1953 to 1955, then rejoined Herman intermittently through 1958. He also recorded with Stan Kenton, Charlie Barnet, Lionel Hampton, Buddy Rich, and Harry James. After the late 1950s, most of Marsh's activity was in Las Vegas leading hotel orchestras; he accompanied Nancy Wilson on record with one of them in 1968, and did a Woody Herman tribute in 1974. His son, Randy Marsh, is a jazz drummer who performed for years with pianist Eddie Russ, a pupil of Art Tatum.

Marsh died at the age of 91 in July 2019.
