= Claeys Formula =

The Claeys Formula is used in Belgium by the practitioners of social law to evaluate the notice period that has to be respected when an employee is dismissed. This formula derives from a statistical analysis of the case law and takes into account three variables: length of service, age and remuneration.

In 2010, the Claeys Formula was revised and updated as the average notice period being granted by the judges in tribunals was shorter than what was granted previously. The formula now reads as follows:

for white-collar employees with an annual gross remuneration under 120,000 EUR: (0.87 × length of service) + (0.055 × age) + (0.038 × annual gross remuneration/1000) - 1.95 = months' notice

The analysis of the case law also revealed that where the annual remuneration equals or exceeds 120,000.00 €, the coefficient for the remuneration has to be modified, thus:

for white-collar employees with an annual gross remuneration exceeding 120,000 EUR: (0.87 × length of service) + (0.055 × age) – (0.0029 × annual gross remuneration/1000) + 2.96 = months' notice

There has been a further update to Belgian labour law which allows for new fixed notice periods as from 1 January 2012. These however only apply to employees hired as of the start date i.e. 1 January 2012.
