= Arno Poebel =

Portrait of Arno Poebel

Arno Poebel (1881–1958) was a German Assyriologist. He studied theology and classical philology in Heidelberg, Marburg, Zürich and Jena. In 1905/6, he worked with Sumerian documents at the University of Pennsylvania Museum of Archaeology and Anthropology, Philadelphia, submitting an edition of Sumerian legal documents as his dissertation in 1906.

He taught at Johns Hopkins University, Baltimore during 1911 to 1913, editing further Sumerian texts at the Pennsylvania Museum during 1912 to 1914. Among his most important finds was discovering and translating the flood story of the Eridu Genesis in the collection of cuneiform tablets recovered from digs at Sippur and stored at the University of Pennsylvania. This tablet, dated from c.1700-1600 BC, is the earliest known version of the various forms of flood myth from Mesopotamia. He was at the University of Rostock during 1919 to 1928. His Sumerian grammar (1923) was seminal to the field of Sumerology and remains relevant.

Poebel emigrated to the United States in 1928, becoming professor of Assyriology and Sumerology at the University of Chicago Oriental Institute in 1930. He was editor of the Chicago Assyrian Dictionary from 1933 until his retirement in 1946.

== Bibliography ==
- Babylonian Legal and Business Documents. Philadelphia 1909. (Vol. V, Vol. VI)
- Historical and Grammatical Texts. Philadelphia 1914.
- Sumerische Studien. Hinrichs, Leipzig 1921.
- Grundzüge der sumerischen Grammatik. Rostock 1923.
- Sumerische Untersuchungen. De Gruyter, Berlin 1927–1929.
