= Arno Schmidt (chef) =

Austrian chef and food critic and writer (born c.1931)

Arno Schmidt (born c. 1931) is an Austrian chef and food critic and writer.

== Biography ==
Schmidt was born c. 1931, in Salzburg. From 1946 to 1949 in Bad Gastein, an Austrian Spa. After passing the mandatory government examination Arno worked in many countries, including the Grand Hotel Royal in Stockholm Sweden, the Beau Rivage Hotel in Geneva and three years in Casa Langer, a Caterer in Bogota, Colombia.

He arrived in New York City in 1959 as permanent resident and found employment as Chef Poissonier at the venerable Hotel St. Regis when it was still privately owned by Mrs. Astor.

Appointments as Executive followed quickly culminating as Executive Chef at the Waldorf Astoria Hotel from 1969 to 1979.

He started writing a monthly newsletter called: “Notes from the Chef’s Desk” which eventually resulted as a book with the same name. More books followed including The Banquet Business and the Chef's Book of Quantities, Yields and Sizes, Chatting about The Waldorf Astoria, and his biography “Peeking Behind the Wallpaper”.

His interest in culinary education led to board member status membership at the Culinary Institute of America and appointment as Trustee Emeritus.

He also lectured as adjunct professor at NYU and other colleges and cruise lines.

After leaving The Waldorf Astoria Hotel, Arno Schmidt was hired by Mrs. Helmsley as Food and beverage Director to organize and open the Harley Hotel on 42nd Street between Third and Second Avenue. Appointment as Food and Beverage Director from 1984 to 1986 at the venerable Plaza Hotel followed,

From there on he worked as an independent consultant with the Kitchen Design Company Henry Grossbard and worked on numerous projects including the Jewish Museum and the Guggenheim in NYC and the yet to be built Guggenheim in Abu Dhabi.

His long industry involvement led to numerous awards including Silver Plate 1984. Judge at the Culinary Salon organized by the Societé Culinaire Philanthropique and Team Manager for the Chaine des Rôtisseurs Culinary Team to the Culinary Olympics 1988. He was President of the local Chapter of the American Culinary Federation ICA/ACF.
