= Madame Arnaud =

Madame Arnaud was the widow of a French Army officer, she organized the Volunteer Corps of French and Belgian Women for the National Defense in 1915, and petitioned for the active service of women in the French Army.
