= Lingo24 =

- Company type: Independent
- Industry: Translation
- Founded: September 2001
- Headquarters: Edinburgh, United Kingdom
- Area served: Global
- Revenue: £9.1m (2014)
- Owner: Christian Arno
- Number of employees: 230
- Website: Lingo24.com

Lingo24 is a UK-registered translation company that was formed in 2001.

== History & Overview ==
Lingo24 is a business translation and localisation services company, founded as an online start-up by Oxford University languages graduate Christian Arno, from his parents' Aberdeen home in September 2001. The company launched its New Zealand operation in 2003, Romania in 2005, Panama in early 2008 and Edinburgh later the same year. In 2011 Lingo24 opened an Asian hub in Cebu City, the Philippines and expanded its European operations with the opening of an office in Nuremberg, Germany, in May 2012.

In 2013 Andrew Campbell was appointed as Global Managing Director, and worldwide staff exceeded 200. Lingo24 was named the 62nd largest translation agency worldwide by Common Sense Advisory, and turnover for the year was £7.5 million.

In 2014 Lingo24 signed a multimillion-pound investment deal with a consortium led by former Wood Mackenzie Chairman Paul Gregory. American entrepreneur and investor Ted Alling joined the company's Advisory Board. Lingo24 launched an API, allowing customers to connect directly to its translation platform.

In 2015 Lingo24 was named the 54th largest translation agency in the world and the company launched plug-ins for its API for major e-commerce platforms Magento and Demandware.

Lingo24 has over 230 full-time employees around the globe and works with a network of over 4,000 native-speaking professional translators.

== Awards ==
The company was named as the best e-business start-up in Scotland in 2002 and Arno won the Shell LiveWire 'Young Entrepreneur of the year' competition in 2003. He was also a finalist in the Scotsman Entrepreneur of the year Award at the National Business Awards for Scotland, 2009.

In December 2009, Lingo24 won two awards at the inaugural HeraldScotland.com Digital Business Awards, one in the 'Export' category and one in 'Business to Business'.

In March 2010, it was announced that Lingo24 won two awards, a Customer King Award from Cisco, and one at the International Trade Awards for the Scotland Region, which was sponsored by HSBC.

Lingo24 was nominated as one of the regional finalists in HSBC's Business Thinking initiative, culminating in company founder Christian Arno going on a thought-exchange trip to Istanbul in September, 2010. Lingo24 eventually won the HSBC Business Thinking final following an awards ceremony in Edinburgh on Tuesday 26 October.

Lingo24 was placed on the Times International Track 100 in 2011, making it the fastest-growing translation company in the UK. It reported international sales growth of 57 per cent in the previous two years.

In October 2012, Lingo24 won an Excellence Award at the TAUS User Conference (Seattle) for its new Coach translation technology platform.

In May 2014 Lingo24 was named Scottish Exporter of the Year and International Trade Best Professional Service Advisor at the inaugural Scottish Export Awards.

== See also ==
- Duolingo
- vidby
