= Robert Arno =

Engineer

Robert Arno, from the ITT Exelis Advanced Information Systems of Rome, NY, was named Fellow of the Institute of Electrical and Electronics Engineers (IEEE) in 2014 "for contributions in applying stochastic modeling techniques to power distribution systems for critical facilities."
