= Arno Esch =

German politician

Arno Esch (6 February 1928 – 24 July 1951) was a German liberal politician of the late 1940s in the Soviet Occupation Zone. He was executed at the Lubyanka prison in Moscow in 1951 at the age of 23.

== Biography ==
Esch was born and brought up in Memel (Klaipėda). In late 1944 he was evacuated to Mecklenburg, where he was drafted into military service as a Navy–Flakhelfer. In 1946 Esch started to study law at the University of Rostock and became a member of the Liberal Democratic Party of Germany (LDPD). He opposed the leading role claimed by the communist Youth organisation Freie Deutsche Jugend and was elected into the LDPD committee in 1948 and the LDPD executive committee in 1949. He was a co-author of the Eisenacher program of the LDPD.

Esch wrote several editorials for the Norddeutsche Zeitung, the newspaper of the Liberal-Democrats in Mecklenburg, in which he applied for the Separation of powers, individual civil and political rights and the abolition of the death penalty. Esch caused a controversy with his dictum: "A Chinese liberal is more affiliated to me than a German communist".

Esch was imprisoned by the Soviet MGB on 18 October 1949, together with 12 other young Liberals and sentenced to death by a Soviet Military tribunal for "counterrevolutionary activities" in July 1950, he was transferred to Moscow, where the sentence was approved and executed at the Lubyanka prison on 24 July 1951.

The judgement was voided in 1990 by the Soviet High Court.

== Remembrance ==
The FDP-attached Arno-Esch-Foundation and the Arno-Esch-Award of the German Liberal Association of Academics are named after him. Streets in Rostock, Schwerin and Schönberg (Mecklenburg-Vorpommern) as well as a memorial plaque at the University of Rostock remind of Esch.
