= Arno Lamoer =

- Police career
- Department: South African Police Service
- Rank: Lieutenant General

Arno Lamoer

Western Cape Provincial Police Commissioner
- In office 25 November 2010 – 17 April 2015

Lieutenant General Arno Lamoer is a former Western Cape Provincial Police Commissioner for the South African Police Service. He was suspended in 2015 after being arrested on charges of corruption. He was given a six year sentence for corruption whilst he was Provincial Police Commissioner.

== Early life ==
Prior to joining the police force Lamoer was a teacher for two years.

== Police career ==
From 1980 to 1986 Lamoer started his career as a lecturer and police trainer at Bishop Lavis Training College. He was then promoted to station commander of Atlantis police station and in 1990 was transferred to Manenberg police station as station commander until 1994. In 1996 he was appointed to address corruption in the Western Cape. Later in the same year he was promoted to Deputy Area Commissioner East metropole, Western Cape. In 1998 he was head of the Organised Crime and Public Safety directorates and then served as commander for special operations in the province. In 2006 he was made a divisional commander and in 2010 he was appointed as the Western Cape's Provincial Police Commissioner.

== Corruption ==
A source within the Western Cape Crime Intelligence unit leaked information that revealed that Lamoer was warned by national police commissioner Riah Phiyega that he was being investigated for his associated with an alleged Cape Town drug-dealer and well-known businessperson. It was alleged that Lamoer's daughter had received R20,000 deposited directly into her account as a wedding gift to help pay-off a loan by the owner of a Cape Town based tow-truck company who was also a close friend. It was alleged by a senior police source that the Crime Intelligence Unit was retaliating for an investigation Lamoer had launched looking into corruption within the unit.

Lamoer was criticised by the Western Cape parliament's standing committee on community safety for his silence on the allegations and urged him to give a statement about the allegations. In 2018 Lamoer was given a six year prison sentence for corruption.
