= Arno Sild =

Estonian politician (born 1947)

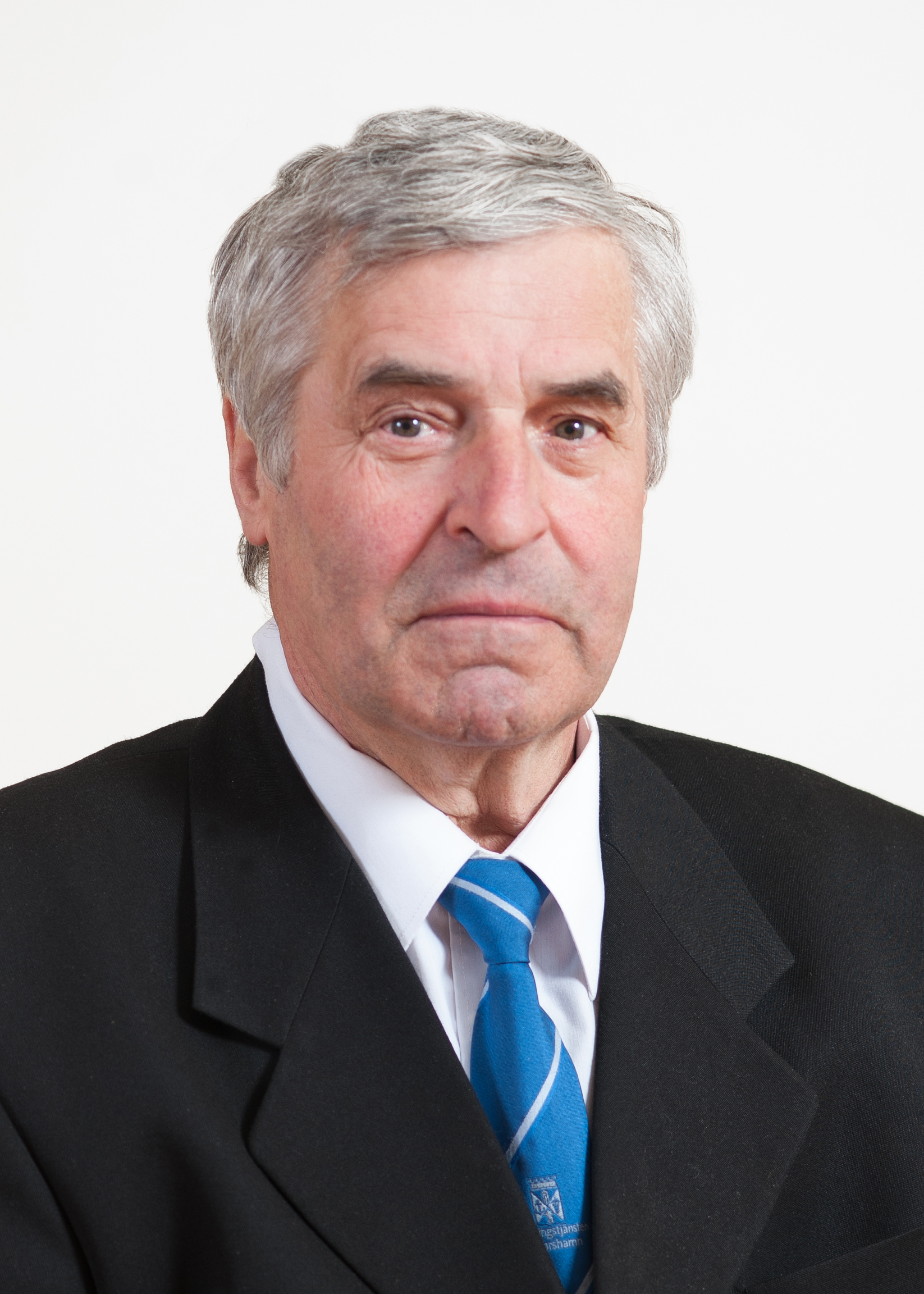
Arno Sild in 2015.

Arno Sild (born 26 April 1947 in Rammuka, Võru County) is an Estonian politician. He was a member of the XIII Riigikogu.

In 1971 he graduated from University of Tartu with a degree in law.

Since 1992 he has been a member of several agrarian or conservative parties, including the Estonian Conservative People's Party.
