= Arno Nadel =

German painter

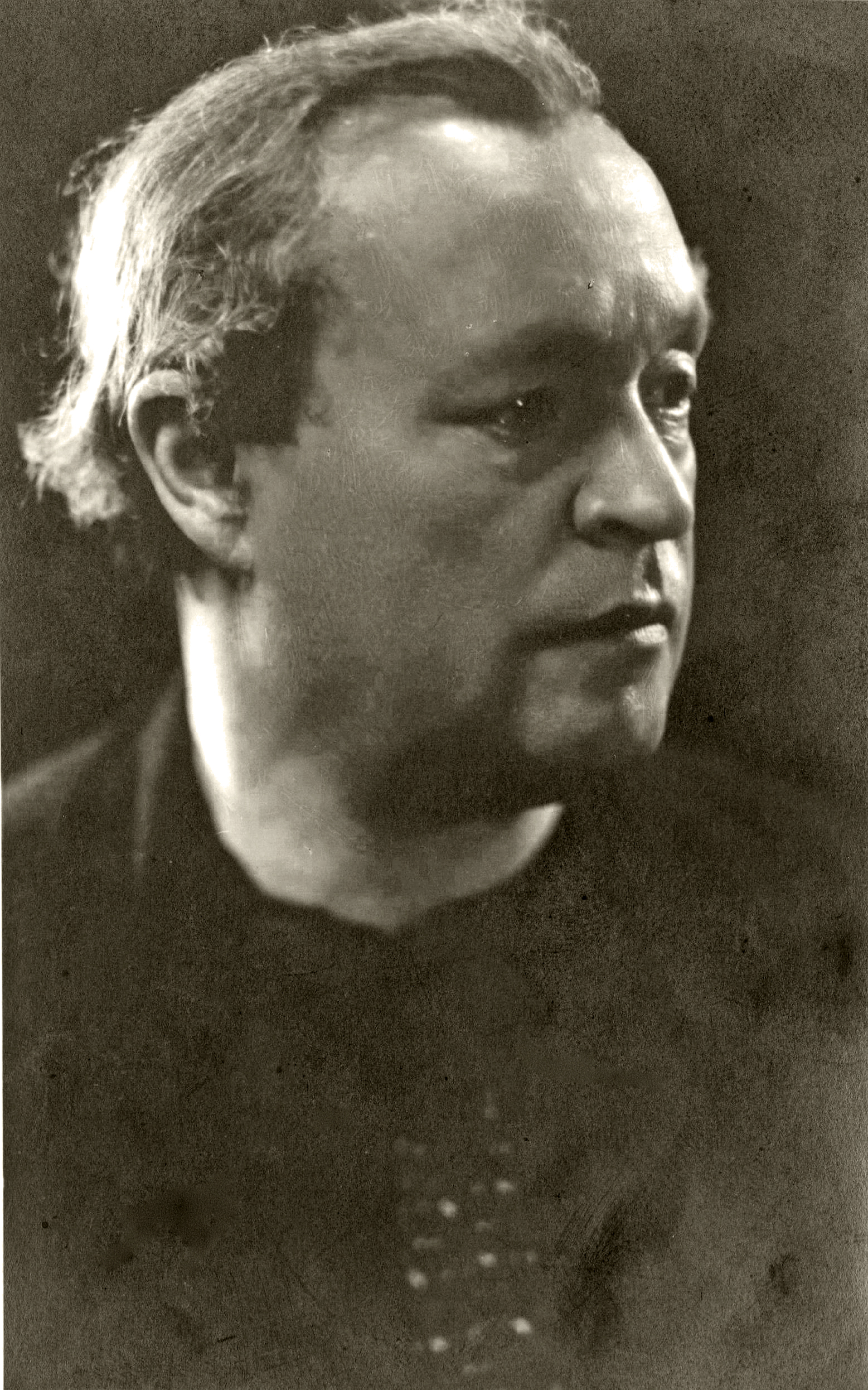
- Born: 5 October 1878; Vilnius, Russian Empire (now Vilnius, Lithuania)
- Died: March 1943 (aged 64); Auschwitz-Birkenau, German-occupied Poland
- Occupations: Musicologist, Composer, Playwright, Poet, Artist

Arno Nadel (October 5, 1878 – March 1943) was a Lithuanian musicologist, composer, playwright, poet, and painter.

== Early life ==
Nadel was born in Vilnius, Lithuania, at the time of his birth, part of the Russian Empire, to an Orthodox Jewish family.

== Career ==
In 1890, Nadel moved from Lithuania to Germany. At the age of 12, Nadel studied in Königsberg, Germany, under the cantor Eduard Birnbaum. He also studied with conductor and composer Robert Schwalm.

In 1895, when he was 17 years old, he moved to Berlin and enrolled in the Hochschule für die Wissenschaft des Judentums. He studied with composer Ludwig Mendelssohn and Max Lowengard.

After graduating he worked at the Kottbusser Ufer Synagogue (Synagoge am Kottbusser Ufer) as an educator and choirmaster. In 1916, he became choir director of the Jewish community of Berlin which included the supervision of music at all Berlin synagogues.

Nadel was also a very prolific playwright and poet. Starting in 1918, Nadel took up painting as well, painting several self-portraits and biblical scenes.

In 1922, at the request of Jewish leadership, Nadel worked for years on an anthology of synagogue music, Kompendium Hallelujah! Gesänge für den jüdischen Gottesdienst, which he finished in 1938 and intended to publish in seven volumes.

Before he was deported, Nadel was able to leave his large collection of old Jewish liturgical materials with a non-Jewish neighbor, some of which survived and were purchased by his friend Eric Mandell. What remains of these materials is held at Gratz College in Philadelphia.

== Personal life ==
Nadel was married to Beate Anna Nadel.

He was a resident of Schöneberg quarter of Berlin. In November 1938, he was sent to the Sachsenhausen concentration camp. Although Nadel was lucky enough to get papers to leave for England, he was too frail to make the trip. In March 1943, he and his wife were deported to the Auschwitz extermination camp. He died there the same year.

== Published works ==
- Nadel, Arno. Aus vorletzten und letzten Gründen. Berlin: E. Fleischel, 1909. OCLC 682433165
- Nadel, Arno. Cagliostro drama in fünf akten. Berlin: Neuer deutscher Verlag, 1913. OCLC 682330202
- Nadel, Arno. Um dieses alles Gedichte. München: G. Müller, 1914. OCLC 682313577
- Nadel, Arno. Adam Drama in einem Vorspiel und vier Akten. Leipzig: Insel, 1917. OCLC 682303583
- Nadel, Arno, and Jacob Steinhardt. Jacob Steinhart. Berlin: Verlag Neue Kunsthandlung, 1920. OCLC 685193982
- Budko, Joseph, and Arno Nadel. Das Jahr des Juden : zwoelf Gedichte zu zwoelf Radierungen. Berlin: Verlag fuer juedische Kunst und Kultur Fritz Gurlitt, 1920. OCLC 705017148
- Nadel, Arno, and Jacob Steinhardt. "Rot und glühend ist das Auge des Juden" gedichte zu 8 Radierungen von Jacob Steinhart. Berlin: Verlag für Jüdische Kunst und Kultur, F. Gurlitt, 1920. OCLC 902609924
- Nadel, Arno. Der Sündenfall sieben biblische Szenen. Berlin: Jüdischer Verlag, 1920. OCLC 682344727
- Nadel, Arno, and Felix Stössinger. Der Ton. Leipzig: Insel-verlag, 1921. OCLC 678886186
- Nadel, Arno, and Hans Steiner. Das gotische ABC. Berlin: F. Gurlitt, 1923. OCLC 72589681
- Nadel, Arno. Heiliges Proletariat: fünf Bücher der Freiheit und der Liebe. Konstanz: O. Wöhrle, 1924. OCLC 42729881
- Nadel, Arno. Die Erlösten 10 Totenmasken; Radierungen mit 2 Gedichten d. Künstlers. Berlin: Franz Schneider Verl, 1924. OCLC 72589687
- Nadel, Arno. Tänze und Beschwörungen des weissagenden Dionysos [Den Besuchern d. Balls d. Bücherfreunde übergeben, am 27. März 1925]. Berlin: Felix Stössinger, 1925. OCLC 72637320
- Nadel, Arno, and Ludwig Marcuse. Drei Augen-Blicke: der schöne Gottfried. Berlin: Düwell & Franke, 1932. OCLC 52951048
- Nadel, Arno. Das Leben des Dichters. Berlin: Numerierter Privatdruck, 1935. OCLC 54289486
- Nadel, Arno. Der weissagende Dionysos Gedichtwerk. Heidelberg: L. Schneider, 1959. OCLC 602948269

=== As editor ===
- Nadel, Arno. Jontefflieder. Berlin: Jüdischer Verlag, 1919. Musical score. OCLC 5161997
- Nadel, Arno. Jüdische Volkslieder. Berlin: Jüdischer Verlag, 1920. OCLC 6073584
- Nadel, Arno. Jüdische Liebeslieder (Volkslieder). Berlin: Harz, 1923. OCLC 727707155
- Nadel, Arno, Abraham Maurice Silbermann, and Erwin Singer. Haggādā le-yelādîm = Die Haggadah des Kindes. Berlin: Hebr. Verl. "Menorah", 1936. OCLC 247532872
- Nadel, Arno. Zemirōt sǎbat die häuslichen Sabbatgesänge. Berlin: Schocken, 1937. OCLC 72637318

=== Translations ===
- Lewin, Samuel. Chassidische Legende. Rathenau u. Horodisch, 1925.
- An-Ski, S., and Arno Nadel. Der Dybuk; dramatische legende in vier Akten. Berlin: Verlag Ost und West, L. Winz, 1921. OCLC 3801912

== Bibliography ==
- Kasack, Hermann. "Arno Nadel." Mosaiksteine: Beiträge zur Literatur und Kunst. Frankfurt am Main: Suhrkamp, 1956. pp. 243–248. OCLC 4347414
- Christine Zahn: Wer den Maler Arno Nadel noch nicht kennt, weiß von dem Dichter und findet in ihm den Musiker wieder. In: Juden in Kreuzberg. Edition Hentrich, Berlin: 1991. ISBN 978-3-894-68002-2 OCLC 25748171
- Jascha Nemtsov: Arno Nadel. Sein Beitrag zur jüdischen Musikkultur. Hentrich & Hentrich Verlag, Berlin: 2008. ISBN 978-3-938-48589-7. OCLC 370858319
- Lexikon deutsch-jüdischer Autoren. Band 17, de Gruyter, Berlin: 2009. S. 250–257. ISBN 978-3-598-44173-8 OCLC 644701917
- Kerstin Schoor: Vom literarischen Zentrum zum literarischen Ghetto: deutsch-jüdische literarische Kultur in Berlin zwischen 1933 und 1945. Wallstein, Göttingen: 2010. ISBN 978-3-8353-0656-1 OCLC 658004297
- Nemtsov, Jascha, and Jos Porath. Arno Nadel: His Contribution to Jewish Musical Culture. Berlin: Hentrich & Hentrich, 2013. English translation of 2008 book above. ISBN 978-3-955-65033-9 OCLC 869010240
