= Arno H. Luehman =

United States Air Force general

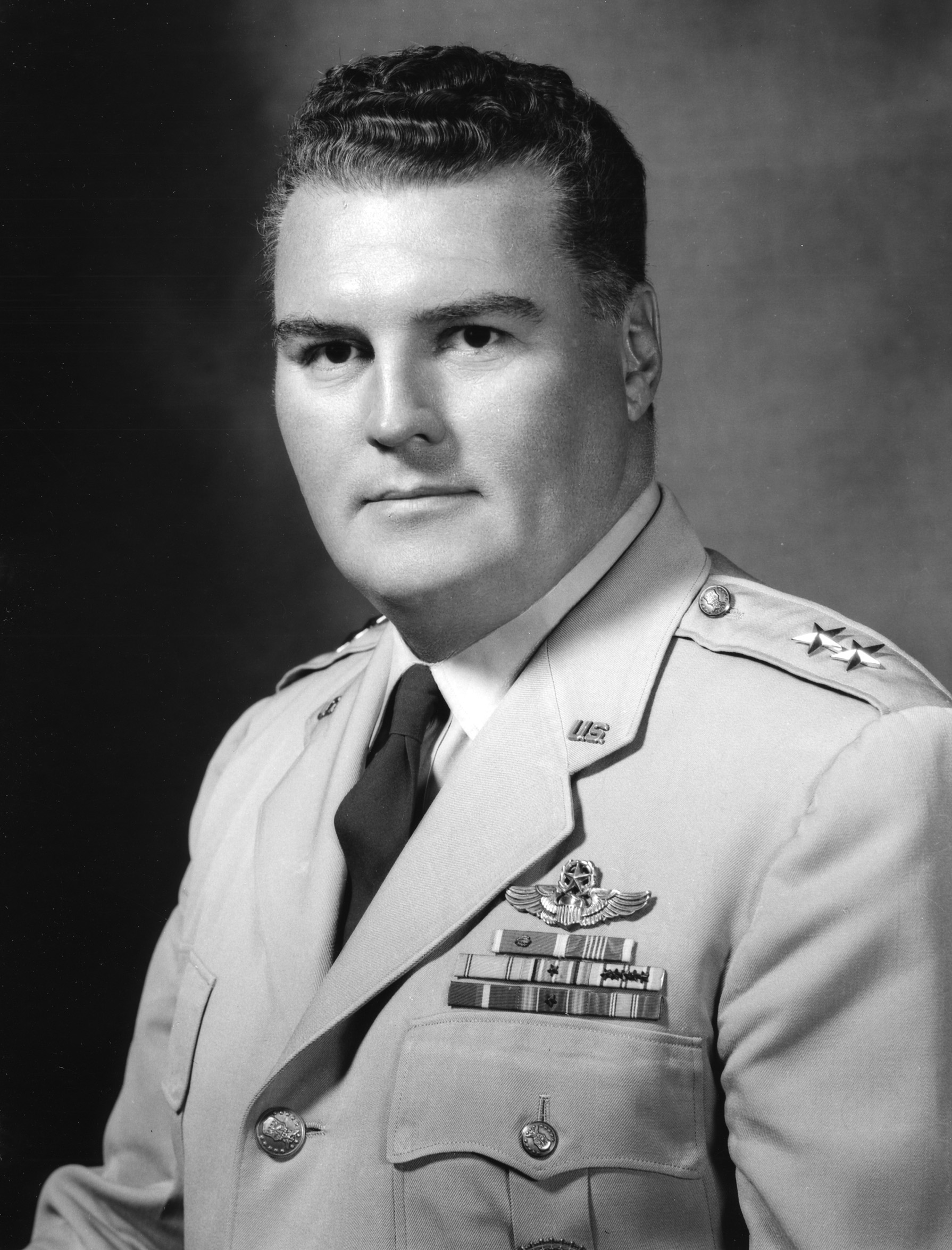
- Born: September 7, 1911; Milwaukee, Wisconsin, U.S.
- Died: December 5, 1989 (aged 78); Bethesda, Maryland, U.S.
- Burial place: Arlington National Cemetery
- Education: United States Military Academy
- Military career
- Branch: United States Air Force
- Service years: 1934–1966
- Rank: Major General
- Commands: Air War College; Sixth Allied Tactical Air Force; 3500th Recruiting Wing
- Conflicts: World War II
- Awards: Distinguished Service Medal; Legion of Merit (5)

Arno Herman Luehman (September 7, 1911 – December 5, 1989) was a major general in the United States Air Force.

== Biography ==
Luehman was born in Milwaukee, Wisconsin on September 7, 1911.

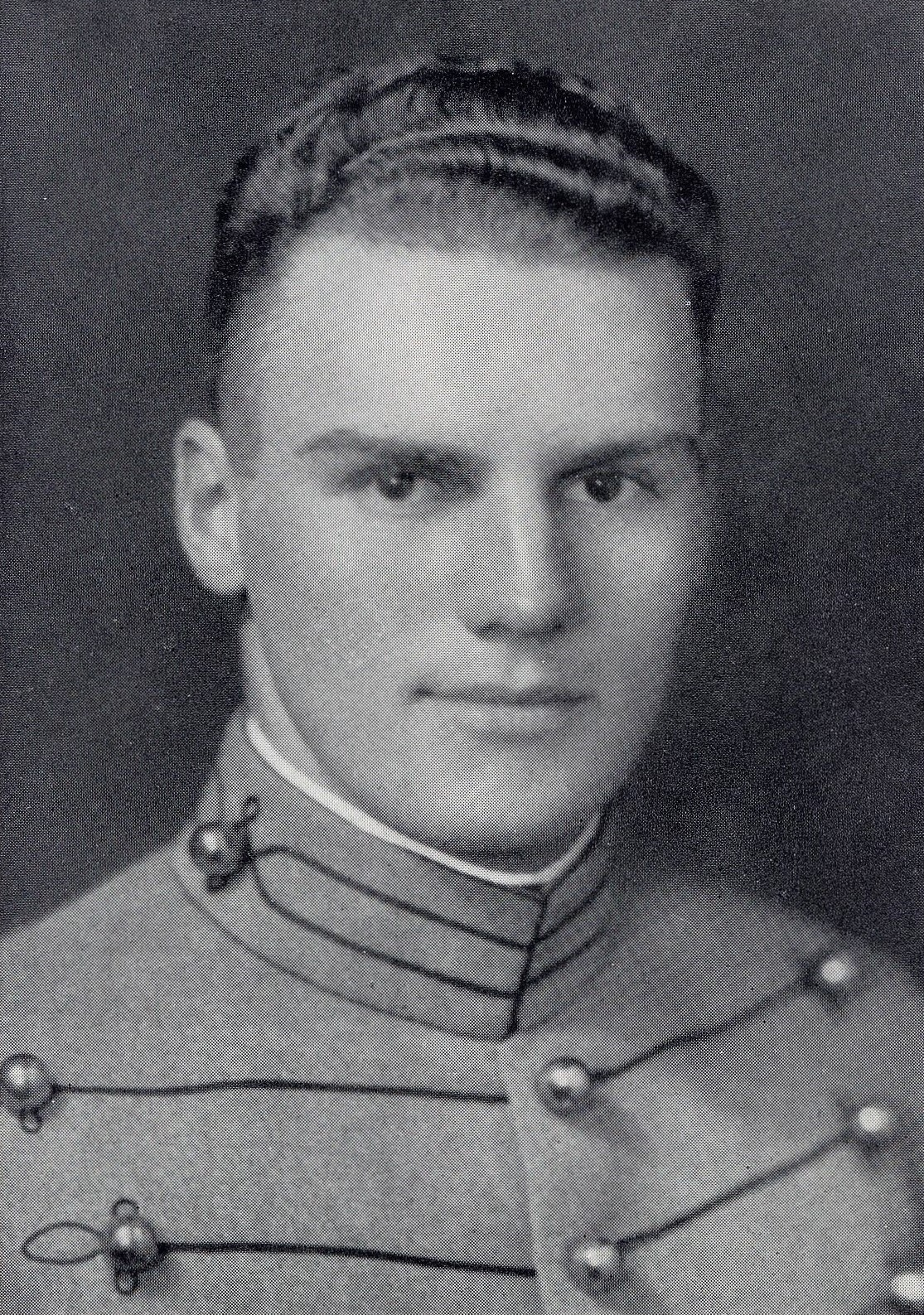
At West Point in 1934

Luehman graduated from the United States Military Academy in 1934. He graduated from Air Corps Flying School in 1935 and the Naval War College in 1942. During World War II, Luehman served as Chief of Staff of Operations of the Third Air Force and as Chief of Staff of the Thirteenth Air Force. Following the war, he was assigned to work on Operation Crossroads. Luehman then attended the Air War College. Later, he held a number of military positions at the United Nations.

In 1949, Luehman entered the National War College. Following graduation, he served as deputy director of Information of the Air Force until 1954. Luehman then served as commander of the 3500th Recruiting Wing until 1957, succeeding in increasing the number of Air Force recruits during that three-year period. From 1957 to 1962, he returned to Air Force headquarters as director of information. From 1962 to 1964, Luehman was commander of the Sixth Allied Tactical Air Force in İzmir, Turkey. In 1964, he became Vice Commander of the Air University and Commandant of the Air War College.

His retirement was effective as of September 1, 1966. Over the course of his career, Luehman received the Distinguished Service Medal and five awards of the Legion of Merit.

In 1976, Luehman moved to Potomac, Maryland. On December 5, 1989, he died from cancer at the Naval Hospital in Bethesda. Luehman was interred at Arlington National Cemetery.
