= Rob Claeys =

Belgian footballer

Personal information
- Full name: Robert Claeys
- Date of birth: 24 August 1987 (age 39)
- Place of birth: Kortrijk, Belgium
- Height: 1.86 m (6 ft 1 in)
- Position: Defender

Team information
- Current team: SW Harelbeke
- Number: 4

Youth career
- 1993–2002: FC Marke
- 2002–2007: KV Kortrijk

Senior career*
Years	Team	Apps	(Gls)
2007–2010	KV Kortrijk	9	(0)
2010–2011	Standaard Wetteren	14	(0)
2011–	SW Harelbeke		
- * Club domestic league appearances and goals as of 15 October 2015

Rob Claeys (born 24 August 1987 in Belgium) is a Belgium football central defender who currently plays for SW Harelbeke. He joined in 2002, from F.C. Marke. His debut for K.V. Kortrijk A-team was 2006.
