= Arno del Curto =

Swiss ice hockey player and coach

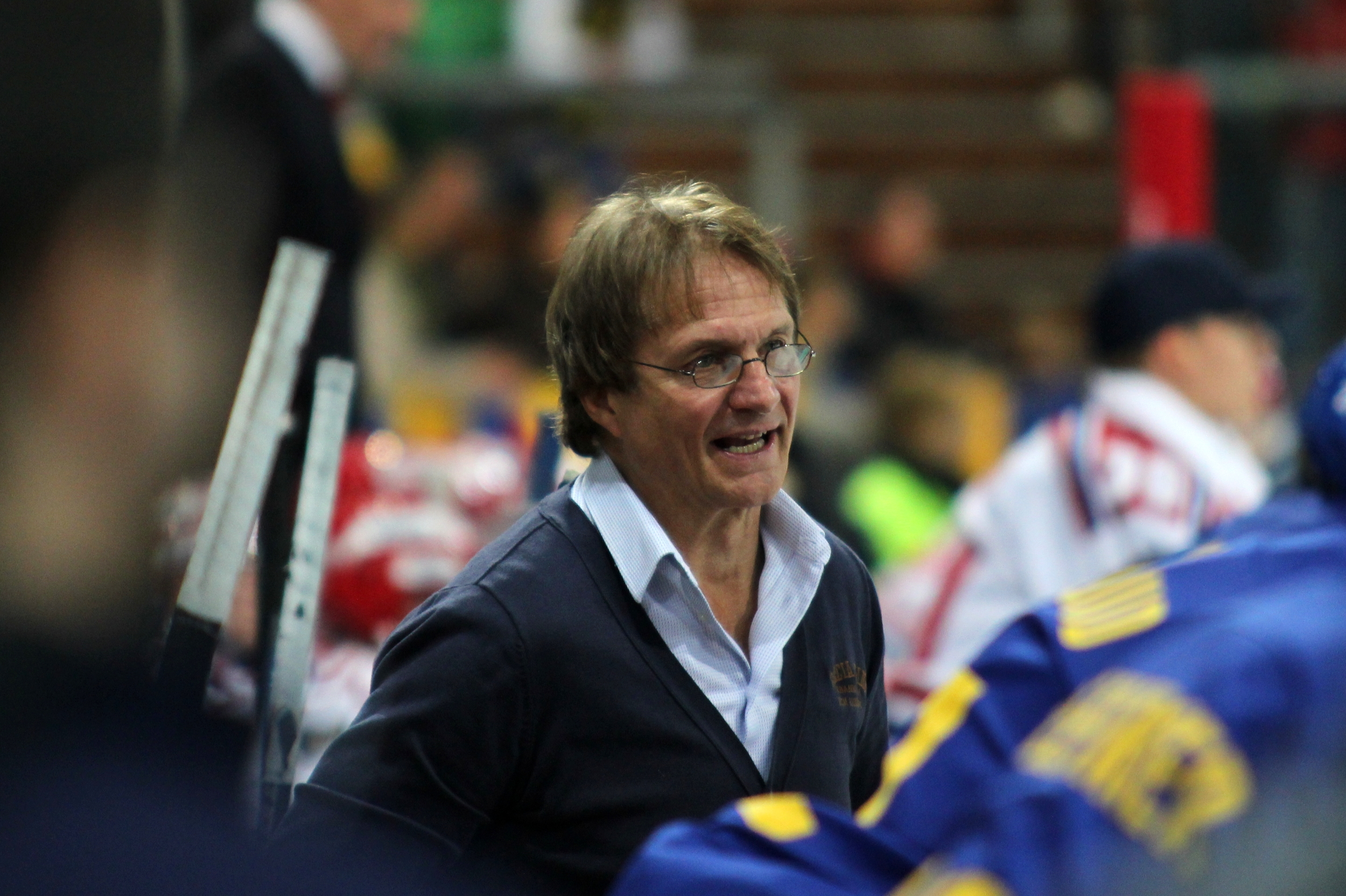
Arno Del Curto (2015)

Arno Del Curto (born 23 July 1956, in St. Moritz) is a former Swiss ice hockey player and coach. From 1996 to 2018 he was head coach of HC Davos.

Del Curto played for EHC St. Moritz and GC (now the GCK Lions) in the 1. Liga, the third-highest Swiss league, and for the ZSC Lions in the National League B. A serious ankle fracture forced a premature end to his playing career at the age of 21.

After Del Curto served as head coach for amateur club teams in Buochs, Reinach and Küsnacht, he took over a professional team for the first time in 1990 with SC Herisau in the National League B. The following year, he was hired by ZSC where he spent three seasons (1991–1993) coaching in the National League A. In November 1993 he accepted an offer to head EHC Bülach, and also coached HC Luzern and the Swiss U-20 national team over the next two years.

Prior to Del Curto's arrival at Davos in 1996, the team had not won a league title for many years. The once-proud club had even been relegated to the 1. Liga in 1990. Del Curto managed to change that by building a strong team year after year. His efforts resulted in National League championships in 2002, 2005, 2007, 2009, 2011, and 2015.
