= Arno Claeys =

Belgian footballer

Personal information
- Date of birth: 5 April 1994 (age 32)
- Place of birth: Belgium
- Height: 1.90 m (6 ft 3 in)
- Position: Centre-back

Team information
- Current team: KVK Westhoek
- Number: 4

Youth career
- 2002–2004: KFC Meulebeke
- 2004–2006: Izegem
- 2006–2007: Torhout
- 2007–2009: KFC Meulebeke
- 2009–2014: Kortrijk

Senior career*
Years	Team	Apps	(Gls)
2014–2016	Kortrijk	3	(0)
2016–2018	Eendracht Aalst	2	(0)
2018	→ Lokeren-Temse (loan)		
2018–2019	Lokeren-Temse	28	(5)
2019–2020	Knokke	2	(0)
2020–2022	Zwevezele	18	(0)
2022–2023	RFC Wetteren	8	(1)
2023–2024	SC Dikkelvenne	20	(0)
2024–	KVK Westhoek	19	(1)
- * Club domestic league appearances and goals as of 15:51, 21 January 2026 (UTC)

Arno Claeys (born 5 April 1994) is a Belgian professional footballer who plays as a centre back for KVK Westhoek.

== Club career ==
Claeys is a youth exponent from Kortrijk. He made his Belgian Pro League debut at 12 April 2014 against K.V. Mechelen in a 4–1 home win.
