= Greifswald Botanic Garden and Arboretum =

Botanical garden in Germany

Greifswald Botanic Garden
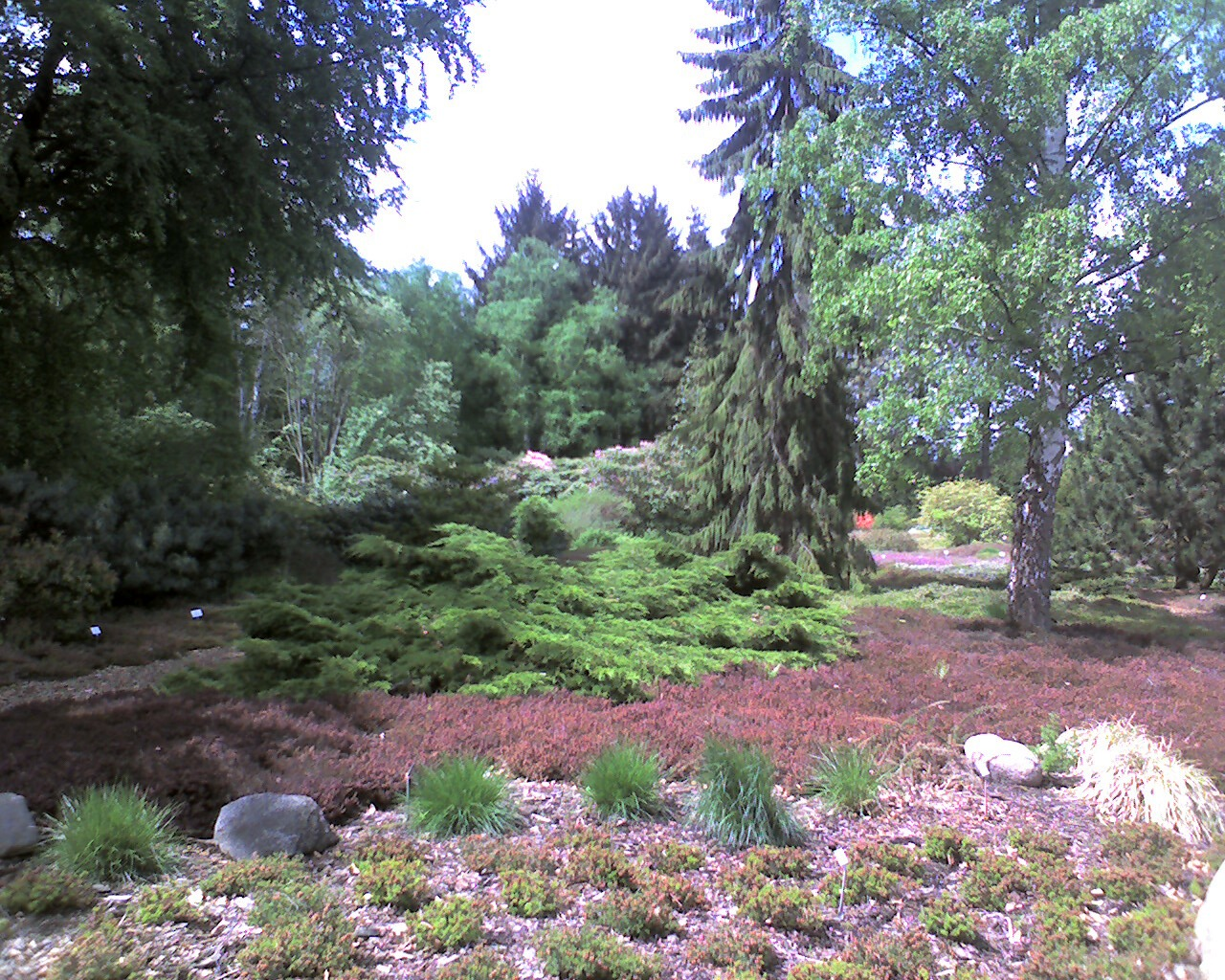
- The Arboretum
- Interactive map of Greifswald Botanic Garden
- Type: Botanic Garden
- Location: Greifswald, Germany
- Coordinates: 54°5′37″N 13°22′1″E
- Area: 9 hectares
- Created: 1763
- Operator: University of Greifswald
- Status: Open all year

Greifswald Botanical Garden and Arboretum (total area 9 hectares, German: Botanischer Garten und Arboretum der Universität Greifswald), was founded in 1763. It is one of the oldest botanical gardens in Germany, and one of the oldest scientific gardens in the world. It is associated with the University of Greifswald in Greifswald, Germany.

== History ==
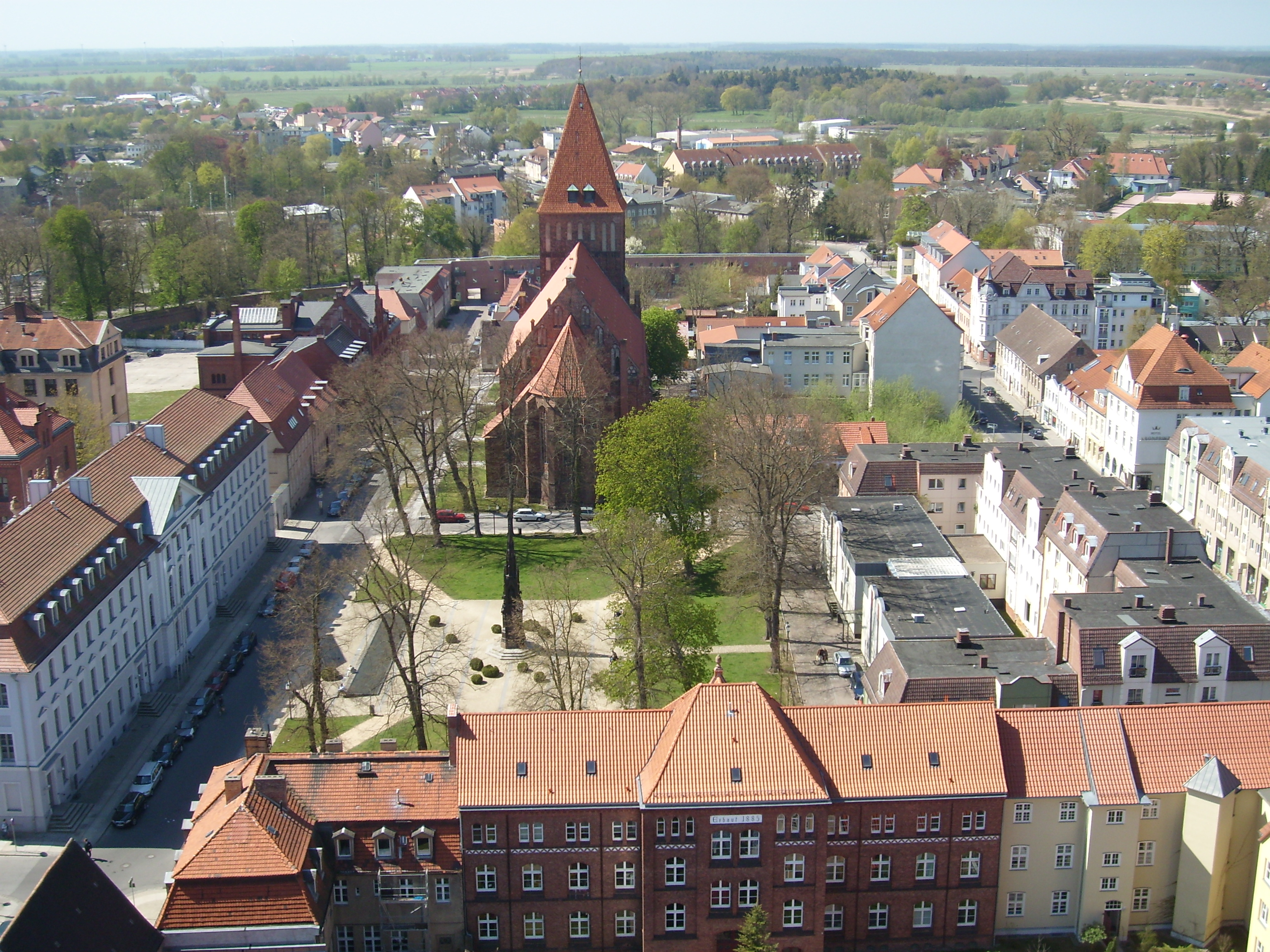
The Botanic Garden was formerly situated beyond the white administrative building on the left, but it was moved to its current place in the 1880s.

The Botanic Garden in Greifswald was founded in 1763 by Samuel Gustav Wilcke als hortus medicus, i.e. as a physic garden growing plants for medicinal research. Within a short period of time, the plants in the botanic garden served both a medical and a scientific purpose, and the garden was renamed to hortus academicus one year later.

Originally, the Botanic Garden was situated near the University of Greifswald's main administrative building, but extensive building activity in the 19th century made a relocation necessary.

Professor Julius Münter arranged for the move to a two hectare area west of the city centre, which was completed in 1886. Sixteen greenhouses are situated across the garden today, about half of which are open to the public.

The Botanic Garden and the Arboretum are used by the university and students for research and teaching purposes to this very day.

== Botanic Garden ==
The Botanic Garden consists of 16 greenhouses (German: Gewächshaus) and the adjacent outdoor area (German: Freiland). The total area of the Botanic Garden is two hectares. The Botanic Garden is located at Grimmer Str. 88. It contains about 7,000 plants.

== Arboretum ==
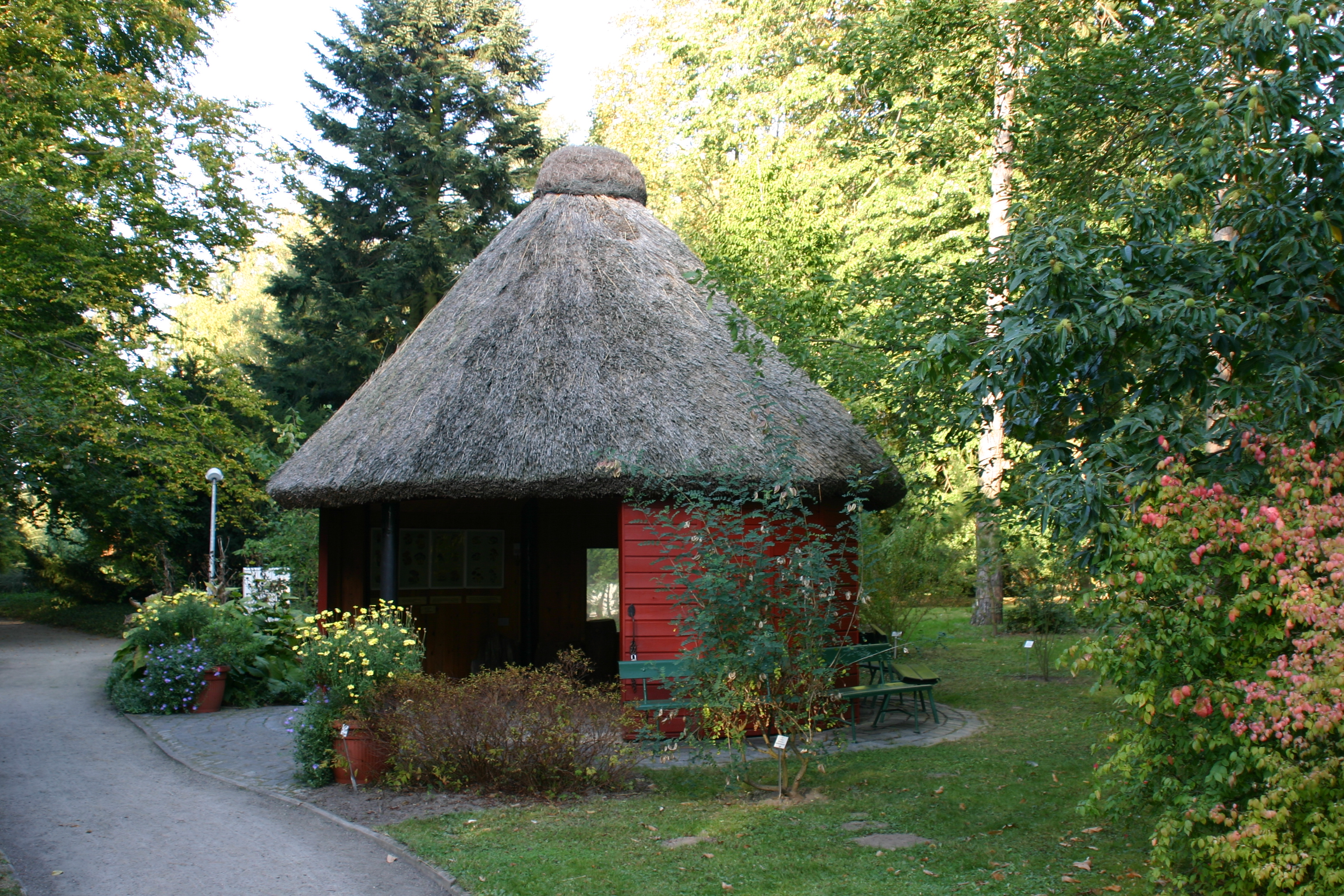
Pavilion in Arboretum, which holds changing exhibitions

The arboretum has a total size of seven hectares, and is situated at Friedrich-Ludwig-Jahn-Str., which is near Greifswald University Library and Greifswald University Hospital. The arboretum contains roundabout 1,500 plants and trees.

Opening hours as of 2016

- April: 9–15.45 Uhr
- May to September: 9–18 Uhr
- October: 9–15.45 Uhr

== Literature ==
- König, Peter (2017). Botanischer Garten Greifswald. Führer durch die Gewächshäuser, das Freiland und das Arboretum (in German) (2nd. ed.). Greifswald: Botanischer Garten der Universität Greifswald. ISBN 978 3 00 056769 8.

== See also ==
- List of botanical gardens in Germany
