= David Mevius =

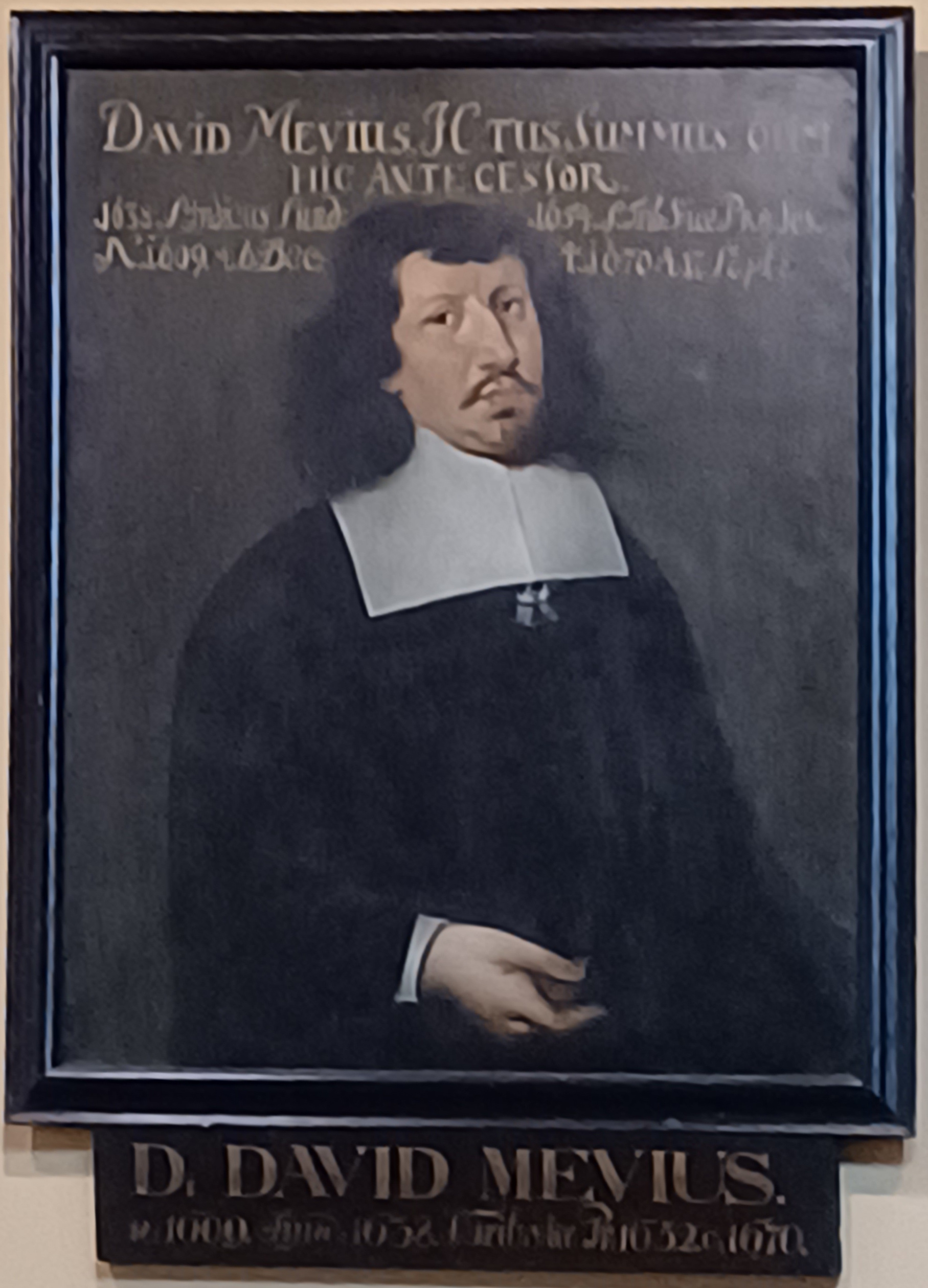
David Mevius

David Mevius (6 December 1609, Greifswald – 14 August 1670, Greifswald) was a legal practitioner and one of the most important lawyers of the usus modernus.

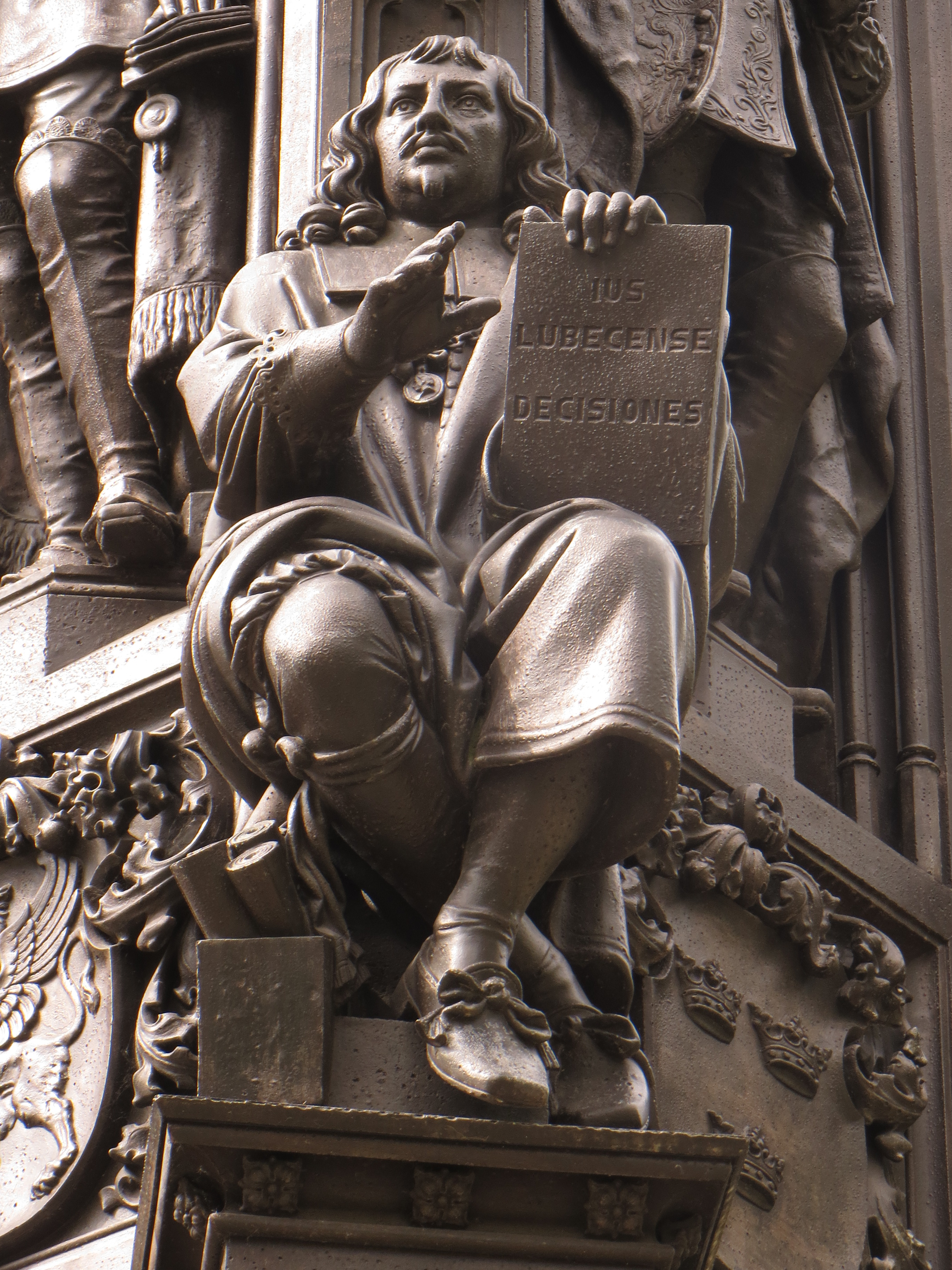
David Mevius statue symbolizes the Faculty of Law at the Greifswalder.

== Life and work ==
David Mevius was the second son of the Greifswald law professor Friedrich Mevius and his wife Elisabeth Rhaw. He received his first education at the Latin School in Greifswald and first attended the University in the study of theology. Soon, however, he turned to the Jurisprudence and studied from August 1629 at the University of Rostock. Later he undertook long journeys, also because of the misery in Pomerania during the Thirty Years' War. In 1635 he came to Greifswald, where at the law school a vacancy was vacant. At the end of 1636 he received the chair of Friedrich Gerschow, who died on 6 September 1635. Mevius became famous for his many years of work as Syndic of the city Stralsund, as author of the commentarius in ius lubecense (Commentary on Lübeck law) (1641/42) and several German-language writings on leases, serfdom and the legal status and tax exemption of nobility. As a trained lawyer and doctor of both rights Mevius appeared mainly as a legal practitioner in appearance.

After the Sweden occupation of Pomerania Mevius entered the diplomatic service of the Swedish Crown. In 1653 he became vice president of the newly founded Wismar Tribunal for the Swedish fiefs in the Holy Roman Empire in Wismar and thus in the jurisdiction of the court leader. He published a decision-making collection of the Wismar Tribunal (Decisiones) in six volumes. The progressive judiciary also comes from his pen. Further on diplomatic mission Mevius managed to settle the Electorate of Mainz "wildling" claim. Until his death in 1670 he remained vice president of the Wismar tribunal.

== Aftermath ==
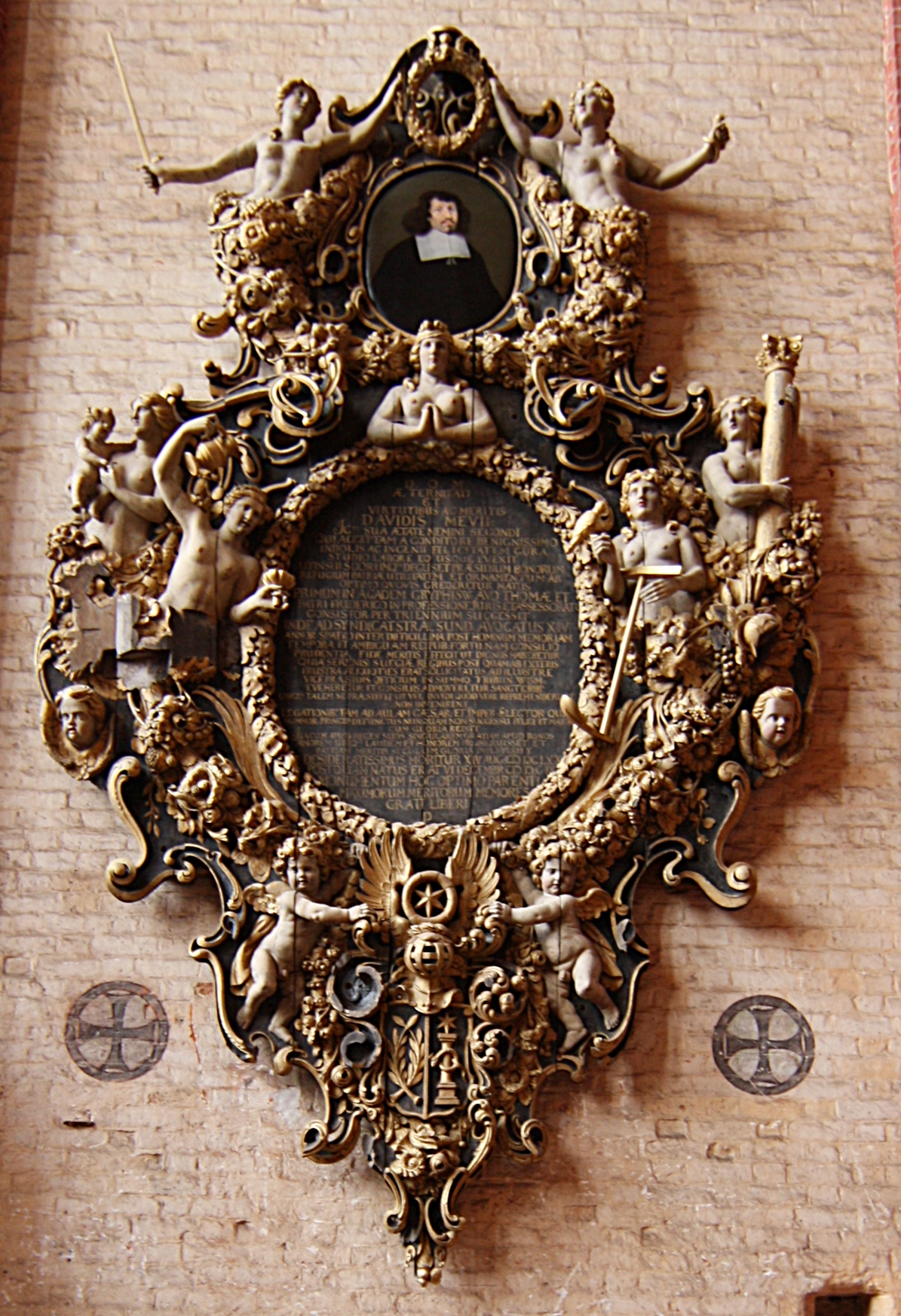
Epitaph for David Mevius

The decision-making of the Wismar tribunal, founded by Mevius - the Decisiones - was continued after his death and experienced until 1794 ten new editions. She had gained great authority in theory and practice. In addition, he wrote a codification of the Mecklenburg's land law, which already relies heavily on natural law foundations. In particular, his judicially practical activity was to shape the jurisprudence in Pomerania until beyond the 18th century.

The splendid baroque wooden epitaph of Mevius hung in the northern nave of the Wismar Marienkirche until after World War II. The church was badly damaged in an air raid just before the end of the war in 1945. It was blown up in August 1960. The epitaph was transferred to the St. Nicholas Church where it was extensively restored.

At the Greifswalder Rubenow Monument, a statue of Mevius symbolizes the Faculty of Law.
