= University of Greifswald =

Public university in Greifswald, Mecklenburg, Germany

- Universität Greifswald
- Latin: Universitas Gryphiswaldensis
- Motto: Wissen lockt. Seit 1456 (The Draw of Knowledge. Since 1456)
- Type: Public
- Established: 17 October 1456, Holy Roman Empire (teaching since 1436)
- Affiliations: CBUR, DAAD, DFG, EUA, HRK
- Budget: EUR 81.3 million
- Rector: Katharina Riedel (353rd)
- Academic staff: 2949
- Administrative staff: 3343
- Students: 10,291
- Location: Greifswald, Mecklenburg-Vorpommern, Germany; 54°5′41″N 13°22′29″E
- Campus: Urban
- Website: uni-greifswald.de/en

The University of Greifswald (German: [ˈɡʁaɪfsvalt]; German: Universität Greifswald), formerly known as Ernst-Moritz-Arndt University of Greifswald, is a public research university located in Greifswald, Germany, in the state of Mecklenburg-Vorpommern.

Founded in 1456, it is the fourth oldest university in Germany and one of the oldest universities in Europe, with generations of notable alumni and staff having studied or worked in Greifswald. Approximately two-thirds of the 10,179 students are from outside Mecklenburg–Vorpommern, including international students from 90 countries.

== History ==
=== 1456–1600: Founding ===
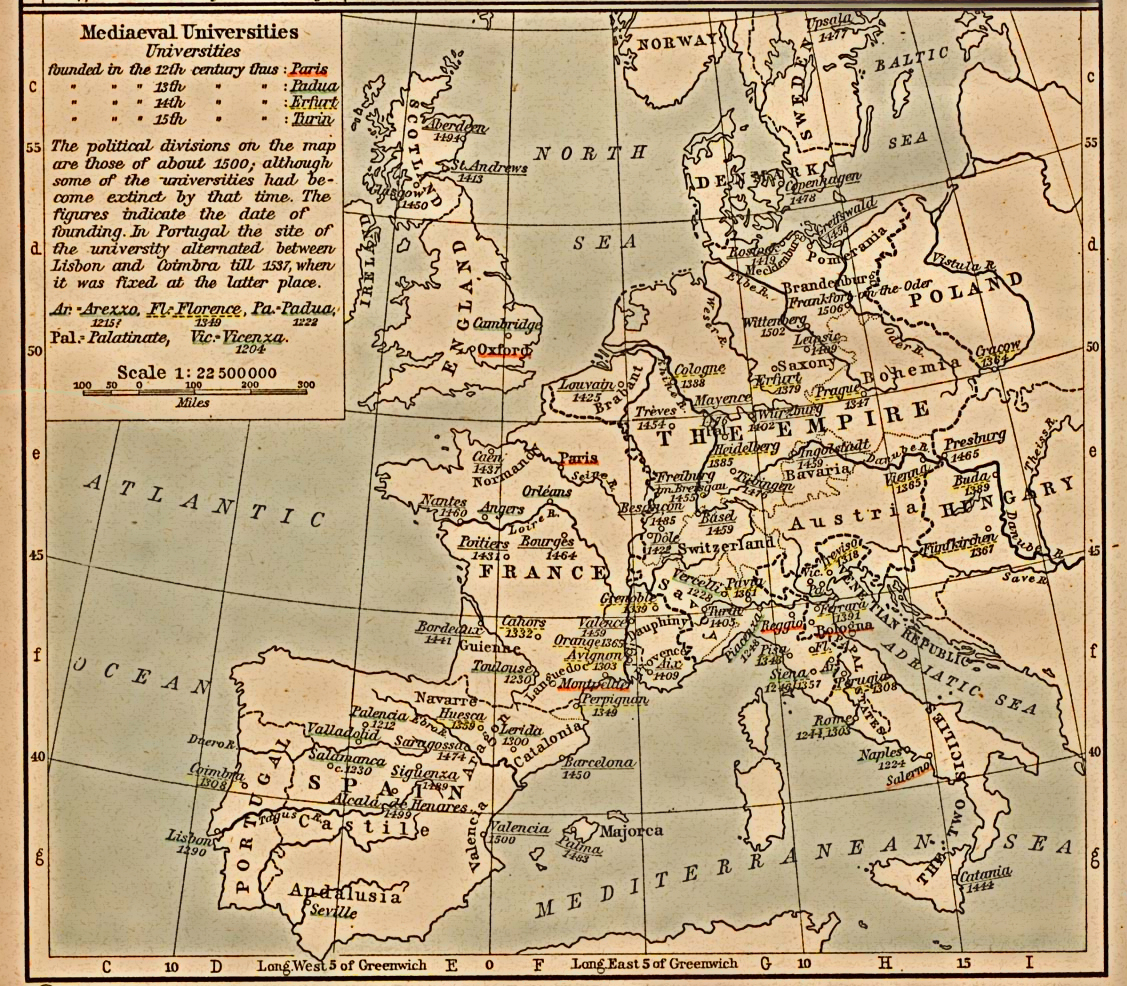
Map of medieval universities in Europe

The University of Greifswald was founded on 17 October 1456 with the approval of the Holy Roman Empire and the Pope. This was possible due to the great commitment of Greifswald's lord mayor, Heinrich Rubenow, who was also to become the university's first rector, with the support of Duke Wartislaw IX of Pomerania and Bishop Henning Iven of the local St Nicolas' Cathedral. The founding took place in the local cathedral, which was later remodeled by Caspar David Friedrich and his brother and can still be visited today. The founding of the university was made possible by a decree that restricted teaching activity at the University of Rostock (founded 1419). Several professors left Rostock for Greifswald to continue their work there, where Heinrich Rubenow took the chance of establishing his own university. Originally, the university consisted of the four traditional divisions: Theology, Philosophy, Medicine and Law.

In the late Middle Ages the University of Greifswald was one of the most important centers of science in the Duchy of Pomerania. The rest of Pomeranian schools – including those in Stettin and Stargard – did not have the university status in this time. Nowadays in Germany, there are only three older universities by count of the years of existence: the University of Heidelberg (established 1386), the University of Leipzig (1409), and the University of Rostock (1419).

International co-operation with other institutions of higher education in northern Europe existed already in the earliest years, sparked and accelerated by the transnational trading network Hanse. From 1456 until 1526, 476 Scandinavians were enrolled at Greifswald University and 22 faculty members as well as six rectors came from Scandinavia. This was a relatively high percentage compared to the total number of students at the time. Sources suggest a relatively segregated life of Swedish students in the primarily German university though.

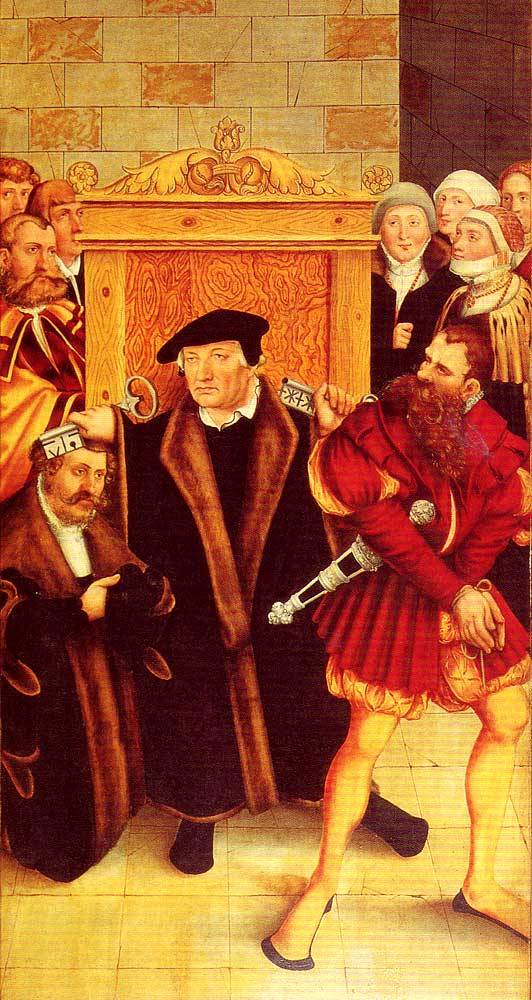
Johannes Bugenhagen during a sermon (part of an altar triptych in Wittenberg's church)

The early sixteenth century saw significant co-operation of the university, the Lutheran church, the city and the Duchy of Pomerania. Professors of theology simultaneously served as pastors in the three cathedrals. Professors of medicine usually served as personal physicians of the duke. Professors of law were also working at the local courts while professors of the faculty of philosophy usually taught the sons and daughters of the ducal family. The landed nobility also funded university-related purposes such as scholarships and student bursaries.

The Protestant Reformation was introduced at the university in 1539. Johannes Bugenhagen, an alumnus of the university, was an important figure during the German and Scandinavian reformation as well as a good friend of Martin Luther. After the secularisation of the monastery at Eldena near Greifswald, Duke Philipp I of Pomerania gave all revenue created by the now secularised Amt Eldena to the university. His successor, Duke Ernst Ludwig, began the construction of a college building, which could only be completed after his death. Duke Philipp Julius presented the university a gown that was used by the rector on ceremonial occasions up until very recently.

=== 1600–1815: Sweden ===
In 1604, the Greifswald University Library became the first centralised university library in Germany. The university signed a contract with a book printer from Wittenberg, Germany, for the amount of 2,000 Gulden. This contract lasted nearly a century due to the disruption caused by the Thirty Years' War (1618–1648). Hence, the university now owns prestigious early prints of authors and printers such as Johannes Gutenberg or Thomas Thorild. The phrase cuius regio, eius religio as applied to the outcome of the Protestant Reformation is attributed to the early seventeenth century jurist Joachim Stephani (1544–1623) of the University of Greifswald.

The Duke of Pomerania was in financial troubles and had not paid the professors. As a solution, he gave the Amt Eldena to the university – a total of 140 square kilometres of land.

After the Peace of Westphalia in 1648, the western part of Pomerania, including Greifswald and its university, became Swedish Pomerania — a fief held by the king of Sweden. From 1806 to 1815 it was formally a part of Sweden. Without entirely losing its character as a German university, it was heavily influenced by Swedish educational policies until 1815. Especially during the second half of the eighteenth century Greifswald was a cultural and scientific bridge between Germany and Sweden. More than 1,500 Swedes studied at Greifswald University.

The first university course in the English language in Germany was held in Greifswald in the year 1777.

The main administrative building – still in use today – was constructed between 1747 and 1750 by Andreas Mayer, a mathematician by profession, in the style of North German Baroque.

=== 1815–1933: Prussia ===
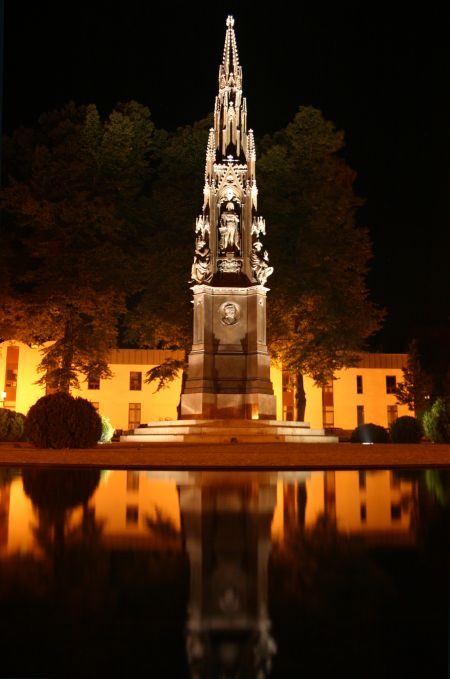
The Rubenow-Denkmal (Rubenow Memorial) was erected in 1856 for celebration of the 400th anniversary of the university in honour of its founder and first rector, Heinrich Rubenow.

When Swedish Pomerania became part of the Kingdom of Prussia in 1815, the University of Greifswald became the oldest university on Prussian territory. Prussia recognised the potential of science and universities, thus extensive building activity and growing financial support enabled the University of Greifswald to grow further both in size and reputation.

In 1856, on the occasion of the 400th anniversary of the university's founding, a monument was unveiled in the presence of King Frederick William IV of Prussia. The monument is still at its place, and was carefully restored for the 550th anniversary in 2006.

During the 19th century, Greifswald attracted many Polish students. After Breslau (now Wrocław, Poland) and Berlin, Greifswald hosted the third-largest group of Polish students in Germany.

The Faculty of Law became Faculty of Law and Economics when an economic department was introduced in 1905. In 1912, Otto Jaekel, a professor of paleontology in Greifswald, founded the German Paleontological Society. The Department of Modern Languages was established in 1853. To commemorate the 400th anniversary of the university in 1856, the "Rubenow-Denkmal" (Rubenow Memorial) was built in front of the main building, which is still there at its historic place. The Department of History was founded in 1863 as the first in Prussia and the fourth in all of Germany. The painter Caspar David Friedrich was born in Greifswald and received his first painting instruction by one of the university's members. Today the Department of Fine Art and Art History is named after him. He later painted several oil paintings with motifs from the region, including the one on the left.

The spectrum of academic research and teaching was further expanded during the Weimar Republic. The Nordisches Institut (Scandinavian and Finno-Ugric studies) and several other research institutes, e.g. for biological research, Christian archaeology, and Palestinian studies, were founded.

=== 1933–1945: Nazi Germany ===
In 1933 the university was named after Ernst Moritz Arndt, who was a student of theology in 1791 and later taught history at Greifswald. Here, he published his works "Versuch einer Geschichte der Leibeigenschaft in Pommern und Rügen", "Germanien und Europa" as well as the first part of "Geist der Zeit". The name was suggested by SA and Nazi Party member professor Walther Glawe. The university was gleichgeschalted and reformed according to military needs of the Nazis.

=== 1945–1990: GDR ===
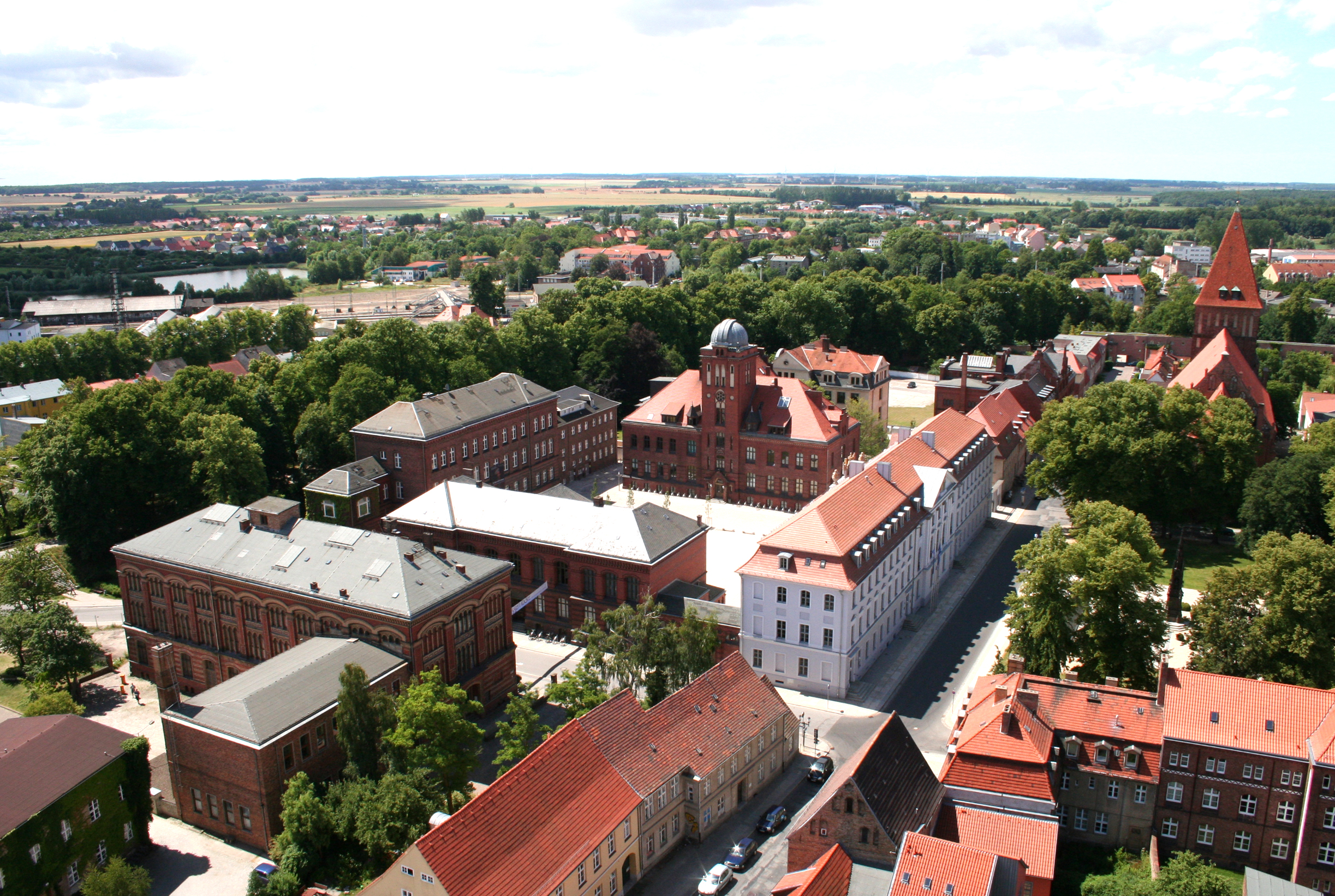
University of Greifswald, Old Campus

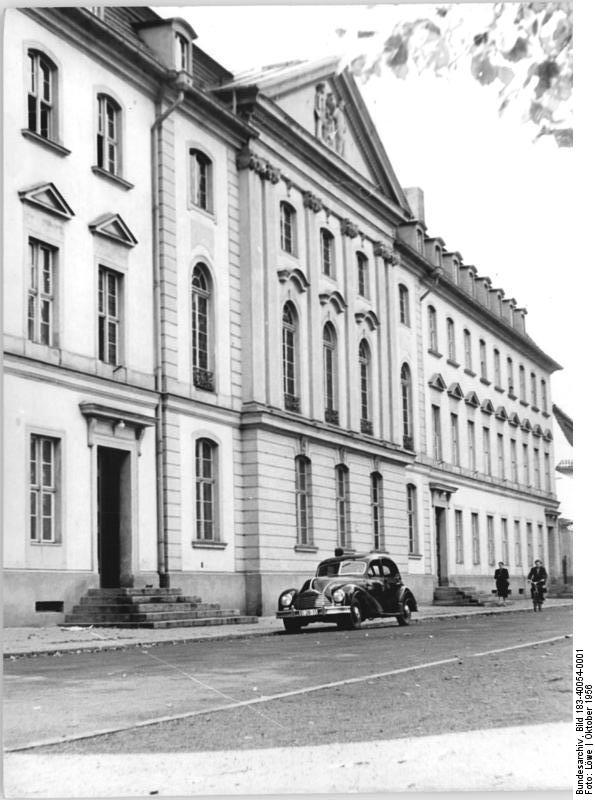
The main building on 8 October 1956, a few days before the 500th anniversary celebrations of the university

All academic activities came to a halt towards the end of the Second World War, and the university was re-opened on 15 February 1946. The name of Ernst Moritz Arndt was initially removed but restored in 1954. Several organisational changes were made during the time of the GDR, most of which were revoked in the 1990s after the German Reunification.

=== 1990–present: Germany ===
Freedom of science as well as the autonomy and self-administration of the university were re-established. The Faculty of Law and Economics was re-opened from 1991 to 1993. Extensive renovation has taken place since 1990. The dinosaur Emausaurus was named after the acronym of the university (Ernst-Moritz-Arndt-Universität Greifswald) in 1990.

Beginning in 1999, the University of Greifswald was among the first in Germany to welcome and introduce the international Bachelor/Master degree system as proposed by the Bologna declaration. The new system has replaced all former 4½-year "Magister" degrees in the arts and humanities and is set to replace the 4½-year "Diplom" formerly awarded in the sciences and in business too.

In 2006, the university celebrated its 550th anniversary with a large variety of events. The central ceremony – involving the re-opening of the university's renovated administrative building by President Horst Köhler of Germany, Queen Silvia of Sweden, and Minister President Harald Ringstorff of Mecklenburg-Vorpommern – took place on 17 October 2006.

Since the end of the GDR the University of Greifswald has undergone major construction efforts. Between 1991 and 2007, more than 417 million euros were spent on the careful renovation of historic buildings, as well as on the construction of new sites. For instance, 19th century lecture hall ("auditorium maximum") has been carefully restored, just like the university's main administrative building and many other buildings in the historic center of town. A new campus for natural sciences (physics, chemistry, biochemistry), medicine, IT and mathematics is under construction in the eastern part of the city. The new domiciles of Greifswald University Library, the departments of physics, biology and biochemistry have already been completed. The university hospital, which is thought to be completed in 2009, will be the most up-to-date full-scale hospital in Germany, adding to the appeal of the Greifswald Medical School. As a consequence of the construction of the new Greifswald University Hospital building, all historic 19th and early 20th century buildings that were formerly used by the hospital will be transferred to house other disciplines, thus creating an old-town campus for such departments as law and economics, the humanities and social sciences, and improving research and teaching considerably. As one of only 17 out of a total of 52 proposed building projects of "national significance" across Germany, the national government has agreed to subsidise the construction of a new pharmacology research lab (in Germany, education is usually cared for by the German states and not by the national government, which only supports a few projects of national and international importance).

Founded in 2000, the Alfried-Krupp Kolleg promotes the Universities international relations by awarding fellowships to Junior and Senior Fellows.

Following debates about the appropriateness of having the university named after Ernst Moritz Arndt, in January 2017 the Senate voted to remove his name from the official name of the university. Although the State of Mecklenburg-Vorpommern declared this decision void, a compromise was reached in which Arndt's name is removed from the official name, but can still be used under certain circumstances. As of June 2018 the name "Ernst-Moritz-Arndt Universität Greifswald" is no longer in use.

== Organisation ==
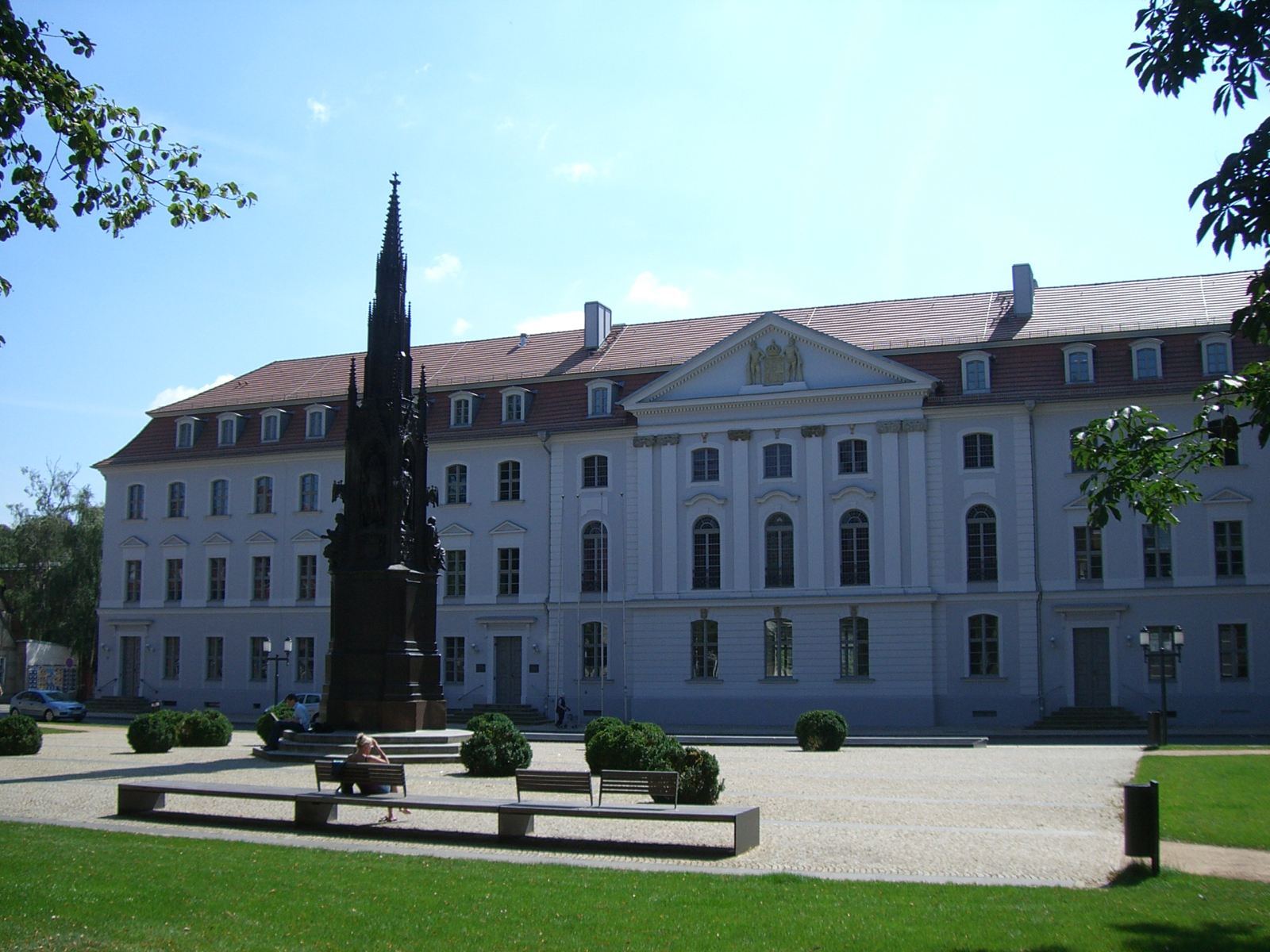
The Universitätshauptgebäude (university main building) – the seat of the rector and the administration

=== Central governance ===
The Rectorate, consisting of the rector, three pro-rectors, and the registrar, represents the university as a whole, sets the main guidelines development, distributes the finances, opens and closes study programmes, and appoints professors. The registrar is the head of the university administration, and manages the university's budget. The rector is elected by the Senate for a four-year term, the registrar for an eight-year term, and the three pro-rectors are elected to serve for two years.

The Senate is the second governing institution of the university. The Senate elects the Rectorate, and is itself elected by the members of the university, i.e. by students and members of staff. Senators serve for two years, student senators for one year. The Senate consists of academic staff members (divided into professors and non-professors), students, and non-academic staff members (librarians, administration officials, etc.).

Moreover, there is a University Council (Universitätsrat), consisting of six prominent members of the public who are elected by the Senate to advise the university in various ways.

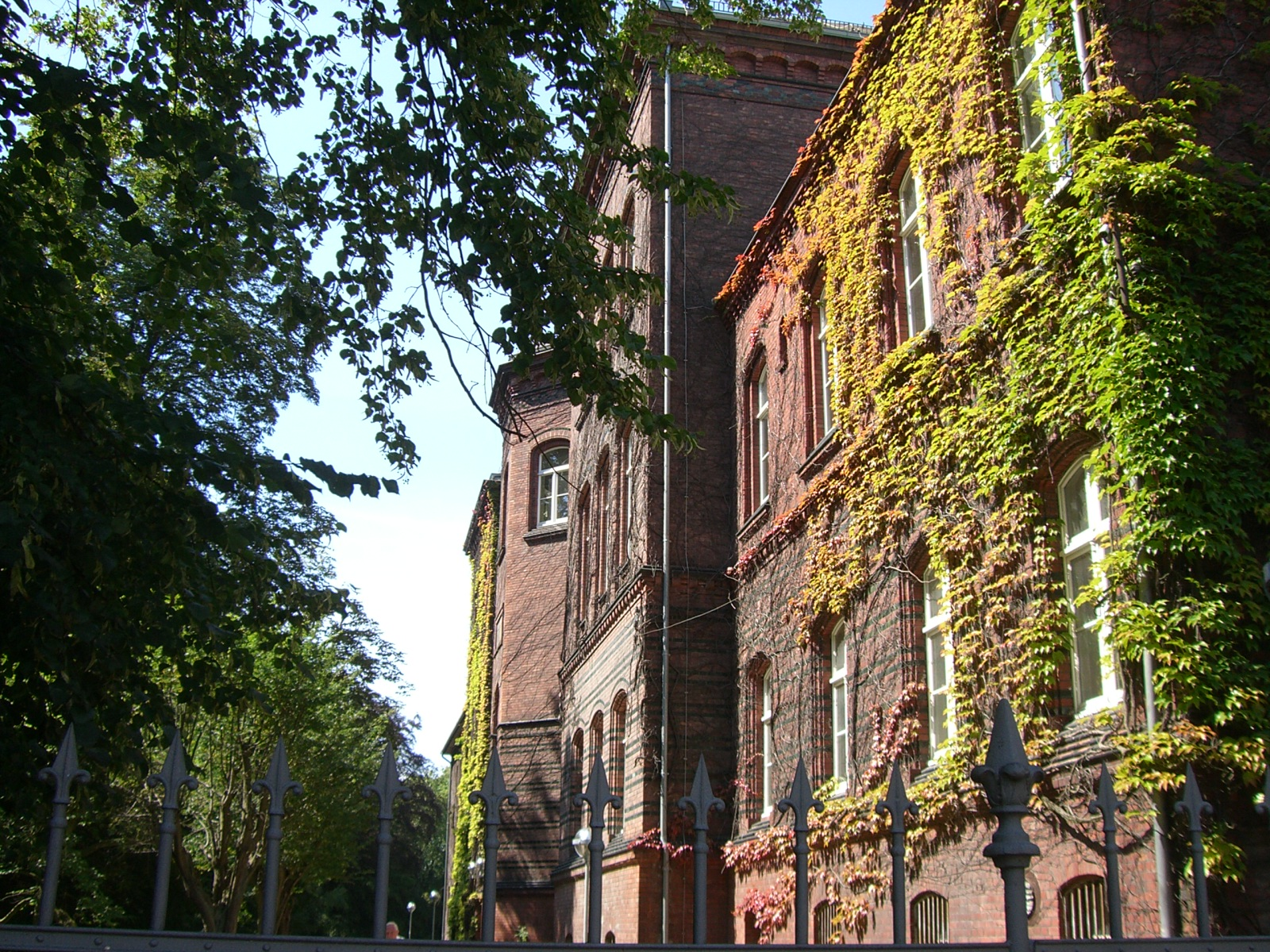
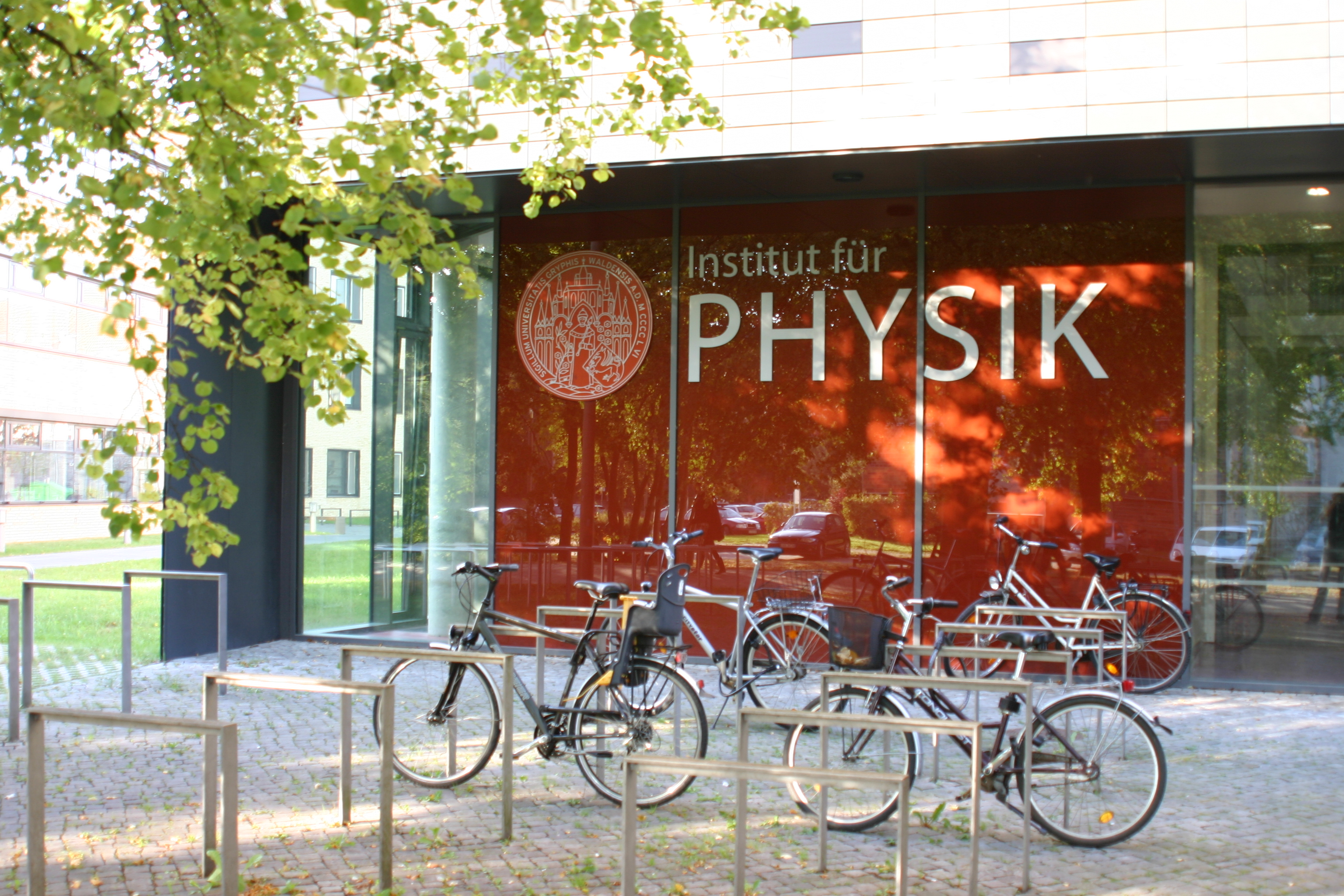
The old campus with its many historic buildings was mostly built during the Swedish and Prussian era, and the newly built Physics Dept is an example of the growing new science campus.

The Student's Union (AStA) and the Student Parliament (StuPa) represent the interests of the students.

=== Faculties ===
The buildings of the arts and humanities, law, business studies, and theology are scattered about the historic centre of the town of Greifswald. The newly built facilities for the natural sciences, mathematics, medicine, pharmacy, dentistry are situated to the east of the city centre, offering first-class research opportunities. Like many European universities, the University of Greifswald has five faculties (German: Fakultät) which are structured into departments, institutes, and chairs

==== Arts and Humanities ====
- Sacred Music and Musicology
- Fine Art
- German Philology
- History
- Modern Languages (including English, Baltic Languages, Scandinavian Languages and Slavic Languages)
- Philosophy
- Political and Communication Science
- Education

==== Law and Economics ====
Due to an education reform from 2013 in Mecklenburg-Vorpommern, Law can only be taught at the University of Greifswald. The Faculty of Law in Rostock had to be closed.
Undergraduate degree courses offered at the Faculty of Law and Economics include Business Administration, Law and Management and Law. Master students can enroll for courses such as Health Care Management and Business Administration.

==== University Medicine ====
The Medical Faculty at the University of Greifswald is among the best-ranked in Germany and the admission requirements are among the highest in Germany. Courses are offered in Human Medicine and Dentistry.

==== Mathematics and Natural Sciences ====
Courses are offered in biology, chemistry, biochemistry, geography, geology, Mathematics, IT, pharmacy, psychology and physics.

The physics department of the University of Greifswald, together with the Max-Planck-Institut für Plasmaphysik and the Leibniz Institute of Plasma Research and Technology, is a major international research hub in the field of plasma physics, attempting to solve future energy problems with the research reactor Wendelstein 7-X.Since 2007, the Department of Physics takes care of the construction of a space telescope called MuSTAnG (Muon Spaceweather Telescope for Anisotropies at Greifswald), which will be part of a worldwide network of telescopes in Japan, Brazil, Australia and Germany. The telescope will enable physicists and astrononomers at Greifswald University to forecast solar activity and has been co-funded by the European Space Agency (ESA) and the Deutsches Zentrum für Luft- und Raumfahrt. In addition to MuSTAnG, the university owns an observatory, which is taken care of by a private initiative and open to the public.

Greifswald offers two multi-disciplinary approaches to environmental studies, called landscape ecology and environmental sciences bringing together different disciplines such as biology, geography, economics, law, and ethics.The pharmacy department and the biotechnology department are also in the top group in Germany. The government-funded National Research Centre for Animal Disease on the Isle of Riems co-operates loosely with the university and is named Friedrich-Loeffler-Institut in honour of the university's former member of staff, Friedrich Loeffler.

The University of Greifswald owns a field station on the German island of Hiddensee.

Scientists from the university names a species of freshwater snail, Opacuincola gretathunbergae, after the climate activist Greta Thunberg.

==== Theology ====
The faculty of theology was founded when the university was founded in 1456. Notable theologians have studied or worked here, for example Johannes Bugenhagen who was a close friend of Martin Luther.

=== Library ===
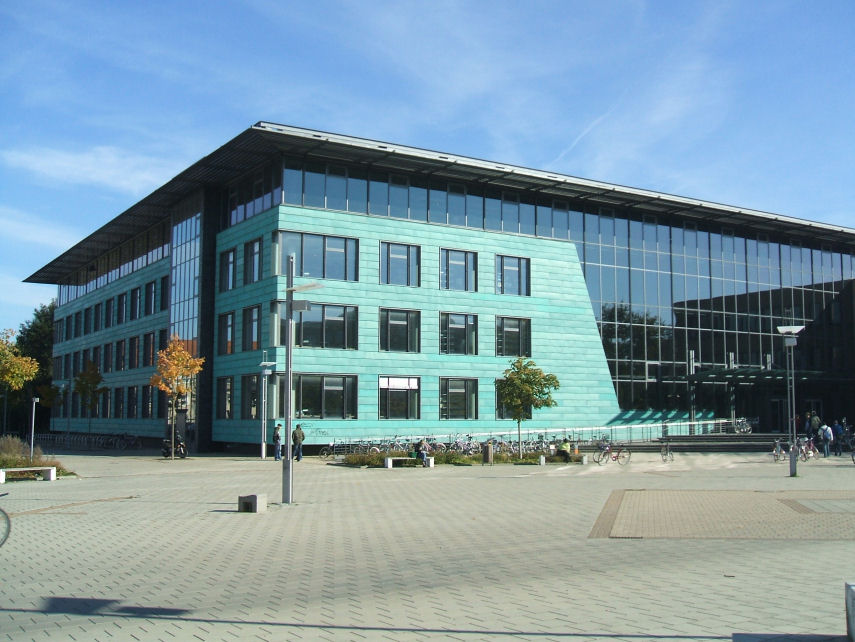
The new library is one of the constituent buildings of Greifswald University Library.

Greifswald University Library traces its roots back to the year 1456. In 1604, the first centralised university library in Germany was founded in Greifswald. Today, there are two main libraries, the Central University Library is situated on the Beitzplatz Campus and the Departmental Library can be found on the Loefflerstraße Campus. In addition to the main libraries, several departments and institutes have their own libraries (German: Fachbibliothek).

=== Academic year ===
As is customary in Germany, the academic year is divided into two semesters. The "winter term" (Wintersemester) lasts from October to March, and the "summer term" (Sommersemester) from April to September. During the winter term, teaching usually takes place from mid-October to the end of January – the remainder being reserved for exams and the writing of term papers. Teaching during the summer term lasts from mid-April to mid-July.

== Cooperation ==
Aside from teaching and research, one of major tasks of the university is cooperation with partners outside the actual university.

=== Research partners ===
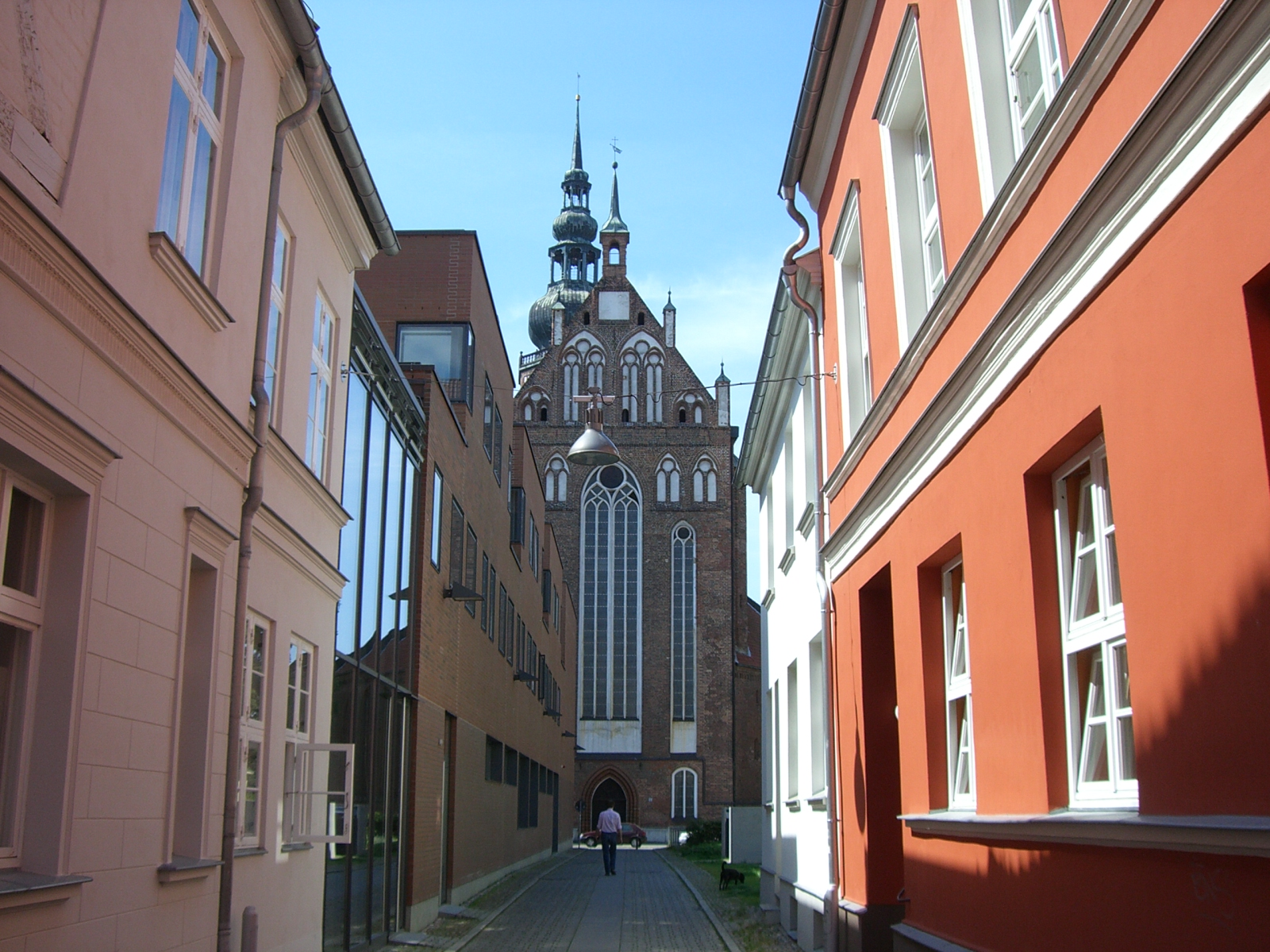
Alfried Krupp Institute of Advanced Study (left)

The university's research emphasis lies in the field of plasma physics, landscape ecology, medicine, biotechnology, the Middle Ages and the languages and cultures of countries bordering the Baltic Sea.

- Alfried Krupp Institute of Advanced Study (Krupp-Kolleg)
- Biotechnikum Greifswald
- Friedrich Loeffler Institute (National Research Institute of Animal Diseases), Riems Island (FLI)
- Leibniz Institute of Plasma Research and Technology (LIPT)
- Max Planck Institute for Plasma Physics
- Nuclear fusion research reactor Wendelstein 7-X
- Diabetes Research Centre, Karlsburg (near Greifswald)
- Siemens Public Networks, Greifswald
- Technology Centre Vorpommern
- Technologiepark (under construction)

=== International cooperation ===
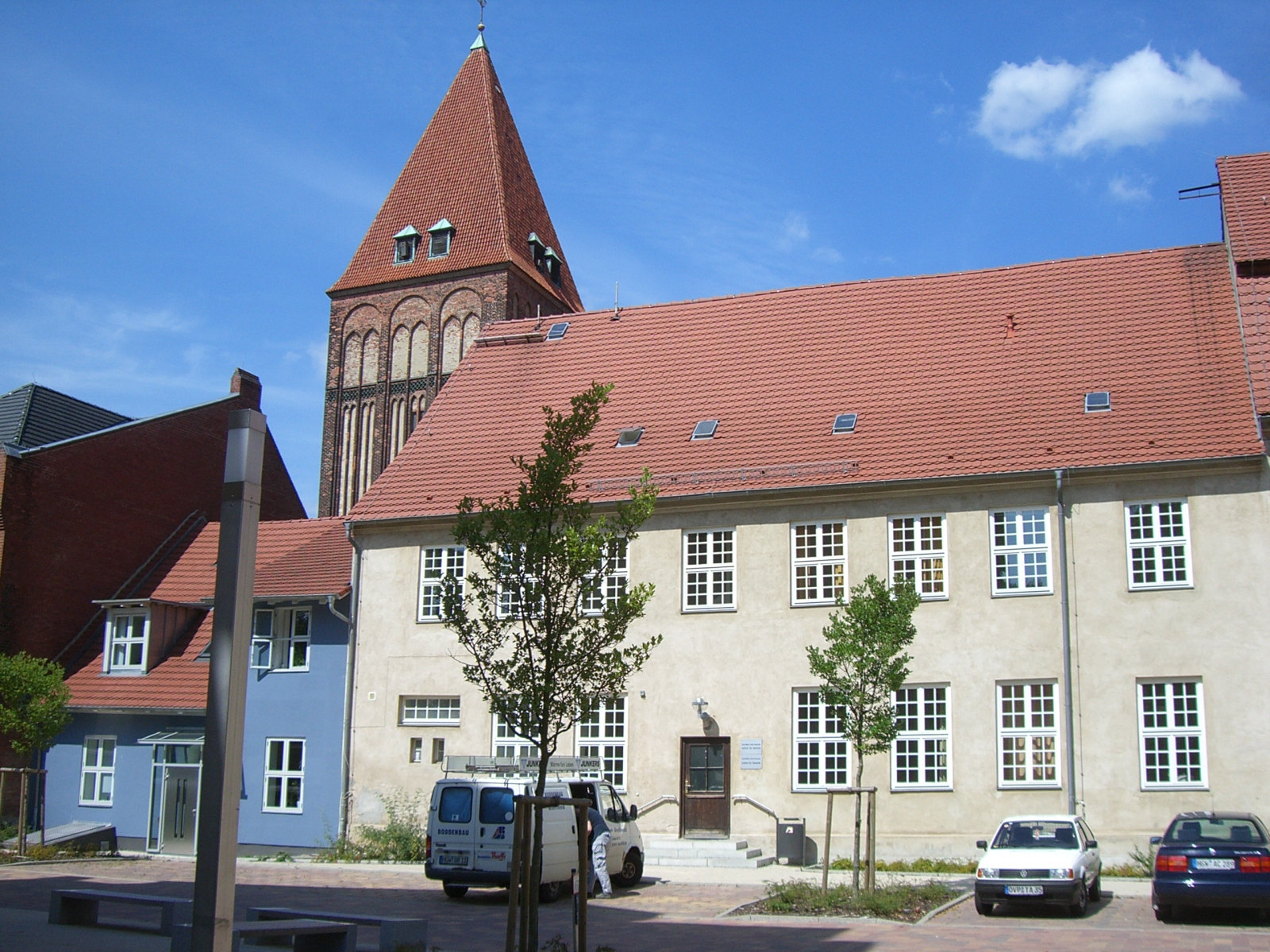
International Office (blue), Departments of Baltic and Slavic studies (grey)

The University of Greifswald aims to extend and efficiently use its international contacts. The primary geographic focus of international collaboration is Northern Europe and Eastern Europe, which is due to the university's research focus in this area. Partnerships with foreign universities to foster exchange of people (staff and students alike) and ideas is conducted in two different ways. Firstly, through official partnership agreements with foreign universities, which involves the entire university and most or all of her disciplines. Secondly, through contacts of professors, departments, and schools, which usually involves only one or few disciplines.

Student exchange from and to Greifswald is co-ordinated by the university's international office (Akademisches Auslandsamt). The University of Greifswald has signed several official partnership agreements with other universities to foster international co-operation through faculty and student exchange and academic co-operation. In Northern Europe, the university has signed partnership agreements with universities in Denmark (Århus, Holbæk), Finland (Joensuu and Kuopio), and Sweden (Lund). In Eastern Europe, partnership agreements have been signed with universities in the Czech Republic (Brno), Estonia (Tartu), Latvia (Riga), Lithuania (Vilnius, Klaipeda), Poland (Poznan, Szczecin), and Russia (Kaliningrad, Saint Petersburg). Exceptions are the University of Aberdeen as one of the ancient universities of Scotland, and the University of Padua in Italy. The university has also signed various cooperation agreements with universities outside of Europe, e.g. the University of South Australia, the University of Newcastle, Australia, Widener University in Pennsylvania, the University of Manitoba and the University of Saskatchewan (Canada), the National University of Singapore (humanities) or Berkeley (humanities) and the University of Illinois at Urbana–Champaign (United States).

In addition to official partnership agreements (see above) on the university level, there also numerous other channels of international contact on the level of chairs, departments or academic faculties, which often also include student exchange through the ERASMUS programme. Co-operation of this kind takes place with numerous prestigious universities, including those in Barcelona, Bergen, Gothenburg, Graz, Copenhagen, Lancaster, Oslo, Prague, Reykjavík, Stockholm, Southampton, Uppsala or Utrecht.

=== Public events ===
The university and its research partners regularly organise events for the general public, in the form of lecture series or public discussions. There is an annual "children's university" week as well as a family university, in which current trends in research are presented in a more popular form. Every semester, the student union organises a "24-hour lecture", in which university researchers, politicians, students and others present topics in short lectures starting at 6 pm on a Friday, and ending at 6 pm on the following Saturday.

=== Museums and university collections ===
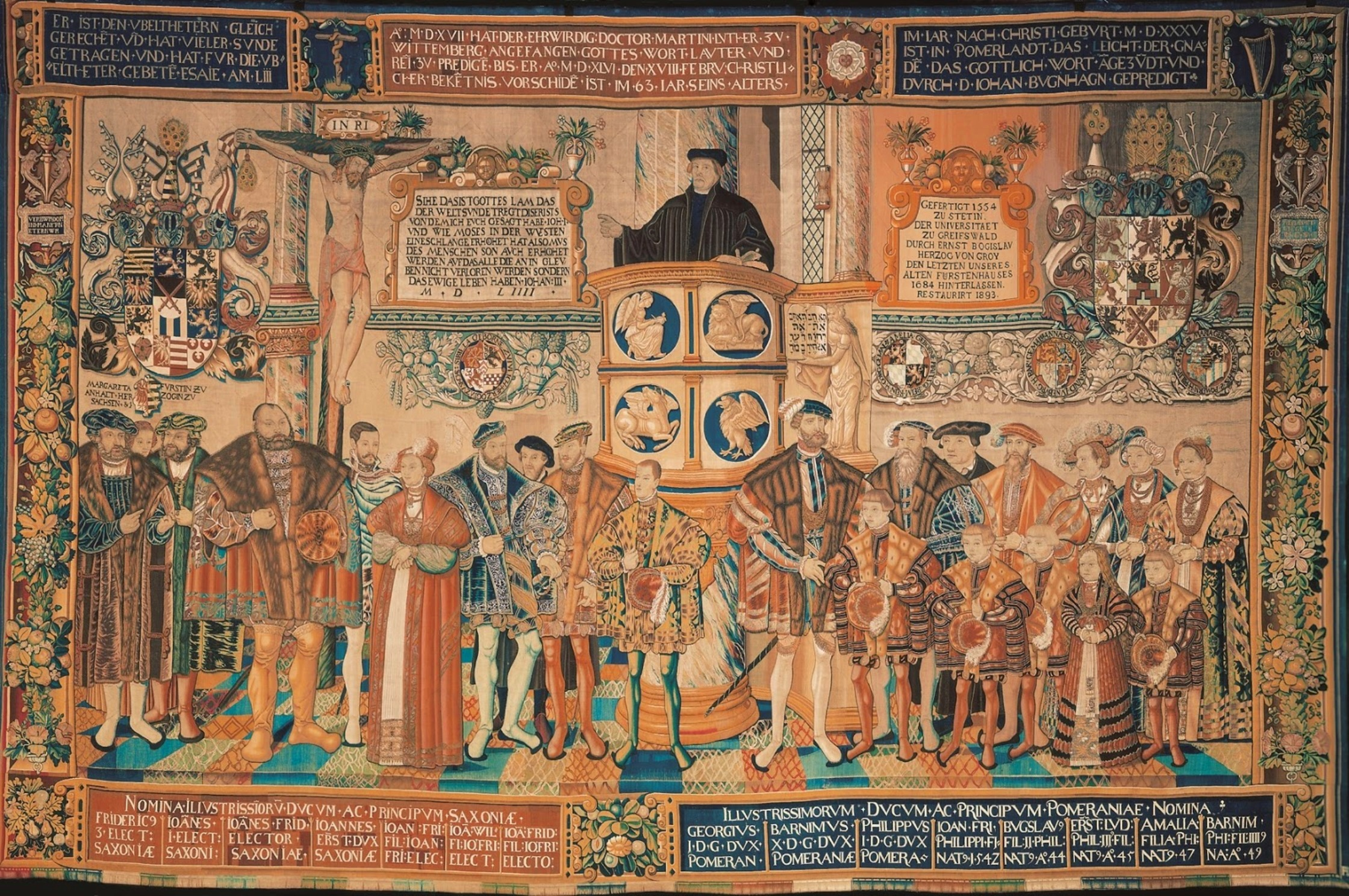
Croy tapestry

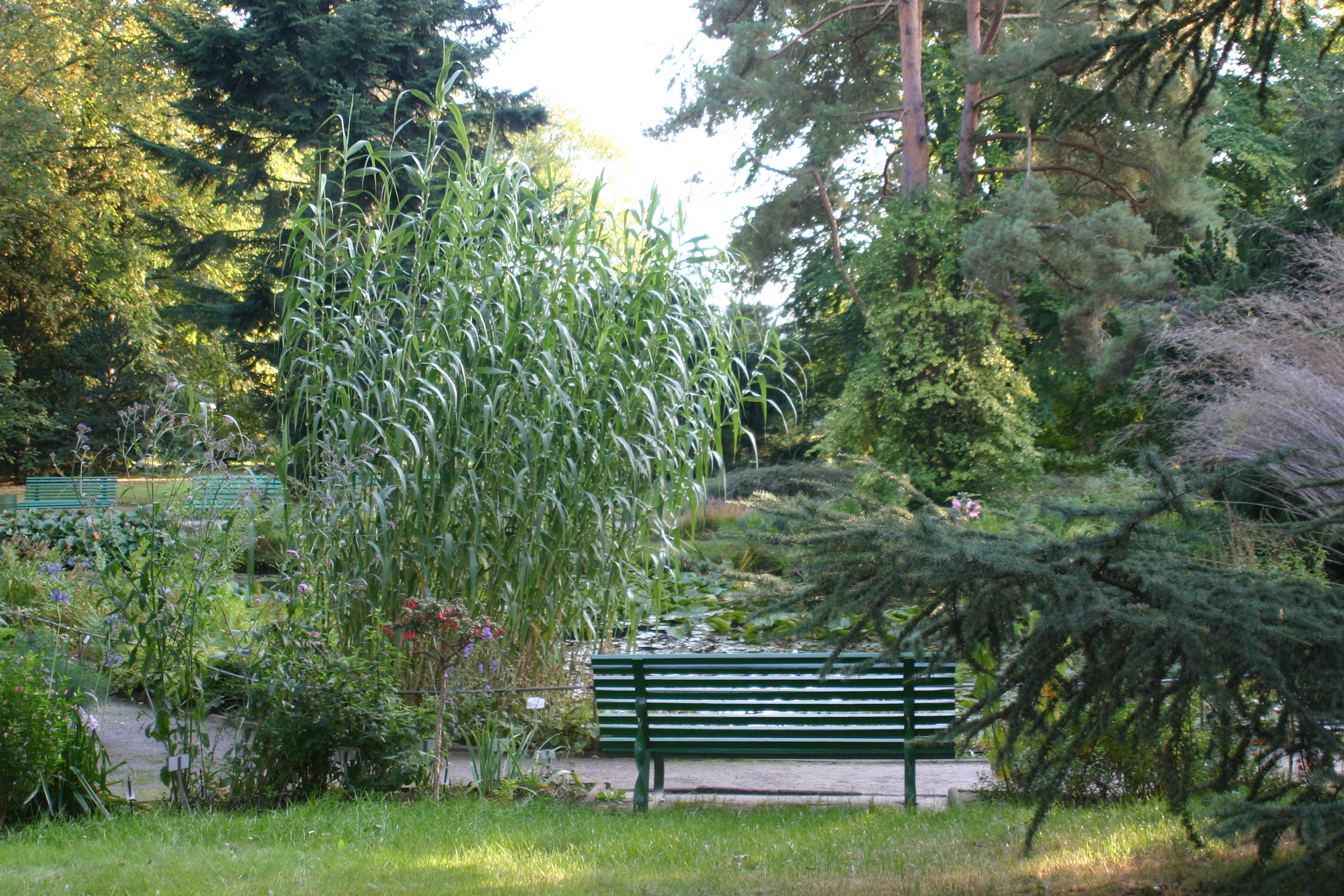
A pond at Greifswald Botanic Garden and Arboretum

Until post-World War II communist land reforms, the University of Greifswald was a large scale land owner and one of the wealthiest universities in Germany. It owned over 140 square kilometres of arable land, the revenue of which was the basis for its financial independence and wealth. Parts of the land that the university previously possessed have been given back to the university since the German reunification, but some claims are still pending in court. Today, the university again manages some of the land previously owned, including a large forest near Eldena that is open to the public, but the revenue is low compared to other sources of funding. The university-owned forest is administered by university foresters.

The former affluence of the university can still be seen in many historic buildings as well as a notable collection of art and other possessions. The university has some its artworks and possessions on display in museums across the country. Ernst Bogislaw von Croÿ donated the Croy Tapestry, a tapestry depicting the Reformation from 1554. The university also owns one of only four remaining 36-line Gutenberg Bibles from the year 1458. The university owns various paintings and other artworks as well as a great number of historic books, some of which are lent for exhibition to independent public museums. The University of Greifswald runs Greifswald Botanic Garden. It also has a few collections, some of which are open to visitors:

- Anatomical Collection (Anatomische Sammlung)
- Archaeological Collection (Archäologische Studiensammlung); Christian Archaeological Collection (Christlich-archäologische Sammlung)
- Botanical Garden (Botanischer Garten)
- Neonatological and Gynecological Collection (Geburtshilflich-gynäkologische Sammlung)
- State Geological Collection (Geologische Landessammlung)
- Graphic Collection (Graphische Sammlung)
- Gustav Dalman Collection (theology) (Gustav-Dalman-Sammlung)
- Herbarium
- Collection of Historic Maps (Historische Kartensammlung)
- History of Medicine Collection (Medizinhistorische Sammlung)
- Coin Collection (Münzsammlung)
- Pathological Collection (Pathologische Sammlung)
- Collection of Physics Appliances (Physikalische Gerätesammlung)
- Computer Collection (Rechentechnische Sammlung)
- Collection of Pre-historic Antiquities (Sammlung vorgeschichtlicher Altertümer)
- Zoological Museum (Zoologisches Museum)

== Statistics ==
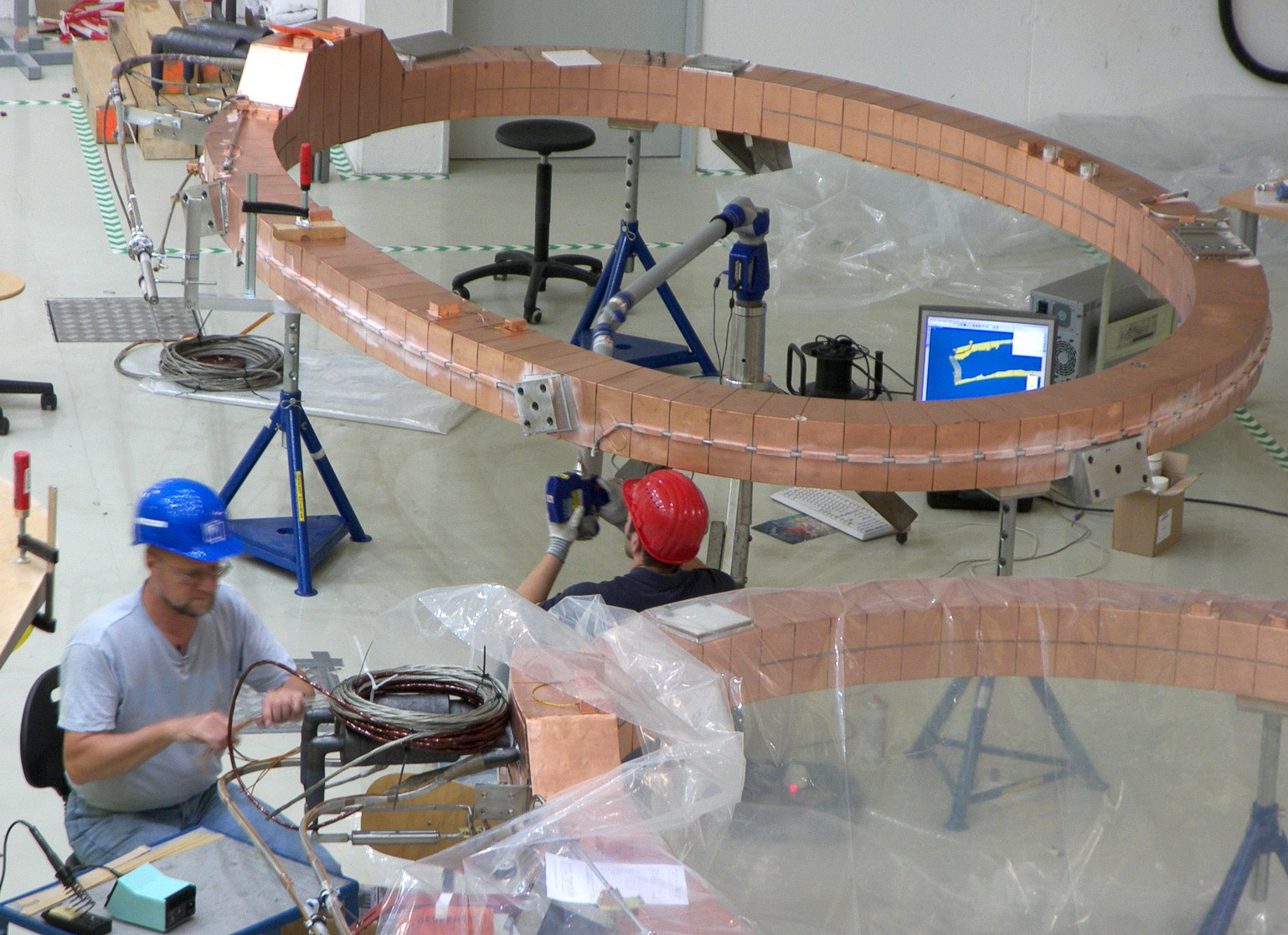
Scientists at the Max-Planck-Institut für Plasmaphysik in Garching and Greifswald are researching fusion reactor technology and are constructing Wendelstein 7-X.

=== Admission ===
The University of Greifswald is frequently described as one of the most popular universities for undergraduate admission in Germany, which is due to a very good study environment as well as a co-operative spirit between the teaching staff and students. Due to its small size, with only 10,179 students, the university is comparable to other small universities such as St Andrews or Yale.

=== Rankings ===
University rankings

Overall – Global & National
THE World 2024	401-500	37-41

In the Times Higher Education World University Rankings of 2024, the university is placed at 401–500th globally and 37–41st within the country.Today, the continued efforts to regain academic leadership are mirrored in national top placements, e.g. in the 2009 Die Zeit university ranking, in several subjects including for instance biology (2009), medicine (2009), geography, law (2008) pharmacy, psychology, dentistry (2009), and business administration (2008).

=== Student body ===
In the autumn of 2009, there were 12,500 students enrolled in Greifswald, i.e. a quarter of the town's total population of 53,000 were students. According to a 2008 study, Greifswald is Germany's 'youngest city', having the highest percentage of households by people under 30 years of age. In 2008, 59.4 percent of all students were female, the remaining male. Two-thirds of the enrolled students in 2009 came to Greifswald from outside the state of Mecklenburg-Vorpommern, and 5.3 percent were foreign nationals.

== Student life ==
Greifswald is situated in close proximity to the sea (near the islands Rügen and Usedom), about 200 km to the north of Germany's capital city, Berlin, and 100 km east of Mecklenburg-Vorpommern's largest city, Rostock. There are train connections, and high-speed autobahn links to Hamburg, Rostock, and Berlin.The city of Greifswald has several museums, a theatre and a philharmonic orchestra as well as a breadth of sports clubs and societies. A medium-sized convention centre called Stadthalle Greifswald exists.

According to a 2009 study, 44% of all people in Greifswald use their bicycle for daily transport, which is the highest such rate in Germany.

=== Athletics ===
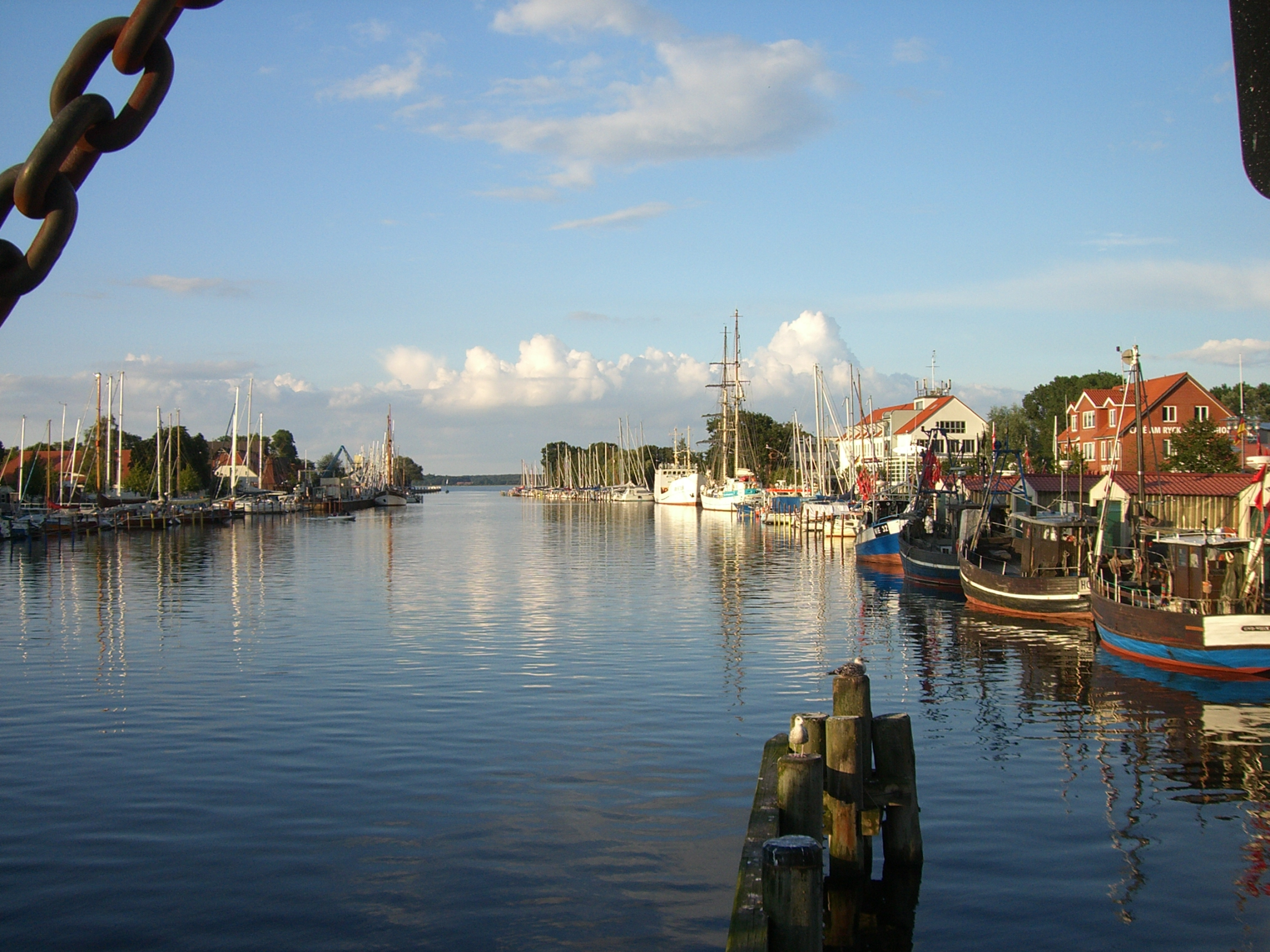
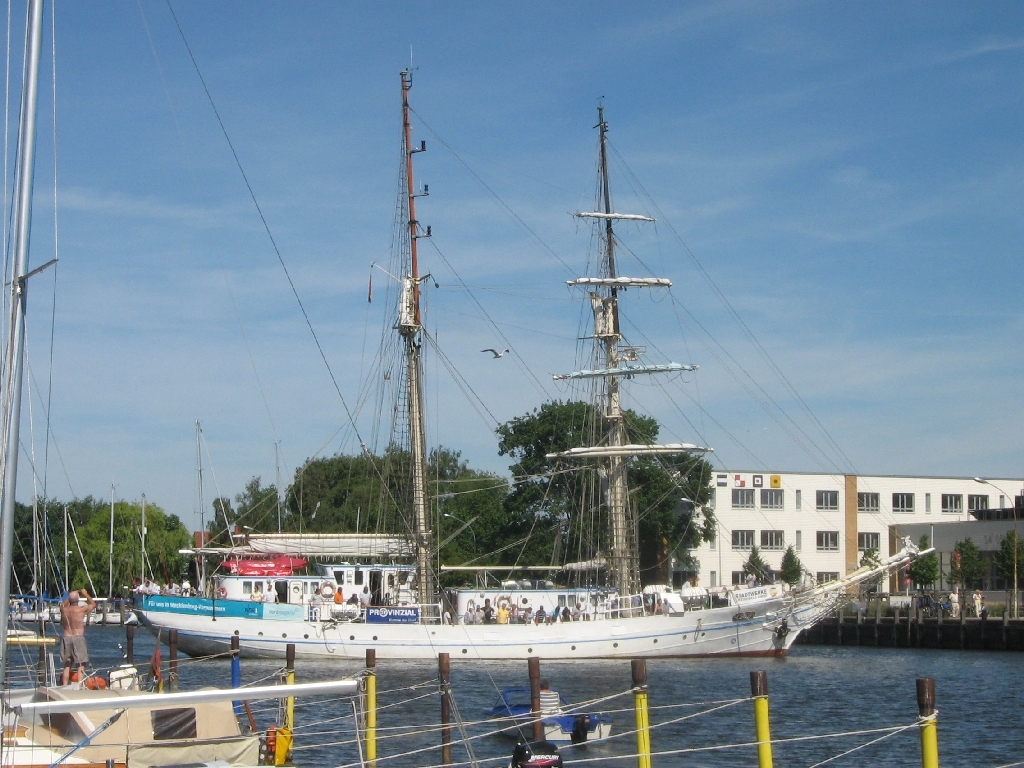
The Ryck river

The university's Hochschulsport (college sports) offers a wide range of opportunities to students who wish to do sports. Courses are available in nearly all disciplines, for instance aerobics, American football, football (soccer), dragon boat, fencing, handball, judo, karate, canoeing, lacrosse, rugby, surfing, diving, taekwondo, tennis, table tennis, volleyball or yoga. The regular local sports clubs are frequented by students, too.Greifswald is situated near the sea and the area between isles of Rügen and Usedom is among the most picturesque and best sailing and yachting regions in the whole of Germany. It is renowned for its steady winds.

There are a number of sailing and yachting clubs that are frequented by staff and students alike. There are two Sailing Clubs especially for students, the Studentischer Regattaverein, founded in 2007, which offers its Members a wide Range of Sailing Boats to take part in Regattas like Star, J/24, OK Dinghy, Europe, Vaurien, H Dinghy and a Nacra 5.0. The other one, being the oldest Sailing Club in Greifswald, is the Akademischer Seglerverein (Academic Sailing Club).

There is a golf club called Hanseatischer Golfclub which is popular with university staff and students alike. It hosts the annual Moritz Golf Cup.

=== Activities ===
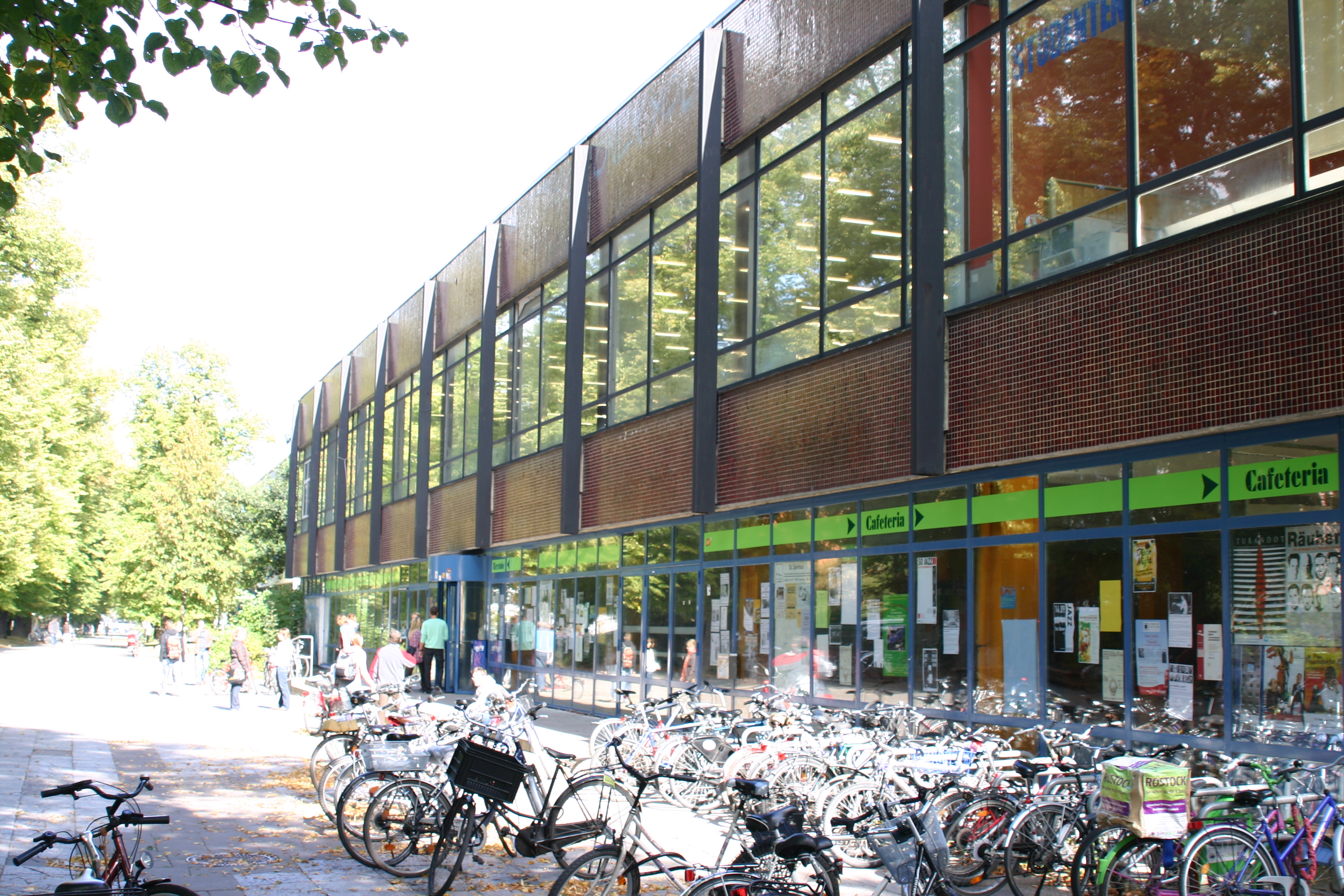
The old student cafeteria (Mensa) building, which also contains a not-for-profit student club

The student-run, not-for-profit clubs Mensaclub, Geographenkeller, Geologenkeller, Club 9 and Kiste are very popular and provide an inexpensive way of going out and meeting other students. There are several movie clubs who regularly show movies in German, English or in other languages. Apart from the localities that are run by students, there is an abundance of different pubs, clubs and restaurants.

For those wishing to attend music events, there are a number of concerts (rock, pop, etc.) in local pubs and venues throughout the year, as well as the annual "Bach Festival" called Greifswalder Bachwoche and the philharmonic concerts, open air operas and concerts, operas, theatre performances, and ballet are offered by the Theater Vorpommern.

Popular destinations for water- and beach-related activities during the summer are the nearby spa towns on the isles of Rügen and Usedom, e.g. Binz, Sellin, Heringsdorf. The coast of Mecklenburg-Vorpommern is one of the most popular summer tourist destinations in Germany.There is also a small beach in Greifswald-Eldena. The Stadtpark (city park) is situated to the northeast of the city centre next to a small zoo. The Ryck river crosses the city, and is only a 2-minute walk from the central market square. There are old boats, a pedestrian bridge and a few bars at the riverbank, which is full of students in the summer.

People who enjoy being outdoors make use of the fact that three of Germany's 14 national parks – Jasmund, Müritz and Vorpommersche Boddenlandschaft – can be reached within one hour or less from Greifswald.

=== Housing ===
As is customary at German universities, students are generally required to arrange for their own housing. There are a few low-rate student dorms in the town, however a large majority of students share private flats with a couple of other students (German: Wohngemeinschaft, abbreviated WG), or live in single apartments. In recent years, it has become increasingly difficult for newly matriculated students to find appropriate flats in Greifswald, which is due to a growing number of students and a stagnating market. As landlords often prefer their prospective tenants to be fluent in German, this may cause disadvantages for international students wishing to rent their own place. However, the university usually arranges dorm rooms for international students.

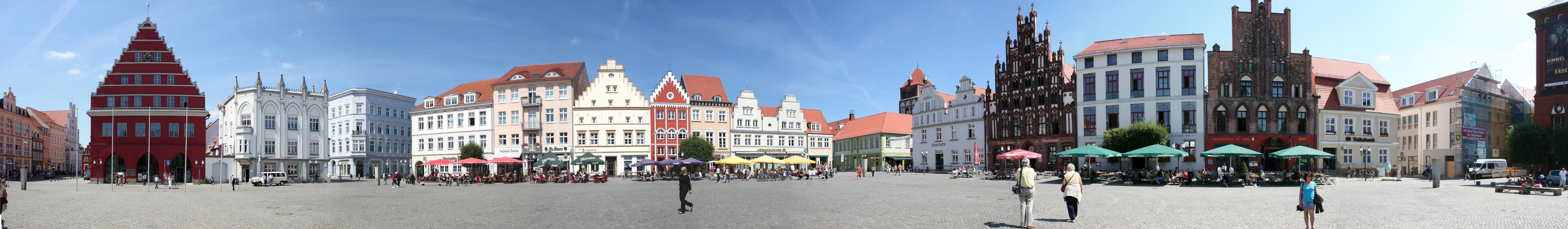
The historic market square with its pubs, cafés, and restaurants – the core of the city centre – is a popular place on a sunny day.

=== Societies ===
As in any other university town, there are groups and organisations of various colours, e.g. human rights groups, political or religious youth organisations, environmental protection groups, and the like. There is a local ESN chapter for international students. GrIStuF – Greifswald International Students Festival – brings together students from all over the world each summer to discuss, party and compete with each other.The AStA and the student parliament (StuPa) work to represent the interests of all students towards the university and society as a whole.

The following music groups are open to faculty and students, e.g.

- chamber choir
- cathedral choir
- university big band
- university choir
- university symphonic orchestra

Nordischer Klang (Nordic Sound) – an international festival of Scandinavian and Nordic culture – takes place each year in Greifswald and is actively supported by students and members of staff. Nordischer Klang introduces the cultures of Denmark, Finland, Iceland, Norway, and Sweden to the German public and is the largest festival of Nordic culture outside of the Nordic countries. It comprises lectures, movies, theatre performances, live jazz music, fine art and literature.

PolenmARkT (PolandmARkeT) is a German-polish festival taking place every November in the Hanseatic city Greifswald. It was created in 1997 to connect Germany and Poland – mainly in cultural aspects. It is organized by the PolenmARkT e.V. (an association) and a pool of volunteers. It was supported by the Embassy of Poland, the city Greifswald, the University of Greifswald and its students. Looking back at a 14-year-long period of growth it is one of the most important cultural events in the Hanseatic city. The organiserrs managed to establish the event sustainable into Greifswald's citizens interests.

There is a monthly student magazine called moritz-Magazin, which read by the majority of students and publishes stories not only about university politics but also about culture in general. A popular radio98eins local/regional radio station is operated mainly by students and presents independent music and local news. Students who wish to get experience in television may want to join moritzTV the student TV channel.

=== Fraternities ===
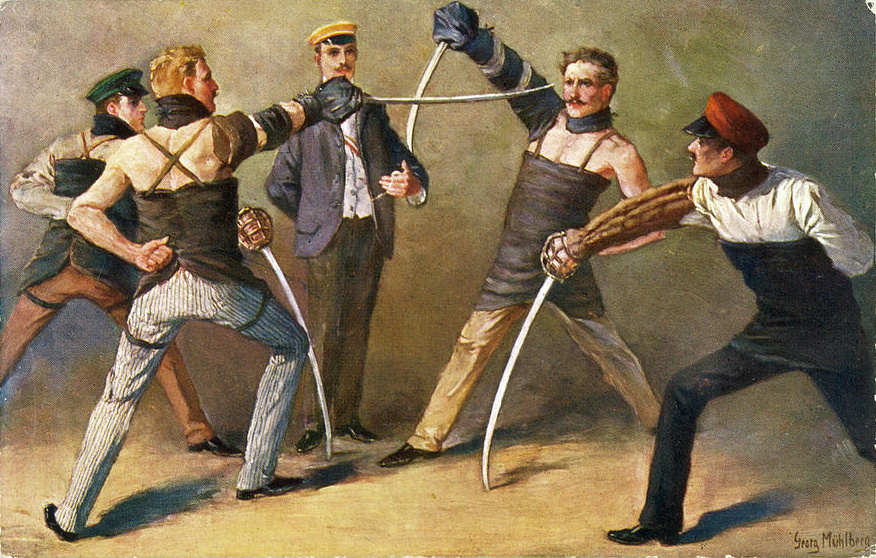
Academic fencing, c. 1900

Greifswald has several different student fraternities and sororities, which are called Studentenverbindungen (the singular is Studentenverbindung). Studentenverbindungen have a long tradition as most of them were founded in the 19th century, and they are to some extent comparable to the fraternities in the United States. As traditional symbols (couleur) corporation members wear coloured caps and ribbons at ceremonial occasions (Kommers) and some still practice the traditional academic fencing, a kind of duel, in order to "shape their members for the challenges of life". In the 19th and early 20th century, corporations played an important role in Germany's student life. Today, however, corporations include only a relatively small number of students. Their self-declared mission is to keep academic traditions alive and to create friendships for life. The political views of the fraternities are more or less conservative, but two of them (Rugia and Markomannia) have been linked to the far-right NPD.

== Notable people ==
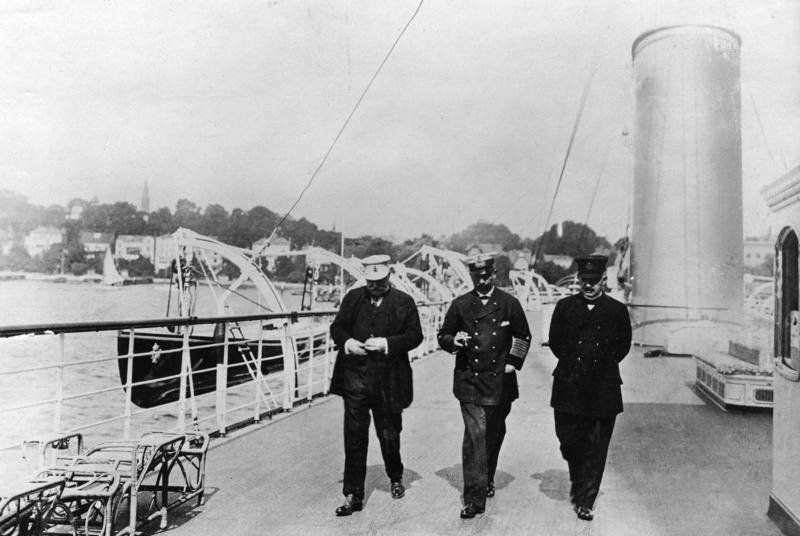
Prince Bernhard von Bülow—Chancellor of the German Empire from 1900 to 1909—Emperor Wilhelm II of Germany, and Rudolf von Valentini (left to right) on board SMY Hohenzollern in 1908

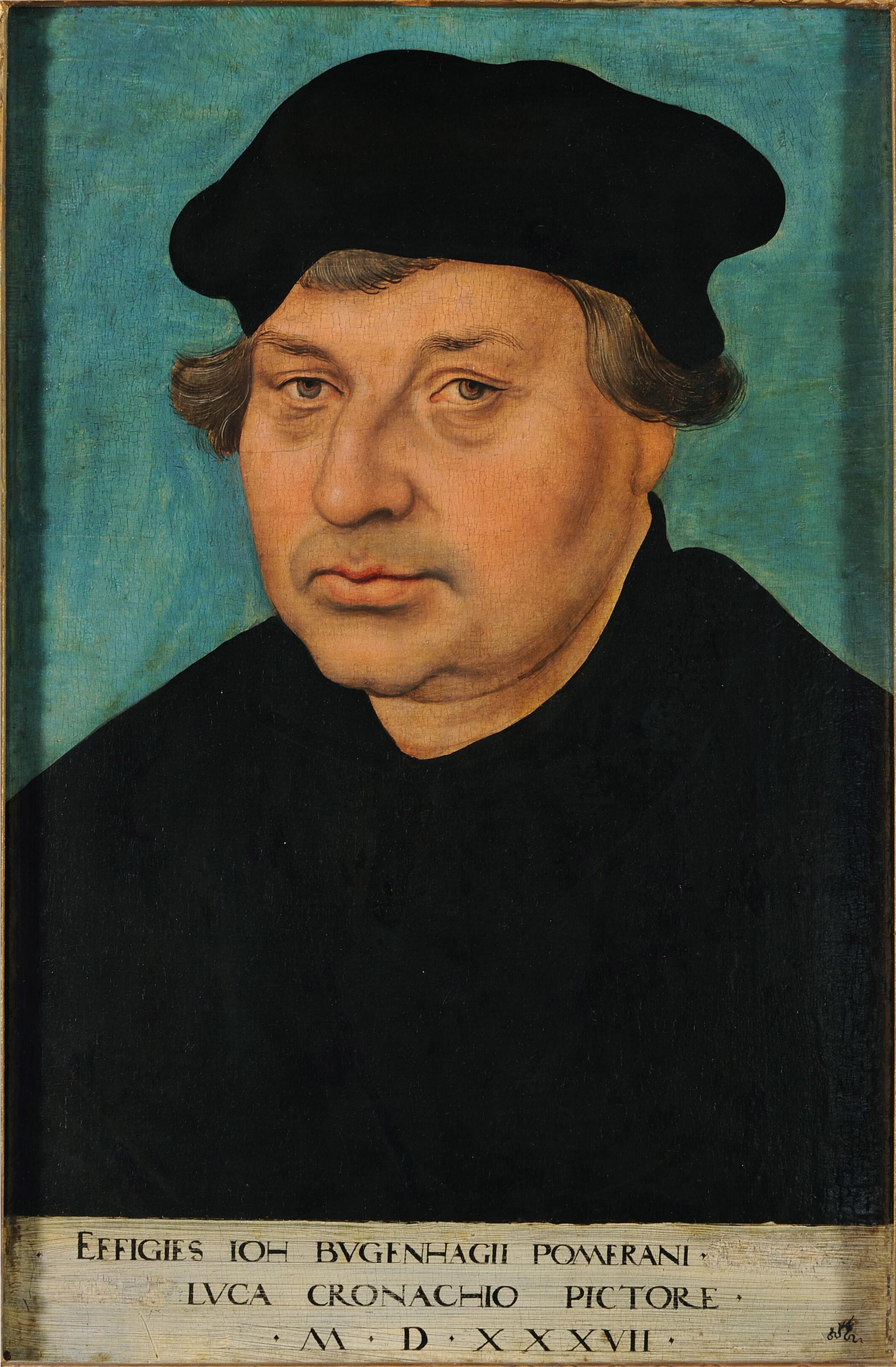
Johannes Bugenhagen (1485–1558) – religious reformer in North Germany, Denmark and Norway; friend of Martin Luther.

The University of Greifswald is associated with several notable people, including both former students and faculty. For instance, 17th-century lawyer David Mevius, two Nobel Prize laureates as well as two German chancellors have studied or worked in Greifswald.

Johannes Stark (1874–1957) received the Nobel Prize in Physics in 1919 (see Nobel Prize Website) "for his discovery of the Doppler effect in canal rays and the splitting of spectral lines in electric fields" during his time at the University of Greifswald. In 1939, Gerhard Domagk (1895–1964) received the Nobel Prize in Medicine (see Nobel Prize Website) "for the discovery of the antibacterial effects of prontosil". The university was named in honor of its former student and faculty member, the writer, politician, and poet Ernst Moritz Arndt. Otto von Bismarck, chancellor of the German Empire from 1871 to 1890 and the "engineer" of the Unification of Germany in 1871, had a connection to Greifswald when he studied at the agricultural college, as well as one of his successors, Prince Bernhard von Bülow, who was chancellor of the German Empire from 1900 to 1909.

Franz Seldte, a chemist by profession, worked as a German labour minister. Johannes Bugenhagen, who introduced the Reformation in much of Northern Germany and Scandinavia was a student at the University of Greifswald and Thomas Thorild, a Swedish poet spent parts of his life in Greifswald. Alfred Gomolka, Member of the European Parliament for the CDU, worked for the university as well as the mathematician Felix Hausdorff. Bernhard Windscheid is one of the fathers of present German civil law. Ferdinand Sauerbruch, Theodor Billroth, Johann Friedrich Dieffenbach and Friedrich Loeffler made important contributions to the field of medical science. Hermann Löns became famous as a poet just like the discovers of Africa explorer Gustav Nachtigal became known around the world. Carl Schmitt, one of the most influential figures of 20th century political science was a member of staff. Mie scattering is named for Gustav Mie, a former professor of physics. Georg Friedrich Schömann, Ulrich von Wilamowitz-Moellendorff were noted classical philologists. Ernst W. Mayr, one of the 20th century's most influential evolutional biologists, studied at the University of Greifswald.

Several public figures received honorary doctorates from the University of Greifswald, including Jacques Delors (former president of the European Commission) and Hannelore Kohl (wife of former German chancellor Helmut Kohl).

The University of Greifswald and her research partners have also been visited by a number of heads of states, including then-chancellor of Germany Gerhard Schröder (2000, 2001), chancellor Angela Merkel (2010 and 2013), presidents of Germany Roman Herzog (1997), Horst Köhler (2006), Joachim Gauck (2013), and Queen Silvia of Sweden (2006).

== Quotes ==
"The University of Greifswald is one of those frequently mentioned 'flagships of science' in our country."

– The President of Germany, Horst Köhler, at the 550th anniversary celebrations in 2006

- If I look at the development of some of the universities [in the former eastern part] – for instance Greifswald, Dresden, and Jena – then we have achieved quite a lot. (German: Wenn ich mir die Entwicklung einiger Universitäten anschaue – etwa Greifswald, Dresden und Jena – dann sind wir da schon ein ganzes Stück weiter.)
  – Bundespräsident Johannes Rau on the development and education in the former GDR, 2004
- Strong and self-confident universities are fountains of fortitude for a whole region, a whole country even, just as everyone can see it happen here in Greifswald. (German: Starke, selbstbewusste Hochschulen sind Kraftquellen für eine ganze Region, ein ganzes Land. Hier in Greifswald lässt sich das sehr genau studieren.)
  – Bundespräsident Horst Köhler in 2006

== See also ==
- List of medieval universities
- List of universities in Germany
- List of oldest universities in continuous operation
- Medieval university
- Greifswald objectivism
