= Greifswald Medical School =

German medical research unit

- Medizinische Fakultät der Universität Greifswald
- Type: Faculty (medical school)
- Established: 1456
- Affiliations: University of Greifswald
- Location: Greifswald, Mecklenburg-Vorpommern, Germany; 54°5′18.00″N 13°24′19.00″E
- Website: www.medizin.uni-greifswald.de

Greifswald Medical School (German: Medizinische Fakultät der Universität Greifswald) is a division of the University of Greifswald, Germany, consisting of the university's medical school and the adjacent Greifswald University Hospital. Its roots date back to the founding of the university in the year 1456, and it is therefore one of the oldest such institutions in Europe.

== Institution ==
The medical school has existed since the founding of the university in 1456, and is therewith one of the oldest medical schools in the world still in existence.

== Admission ==
The University of Greifswald's medical school is the second most requested, the most selective, and among the best-ranked in Germany. In 2007, Greifswald was ranked 2nd of 34 medical schools in Germany in terms of popularity with prospective students, out-ranking other popular universities such as the University of Heidelberg. Degrees are offered in medicine as well as dentistry. In Germany, places to study medicine and dentistry are usually allocated (by high school results) on a national level by a country-wide agency. However, a certain fraction of the places available may be administered by the universities if they wish so. In the year 2023, there were 18,733 applications for 196 places for medicine in Greifswald, which equals an admission rate of only 1.05 percent. In the same year, there were 5979 applicants for 45 places in dentistry, which equals an admission rate of 0.75 percent.

== Programmes ==
- Medicine
- Dentistry
- Biomedical Science (B. Sc.)
- Clinical Nursing Science (B. Sc.)

== Greifswald University Hospital ==
The university hospital (German: Universitätsmedizin Greifswald), was completely reconstructed at the new science campus east of the city centre up to the year 2011. It is therefore one of the best equipped and most up-to-date full service hospital in Germany. The university hospital recently purchased a nearby communal hospital in the city of Wolgast to increase the number of beds and treated patients. This was the first time in Germany, that a (public) university hospital bought another public hospital. The merger was first prohibited because German antitrust authorities were worried about a dominating position of the Universitätsklinikum Greifswald in the region. However, the decision was later revoked by a direct veto of the federal government of Germany, which is a very rare procedure.

== Notable people ==
- Ferdinand Sauerbruch
