= Nordisches Institut =

The Nordisches Institut (Scandinavian and Finno-Ugric studies) was an institute founded in 1917 by Greifswald University in Germany for the study of Nordic culture and relations between German and Nordic Studies.
