= Greifswald University Library =

- Universitätsbibliothek Greifswald
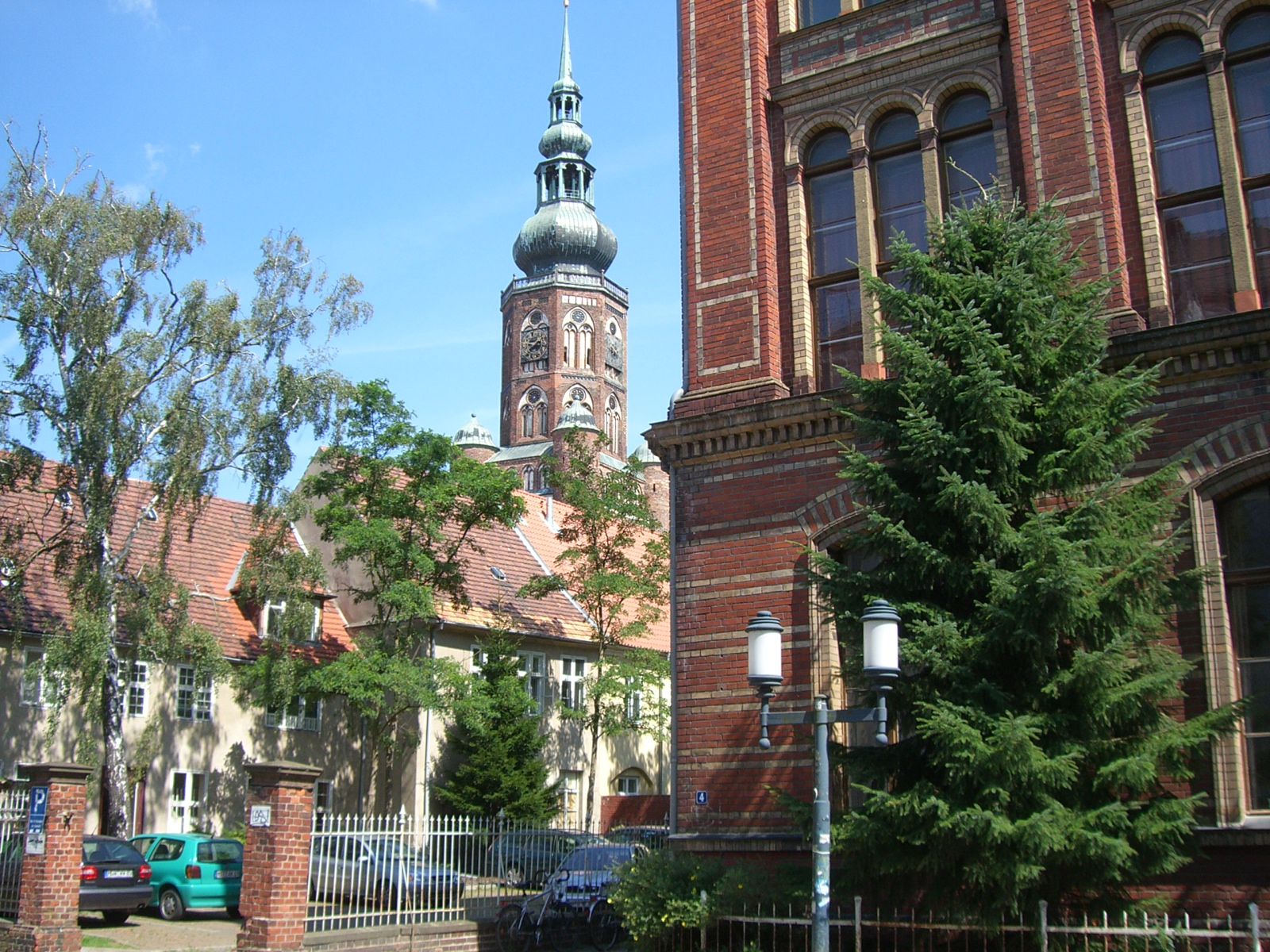
- The Alte Bibliothek (right) and the cathedral
- 54°05′27″N 13°24′23″E
- Location: Greifswald, Germany
- Type: university library
- Scope: University of Greifswald
- Established: 1456 and 1604
- Branches: 3

Collection
- Legal deposit: no

Other information
- Website: www.ub.uni-greifswald.de

Greifswald University Library (German: Universitätsbibliothek Greifswald) is the official library of the University of Greifswald, situated in Greifswald, Germany. Its earliest days go back to the founding of the university in the year 1456, and it became Germany's first centralised university library in the year 1604.

Today, it has three branches, namely the Alte Bibliothek (Old Library) in the city centre, and two other library buildings across town. The central university library is completed by various specialised libraries of the university's departments.

== History ==
The old library building was designed by Martin Gropius (1824–1880) and is located near the cathedral, the university main building, and the lecture hall.

A new site was completed in 2001 for the natural sciences and medicine library. The new library features 498 open places with internet access as well as 24 single rooms and four group rooms which are available for cost-free rent. The area within the building amounts to 13,890 square meters.

As part of a DFG-funded programme, the university library collects all books about all aspects of the Baltic States for all German libraries.

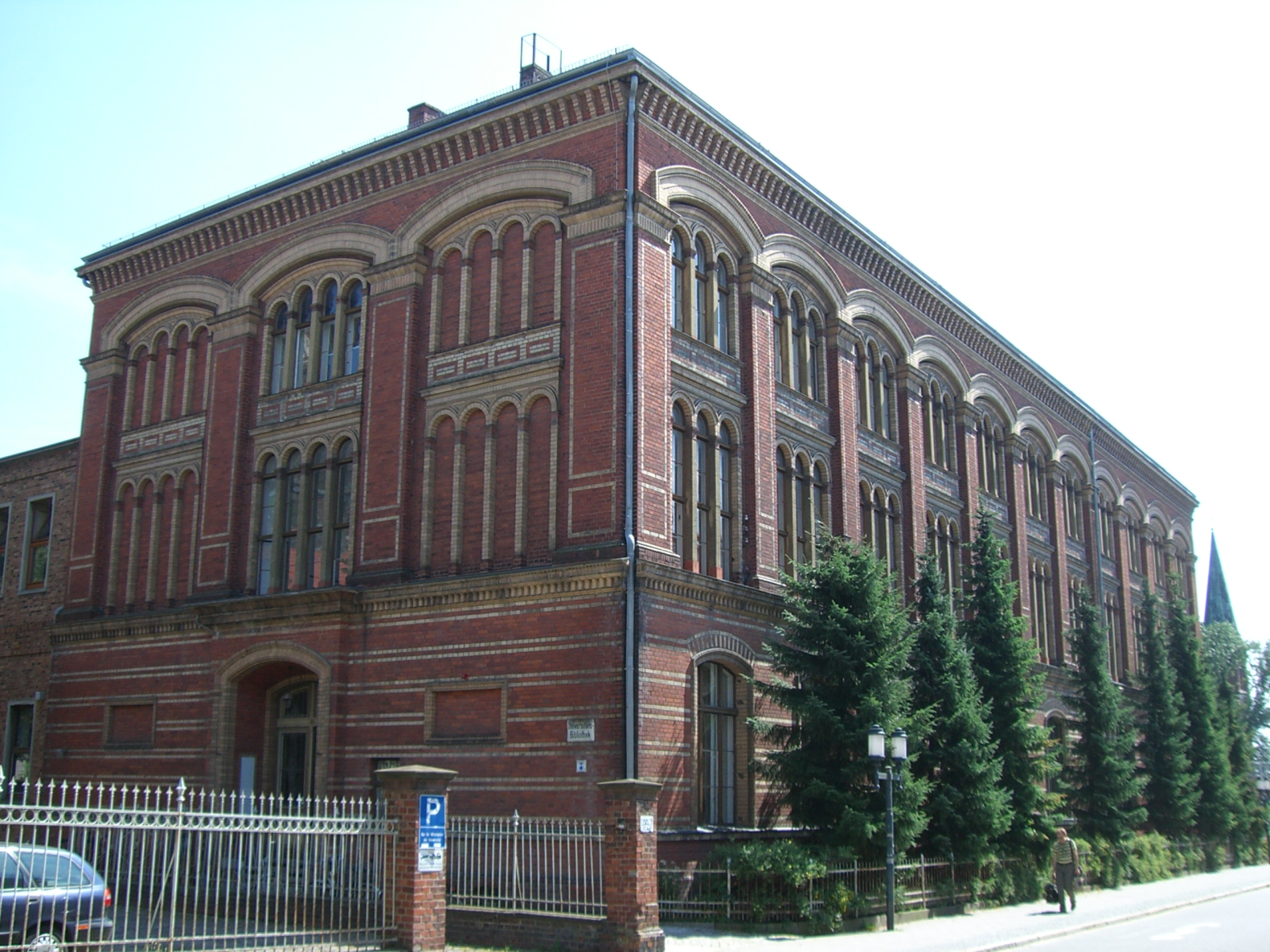
Alte Bibliothek

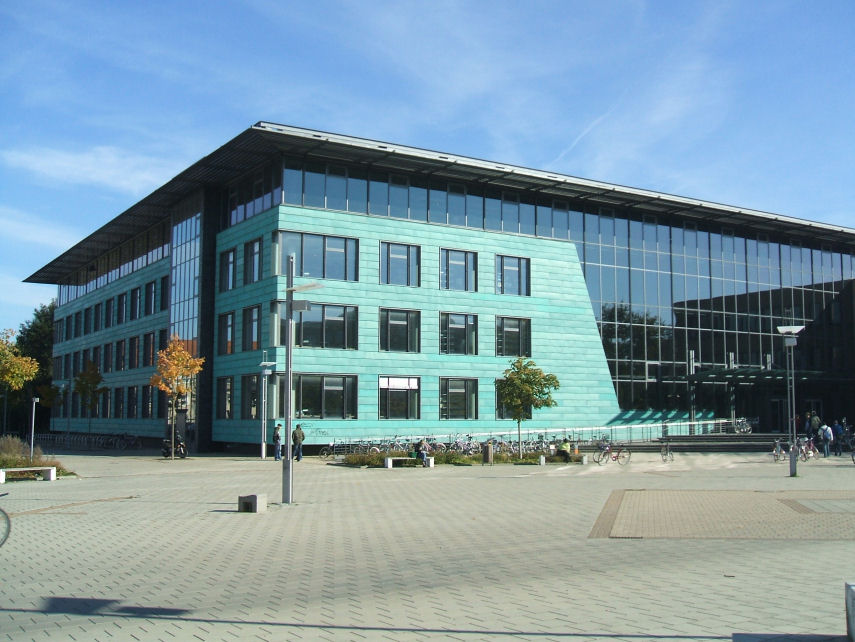
New Library
