= Greifswald University Hospital =

Geography
- Location: Greifswald, Germany
- Coordinates: 54°5′18″N 13°24′19″E

Organisation
- Care system: Public
- Type: teaching hospital
- Affiliated university: University of Greifswald

Services
- Beds: 850

History
- Opened: 1456

Links
- Website: http://www.medizin.uni-greifswald.de/

Greifswald University Hospital (German: Universitätsmedizin Greifswald) in Greifswald, Germany is a teaching hospital for the University of Greifswald's medical school. Greifswald University Hospital is owned and operated by a non-profit Anstalt des öffentlichen Rechts in cooperation with the university and serves as one of the primary hospitals in the state of Mecklenburg-Vorpommern. It also fills the function of a tertiary referral hospital for the health care region.

== History ==
The history of the medical school and the hospital in Greifswald date back to the founding of the University of Greifswald in the year 1456. An open clinic was established in 1794 with the help of the city council, where patients were treated for free with under the condition that students were present while the patient was being treated.

In the 19th century, many new buildings and facilities were built.

An entirely new hospital complex was built from 2001 to 2010 at a central campus location, thus replacing the former buildings that were scattered across the city.

== Facilities ==
Apart from Heart transplants, the hospital is a full-service hospital.

=== List of Clinical Departments ===
Currently, the University Hospital consists of the following clinical departments.

- Clinic for general and visceral surgery, thoracic and vascular surgery
- Clinic for Anesthesiology
- Clinic for Ophthalmology
- Clinic for Obstetrics and gynecology
- Clinic for Otorhinolaryngology and Head/Neck-Surgery
- Clinic for Dermatology
- Clinic for Internal Medicine A (Gastroenterology, Nephrology, Rheumatology, Endocrinology, Nutritional Medicine and Emergency Medicine)
- Clinic for Internal Medicine B (Pneumology, Cardiology, Angiology, Internal Intensive Medicine)
- Clinic for Internal Medicine C (Hematology, Oncology)
- Clinic for paediatric surgery
- Clinic for paediatrics
- Clinic for neurosurgery
- Clinic for Neurology
- Clinic for Nuclear medicine
- Clinic for Orthopaedics
- Clinic for Psychiatry and Psychotherapy
- Clinic for Radiology
- Clinic for Radiation therapy
- Clinic for Urology
- Centre of Orthopaedics, trauma surgery and rehabilitative medicine
- Centre of Dentistry

=== List of Institutes and Research Centres ===
Complementing the clinics there are a number of institutes.

- Institute for Anatomy and Cell biology
- Institute for Bioinformatics
- Institute for Community Medicine
  - Dept. of Methods in community medicine
  - Dept. of epidemiology in care and Community Health
  - Dept. for the Study of Health in Pomerania (SHIP) and clinical epidemiology
  - Dept. of general practice
- Institute for Ethics and Medical History
- Institute for Genetics and functional Genomics
  - Dept. of functional Genomics
  - Dept. of human genetics
- Institute for Hygiene and environmental medicine
- Institute for Immunology
- Institute for Transfusion Medicine
- Institute for clinical chemistry and laboratory medicine
- Institute for medical biochemistry and molecular biology
- Friedrich Loeffler-Institute of Medical Microbiology
- Institute for medical psychology
- Institute for Pathology
- Institute for Pathophysiology
- Institute for Pharmacology
- Institute for Physiology
- Institute for forensic medicine
- Institute for social medicine and prevention

== Notable people ==
- Theodor Billroth, surgeon
- Heinrich Adolf von Bardeleben
- Friedrich Loeffler, bacteriologist (namesake of the Friedrich Loeffler Institute)
- Gustav Nachtigal, explorer of Africa
- Ludwik Rydygier, surgeon
- Ferdinand Sauerbruch, surgeon
- Carl Ludwig Schleich, surgeon and writer
