= Aarne =

Estonian-Finnish male given name

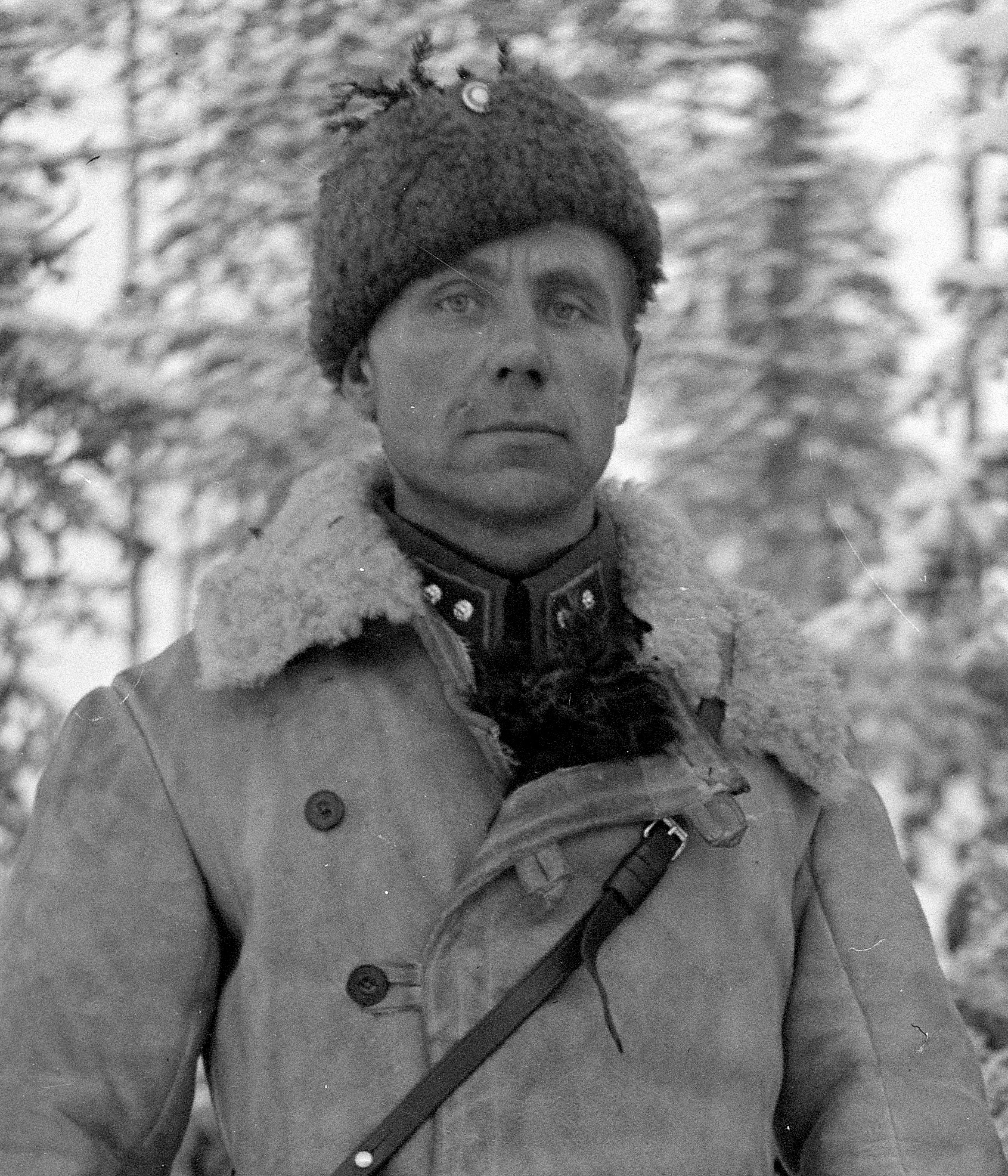
- Aarne Juutilainen, a Finnish army captain during the Winter War
- Pronunciation: Finnish: [ˈɑːrne]
- Gender: Male
- Languages: Finnish, Estonian
- Name day: 16 November

Origin
- Region of origin: Finland, Estonia

Other names
- Related names: Arnold, Arno, Arne

Aarne may be a masculine given name and a surname. It is a Finnish and Estonian form of the given name Arne, a form of "Arnold". Notable people with the name include:

== Surname ==
- Antti Aarne (1867–1925), Finnish folklorist
- Els Aarne (1917–1995), Estonian composer
- Johan Victor Aarne (1863–1934), Finnish metalsmith

== Given name ==
- Aarne Ahi (born 1943), Estonian animator and animated film director
- Aarne Arvonen (1897–2009), Finnish supercentenarian
- Aarne Blick (1894–1964), Finnish lieutenant general
- Aarne Castrén (1923–1997), Finnish sailor
- Aarne Ermus (born 1966), Estonian Defense Force colonel
- Aarne Ervi (1910–1977), Finnish architect
- Aarne Haapakoski (1904–1961), Finnish pulp writer
- Aarne Heikinheimo (1894–1938), Finnish major general
- Aarne Hermlin (1940–2007), Estonian chess player
- Aarne Honkavaara (1924–2016), Finnish ice hockey player and coach
- Aarne Hytönen (1901–1972), Finnish architect
- Aarne Juutilainen (1904–1976), Finnish army captain
- Aarne Kainlauri (1915–2020), Finnish former steeplechaser
- Aarne Kallberg (1891–1945), Finnish long-distance runner
- Aarne Kalliala (born 1950), Finnish actor
- Aarne Kauhanen (1909–1949), Finnish officer
- Aarne Kauppinen (1889–1927), Finnish artisan, smallholder, and politician
- Aarne Kreuzinger-Janik (born 1950), German Bundeswehr lieutenant general
- Aarne Lakomaa (1914–2001), Finnish aircraft designer
- Aarne Lindholm (1889–1972), Finnish long-distance runner
- Aarne Lindroos (born 1960), Finnish rower
- Aarne Ilmari Niemelä (1907–1975), Finnish chess player
- Aarne Nirk (born 1987), Estonian hurdler
- Aarne Nuorvala (1912–2013), Finnish official
- Aarne Orjatsalo (1883–1941), Finnish actor, theater manager, writer, revolutionary and soldier
- Aarne Pelkonen (1891–1949), Finnish gymnast, competed in the 1912 Summer Olympics
- Aarne Penttinen (1918–1981), Finnish politician
- Aarne Peussa (1900–1941), Finnish middle-distance runner
- Aarne Pohjonen (1886–1938), Finnish gymnast, competed in the 1908 Summer Olympics
- Aarne Pulkkinen (1915–1977), Finnish smallholder and politician
- Aarne Rannamäe (1958–2016), Estonian journalist
- Aarne Reini (1906–1974), Finnish wrestler and Olympic medalist in Greco-Roman wrestling
- Aarne Roine (1893–1938), Finnish gymnast
- Aarne Ruben (born 1971), Estonian writer
- Aarne Saarinen (1913–2004), Finnish politician and trade union leader
- Aarne Salovaara (1887–1945), Finnish gymnast and track and field athlete
- Aarne Saluveer (born 1959), Estonian conductor and music pedagogue
- Aarne Sihvo (1889–1963), Finnish general
- Aarne Soro (born 1974), Estonian actor
- Aarne Michaël Tallgren (1885–1945), Finnish archaeologist
- Aarne Tarkas (1923–1976), Finnish film director, screenwriter, producer and actor
- Aarne Üksküla (1937–2017), Estonian actor
- Aarne Valkama (1909–1969), Finnish Nordic combined skier
- Aarne Veedla (born 1963), Estonian historian and politician
- Aarne Vehkonen (1927–2011), Finnish weightlifter
- Aarne Viisimaa (1898–1989), Estonian operatic tenor and opera director
- Aarne Wuorimaa (1892–1975), Finnish diplomat

== Stage name ==
- Aarne (producer) (born 2001), London-based Romanian-born music producer

== See also ==
- Aarne–Thompson classification system, to help folklorists identify recurring plot patterns in the narrative structures of traditional folktales
- Arn (disambiguation)
- Aarni (given name)
- Aarno
