= Pulkkinen =

Pulkkinen is a Finnish surname, derived from the Germanic word Volk, meaning "people". Notable people with the surname include:

- Aarne Pulkkinen (1915–1977), Finnish politician
- Albin Pulkkinen (1875–1944), Finnish politician
- Ari Pulkkinen (born 1982), Finnish musician
- David Pulkkinen (born 1949), Canadian ice hockey player
- Kati Pulkkinen (born 1975), Finnish cross country skier
- Riikka Pulkkinen (born 1980), Finnish writer
- Salomo Pulkkinen (1873–1952), Finnish politician
- Teemu Pulkkinen (born 1992), Finnish ice hockey player
- Tomi Pulkkinen (born 1992), Finnish figure skater
- Toni Pulkkinen (born 1990), Finnish ice hockey player
- Yrjö Pulkkinen (1875–1945), Finnish politician
