= Aarno =

Aarno is a Finnish masculine given name. Notable people with the name include:

- Aarno Karhilo (1927–2008), Finnish diplomat.
- Aarno Maliniemi (1892–1972), Finnish professor.
- Aarno Pesonen (1886-1927), Finnish politician.
- Aarno Raninen (1944–2014), Finnish singer.
- Aarno Rinne (born 1941), Finnish football player.
- Aarno Ruusuvuori (1925–1992), Finnish architect.
- Aarno Sulkanen (born 1940), Finnish actor.
- Aarno Turpeinen (1971-2022), Finnish football player.
- Aarno Yrjö-Koskinen (1885–1951), Finnish politician.
- Erkki Aarno Mallenius (1928-2003), Finnish boxer.

== See also ==
- Aarne
- Aarni (given name)
- Arno (name)
