= 1961 in architecture =

The year 1961 in architecture involved some significant architectural events and new buildings.

== Events ==
- December - Demolition of the Euston Arch in London begins.
- Archigram is founded as an avant-garde architectural group based at the Architectural Association, London, and publishes its manifesto Archigram I. It will work through hypothetical projects and an associated magazine.
- Ahrends, Burton and Koralek is formed as an architectural practice in London.
- Building Design Partnership is formed in Preston, Lancashire.
- St Eusebius' Church, Arnhem, Netherlands, is restored by Berend Tobia Boeyinga.
- The first apartment blocks in Hungary of Panelház (large panel building) construction are erected in Dunaújváros.
- Construction of Jatiyo Sangsad Bhaban (house of the national parliament of Bangladesh) in Dhaka, designed by Louis Kahn, begins.
- Double tee beams are first used by Gene Leedy in constructing his own office at Winter Haven, Florida.

== Buildings and structures ==
=== Buildings opened ===
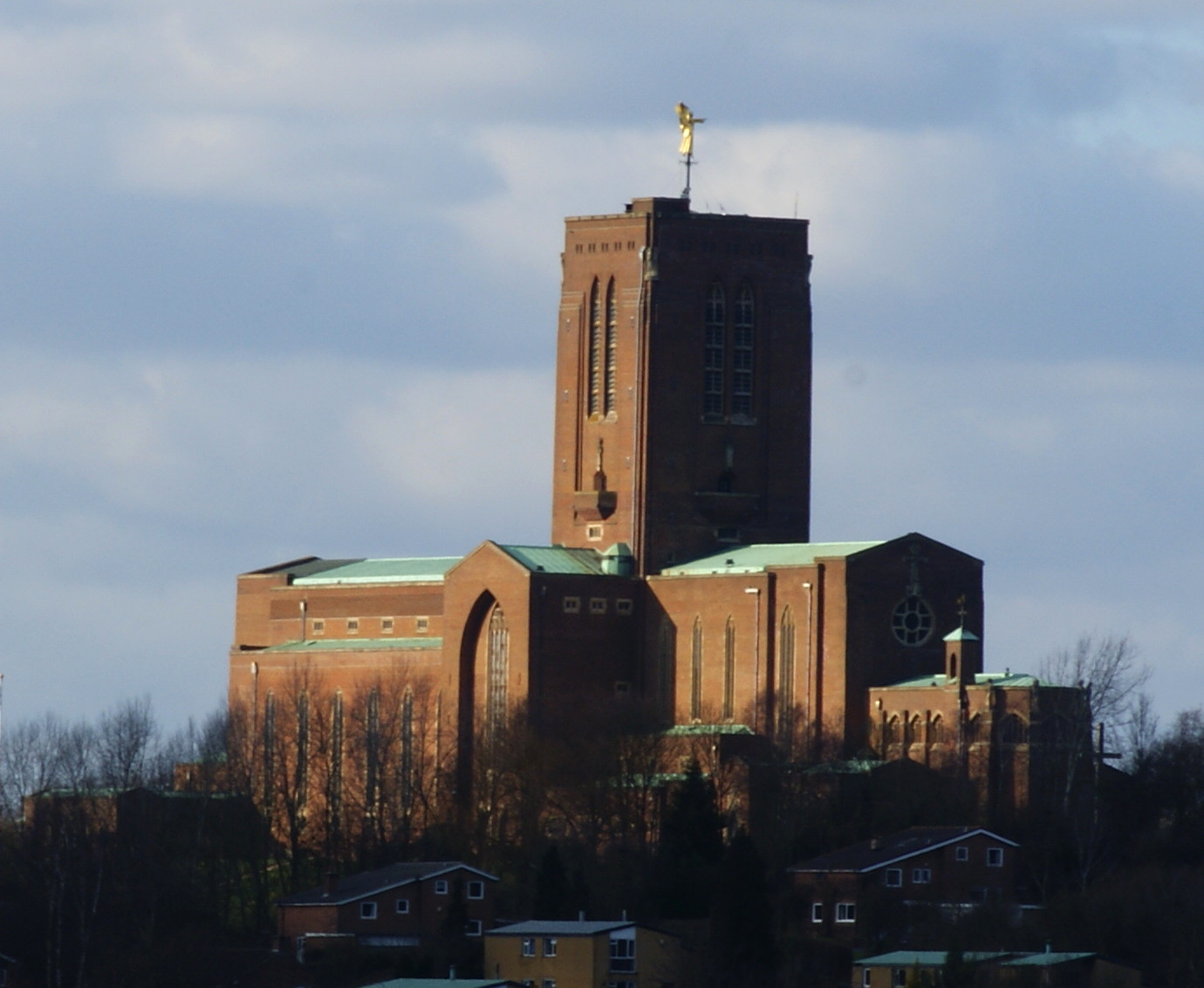
Guildford Cathedral, England

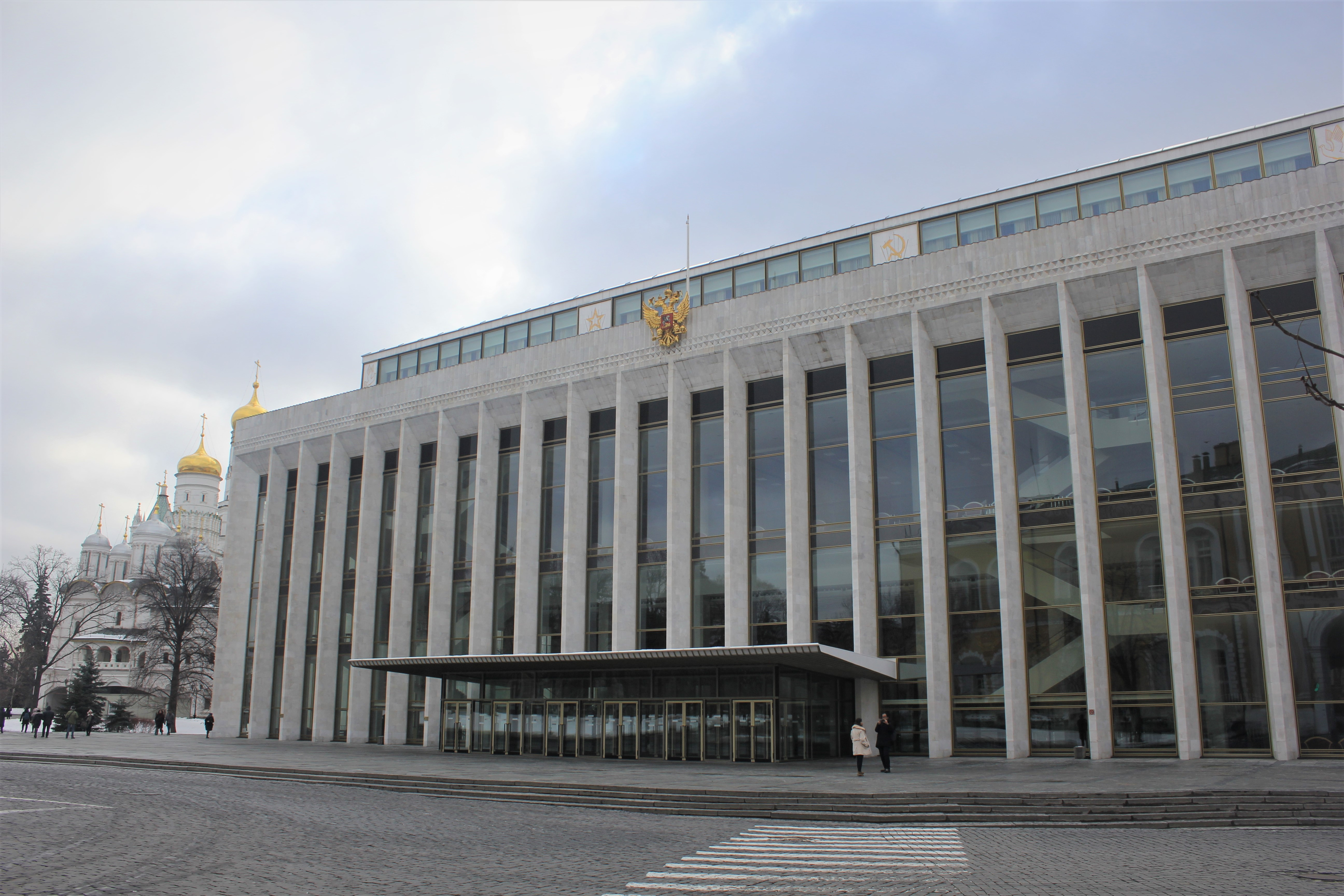
The Kremlin Palace of Congresses in Moscow, Russia

- February 6 - Olin Library at Cornell University, designed by Warner, Burns, Toan & Lunde, opens.
- March 11 - Benton Park School, Leeds, England, designed by Sir John Burnet, Tait and Partners, formally opened.
- May 17 - Guildford Cathedral, England, designed by Sir Edward Maufe, dedicated.
- May 18 - The Henninger Turm in Frankfurt, Germany, designed by Karl Leiser, inaugurated.
- September 17 - The Civic Arena, Pittsburgh, United States, designed by Mitchell and Ritchey, is completed (demolished 2011-2012).
- October 17 - The Kremlin Palace of Congresses in Moscow, Soviet Union, designed by a team led by M. Posokhin.
- November 20 - Dungeness Lighthouse on the south coast of England, designed by Philip W. Hunt (engineer) and Ronald Ward and Partners (architects), illuminated.
- December 17 - New Kaiser Wilhelm Memorial Church (Gedächtniskirche) in Berlin, designed by Egon Eiermann, consecrated.
- date unknown - Rose Art Museum in Waltham, Massachusetts, designed by Harrison & Abramovitz.

=== Buildings completed ===
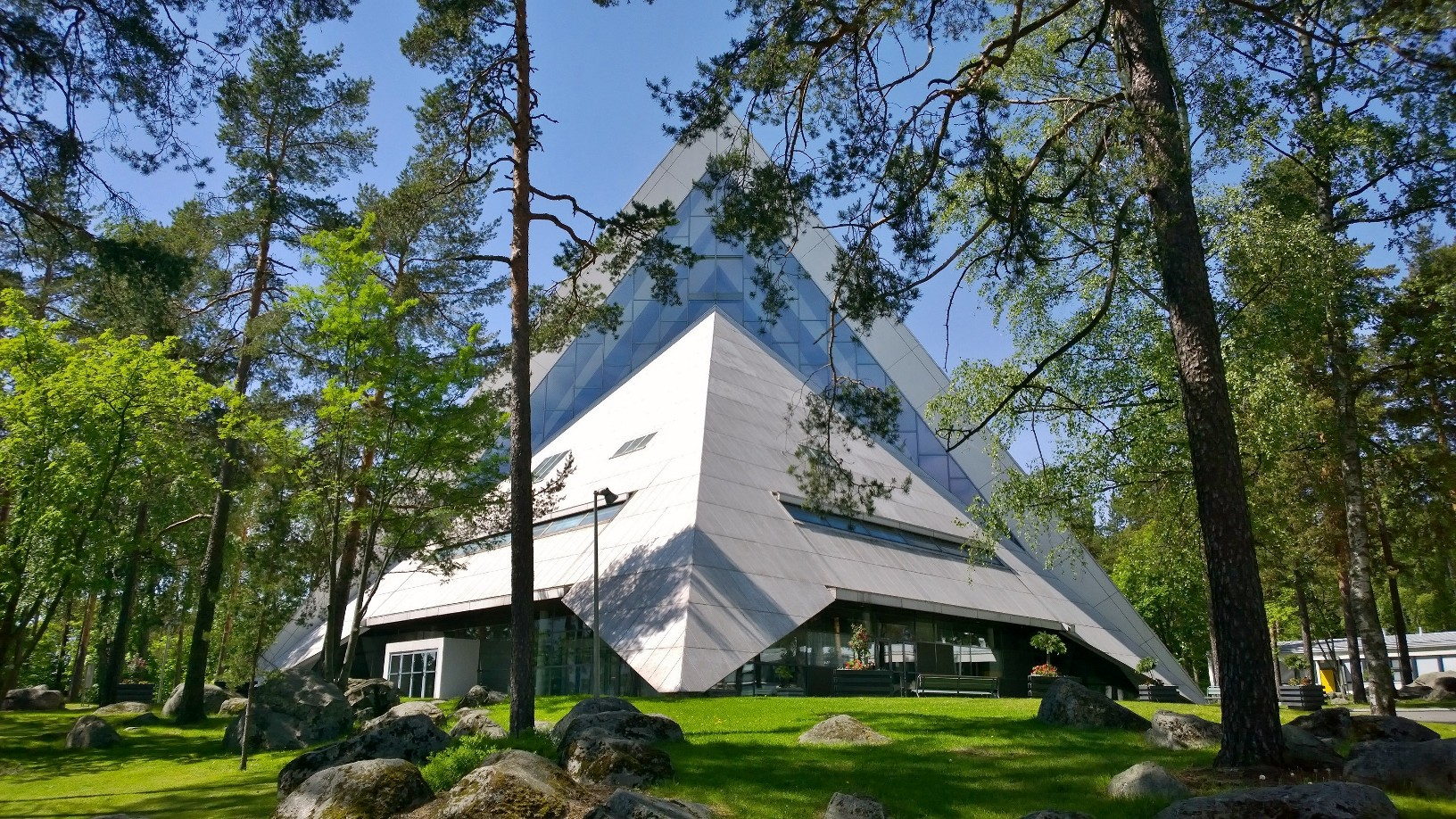
Hyvinkää Church, Finland

- December 8 - The Space Needle in Seattle, Washington, United States, designed by Edward Carlson, John Graham and Victor Steinbrueck.
- date unknown
  - Hyvinkää Church in Hyvinkää, Finland, designed by Aarno Ruusuvuori.
  - The Palazzo del Lavoro and Palazzetto dello sport in Turin, designed by Pier Luigi Nervi.
  - One Chase Manhattan Plaza in New York City, United States, designed by Gordon Bunshaft of Skidmore, Owings and Merrill.
  - The Empress State Building in London, England, designed by Stone, Toms & Partners.
  - Brasenose College, Oxford, England, Staircases 16, 17 and 18, designed by Powell and Moya.
  - Lady Margaret Hall, Oxford, England, Wolfson Quadrangle library and entrance, designed by Raymond Erith.
  - Yokohama Marine Tower in Yokohama, Japan.
  - Chungking Mansions in Hong Kong, China.
  - Park Hill Flats, Sheffield, England, designed by Jack Lynn and Ivor Smith.
  - Keelson (house for Olga Kennard), Hills Avenue, Cambridge, England, designed by Danish architect Eric Sørensen.
  - Embassy of the United States, Baghdad, Iraq, designed by Josep Lluís Sert, is completed (abandoned 1990).
  - Michael Faraday Memorial at Elephant and Castle in London, designed by Rodney Gordon.
  - Service station with hyperbolic paraboloid concrete shell roof at Markham Moor, Nottinghamshire, England, designed by Sam Scorer.

== Publications ==
- Jane Jacobs - The Death and Life of Great American Cities
- Lewis Mumford - The City in History
- Gordon Cullen - The Concise Townscape

== Awards ==
- AIA Gold Medal - Le Corbusier.
- RAIA Gold Medal - Louis Laybourne-Smith.
- RIBA Royal Gold Medal - Lewis Mumford.
- Rome Prize - Max Abramovitz

== Births ==
- July - Simon Allford, English architect
- November 18 - Dietmar Feichtinger, Austrian architect based in Paris
- Patrik Schumacher, German-born architect

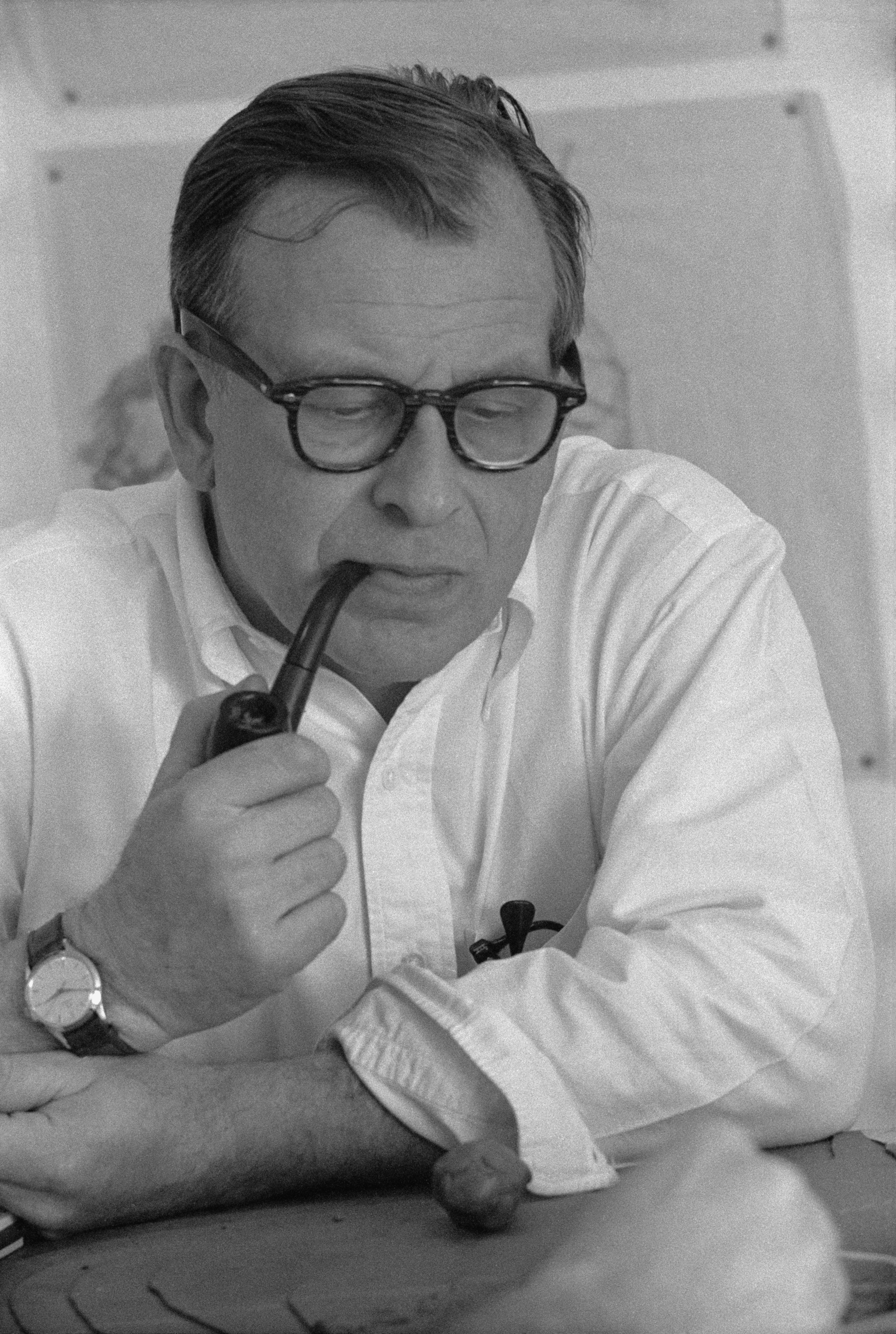
Eero Saarinen

== Deaths ==
- January 5 - Yehuda Magidovitch, Israeli architect (born 1886)
- July 18 - Olaf Andreas Gulbransson, German architect (born 1916)
- August 3 - Gilbert Stanley Underwood, American architect best known for his National Park lodges (born 1880)
- September 1 - Eero Saarinen, Finnish architect and industrial designer (born 1910)
- September 16 - Walter Godfrey, English architectural historian and architect (born 1881)
- October 19 - Jan Buijs, Dutch architect (born 1889)
- December 13 - Henry Hornbostel, American architect and educator (born 1867)
