= Aarni (disambiguation) =

Aarni is an avant-garde metal band from Finland.

Aarni may also refer to:

- Aarni (given name), a masculine given name
- Mikko Aarni (born 1981), Finnish bandy player

== See also ==
- Aarne, a surname
- Aarnie
- Arni (disambiguation)
