= Penttinen =

Penttinen is a Finnish surname. Notable people with the surname include:

- Aarne Penttinen (1918–1981), Finnish politician
- Petri Penttinen (born 1965), Finnish skier
- Rory Penttinen (born 1979), Finnish racing driver
