= Tapiola Church =

Church in Espoo, Finland

Coordinates: 60°10′39″N 024°48′32″E

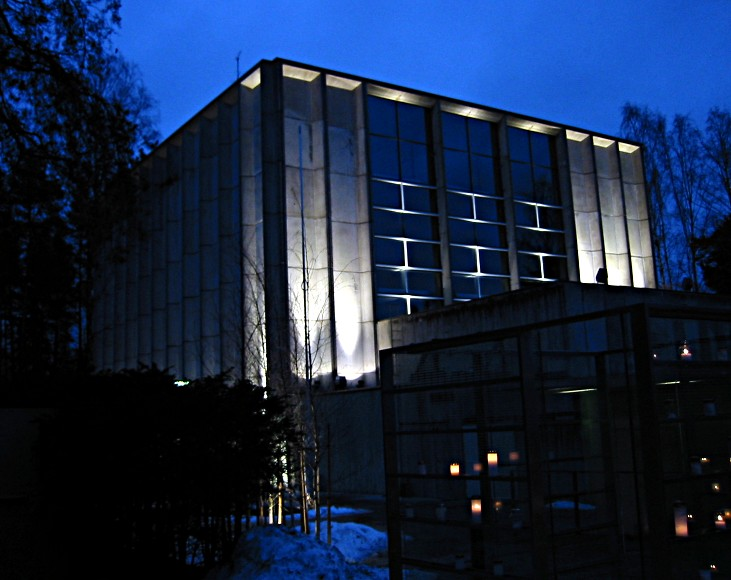
Tapiola Church in the winter

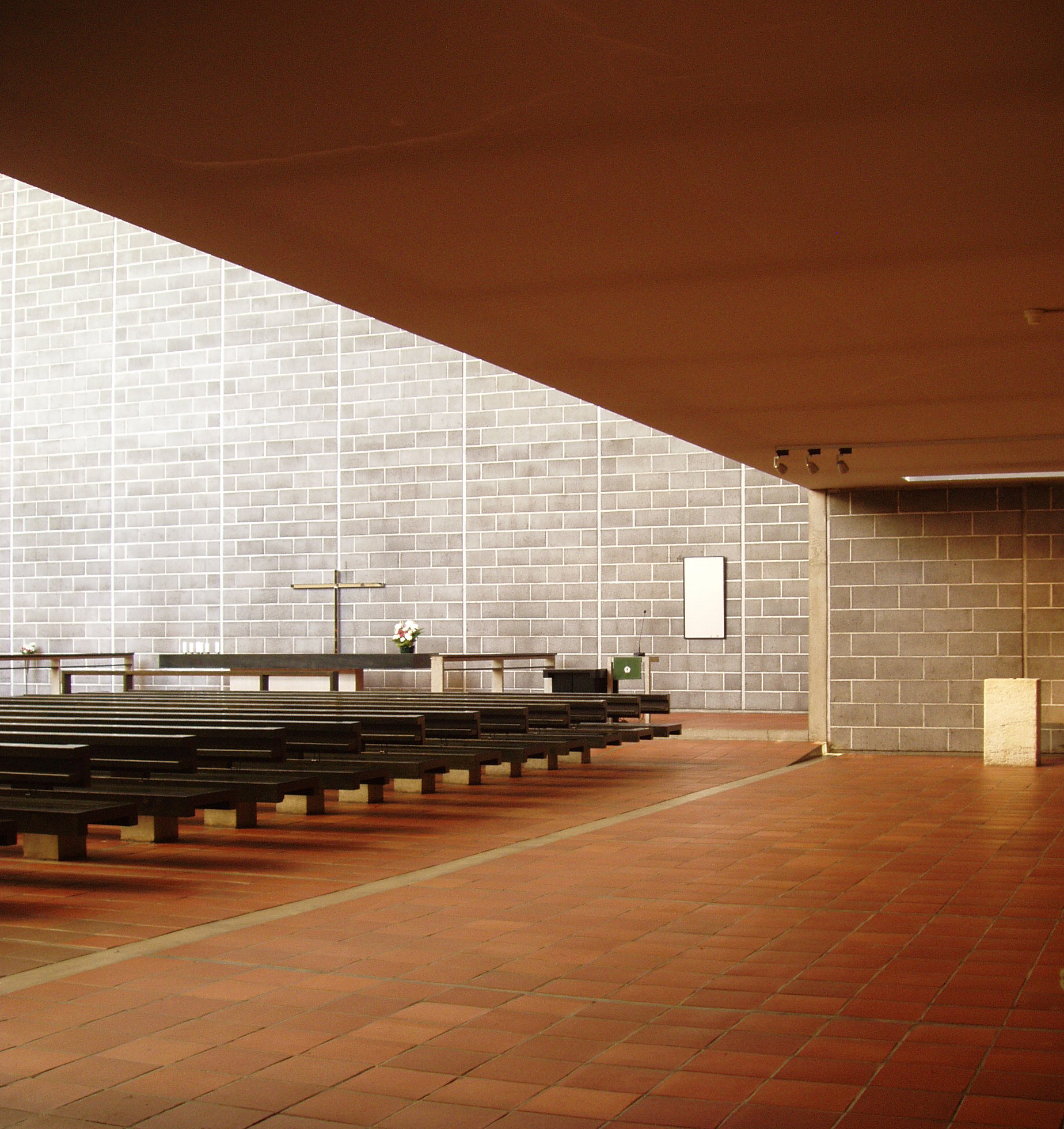
Church interior

Tapiola Church (Finnish: Tapiolan kirkko, Swedish: Hagalunds kyrka) is a Lutheran church in the Tapiola district of Espoo, Finland. The modernist concrete building in brutalist style was designed by the architect Aarno Ruusuvuori and opened in 1965. The church seats 600 people and is thus the largest in Espoo by capacity.

The church is part of the garden city of Tapiola which is internationally famous for its architecture and listed as a nationally significant built cultural heritage site by the National Board of Antiquities. Docomomo has also selected Tapiola as a significant example of modern architecture in Finland.

== See also ==
- Hyvinkää Church, another church by Aarno Ruusuvuori
