= Helsinki City Hall =

Administrative building of Helsinki, Finland

- Finnish: Helsingin kaupungintalo Swedish: Helsingfors stadshus
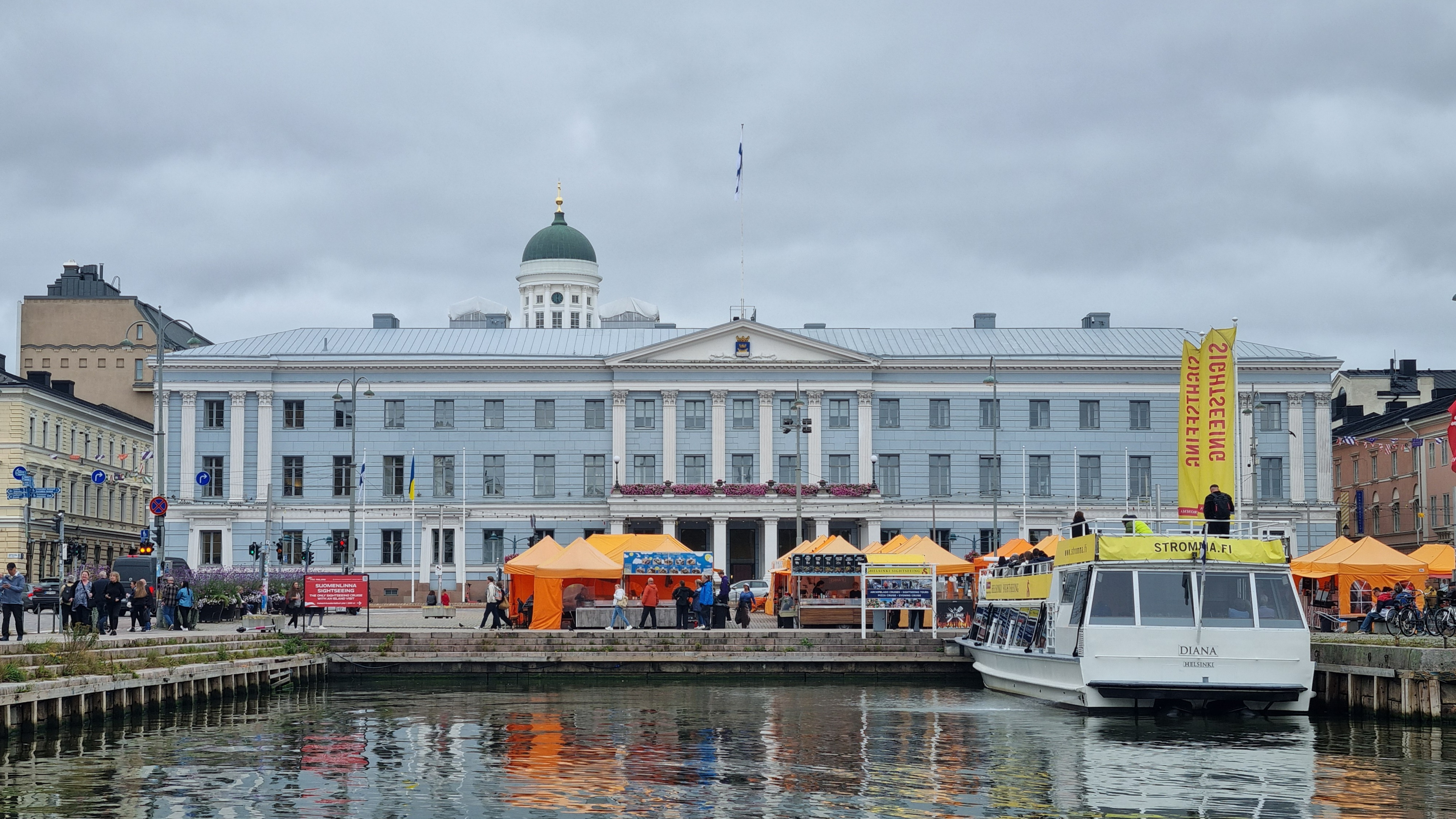
- Helsinki City Hall in September 2025
- Interactive map of the Helsinki City Hall area
- Former names: Hotel Seurahuone

General information
- Architectural style: Neoclassical
- Location: Helsinki, Finland
- Coordinates: 60.1681°N 24.9529°E
- Current tenants: City of Helsinki
- Completed: 1833
- Renovated: 1965–70; 1985–88; 1998–99

Design and construction
- Architects: Carl Ludvig Engel (original); Aarno Ruusuvuori (extension)

Helsinki City Hall (Finnish: Helsingin kaupungintalo, Swedish: Helsingfors stadshus) is a central administrative building of Helsinki, Finland. City Hall is located in the Kruununhaka district, overlooking Market Square, at address Pohjoisesplanadi 11–13. City Hall is the seat of the City Council of Helsinki.

== History ==
Completed in 1833, the building originally served as Hotel Seurahuone and was an important cultural facility hosting many premieres. The hotel was designed by Carl Ludvig Engel who also designed the major buildings around the nearby Senate Square. The city purchased the building in 1901 and, after the hotel moved out in 1913, renovated it as a city hall.

Following an architectural competition the City Hall was radically remodeled by architect Aarno Ruusuvuori in 1965–70, replacing many of the old classical interiors and building modern glass-facaded insertions.

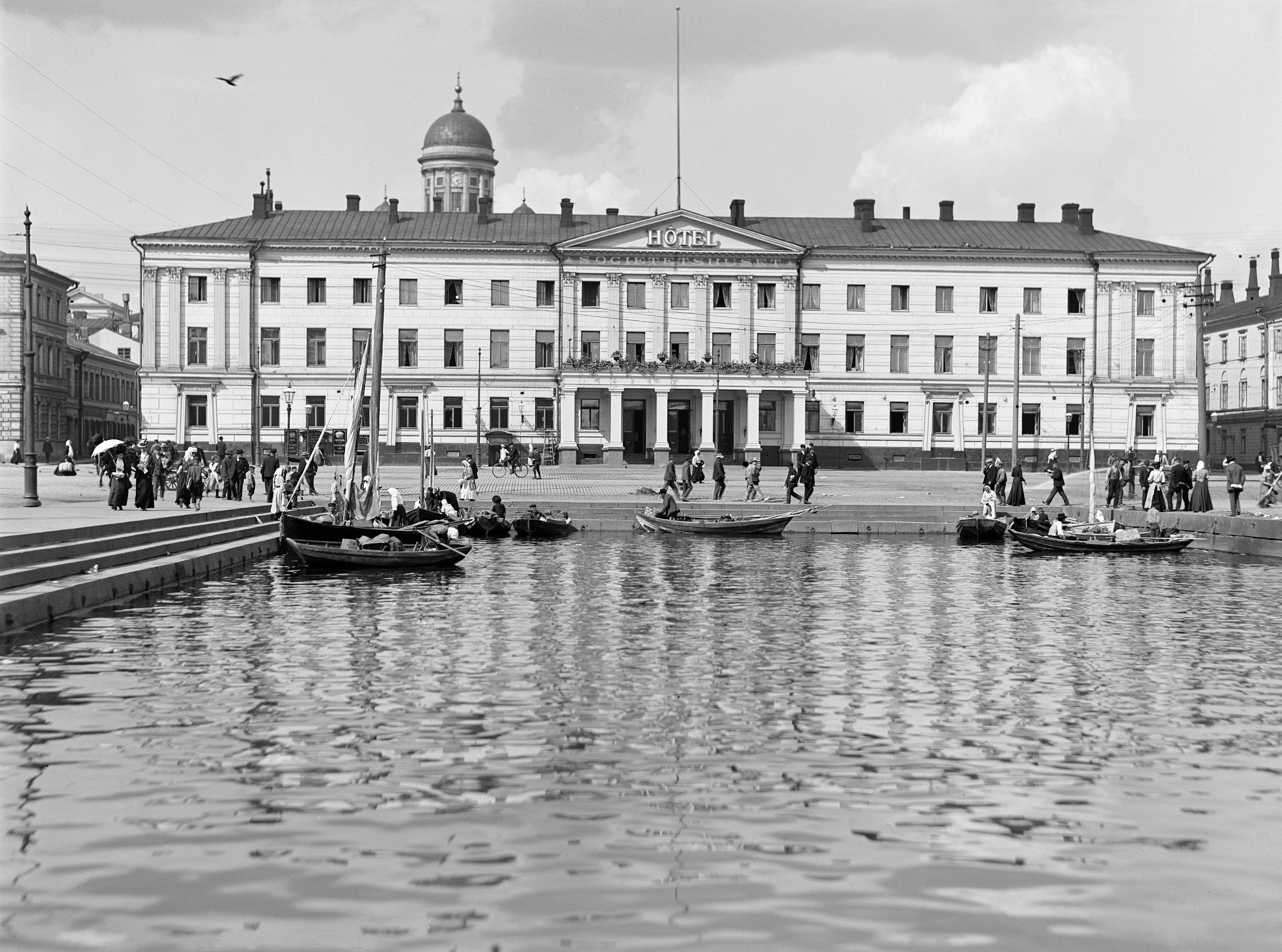
Hotel Seurahuone in 1908, seen from across the Market Square.

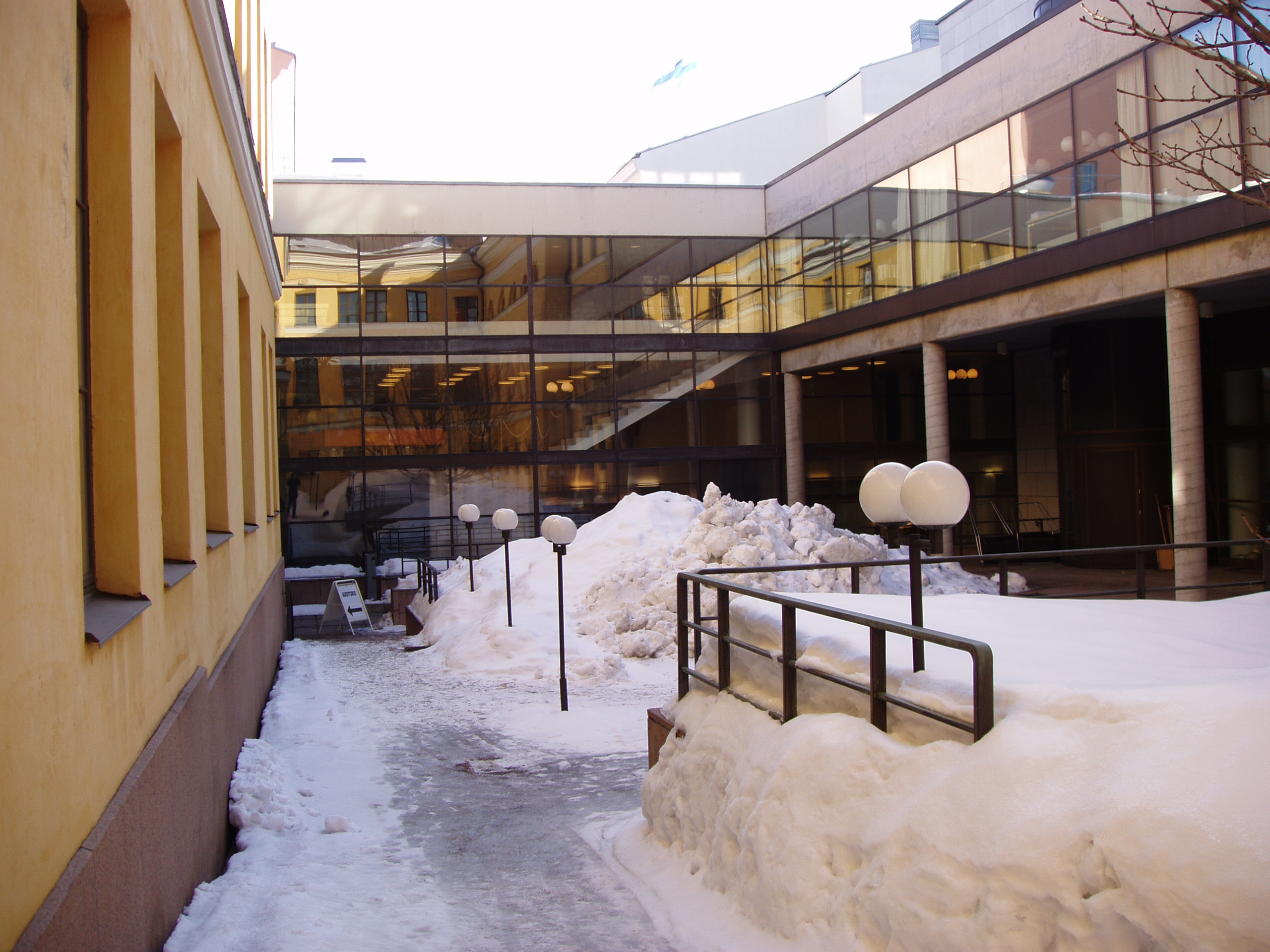
City Hall extension built in the 1980s, designed by Aarno Ruusuvuori.

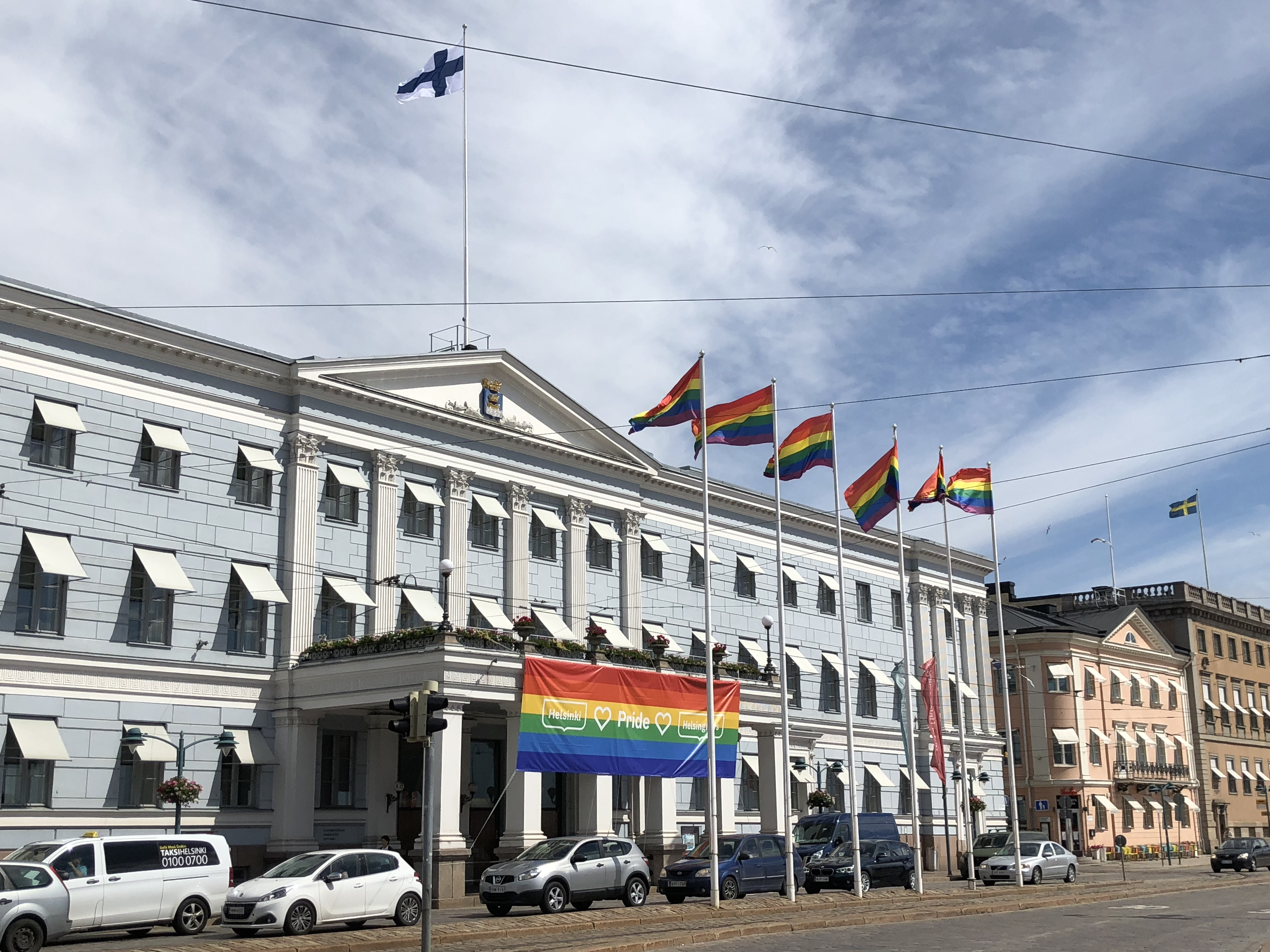
City Hall during Helsinki Pride in 2018.

== Functions ==
The City Hall hosts the offices of the Mayor of Helsinki and the Deputy Mayors as well as the meeting facilities for the City Council and City Board. The City Council meets on alternate Wednesdays in the Council Chamber.

City Hall hosts the Virka information service, which is open to all Helsinki residents. The Virka gallery hosts exhibitions, concerts, and movie screenings.

== See also ==
- Kuopio City Hall
- Oulu City Hall
- Seinäjoki City Hall
- Turku City Hall
