= Aarne Ruben =

Estonian writer (born 1971)

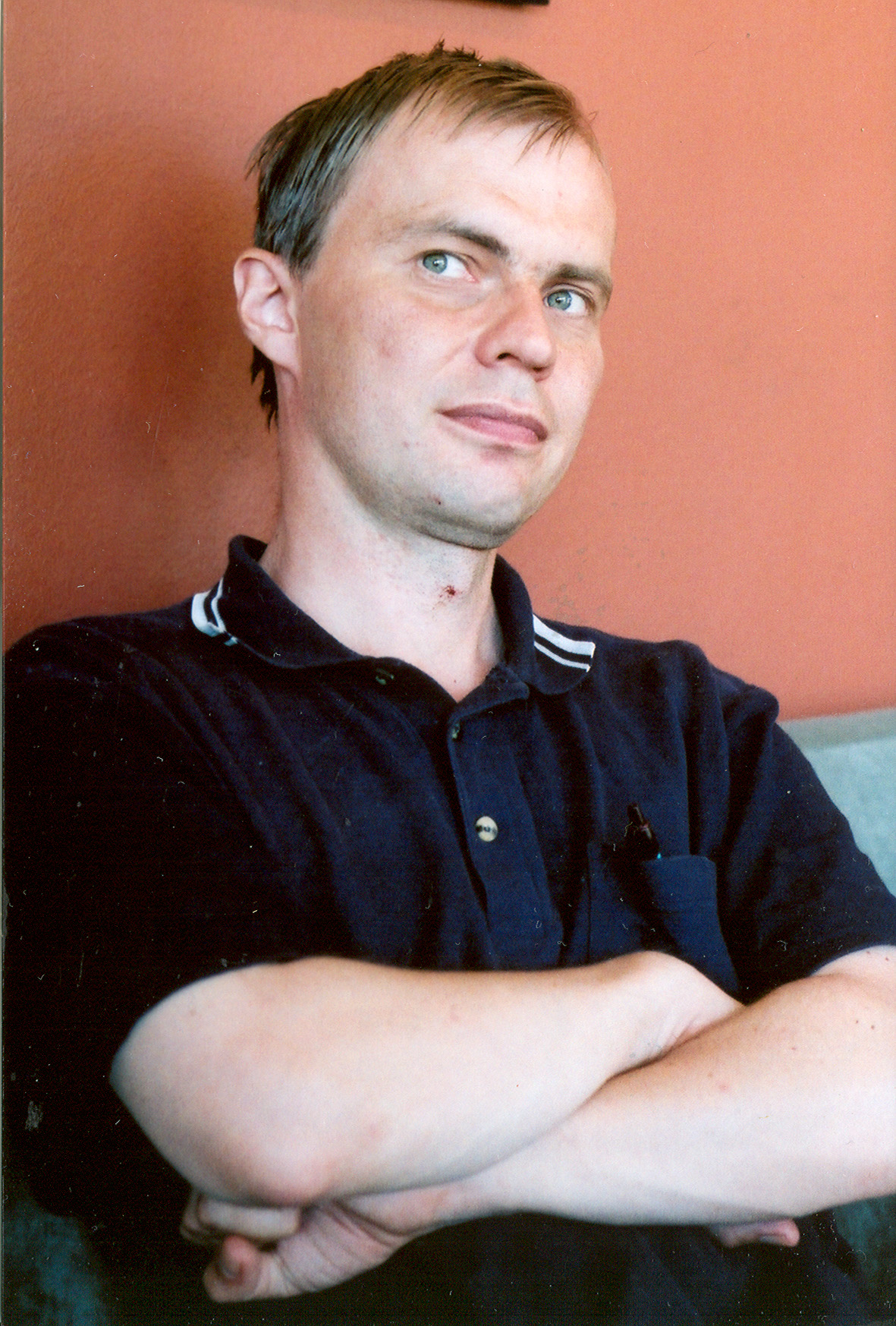
- Aarne Ruben (2009)
- Occupation: writer

Aarne Ruben (born 17 July 1971) is an Estonian writer.

Ruben was born in Tallinn.

He has written several novels, mainly based on Estonian history in the 20th century, his most known being The Volta Works Whistles Mournfully, (2001) ("Volta annab kaeblikku vilet"), about the Russian Revolution of 1905, Lenin and the dadaist movement in Zürich.

He was awarded the first prize of the novel competition 2000 organised by the Estonian Novel Foundation.

Ruben's second novel, "Beast on the Landing" ("Elajas trepi eelastmel", 2004), brings the reader into a medieval story. The main hero, Livonian knight Adolf von Wannevar, is the second son of a landlord of Transpalen (15th-century name of the Estonian borough Põltsamaa). Instead of inheriting his father's manor and property, he travels to the west and becomes a law student at the Charles University in Prague. He goes to the pilgrimage into the Council of Constance and becomes a witness to the condemning and burning of Jan Hus. He founds Hus's dissident fan-club and travels to Lübeck, where he gets a job as a lawyer in the Hanseatic merchant association and marries a 14-year-old Lübeck girl. In his later years, Adolf serves the University of Paris as a law scholar.

"Beast on the Landing" depicts the medieval possibility of moving in the spaces between different cultures.
