= Aarni (given name) =

Aarni is a masculine given name. Notable people with the name include:

- Aarni Neuvonen (20th century), Estonian criminal
- Markus Aarni Erämies Kajo (born 1957), Finnish reporter, screenwriter, and television host

== See also ==
- Aarne
- Aarno
