= Aarne Rannamäe =

Estonian journalist

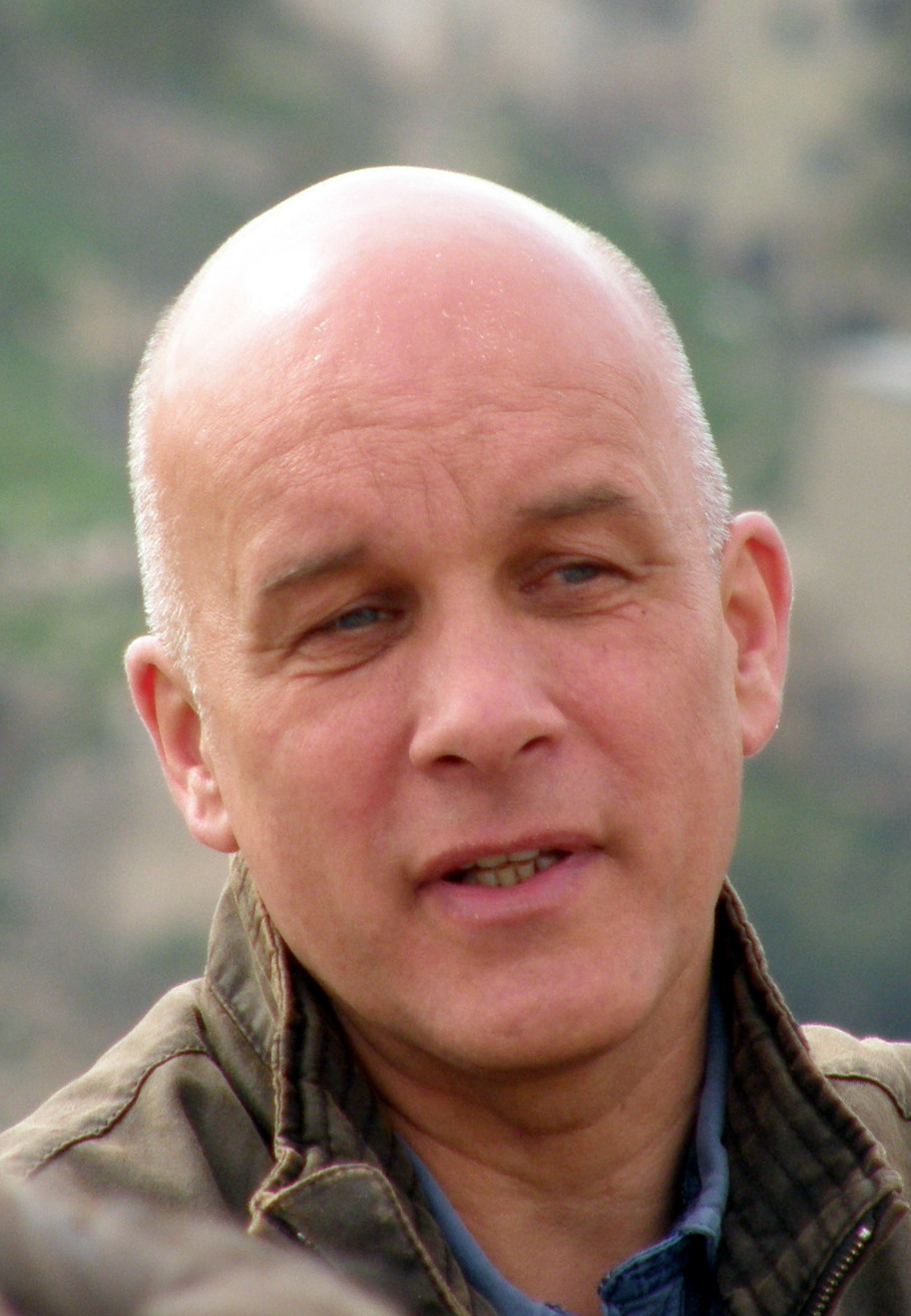
Aarne Rannamäe

Aarne Rannamäe (10 May 1958 Tartu – 10 September 2016) was an Estonian journalist. His primary field of interest was topics related to foreign policy.

In 1981, he graduated from University of Tartu in journalism.

After graduating the university, he started his work at Estonian Public Broadcasting. At Estonian Public Broadcasting, he was a presenter and editor. Amongst other things, he did international reporting for the news program "Aktuaalne kaamera".

Awards:

- 2007 Order of the White Star, V class.
- 2008 Valdo Pant award
