= Aarno Rinne =

Finnish footballer (born 1941)

Personal information
- Date of birth: 11 July 1941 (age 85)

International career
Years	Team	Apps	(Gls)
1964–1965	Finland	8	(0)

Aarno Rinne (born 11 July 1941) is a Finnish footballer. He played in eight matches for the Finland national football team from 1964 to 1965.
