= Aarne Saluveer =

Estonian conductor and music pedagogue

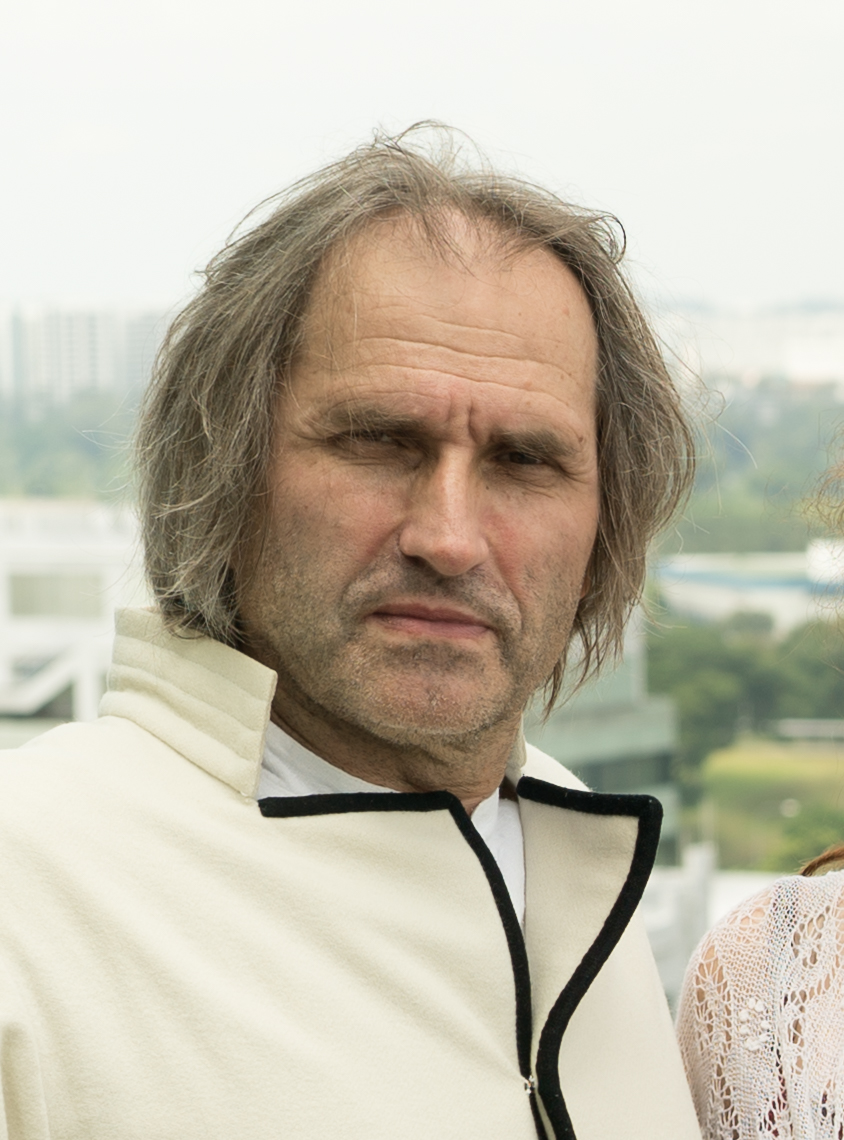
Aarne Saluveer in 2016

Aarne Saluveer (born 28 July 1959 in Tartu) is an Estonian conductor and music pedagogue. He is primarily known by his activity with children's music and children's choirs.

== Life and career ==
In 1982 he graduated from Tallinn State Conservatory in choral conducting and music pedagogue specialities.

In 1990 he established Lasteekraan Music Studio at Estonian Television. Until 2004 he was the music director and chief conductor of this studio. He has also conducted Estonian TV Girls' Choir. His choirs have won awards at Estonian and international choral contests.

Since 2006 he is the principal of Georg Ots Tallinn Music College.

He is one of the founders of Estonian Society for Music Education.

Awards:

- 2004: Order of the White Star, V class.
