= Aarne Veedla =

Estonian historian and politician

Aarne Veedla (born 26 November 1963) is an Estonian historian and politician.

Veedla was born in Valga. He was a member of VIII Riigikogu.
