= Toni Pulkkinen =

Finnish ice hockey player

- Born: November 1, 1990 (age 34); Vantaa, Finland
- Height: 5 ft 10 in (178 cm)
- Weight: 165 lb (75 kg; 11 st 11 lb)
- Position: Forward
- Shoots: Right
- SM-liiga team: Jokerit
- NHL draft: Undrafted
- Playing career: 2010–present

Toni Pulkkinen (born November 1, 1990) is a Finnish professional ice hockey player who currently plays for Jokerit of the SM-liiga.
