= Aarne Kauppinen =

Finnish politician

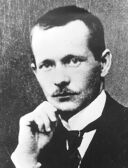
Aarne Kauppinen

Aarne Kauppinen (4 July 1889 in Rantasalmi – 7 July 1927) was a Finnish artisan, smallholder and politician. He served as a Member of the Parliament of Finland from 1919 to 1922, representing the Social Democratic Party of Finland (SDP).
