= Hyvinkää Church =

Church in Hyvinkää, Finland

Coordinates: 60°38′02″N 024°51′45″E

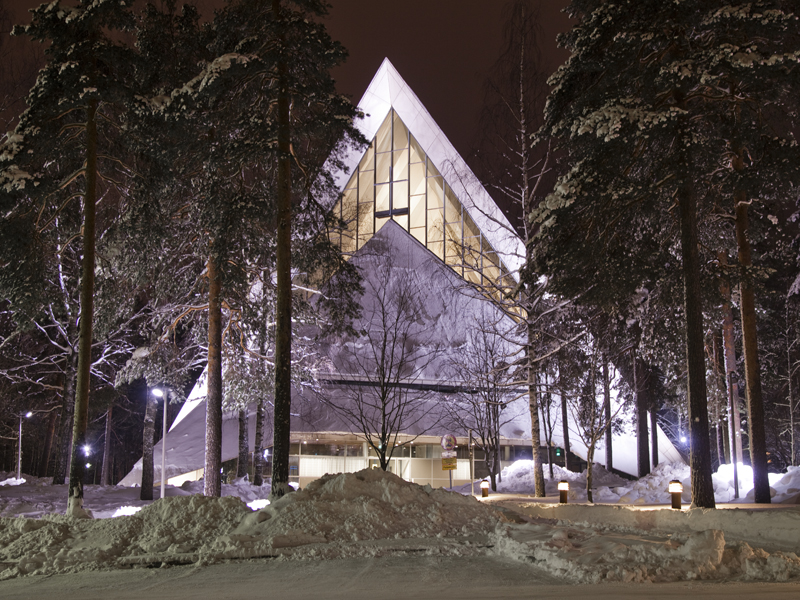
Hyvinkää Church

Hyvinkää Church (Finnish: Hyvinkään kirkko, Swedish: Hyvinge kyrka), also known as The New Church of Hyvinkää, is a modernist church of the Evangelical Lutheran Church of Finland, located in the town of Hyvinkää, Finland. It was designed by architect Aarno Ruusuvuori and built in 1961.

== Description ==
The church is 32 metres (105 ft) high and has 630 seats downstairs and 250 upstairs. The surface area of the church is 1,779 square metres (19,150 sq ft). Wide windows produce the lighting, behind the altar is a large window. The pyramid-like construction caused some criticism at the time.

The organ was built in 1977 by Hans Heinrich and has 35 stops.
