= Aarne Penttinen =

Finnish politician

Aarne Penttinen (9 April 1918, Sortavalan maalaiskunta – 13 July 1981) was a Finnish politician. He served as a Member of the Parliament of Finland from 1970 to 1972, representing the Finnish Rural Party (SMP).
