= Aarne Pulkkinen =

Finnish politician (1915–1977)

Aarne Ilmari Pulkkinen (1 January 1915, Pielavesi - 30 December 1977) was a Finnish smallholder and politician. He was a member of the Parliament of Finland from 1958 to 1970 and again from 1972 until his death in 1977, representing the Finnish People's Democratic League (SKDL). He was also active in the Communist Party of Finland (SKP).
