= Aarno Ruusuvuori =

Finnish architect (1925–1992)

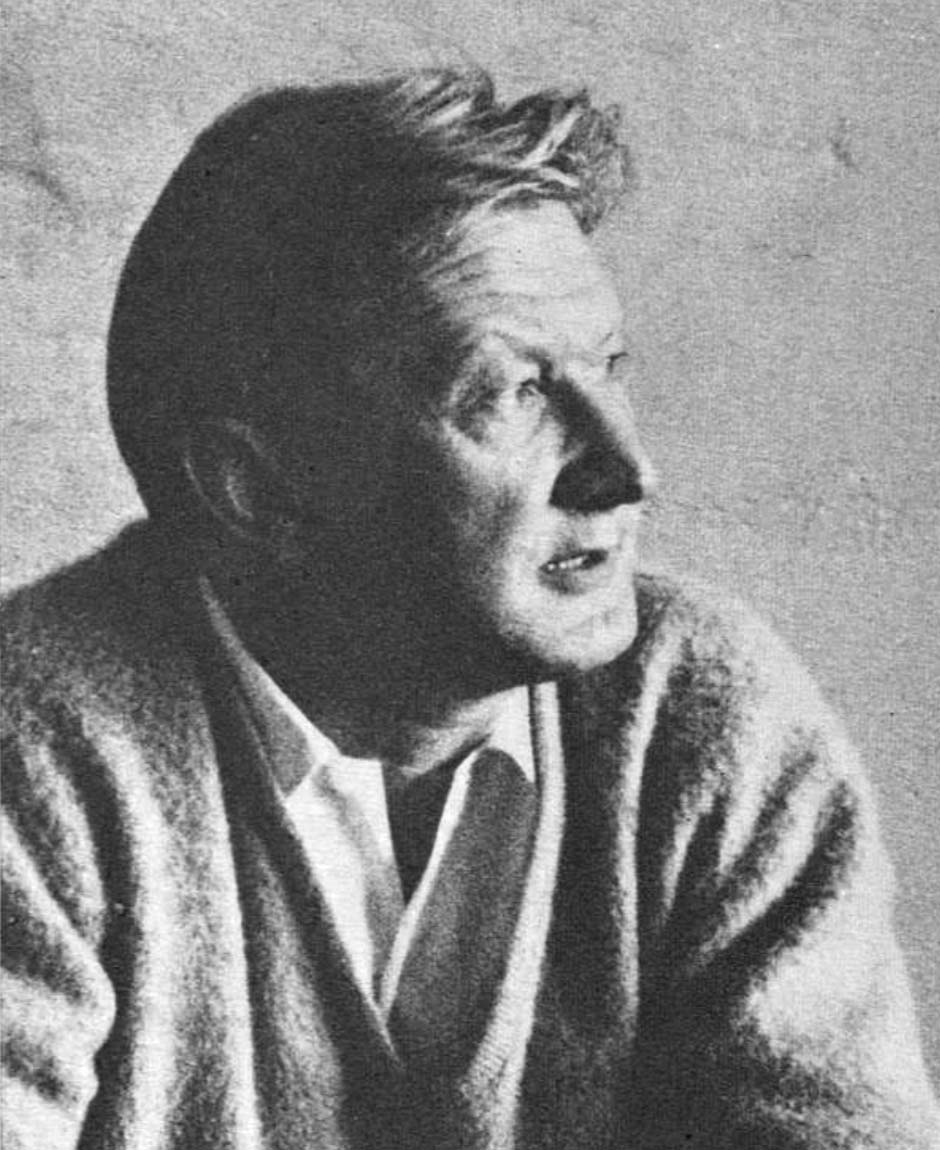
- Born: Aarno Emil Ruusuvuori; 14 January 1925; Helsinki, Finland
- Died: 22 February 1992 (aged 67)
- Occupation: Architect
- Practice: Arkkitehtitoimisto Aarno Ruusuvuori
- Buildings: Tapiola Church, Espoo; Weilin & Göös Print Works, Espoo; Helsinki City Hall, Helsinki; Hyvinkää Church
- Projects: Helsinki City Hall restoration and modernization, Helsinki; Finnish National Museum extension

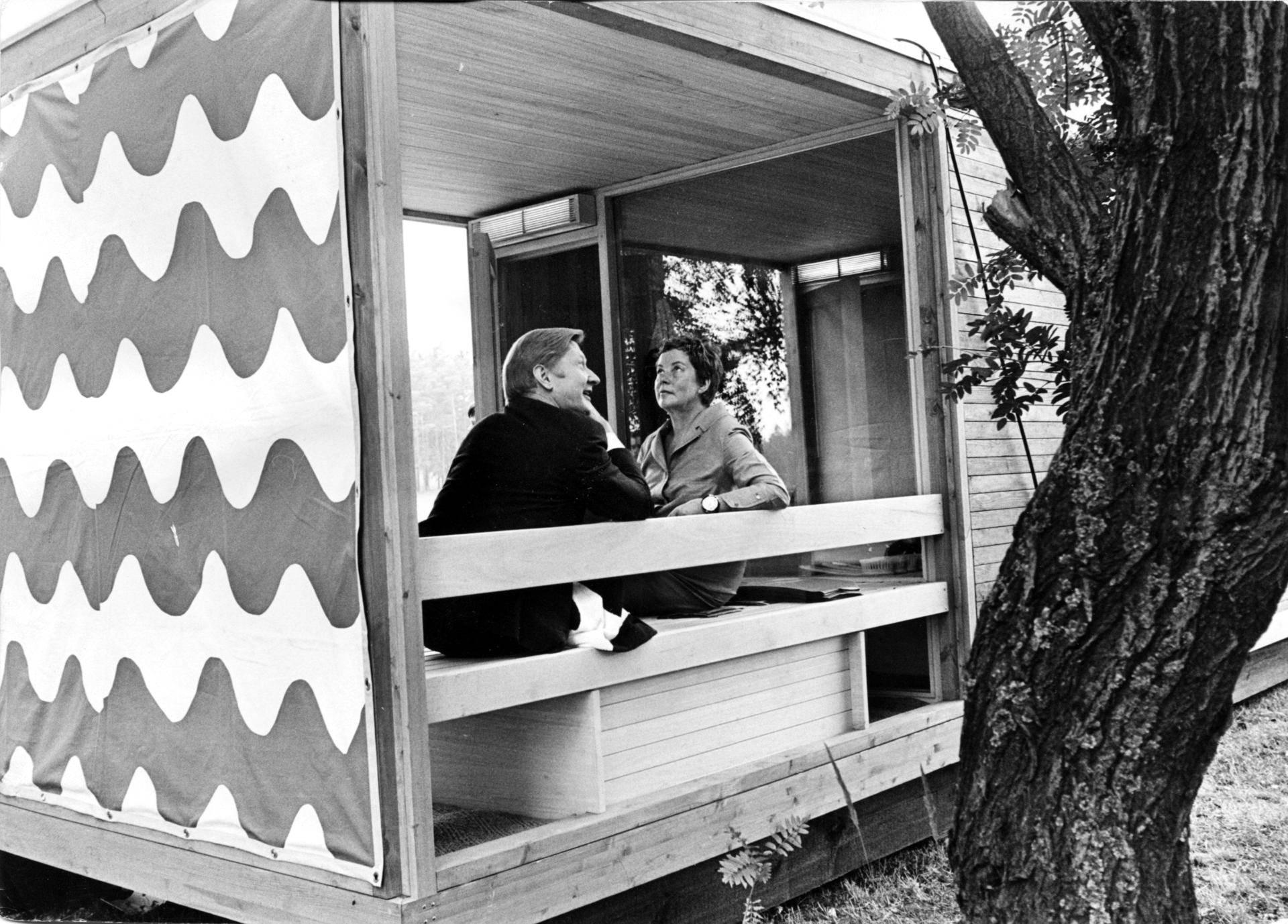
Movable Marisauna designed by Ruusuvuori and Armi Ratia (1968)

Aarno Emil Ruusuvuori (14 January 1925, Kuopio – 22 February 1992, Helsinki) was a Finnish architect, professor and director of the Museum of Finnish Architecture. Ruusuvuori was one of the most renowned architects in Finland during the 1960s, well known for designing modernist buildings, often using exposed concrete, often in the brutalist style. His best-known works are the Tapiola Church and the Weilin & Göös Print Works in Espoo (1964–66) and the Hyvinkää Church (1961).

== Biography ==
Ruusuvuori studied at the Helsinki University of Technology, completing his studies in 1951.

He created much controversy during the early 1970s with his ambitious plans for the modernisation of the Helsinki City Hall in the very centre of Helsinki. The City Hall takes up an entire city block, consisting mostly of several buildings built in the neo-classical style, including buildings designed by C.L. Engel. Ruusuvuori preserved the main festival hall but demolished many of the interiors, preserving only their facades. This saga, together with many other developments where historical buildings were demolished was captured in an influential book by architects Vilhelm Helander and Mikael Sundman, titled Kenen Helsinki? (Whose Helsinki?) (1970). Ruusuvuori continued to work on the large scheme throughout the 1970s, completing it in 1988, but toned down the scale of the earlier proposed demolitions.

The Weilin & Göös Print Works (1964–66), Espoo, designed by Ruusuvuori, was closed down at the end of the 20th century. It was then purchased by the City of Espoo, which had it converted into the WeeGee Exhibition Centre for culture and the arts, which opened its doors to the public in October 2006.

== Key works ==
- Hyvinkää Church, 1961.
- Merimiehenkatu 32, apartment block, Helsinki, 1962.
- Huutoniemi Church, Vaasa, 1964.
- Hämeenlinna Church, renovation, 1964.
- Weilin & Göös Print Works, Espoo, 1964–66 (converted into the WeeGee Exhibition Centre, 2006).
- Tapiola Church, Espoo, 1965.
- Roihuvuori School, Helsinki, 1967.
- Marimekko Print Works, Helsinki, 1967 (demolished).
- Marimekko Sauna, 1968.
- Mikkeli Police Station, 1968.
- Paragon office building, Helsinki, 1973.
- Sauna Bonsdorff, Padasjoki, 1987.
- Helsinki City Hall "restoration" and modernization, 1970 and 1988.
- Finnish National Museum extension, 1985 (unrealised)
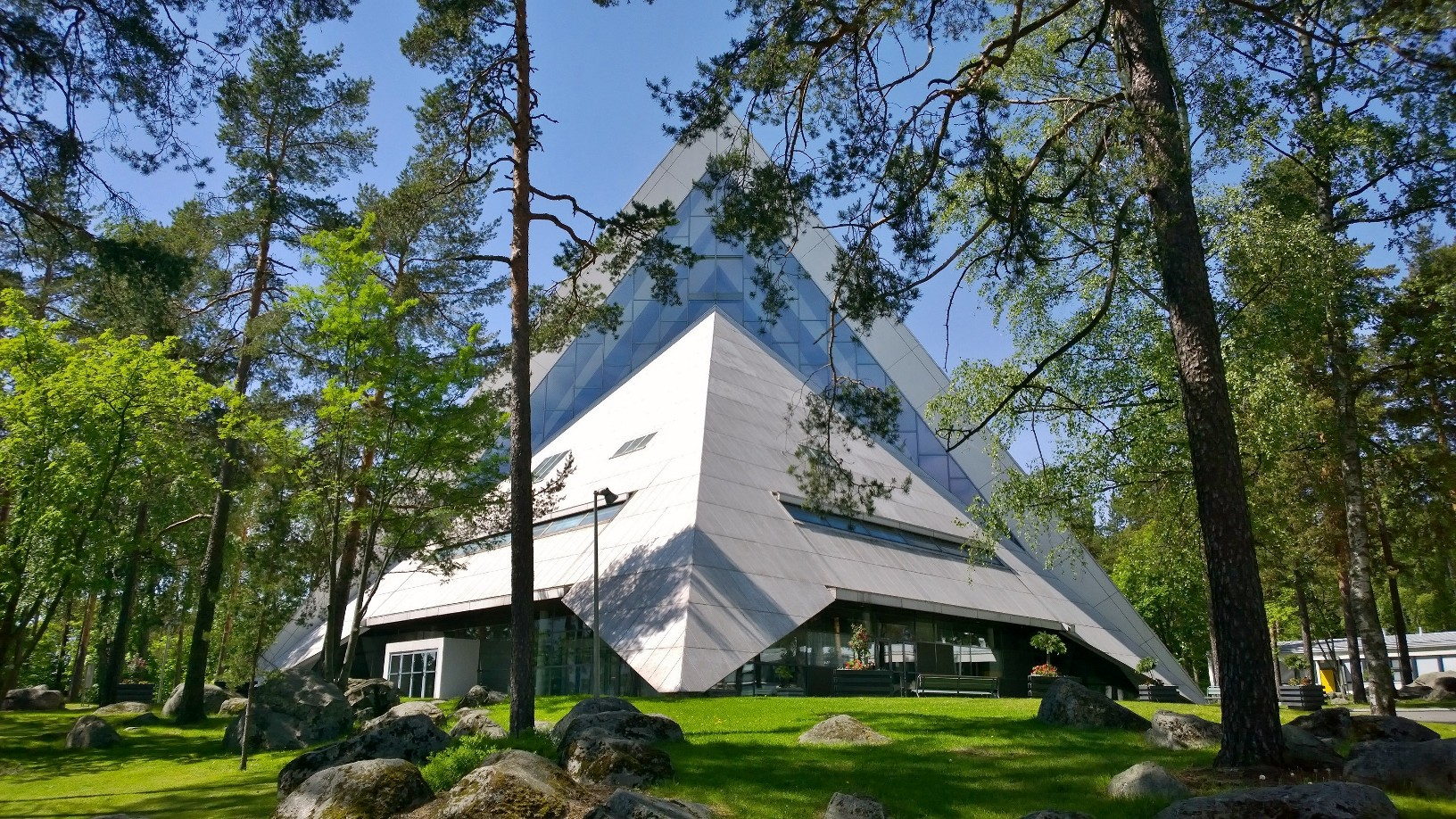
Hyvinkää Church, Hyvinkää

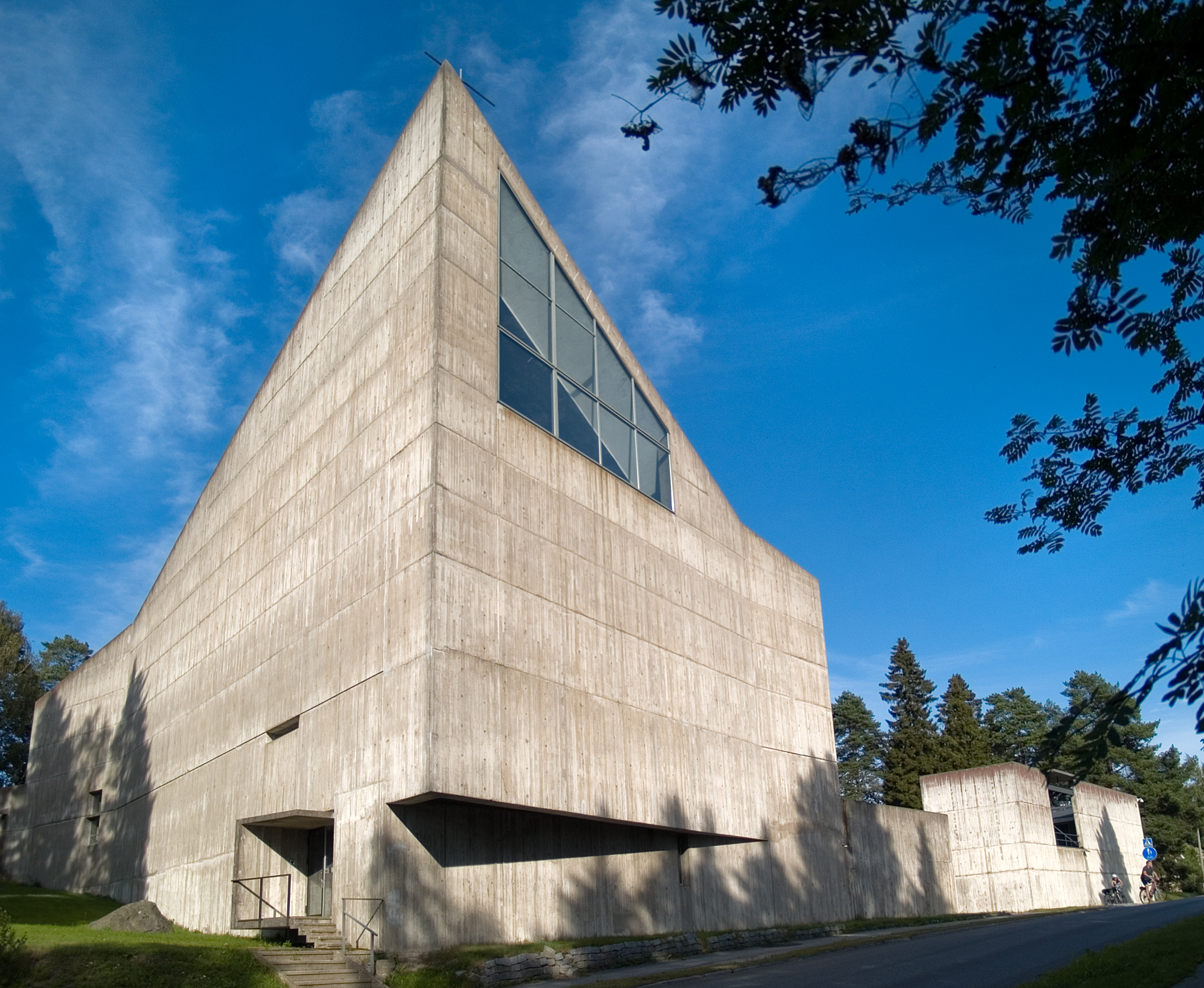
Huutoniemi Church, Vaasa

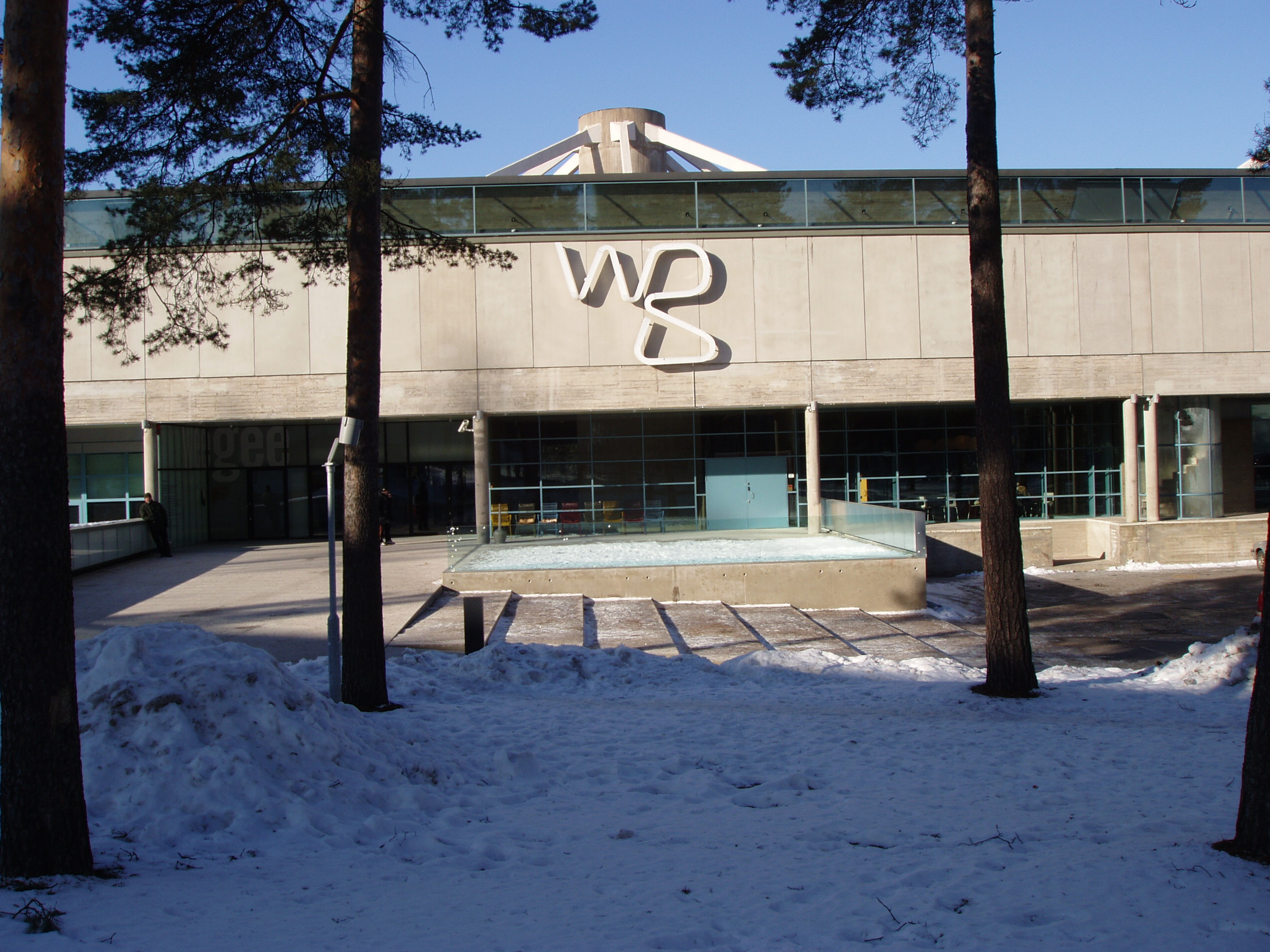
Weilin & Göös Print Works, Espoo

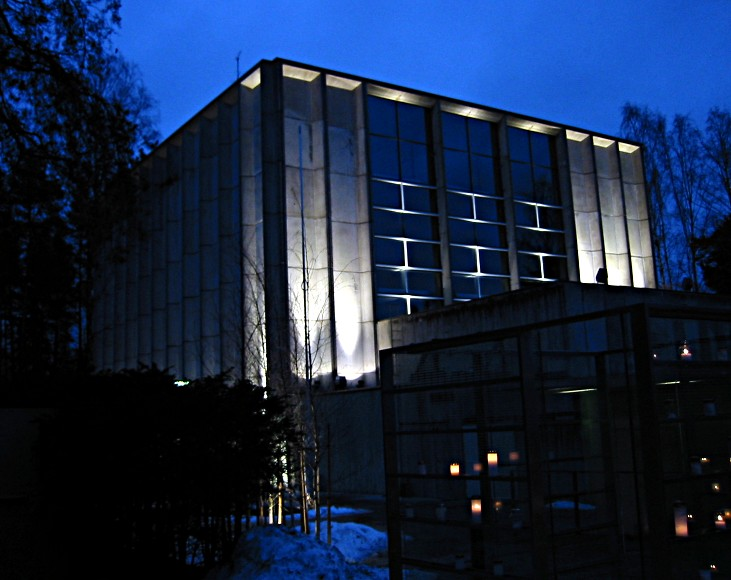
Tapiola Church, Espoo

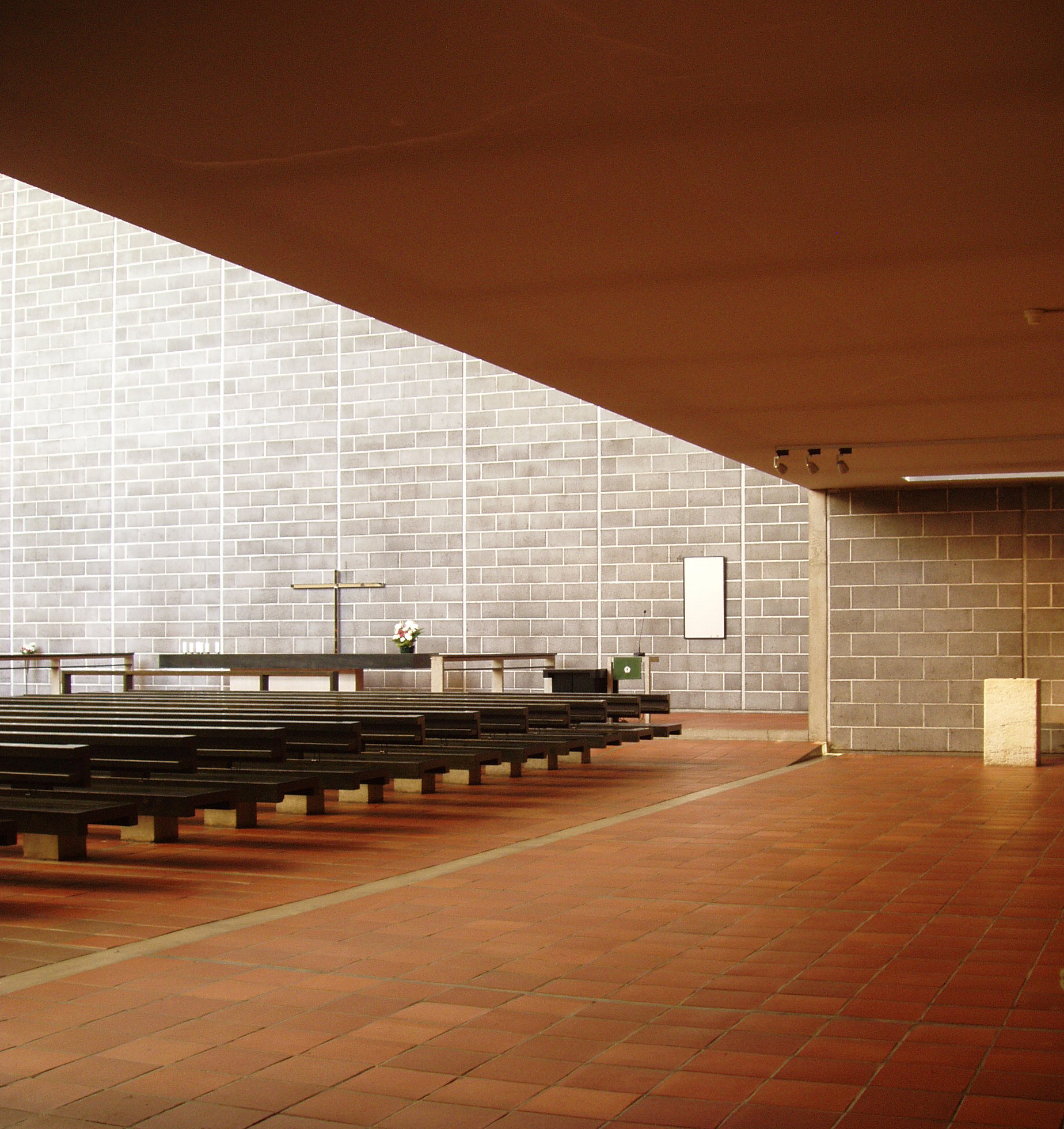
Tapiola Church interior

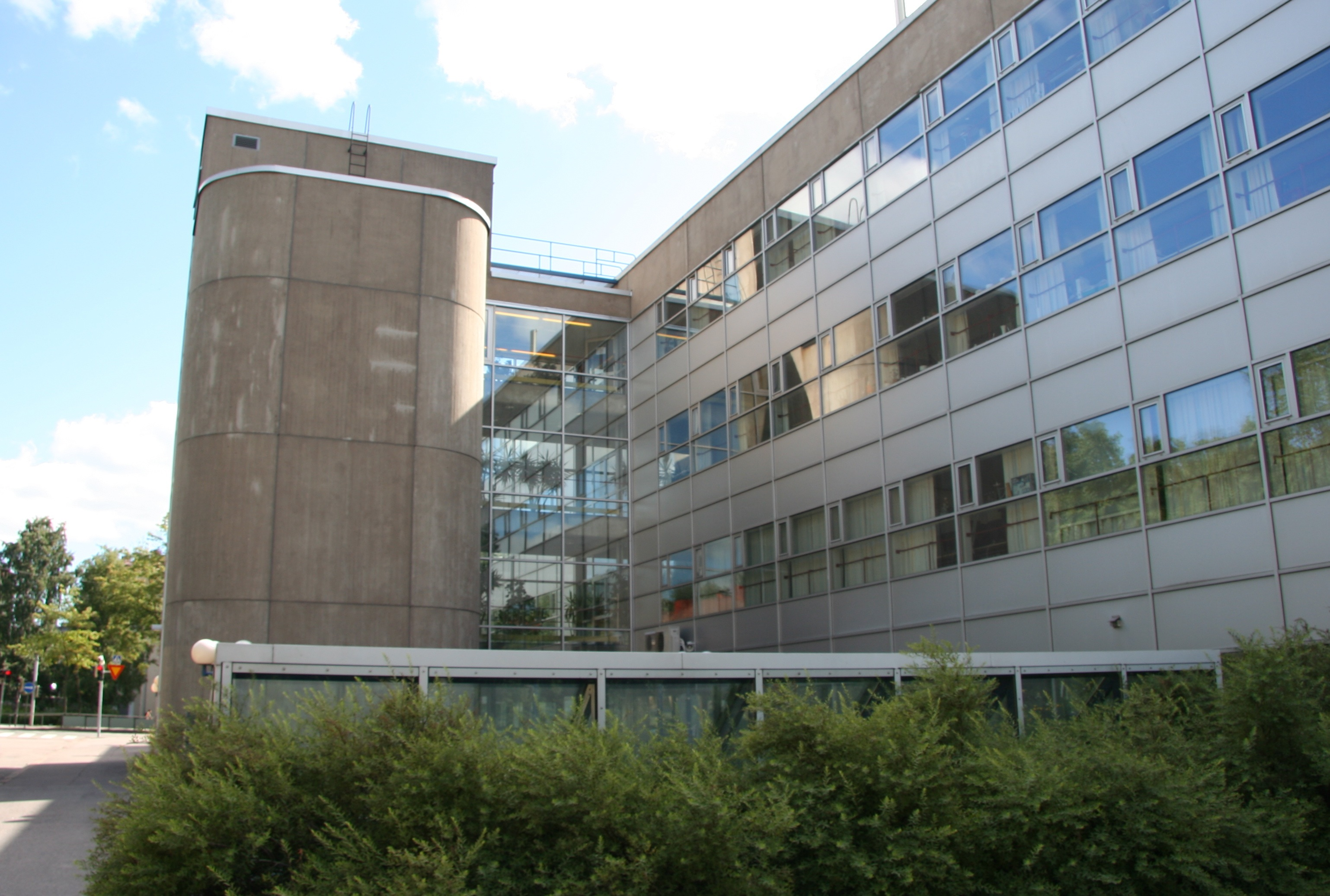
Former Paragon offices, Helsinki

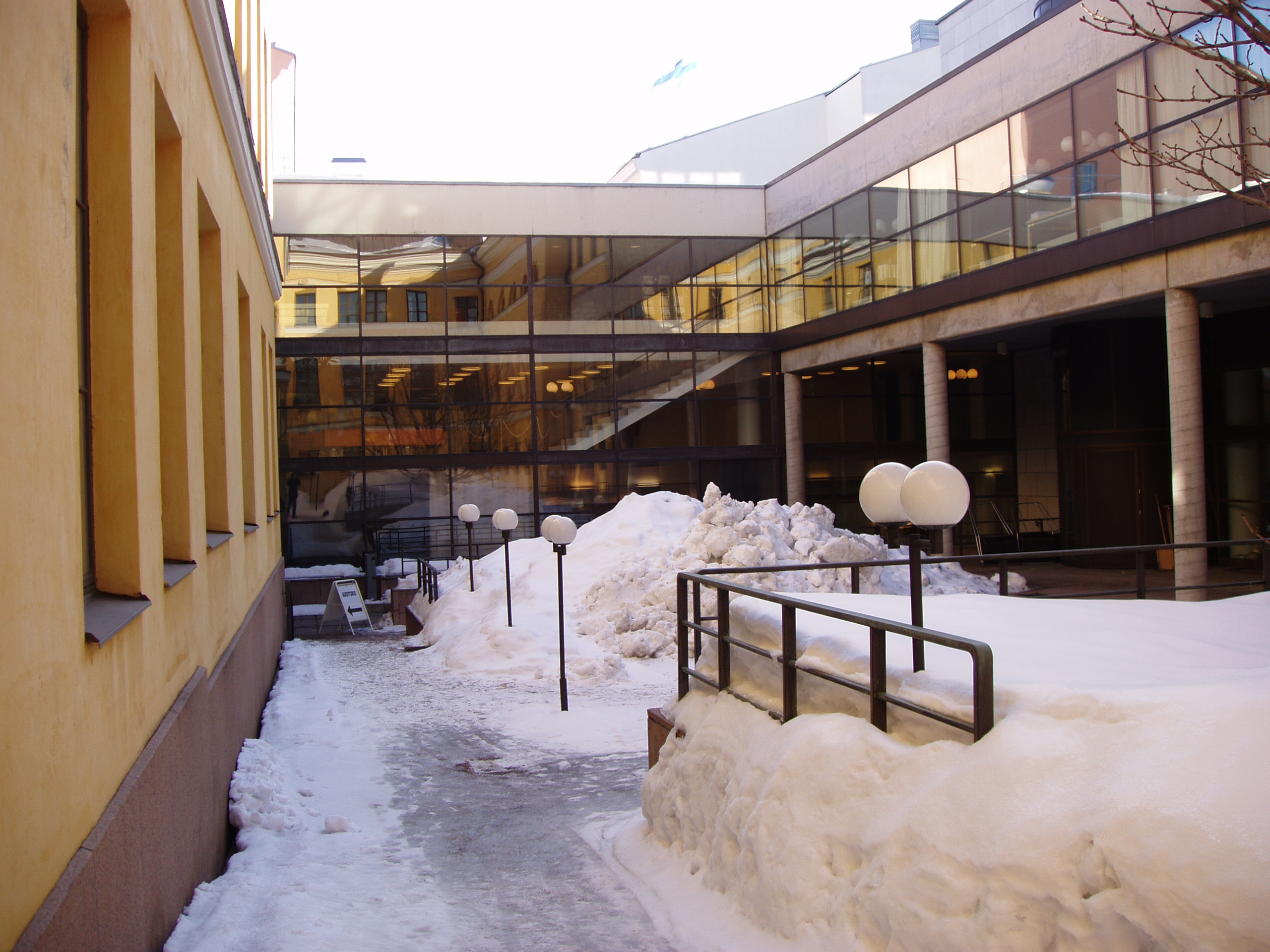
Helsinki City Hall extension

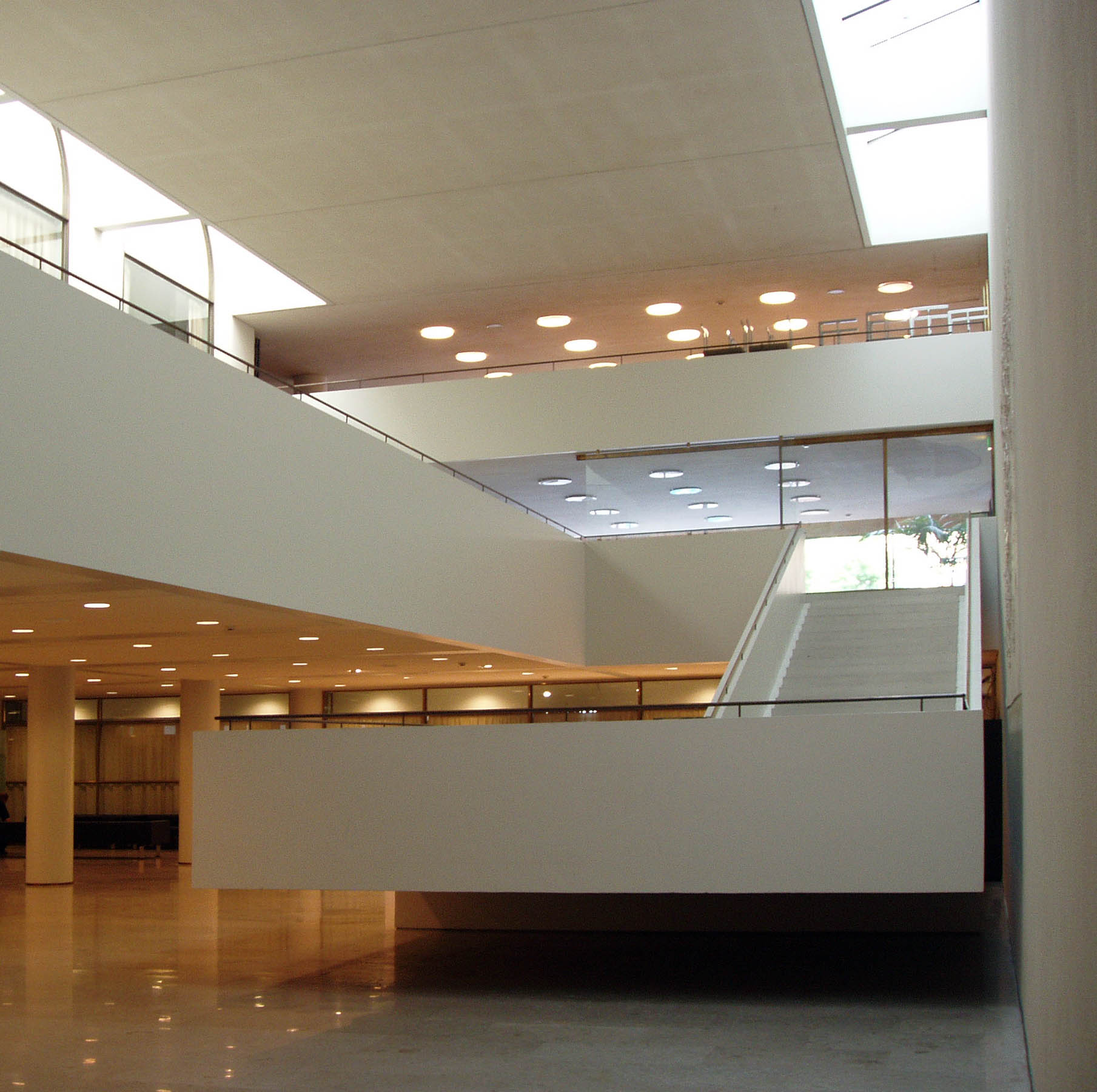
Helsinki City Hall modernised entrance hall

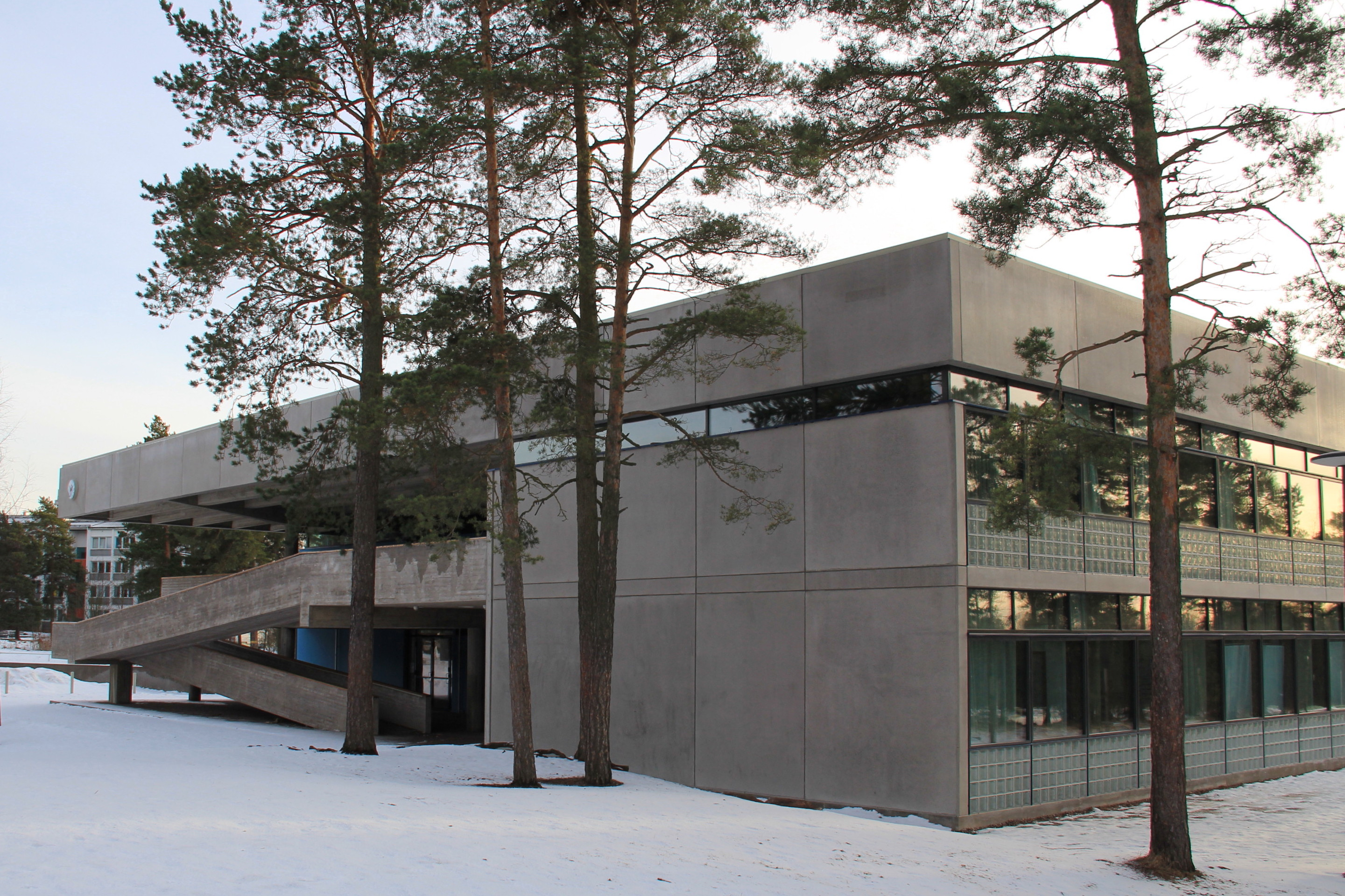
Roihuvuori Lower Comprehensive School

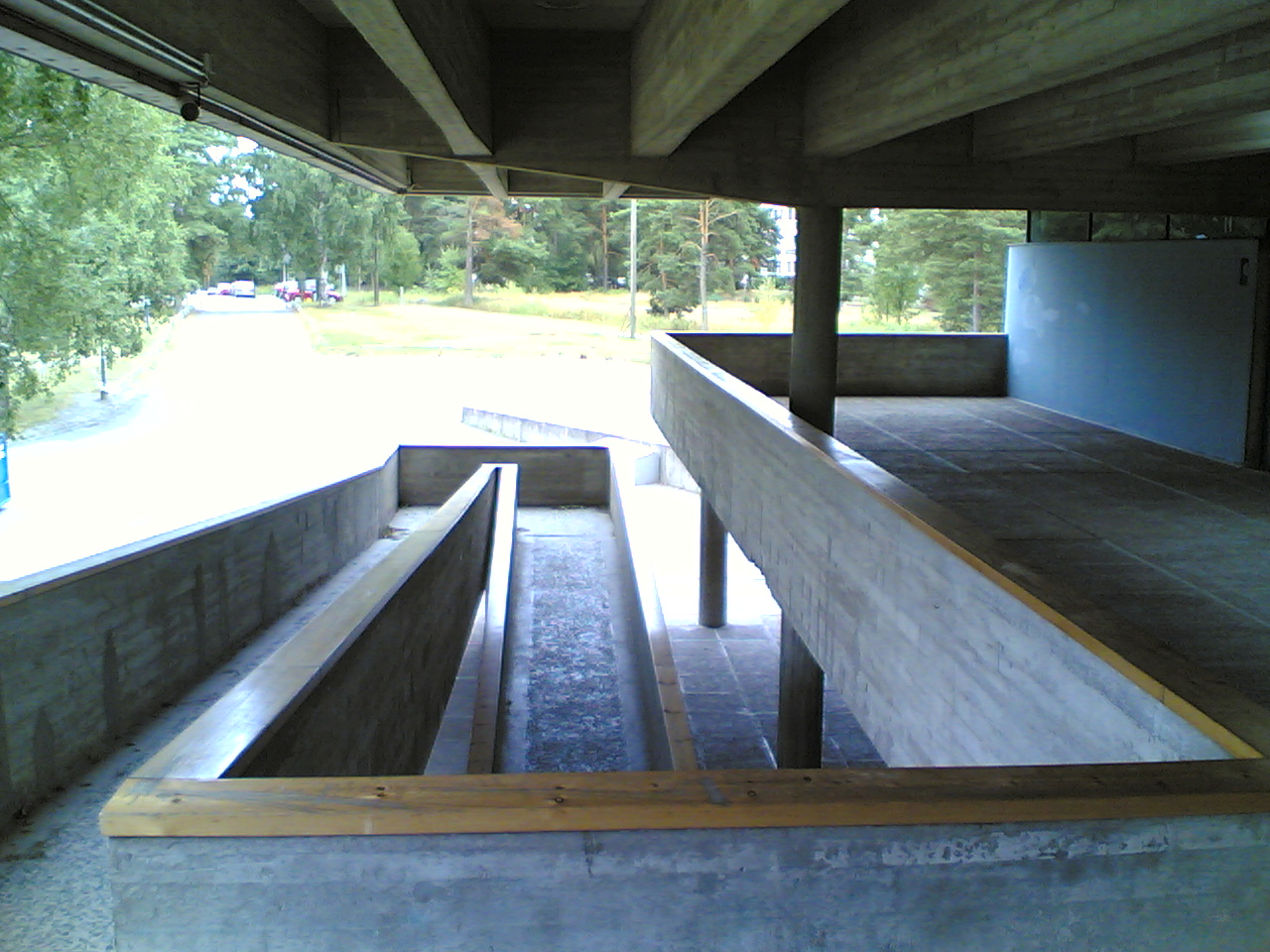
Lower Comprehensive School ramp
