= Arne (name) =

- Gender: Male

Origin
- Meaning: Eagle

Other names
- See also: Arnt

Arne is a common masculine given name for males in Scandinavia. It is also a surname in England.

The name Arne originates from the old Norse name Arnfinn, which in turn is derived from the old Norse name for "eagle" combined with the word for a Finnic or Sami person. The oldest attestation of the name is from a runestone in Vagnhärad dating to the 11th century.

The word arne also refers to the central stone on the floor of traditional Norwegian homes upon which the fire that provides the heating/cooking needs was lit. Similarly, "Arne" is Danish for the flame in a fireplace or old-fashioned oven or stove.

== Given name ==
=== People ===
- Arne Åhman (1925–2022), Swedish athlete
- Arne Åkerson (born 1940), Swedish Olympic sailor
- Arne Andersen (disambiguation), several people
- Arne Andersson (1917–2009), Swedish middle-distance runner
- Arne Arnardo (1912–1995), Norwegian circus performer and owner
- Arne Arvidsson (1929–2008), Swedish association football player
- Arne Bang-Hansen, Norwegian actor
- Arne Beurling (1905–1986), Swedish mathematician
- Arne Birkenstock (1967–2025), German film director and screenwriter
- Arne Björnberg (1908–1983), Swedish diplomat and civil servant
- Arne Bjørndal (1882–1965), Norwegian musician, composer, and folklorist
- Arne Borg (1901–1987), Swedish swimmer
- Arne Carlson (born 1934), American politician
- Arne Carlsson (disambiguation), several people
- Arne Søby Christensen (born 1945), Danish historian
- Arne Dahl (disambiguation), several people
- Arne Domnérus (1924–2008), Swedish musician
- Arne Duncan (born 1964), American politician
- Arne Elsholtz (1944–2016), German voice dubbing artist
- Arne Friedrich (born 1979), German professional footballer
- Arne Fältheim (1923–2001), Swedish diplomat
- Arne Garborg (1851–1924), Norwegian writer
- Arne Gaupset (1894–1976), Norwegian sport wrestler
- Arne Gauslaa (1913–1942), Norwegian communist, newspaper editor, and resistance member
- Arne L. Haugen (born 1939), Norwegian politician
- Arne Helleryd (1920–2009), Swedish diplomat
- Arne Høivik (1932-2017), Norwegian footballer
- Arne Høyer (1928–2010), Danish Olympic sprint canoer
- Arne Ileby (1913–1999), Norwegian association football player
- Arne Jacobsen (1902–1971), Danish architect and designer, exemplar of the "Danish Modern" style
- Arne Jensen (disambiguation), several people
- Arne Johansson (ice hockey) (1915–1956), Swedish ice hockey player
- Arne Johansson (orienteer) (born 1950), Swedish orienteering competitor
- Arne L. Kalleberg (born 1949), American sociologist
- Arne Kjörnsberg (1936–2023), Swedish politician
- Arne Korsmo (1900–1968), Norwegian architect
- Arne Landgraf (born 1977), German rower
- Arne Larsson (disambiguation), several people
- Arne Løchen (1850–1930), Norwegian psychologist, philosopher, and literary researcher
- Arne Maasik (born 1971), Estonian architect and photographer
- Arne Maier (born 1999), German professional association football player
- Arne Mattsson (1919–1995), Swedish film director
- Arne Mellnäs (1933–2002), Swedish composer
- Arne Merilai (born 1961), Estonian literary scholar, poet and novelist
- Arne Mikk (born 1934), Estonian stage director, theatre manager and teacher
- Arne Mohlin, Swedish Army lieutenant general
- Arne B. Mollén (1913–2000), Norwegian sports official
- Arne Møller (born 1960), Norwegian professional association football player
- Arne Næss (1912–2009), Norwegian philosopher
- Arne Næss Jr. (1937–2004), Norwegian businessman
- Arne Nordheim (1931–2010), Norwegian composer
- Arne Nore (born 1946), Norwegian businessman
- Arne Novák (1880–1939), Czech literary historian and critic
- Arne Oldberg (1872–1962), American pianist, composer, and teacher
- Arne Orrgård (born 1943), Swedish sports shooter
- Arne Øien (1928–1998), Norwegian economist and politician
- Arne Larsen Økland (born 1954), Norwegian association football player
- Arne Rustadstuen, Norwegian Nordic skier
- Arne aus den Ruthen, Mexican politician
- Arne Pedersen (1931–2013), Norwegian association football player
- Arne Pedersen (cyclist) (1917–1959), Danish cyclist
- Arne Petersen (1913–1990), Danish Olympic cyclist
- Arne Røisland (1923–1980), Norwegian association football player
- Arne Roosman (1932–2026), Estonian-Canadian artist
- Arne Sandstø (born 1966), Norwegian association football manager and former player
- Arne Selmosson (1931–2002), Swedish association football player
- Arne Semsrott (born 1988), German journalist and political writer
- Arne Skoog (1913–1999), Swedish journalist
- Arne Sletsjøe (born 1960), Norwegian mathematician and retired sprint canoer
- Arne Sletsjøe (violist) (1916–1999), Norwegian violist
- Arne Slot (born 1978), Dutch football manager
- Arne Sølvberg (born 1940), Norwegian computer scientist
- Arne Somersalo (1891–1941), Finnish officer and anti-communist activist
- Arne Sorenson (disambiguation), several people, including those named Arne Sørensen
- Arne Strid (born 1943), Swedish botanist
- Arne Sunde (1883–1972), Norwegian officer, Olympic shooter, and two-time President of the United Nations Security Council
- Arne Thomas (born 1975), German chemist
- Arne Tiselius (1902–1971), Swedish biochemist, Nobel Prize in Chemistry laureate in 1948
- Arne Toonen (born 1975), Dutch film director
- Arne Treholt (1942–2023), Norwegian politician and diplomat convicted for treason during the Cold War
- Arne Vinje (1943–2011), Norwegian chess player
- Arne Weise (1930–2019), Swedish journalist and television personality
- Arne Zetterström (1917–1945), Swedish underwater diver and researcher
- Lars-Arne Bölling (born 1944), Swedish cross-country skier
- Per-Arne Håkansson (born 1963), Swedish politician
- Tor-Arne Strøm (born 1952), Norwegian politician

== Surname ==
- Cecilia Arne, also known as Cecilia Young (1712–1789), English soprano, wife of Thomas and mother of Michael
- Michael Arne (c. 1740–1786), English composer, son of Thomas
- Peter Arne (1924–1983), British actor
- Thomas Arne (1710–1778), English composer

== Middle name ==
- John Arne Riise (born 1980), Norwegian association football manager and former player
- Odd Arne Westad (born 1960), Norwegian historian
- Per Arne Olsen (1961–2022), Norwegian politician

== Fictional characters ==
- Arne (mythology), several figures in Greek mythology, including:
  - Arne (daughter of Aeolus), mythological Greek princess
  - Arne Sithonis, mythologized Greek princess
- The title character of Arne Anka, a Swedish comic strip
- Arne Magnusson, a rude scientist in the video game Half-Life 2: Episode Two
- Arne "One-Eye", a supporting character in the first two seasons of the television series Vikings
- Arne Saknussemm, an alchemist and explorer in Jules Verne's novel Journey to the Center of the Earth
- Arne Nougatgren, a social worker in the Christmas calendar Jul på Vesterbro and the narrator and music teacher in Terkel i knibe
- Arne Skrydsbøl, one of the four main astronauts in Rejsen til Saturn

== See also ==
- Arne & Carlos, duo of textile designers
- Aarne
- Arne (disambiguation) for other uses of the name
