= Arne =

Arne may refer to:

== Places ==
- Arne, Dorset, England, a village
  - Arne RSPB reserve, a nature reserve adjacent to the village
- Arné, Hautes-Pyrénées, Midi-Pyrénées, France
- Arne (Boeotia), an ancient city in Boeotia, Greece
- Arne (Thessaly), an ancient city in Thessaly, Greece
- Arne, or modern Tell Aran, an ancient Arameans city near Aleppo, Syria
- Arne Township, Benson County, North Dakota, United States
- 959 Arne, an asteroid

== People and fictional and mythological characters ==
- Arne (name), a given name and a surname, including a list of people and fictional characters with the name
- Arne (mythology), the name of several figures in Greek mythology, including:
  - Arne (daughter of Aeolus)
  - Arne Sithonis
- half of Arne & Carlos, a Norwegian design duo

== See also ==
- Aarne
- Aarne–Thompson classification systems
- Arn (disambiguation)
