= Arn =

Arn may refer to:

== People ==
=== Given name ===
- Arn Anderson (born 1958), American professional wrestler
- Arn Menconi (born 1959), District 2 Commissioner in Eagle County, Colorado
- Arn Saba (born 1947), Canadian cartoonist, writer, media personality, stage performer and composer
- Arn of Salzburg (c. 750–821), Bishop of Salzburg and afterwards its first archbishop
- Arn Tellem (born 1954), American sports executive and player agent
- Arn von Endsee (died 892), Bishop of Würzburg from 855 until his death in 892

=== Surname ===
- Edward F. Arn (1906–1998), governor of the U.S. state of Kansas
- Gréta Arn (born 1979), Hungarian professional tennis player

=== Fictional characters ===
- Arn, the protagonist's friend in Hal Foster's Prince Valiant comic strip, and Valiant's first son, named after the friend
- Arn Magnusson, the fictional main character in the Crusades trilogy (1998–2000) by Swedish author Jan Guillou, as well as the film adaptation Arn: The Knight Templar (2007) based on the first two books of the trilogy

=== Others ===
- Arn., taxonomic author abbreviation of George Arnott Walker-Arnott (1799–1868), Scottish botanist
- Arn, an alien species in the Animorphs series by K. A. Applegate, featured in the books The Hork-Bajir Chronicles (1998) and The Prophecy (1999)

== Abbreviation ==
- arn, the ISO 639-2 code for the Mapudungun language, a language isolate spoken in central Chile and west central Argentina
- George Arnott Walker-Arnott, a Scottish botanist, known by the author abbreviation "Arn."
- Stockholm Arlanda Airport, an international airport located in Sigtuna Municipality, Sweden (IATA airport code)
- ARN, three letter abbreviation for Arnside railway station, Cumbria, England
- Alberta RailNet
- Aircraft registration number
- Arkansas Radio Network, a defunct United States regional radio network
- ARN Media, Australian media company, formerly known as Australian Radio Network, a free-to-air commercial radio network
- Access Research Network
- ARNnet, IDG Australian brand
- Allmänna reklamationsnämnden
- Accelerated Return Note (ARN)
- Amazon Resource Name, a term used in Amazon Web Services
- Acute retinal necrosis
- Acquirer Reference Number, an identifier used in credit card transactions

== See also ==
- Aarne, a surname
- Arne (disambiguation)
