= Freiheitsfonds =

German political initiative

Freedom Fund
- Freiheitsfonds
- Freiheitsfonds logo
- Formation: December 2021
- Founder: Arne Semsrott
- Purpose: Political initiative
- Location: Berlin, Germany
- Website: Official website (English)

Freiheitsfonds (German pronunciation: [ˈfʁaɪhaɪtsˌfõː], English: Freedom Fund) is a German political initiative founded by Arne Semsrott in December 2021. The organisation raises funds in order to free prisoners who have been incarcerated under the substitute imprisonment law, which allows judges to impose custodial sentences for unpaid public transport fares. It also advocates decriminalising the act of riding on public transport without a ticket, which was made an offence by Nazi-ruled Germany in 1935. As of September 2023, Semsrott and Freiheitsfonds had raised more than €800,000 and allowed 850 people to leave prison early. The group estimates that its actions save the German state an average of €150 per day per person released from prison.

== Background and law ==
In German law, the concept of Ersatzfreiheitsstrafe, or substitute imprisonment, legislates for a custodial sentence to be imposed in the case of an unpaid fine. Section 265a of the German penal code lists various acts, including travelling on public transport without payment, as offences punishable by a fine or up to one year in prison. Fare evasion is the most commonly punished offence under this law, which was enacted by the Nazi-controlled government in 1935. In the first instance, those found to be travelling without a valid ticket are subject to a penalty fare of €60, which is administered by the public transport provider. If this is not paid, the provider may refer the case to the police, following which a custodial sentence can be imposed by a judge. By the time such cases appear in court, the total owing averages around €1,000 after late payment and administrative fees have been added; this corresponds to an average prison sentence of two months. Any person incarcerated under the substitute imprisonment law can be released immediately by full payment of the money owed. Serial offenders may be referred directly to the police without an initial penalty fare being demanded.

Freiheitsfonds has estimated that in 2019 around 7,000 individuals were given custodial sentences for non-payment of transport fares, about 10 per cent of Germany's prison population. The group argues that the law unfairly discriminates against those from lower socio-economic backgrounds as well as people from ethnic minorities. According to figures published by Die Tageszeitung, 87 per cent of those imprisoned for fare evasion are unemployed and 15 per cent have no permanent address. Consequences for those imprisoned may include being evicted from temporary accommodation, losing places on rehabilitation or training schemes, and issues with asylum applications.

== Organisational activities ==
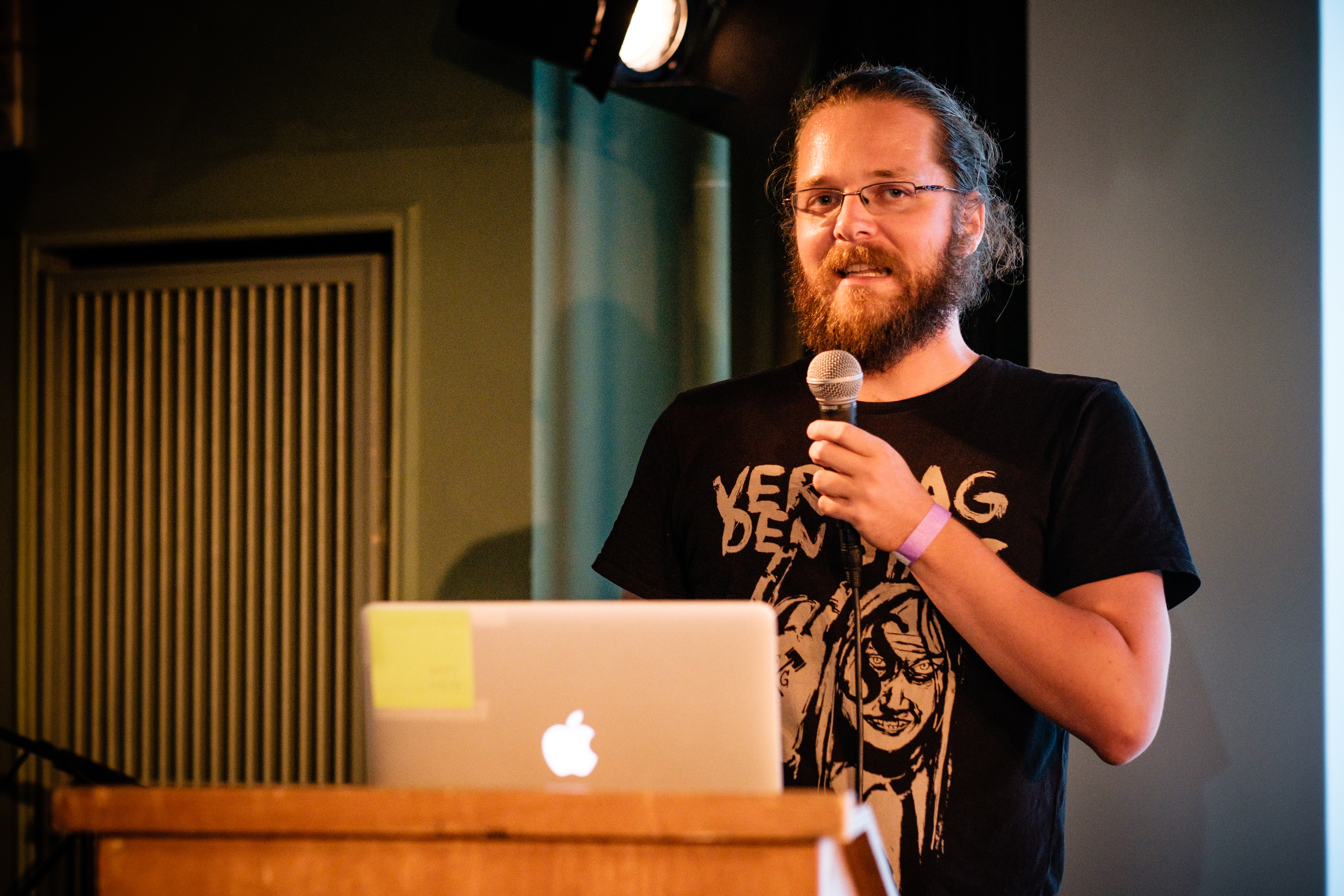
Freiheitsfonds founder Arne Semsrott

Journalist and activist Arne Semsrott founded Freiheitsfonds in December 2021, after learning about a 1990 ruling by the German Federal Court of Justice, which determined that the payment of a fine could be made by a third party. This gave him the idea of raising money in order to pay the fines of those imprisoned for fare evasion and secure their release. Semsrott originally raised €28,800 through donations from friends. On 2 and 3 December, he visited two prisons in Berlin—Plötzensee and Lichtenberg—and paid off the fines of 21 prisoners (12 men and 9 women). This initial action gained publicity through a post on the website of freedom of information campaign group FragDenStaat and coverage on Jan Böhmermann's television show Magazin Royale. Semsrott announced that over the following weekend, some 4,000 donors had collectively given more than €200,000 to the initiative. By the end of December 2021, Freiheitsfonds had spent around €100,000 securing the release of 83 people. As of September 2023, this had risen to more than €800,000 and around 850 prisoners.

In order for a prisoner to have their fine paid, they must give their consent to Freiheitsfonds in advance. The initiative has raised awareness among inmate populations through advertisements in Der Lichtblick, a free magazine distributed in German prisons. Prison staff also contact Freiheitsfonds to inform it of eligible prisoners, and some institutions have given application forms upon arrival to those sentenced under the substitute imprisonment law. Although payments can be made by any means, Semsrott has stated he prefers to visit the prison in person and pay the fines in cash, so that the inmates can be released immediately.

The longer-term aims of Freiheitsfonds extend to abolishing the substitute imprisonment law and promoting the introduction of free local public transport throughout Germany. The initiative has suggested downgrading fare evasion from a criminal offence to a summary misdemeanour, or Ordnungswidrigkeit, similar to jaywalking and illegal parking. According to Semsrott, this is necessary because paying for a person's release does not preclude them from returning to prison for repeating the offence in the future.

Freiheitsfonds has predominantly assisted people in Berlin, where the initiative is based, but has also helped affected people in other cities such as Bremen, Frankfurt and Hanover, as well as three people in the state of Saarland. It estimates that based on the cost of housing a person in prison in Germany, its actions save the German state between €130 and €180 per day per prisoner released. According to Freiheitsfonds' figures, roughly €150,000 in donations resulted in €1.5 million in savings for taxpayers, a ratio of 10 to 1.

== Reaction ==
Feedback from prisons towards the work of Freiheitsfonds has been generally positive, despite Semsrott's initial assumptions that they would be opposed to it. The Saarland Poverty Conference (Saarländische Armutskonferenz) and Petra Berg, the Minister for Transport in the Saarland Landtag, have supported the initiative.

The Association of German Transport Companies has stated its opposition to changes in the laws regarding fare evasion, arguing that the threat of imprisonment acts as a deterrent against travelling without a ticket, claiming that lost revenue costs the industry some €300 million per year.

== Visual identity ==
Freiheitsfonds' visual identity, such as its logo and website design, heavily references the Grand Theft Auto series of video games. The logo uses the same Pricedown typeface as the logo of the video games, although with a euro symbol replacing the second "e" in "Freiheitsfonds." Other graphics published by the organisation have also used various fonts from the GTA series.

== See also ==
- Criminalization of poverty
- Debtors' prison
