= Nordischer Klang =

Nordic culture festival in Germany

- Genre: music, culture
- Dates: May
- Locations: Greifswald, Germany
- Founded: 1992
- Patron: Nordischer Klang e.V.
- Website: nordischerklang.de

Nordischer Klang (English: Nordic Sound) is the largest festival of Nordic culture in Germany. It is a major platform for artists from Denmark, Finland, Iceland, Norway, and Sweden in Germany. The festival takes place in the town of Greifswald, which is situated about 200 km to the north of Germany's capital Berlin at the Baltic shore.

Nordischer Klang is organised by a non-profit society loosely associated with the Department of Nordic Studies at the University of Greifswald.

== History ==
The festival began in 1992 and has since then taken place every year. A wide range of activities is offered every year, covering the whole spectrum of culture in the form of live performances, exhibitions, shows, lectures and courses, e.g. about film, theatre, literature, social developments, comedy, and different types of music.

The festival is usually under the patronage of one politician from Germany and one from the Nordic countries.

2007 The 16th festival in 2007 was under the aegis of Harald Ringstorff (then governor of Mecklenburg-Vorpommern) and the Minister of Culture of Denmark.

2008 The 17th festival took place from 2 to 9 May under the patronage of Thorgerdur Katrín Gunnarsdóttir (Minister of Culture of Iceland). Among the performing guests were the Scandinavian Jazz stars Viktoria Tolstoy and LaGaylia Frazier.

2009 The 18th festival from 2 to 9 May was under the aegis of Erwin Sellering (the governor of Mecklenburg-Vorpommern) and Alexander Stubb (Minister of Foreign of Finland). Headliners were the Finnish singer Johanna Iivanainen, who played together with the saxophonist Eero Koivistoinen auftrat, the Marilyn Mazur Group and the sami singer Sofia Jannok. There were also different comic-exhibitions, amongst others drawings by Steffen Kverneland.

2010 The 19th festival took place from 6 to 15 May. It was under the patronage of Norway and Erwin Sellering (the governor of Mecklenburg-Vorpommern) and Alexander Stubb (Minister of Foreign of Finland). Highlights were the concerts of the Danish progressive/rock-band The Savage Rose, the Swedish entertainer Sylvia Vrethammar and the Valkyrien Allstars, a folk/pop-group from Norway.

2011 In 2011 the Nordischer Klang celebrated its 20th birthday from 5 to 15 May. Lena Adelsohn Liljeroth the Swedish Minister of Culture had the patronage. Great acts were the Elin Larsson Group (S), the Jan Lundgren Trio & LaGaylia (S/USA; Special guest: Lars Danielsson), a Danish pop-night with the bands Bird and Catbird, the Finnish Wimme Saari Group and the event "Universum" (universe) from Per Kirkeby.

2012 Under the motto "mächtig gewaltig" (mighty giant) the 21st Nordische Klang took place from 3 to 14 May under the patronage of Denmark's Minister of Culture Uffe Elbæk together with the Governor of Mecklenburg-Vorpommern Erwin Sellering. The Olsen Gang was in town, when Morten Grunwald alias Benny, the last living actor of the criminal trio, who showed together with the MDR-presenter Janine Strahl-Oesterreich a new Biographie of the Egon-actor Ove Sprogøe. Musical highlights were the Swedish jazz-trombonist Nils Landgren together with the NDR Bigband, the Polish-Danish pop group Czesław Śpiewa, the Norwegian EstherOrkester and the finish band The Irrationals. Even the founder of the avant-garde jazz in the former Soviet Union Wjatscheslaw Ganelin came to the festival with his trio Priority.

2013 Under the patronage of Iceland too the 22nd Nordischer Klang took place from 2 to 13 May. It was opened with the performance by the Icelandic artist Anna María Björnsdóttir. A special was a music video, which was produced for Greifswald. Kitty Von-Sometime made it with her Weird Girls Project. 14 young women were filmed in crazy costumes in Greifswald. Other highlights were the indie-night with Møll from Norway and Tilbury from Iceland, the Finnish pop-group Popband Mariska & Pahat Sudet and the debut of the blues singer Jes Holtsøs alias Börge, a former actor of the Olsen gang.

2014

The 23rd Nordischer Klang took place from May 2 to 12 under the patronage of Finnish Minister of Education Krista Kiuru and the Prime Minister of Mecklenburg-Vorpommern, Erwin Sellering. The festival opened with the German premiere of the symphonic jazz poem “Suomi” by Finnish composer Heikki Sarmanto and Swedish jazz musician Nils Landgren, who performed with the Vorpommern Philharmonic Orchestra.

Performers included the band Andalusian Conspiracy (N), the Gothenburg Gadjos (S), the Roger Berg Big Band (S) with their Polish guest jazz musician Soyka, the indie-jazz band Johanna Elina Group (FIN/DK), the pan-Nordic vocal ensemble IKI, the country-pop band The Bandettes (S), and the band Ted Glen Extended (N), which even celebrated its international debut.

As part of “Nordischer Klang’s” focus on Finland, Greifswald was selected as a satellite location for the Frankfurt Book Fair in 2014.

2015

The cultural festival took place for the 24th time from May 1 to 10. The Kingdom of Norway served as the festival’s patron. Performers included, for example, the Norwegian trio Gammalgrass, the post-rock band Róa—who were performing outside of Iceland for the first time—the “Folkhall” band Snakka San, and SVER. Jazz bassist Kristin Korb, who lives in Denmark, made her second appearance at the festival.

2016

From May 5 to 15, the festival celebrated its 25th anniversary. A special feature of the 2016 edition was that all five Nordic embassies in Berlin served as patrons. In addition, Greenland was the focus of one evening’s program. Musical highlights included the Danish Radio Big Band, the instrumental pop band Wintergatan (S), the ska-pop-rockers Razika (N), the bagpipe folk group Trad.Attack! (EST), the indie-electro band Vök (IS), jazz soloist Birgitte Soojin, the jazz-punk trio Mopo (FIN), and the world-famous tuba virtuoso Øystein Baadsvik (N), who was accompanied by the innovative orchestra Musika Vitae (S).

2017

Nordischer Klang took place from May 4 to 14 under the patronage of Alice Bah Kuhnke, Sweden’s Minister of Culture and Democracy, and Erwin Sellering, Minister-President of Mecklenburg-Vorpommern. The festival’s headliner was Finnish accordion virtuoso Kimmo Pohjonen. Once again this year, Nordischer Klang offered a wide range of musical styles: from vocal folk hop by the Finnish girl band Tuuletar to alternative music by the Latvian project Kapl̩i, the Swedish jazz quartet led by composer Cennet Jönsson, the Vorpommern Philharmonic Orchestra with soloist Karen Dornbusch, the Greifswald University Symphony Orchestra with soloist Mika Seifert, Norwegian soul singer Lisa Nybrott, Estonian pianist Rein Rannap, the Krupka Trio from Norway, the Monday Night Big Band and Mimi Terris from Malmö, the Latin quartet led by Lázara Cachao and Edith Tamayo from Denmark, Cuba, and Mexico; the Icelandic electronic duo Rest in Beats; the girl band Echoes in Veil from Denmark; and even the Estonian folk-pop band Curly Strings and the soul-pop queen Miss Tati.

Exhibitions featured works by the Estonian artist Arne Maasik, Angelika Mousson from Bornholm, and the Danish artist Ken Denning.

In the Film section, the festival screened The Girl King by Mika Kaurismäki, The Other Side of Hope by Aki Kaurismäki, and Þrestir by Rúnar Rúnarsson.

The festival placed a special focus on comics and graphic novels. An information forum was held featuring Filippa Hella, Ola Hellsten, Annette Herzog, Espen K. Holtestaul, Kristian Krogh-Sørensen, Joachim Schiedermair, Øvind Vågnes, Nina Ernst, and Camilla Storskog.

The panel discussion on right-wing populism in Northern Europe was part of European Week. The mayor of Lund, Lennart Prytz, also addressed a similar topic in a lecture on democracy in the age of populism and elites.

The 100th anniversary of Finnish independence also left its mark on Nordischer Klang. Four events were dedicated to this occasion.

2018

The Nordic Sound festival took place from May 3 to 13 under the patronage of Estonian Minister of Culture Indrek Saar and Manuela Schwesig, Minister-President of the state of Mecklenburg-Vorpommern. The opening ceremony was held at the Theater Vorpommern in the presence of, among others, Mart Laanemäe, the Ambassador of the Republic of Estonia to Berlin, and former Federal President Joachim Gauck. The opening concert featured the 34-member Eesti Politsei- ja Piirivalveorkester (Estonian Police and Border Guard Orchestra), with singer Liisi Koikson, marking the largest guest ensemble in the festival’s history. Other performers included Tarabband and Frigg (Folk & World Music Night), the Marja Mortensson Trio and Vassvik (Sami joik), MiaMee and Opus (Electro Night), Sniksnak and Timshel (Indie Night), as well as Skenet (folk rock) and DoktorDoktor (hip-hop) at the closing celebration—each performing on a separate evening. On the final day, Andres Uibo gave an organ concert at St. Nikolai Cathedral.

2019

From May 3 to 13, the 28th edition of the music and culture festival took place on stages throughout Greifswald. Icelandic Prime Minister Katrín Jakobsdóttir served as patron alongside Manuela Schwesig, Minister-President of the state of Mecklenburg-Vorpommern. The lineup featured AyOwA, Broen, Moses Hightower, Sousou & Maher Cissoko, the Obi Trio feat. Denise Fontoura, Kajsa Balto, Sex Magick Wizards, Klaki, Ritva Nero, and Östblocket. Readings were given by Johan Harstad (Max, Mischa, and the Tet Offensive) and Johanna Sinisalo (Iron Sky: Renate and the Moon Nazis).

2020

Due to the COVID-19 pandemic, the Nordischer Klang festival took place digitally from May 8 to 18. Danish Minister of Culture Joy Mogensen served as patron alongside Mecklenburg-Vorpommerns Minister-President Manuela Schwesig. Following the opening ceremony, which was broadcast on the festival’s YouTube channel, Karmen Rõivassepp performed alongside her bassist, Adrian Christensen. In the days that followed, digital living room concerts were held by the artists Sousou & Maher Cissoko Band, Jaqee and Band, Rosa Cruz of the Rosa Cruz Trio, Myrra Rós Þrastardóttir together with Júlíus Óttar Björgvinsson, Mall Girl, the ensemble La Récréation, and several others.

The festival was also enriched by messages from bassist Ida Hvid (Blonde Bass) and pianist Esa Ylönen, as well as from the Pomeranian State Museum. In addition, several interviews were published featuring artists such as the musicians from the band Isák, as well as sailmaker Sebastian Hentschel and Norwegian language instructor Arnt Sundstøl.

2021

Due to the COVID-19 pandemic, the Nordischer Klang festival will be split into two parts and extended into the summer months. During the festival’s original dates, May 7–22, a virtual program featuring digital readings, colloquia, and concerts will be offered. On two weekends in July (July 23–25) and August (August 20–22), concerts will once again take place in Greifswald as part of open-air events. The festival is under the patronage of Mecklenburg-Vorpommern's Minister President Manuela Schwesig, together with a member of the Finnish government. In 2021, the festival celebrated its 30th anniversary.

2022

The 31st edition took place from May 2, 2022, to May 16, 2022. This year’s theme was the Åland Islands, featuring performances by Robert Zetterqvist & Quasimodo and Birdpeople, along with a cultural discussion on life and art in Åland and a panel discussion on the archipelago’s 100 years of autonomy.

2023

The 32nd edition of Nordischer Klang once again brought a full program of Northern European music, art, literature, and scholarship to the Hanseatic city. From May 5, 2023, to May 14, 2023, Greifswald once again served as the center of Northern Europe under Swedish patronage. This year’s patronage was held by Mecklenburg-Vormpommern’s Minister-President Manuela Schwesig and Swedish Minister of Culture Parisa Liljestrand. The festival opened on May 5 with a musical performance by Aurelia Dey from the patron country, Sweden. Monique Mai from Denmark and Paper Crown headlined the annually popular folk evening; in addition, the festival focused on the cultures of the indigenous Sámi community to mark the anniversaries of the Sámi parliaments in Finland and Sweden. The program included a double-concert evening featuring Sámi music, the film “Eatnameamet – Our Silent Struggle” by Suvi West, and a thematic panel discussion.

2024

For ten days, from May 3, 2024, to May 12, 2024, Greifswald once again celebrated Northern European culture, art, music, and science: The 33rd Nordic Sound Festival was held under the patronage of Manuela Schwesig (Minister-President of Mecklenburg-Vorpommern) and Heidy Purga (Minister of Culture of Estonia). On her first visit to Mecklenburg-Western Pomerania, Marika Linntam, the Ambassador of the Republic of Estonia, opened the festival. Soul queen Rita Ray performed the opening concert. The concert with the Estonian Sinfonietta ensemble—which has already performed at numerous world-renowned venues—was considered a very special highlight. The young jazz and soul singer, pianist, and composer Maja Mannila from Finland, accompanied by bass and drums, presented her own songs in her unique blend of R&B, soul, jazz, and gospel. Global Grooves brought the band Kalhala to Greifswald; the band is nominated for the 2026 Danish Music Award. As usual, the event appealed not only to music fans but also to enthusiasts of art, literature, and science.

2025

Under the patronage of Mecklenburg-Vorpommern’s Minister-President Manuela Schwesig and Iceland’s Minister of Culture Logi Einarsson, the Nordischer Klang 2025 took place from May 2, 2026, to May 11, 2026. The Icelandic patron attended the gala evening on November 2, 2025, in person. Shortly after receiving the Kulturförderpreis (Cultural Promotion Award) of Mecklenburg-Vorpommern in November 2024, the festival entered its 34th edition. As usual, the lineup for the 10-day festival offered musical delights for every taste and drew around 9,000 visitors to the small Northern Europe. For example, the band Northflip brought Finnish folk music to Greifswald, while Jessica Kiil, with her Congolese-Norwegian background, guaranteed a powerful Afro-pop concert. In addition, this year’s festival program was once again enriched by readings, exhibitions, films, and a variety of academic events, and “Kinderklang” (kid's Nordic Sound) provided exciting experiences even for the youngest visitors.

2026

The festival was held for the 35th time from May 8, 2026, to May 17, 2026. For the first time, the patron did not come directly from one of the six focus countries; Sirið Stenberg, the Faroese Minister of Culture and Foreign Affairs serving in 2025 and 2026, brought half of the patronage to the Faroe Islands and shared it with Manuela Schwesig, Minister-President of Mecklenburg-Vorpommern. Denmark was the partner country for the 35th festival. Festival director Marko Pantermöller, who was awarded the Federal Cross of Merit that same year, opened the festival on May 8 with a reception and a concert featuring Gitte Hænning. Another highlight was the action comedy by the Danish theater duo Don Gnu, who performed the final show of their nonverbal play Tennis as part of the festival. Jazz bassist Kristin Korb, who lives in Denmark, made her third appearance at the festival. Estonian photography, Swedish-Danish folk music, Norwegian groove, Finnish science, and Icelandic funk were just a few elements of the rich program that drew some 9,000 visitors to the galleries, conferences, and live performances in Greifswald over the course of ten days.

2027

The 36th edition of the festival will be held from May 7, 2026, to May, 16, 2026 under Finnish patronage. More information about the program, patronage, and partnerships will be posted on the festival's website shortly.

== Sponsors ==
The embassies of Denmark, Finland, Norway, and Sweden in Berlin as well as the city of Greifswald, the University of Greifswald and the state of Mecklenburg-Vorpommern give moral and financial support. Other major supporters are:

- Nordic Council of Ministers
- Danish Ministry of Science, Technology and Development
- Finland Institute, Swedish Institute
- Municipality of Kotka, Finland
- Kultur och Fritid, Lund, Schweden
- Danish Jazz Association
- Alfried Krupp von Bohlen und Halbach Foundation
- German-Finnic Society; German-Lithuanian Society
- Society of Friends and Benefactors of the University of Greifswald
- Sparkasse Vorpommern Foundation, Theater Vorpommern
