= Arne Larsen =

Arne Larsen may refer to:

- Arne Larsen (Nordic combined skier) (born 1937), Norwegian Nordic combined skier
- Arne Larsen (cross-country skier) (1909–1981), Norwegian cross-country skier

== See also ==
- Arne Larsson (disambiguation)
- Arne Larsen Økland, Norwegian footballer
