= Francisco I. Madero Municipality, Hidalgo =

Francisco I. Madero
- Municipality
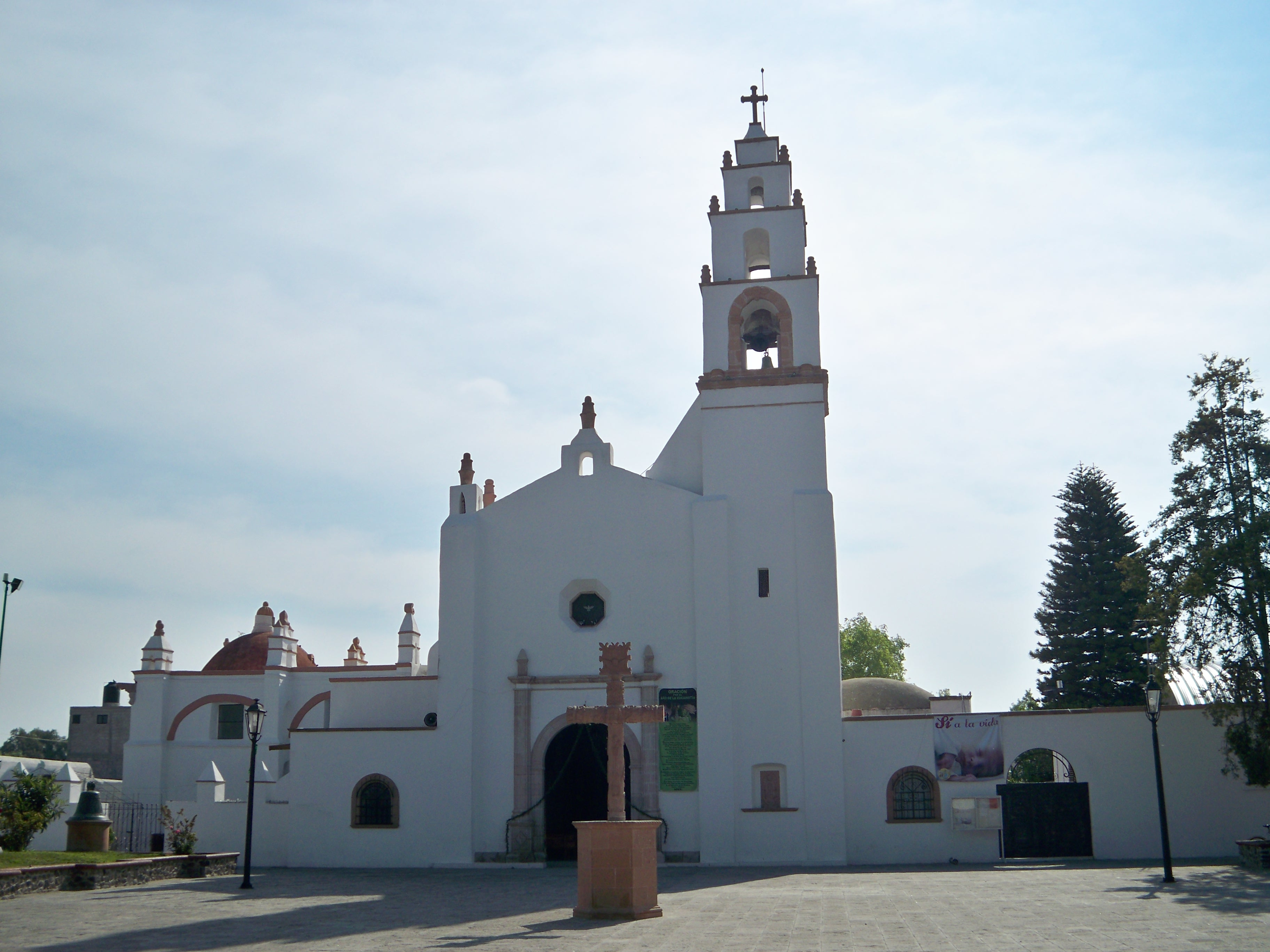

- Location within Hidalgo Location within Mexico
- Coordinates: 20°15′20″N 99°00′10″W
- Country: Mexico
- State: Hidalgo
- Municipal seat: Tepatepec

Government
  - Federal electoral district: Hidalgo's 6th

Area
  - Total: 95.1 km^{2} (36.7 sq mi)

Population (2005)
  - Total: 29,466
- Time zone: UTC-6 (Zona Centro)
- Website: franciscoimadero.gob.mx

Francisco I. Madero is one of the 84 municipalities of Hidalgo, in central-eastern Mexico. The municipal seat lies at Tepatepec. The municipality covers an area of 95.1 km^{2} (36.7 sq mi).

As of 2005, the municipality had a total population of 29,466.
