= Arne Sithonis =

Mythological ancient Greek princess

Arne (/ˈɑːrniː/; Ancient Greek: Ἄρνη) is a mythologized princess of an ancient Greek island, who according to legend betrayed her motherland, after the legendary king Minos had bribed her with gold into supporting Crete. After she had accepted the bribe that "her greed demanded", Minos' troops attacked the island. For this misdeed the gods punished her by turning her into a black-footed, black-winged jackdaw, and she would be forever attracted to golden and shining objects.

== Localization and chronology ==
The only source on Arne's story is Ovid's mythological poem Metamorphoses from 8 BC, where—depending on the manuscript—her name is given as Arne Sithonis or Arne Sithon ("the Sithonian Arne", meaning "the Thracian Arne"; see below). Attempts have been made to identify the island as Siphnos due to paleographical similarities, but no independent legend connects an Arne to Siphnos or any other island of the Cyclades.

Like Sithoniae (nurus), Sithonios (agros) and Sithon, Sithonis means "Thracian". Based on the original assumption of the legend's Cycladian origin (e.g. the island of Siphnos), the term Sithonis was doubted, because it was believed for a long time that the Thracians had never been to the Cyclades. Huxley (1984) however has shown that Sithonis in this case refers to the inhabitants of Naxos.

This origin was first proposed by Franz Börner, because Naxos (as the largest of the Cyclades) was missing in Ovid's extensive catalog of islands. In addition, Greek sources confirm that Thracians settled on Naxos for roughly two hundred years before they were replaced by Karian immigrants after a drought, two generations before the time of Theseus and Minos. Further evidence for Thracian settlements on Naxos are found in the lost Naxiaka of Andriskos, a local Naxian historian. They told the story about the two Thracian plunderers from Naxos, Skellis and Agassamenos, who raided the Peloponnese, the surrounding islands and eventually Thessaly. There they seized Iphimede, wife of Aloeus, and her daughter Pankrato.

Therefore, Huxley further suggests that Ἄρνη (Arne)—as a toponym of Thessalian "cities of origin"—could indicate that Arne Sithonis was a descendant of the women kidnapped by Skellis and Agassamenos and taken to Naxos. However, the word also denotes a Thracian place of origin. In any case, Arne Sithonis was in all probability a survivor of the Thracian population of Naxos amongst the Karians. As a possible alternative, Ovid may have been following "a version of the myth in which Thracians—not Karians—were still ruling Naxos in the time of Minos".

Huxley asserts that Ovid's mythographic or poetical source is unknown, but suggests Parthenius, because the Greek poet mentioned the Thracians of Naxos. The fact that "Thracian [of Naxos]" hides behind Ovid's Sithonis shows that the Cretan king Minos had also captured the island of Naxos, probably after visiting Paros.

== See also ==
- Arne (disambiguation)
- Arne (name)
- Arne (mythology), for other people in Greek mythology named Arne
