= Nico Semsrott =

German Kabarett artist

Nico Semsrott MEP
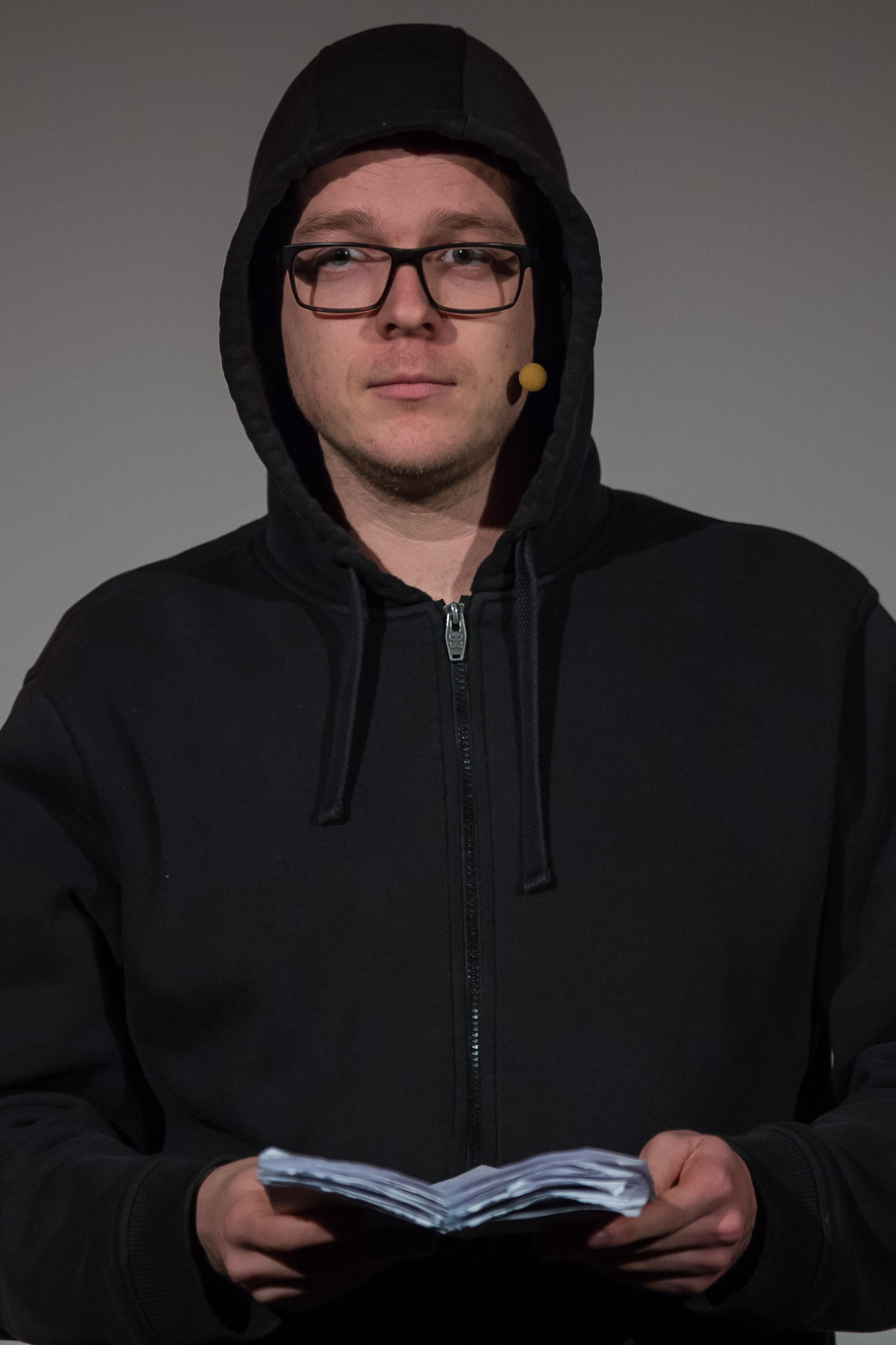

Member of the European Parliament for Germany
- In office 2 July 2019 – 15 July 2024
- Group: Greens/EFA
- Constituency: Germany

Personal details
- Born: 11 March 1986 (age 40) Hamburg, West Germany
- Party: Independent (since 2021)
- Other political affiliations: Die PARTEI (before 2021)
- Relatives: Arne Semsrott (brother)
- Website: https://nicosemsrott.eu/

Nico Semsrott (born 11 March 1986) is a German Kabarett artist, slam poet, and politician. He was elected as a Member of the European Parliament in 2019 as a member of Die PARTEI, but left the party in 2021, and sat as an independent.

== Career ==
=== Entertainment ===
In school, he founded the satirical school newspaper Sophie's Underworld (German: Sophies Unterwelt) together with his younger brother, Arne Semsrott at the Hamburg Sophie-Barat-Schule. Its sale was banned on the school grounds by the school's headmistress, though it was continued to be sold from a portable toilet.

Since 2008, Semsrott has portrayed a depressive persona on poetry slams and cabarets. He usually introduces himself to the audience as a “demotivational speaker”. This was also a profession on the ballot for the 2019 European elections.

His first solo show, titled "Joy is just a lack of information" (German: Freude ist nur ein Mangel an Informationen), premiered on 14 June 2012 in Hamburg. He performed updated versions from Autumn 2014 until Christmas 2018. In 2019, Semsrott announced a pause in favor of his political work. Semsrott was part of the ZDF heute-show team from 2017 until 2019, hosting the segment No Fun Facts.

=== Politics ===
Semsrott ran in the 2017 German federal election as leading candidate for Berlin for Die PARTEI, a satirical German political party, receiving 2.1% of the votes.

In the 2019 European elections, Semsrott was elected to the European Parliament as the second party-list candidate (behind Martin Sonneborn) from Die PARTEI. His party received 2.4%. Unlike other elections in Germany, there is no 5% electoral threshold concerning the European Parliament elections. In the run-up to the election Semsrott criticised the lack of attention given to younger generations in a TV advertisement. A survey made after the election showed that votes for Die PARTEI came especially from first-time voters (about 9% of this group), who cast more votes for it than for the SPD or the FDP, two establishment parties.

In May 2020, Semsrott revealed a series of thefts in the European Parliament. He published a video about the incidents on his YouTube channel, where he criticised the way the security staff were handling the investigation. He also published a timeline of the thefts and measures that were taken by him on his website. On 13 January 2021, he announced the resignation of his party membership from Die PARTEI after heavy controversies and accusations of racism and blackfacing emerged around the federal chairman Martin Sonneborn. Semsrott continued his mandate in the European Parliament as an independent member of parliament. He did not stand in the 2024 European election.

== Awards ==
- 2009: Winner NDR-Comedy Contest
- 2010: Karl-Marx-Poesie-Preis
- 2011: Stuttgarter Besen, audience award
- 2011: Kleines Passauer Scharfrichterbeil (3rd place)
- 2011: Winner NDR-Comedy Contest
- 2012: Die Freiburger Leiter
- 2014: Bayerischer Kabarettpreis, Senkrechtstarter
- 2017: Deutscher Kleinkunstpreis, category political satire
