= Xóchitl Gálvez =

Mexican politician (born 1963)

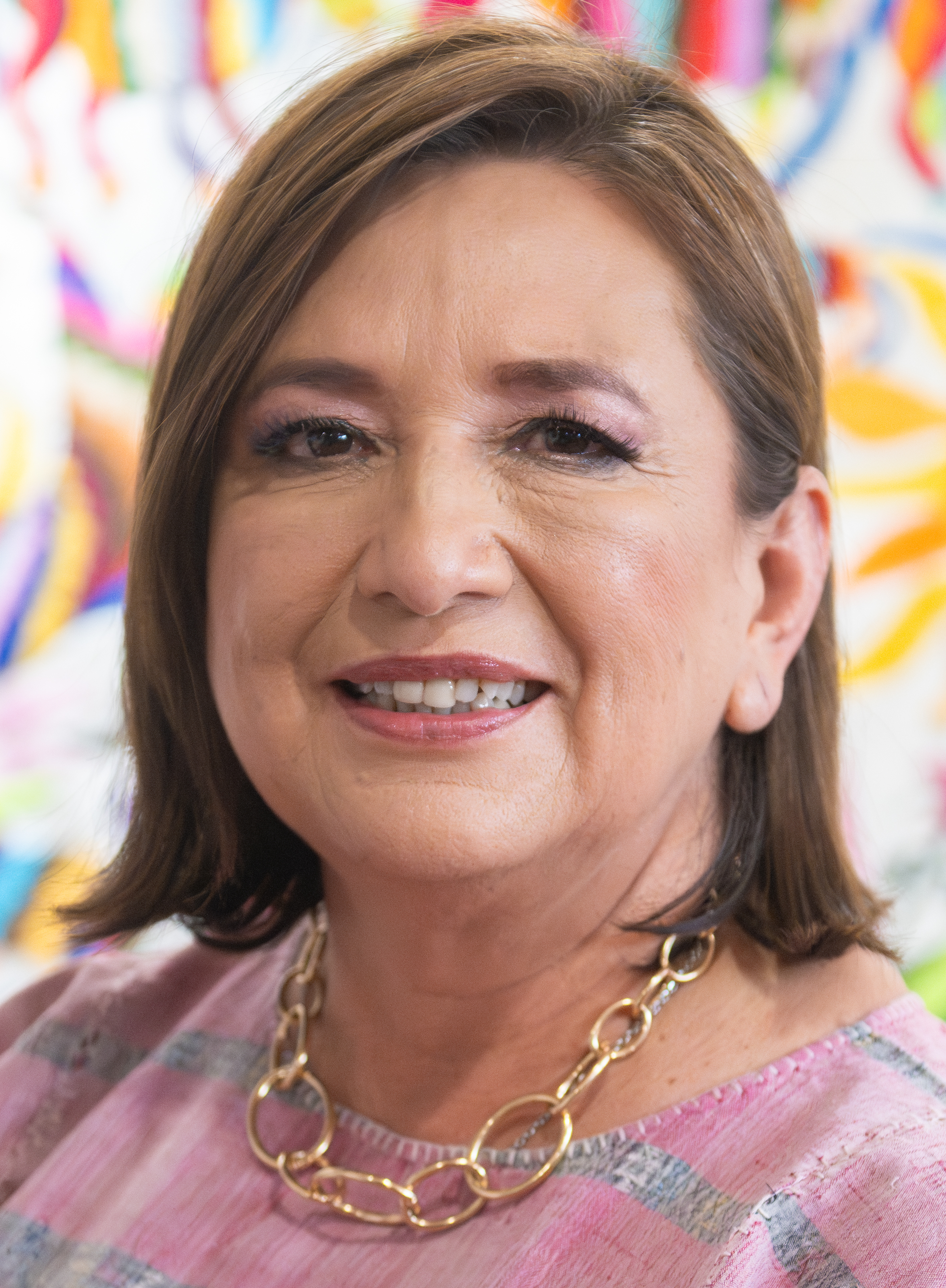
- Gálvez in 2024

Senator of the Republic Proportional representation
- In office 4 June 2024 – 31 August 2024
- Preceded by: Laura Ballesteros Mancilla
- In office 1 September 2018 – 20 November 2023
- Succeeded by: Laura Ballesteros Mancilla

Mayor of Miguel Hidalgo
- In office 1 October 2015 – 15 March 2018
- Preceded by: Víctor Hugo Romo de Vivar Guerra
- Succeeded by: José David Rodríguez Lara

General Director of the National Institute of Indigenous Peoples
- In office 21 May 2003 – 14 December 2006
- President: Vicente Fox
- Preceded by: Position established
- Succeeded by: Luis H. Álvarez

Personal details
- Born: Bertha Xóchitl Gálvez Ruiz; 22 February 1963 (age 63) Tepatepec, Hidalgo, Mexico
- Party: Independent (Note: Caucuses with the National Action Party in the Senate.)
- Children: 2
- Education: National Autonomous University of Mexico (BS)
- Occupation: Politician

Bertha Xóchitl Gálvez Ruiz (Spanish: [ˈsotʃitl]; born 22 February 1963) is a Mexican politician and businesswoman. From 2015 until 2018, she was mayor of Mexico City's Miguel Hidalgo borough. From 2018 to 2023, she was a plurinominal senator in the Mexican Congress's LXIV and LXV Legislatures. As a senator, Gálvez caucused with the center-right National Action Party but frequently supported progressive politics on social issues such as abortion, drug policy, and social spending. She graduated from the UNAM School of Engineering with a degree in computer engineering. She received the nomination as the Fuerza y Corazón por México coalition's nominee for the 2024 Mexican presidential election.

== Early years ==
Gálvez was born on 22 February 1963 in Tepatepec, Hidalgo, to an Indigenous Otomi father and a mestiza mother, also of partial Otomi ancestry. She claims that, as a child, she sold desserts at the local market to support her education and family. She moved to Mexico City at 16 to study computer engineering at the National Autonomous University of Mexico (UNAM), first working as a call center agent and later earning a position as a research assistant at UNAM's College of Engineering. She obtained her degree in Computer Engineering in 2010, according to information from the National Registry of Professionals (Registro Nacional de Profesionistas). A few years into her computer engineering degree, she worked as a programmer and later as a systems analyst at the National Institute of Geography and Statistics (INEGI). She was also director of telecommunications at the Mexico City World Trade Center.

From 2000 to 2006, she was head of the National Institute of Indigenous Peoples during the administration of Vicente Fox.

In the 2010 Hidalgo state elections, she was a candidate for governor of the state for the "Hidalgo Unites Us" coalition, made up of the National Action Party (PAN), the Party of the Democratic Revolution (PRD), the Labor Party (PT) and Convergencia. Gálvez came in second place, with 47% of the vote.

== Businesses and philanthropy ==
In 1992, she founded the company High Tech Services, dedicated to the development of technology projects aimed at designing intelligent buildings, energy savings, process automation, security, and telecommunications. She was also the founder and CEO of the OMEI company, dedicated to the operation and maintenance of intelligent infrastructures.

She won the Sé Líder Foundation award, the Zazil award in the social and humanitarian area, the recognition of "Commitment to Others" granted by the Mexican Center for Philanthropy and the "Pericles Medal", awarded by the Museo Amparo of Puebla for social merit.

In 1999, she was recognized by the World Economic Forum at Davos, Switzerland, as one of the "100 Global Leaders of the World's Future". In 2000, Business Week magazine named her one of the 25 Latin America's New Business Elite. With the profits from her companies, in 1995, she created the Porvenir Foundation, which is dedicated to combating child malnutrition and helping women in indigenous areas. For this reason, she was invited by Luiz Inácio Lula da Silva to participate in the Social Forum of Porto Alegre.

== Political career ==
=== Mayor of Miguel Hidalgo ===
In the 2015 Federal District elections, Gálvez was the National Action Party's candidate for the mayor of the Miguel Hidalgo borough. She won the election with 32% of the vote and served from 1 October 2015 to 15 March 2018.

=== Senator of the Republic ===
In the 2018 federal elections, Gálvez competed in the Senate race for Mexico City for the "Por México al Frente" coalition in conjunction with Emilio Álvarez Icaza. In addition, on the national list, she was nominated for a Senate seat by the Party of the Democratic Revolution. She failed to win the Mexico City seat but was elected to the Senate by proportional representation. From 1 September 2018 to 20 November 2023, she was a member of the LXIV and LXV legislatures of the Congress of the Union as a member of the National Action Party.

On 29 April 2021, Gálvez announced she was planning on switching from caucusing with the National Action Party to the Party of the Democratic Revolution to guarantee that the party complied with the requirement of having at least five representatives in the Senate to be considered a parliamentary group and be a part of the Senate's standing committee. Ultimately, the decision was made to allow the PRD to be part of the committee, negating the need for a switch.

=== 2024 presidential candidacy ===
Electoral campaign logo

In mid-2023, both Morena and the Frente Amplio por México ("Broad Front for Mexico", Va por México's successor) began processes to select the persons responsible for "coordinating" each of their respective coalitions, who would become the presidential candidate for their respective coalition once they were able to label them so legally. Although she originally sought to become mayor of Mexico City, she announced her intention to compete for the presidency in the 2024 general election in late June. She quickly became a favorite in opinion polls amongst opposition candidates, leading to attacks and accusations from President Andrés Manuel López Obrador. On 30 August 2023, she was confirmed as the Broad Front's "coalition coordinator" (i.e., future presidential candidate).

López Obrador has made frequent references to her in his morning press conferences, including allusions to supposed irregularities in her companies' contracts. He also divulged confidential information regarding the tax returns of her private companies and the various entities with which they conduct business. These and other references have resulted in orders from the National Electoral Institute (INE) prohibiting López Obrador from commenting on the 2024 elections. This perceived harassment ultimately led Gálvez to seek constitutional protection against his actions; however, this protection has never been enforced.

== Controversies ==
=== PRD complaint ===
During Gálvez's time as a mayor in 2015 and 2018, the PRD filed a formal complaint against her and her city manager, Arne aus den Ruthen, alleging that she was engaging in illegal use of power, influence peddling, embezzlement, and illicit enrichment. They also accused her of hiring personnel from the Den Ruthen company, lending them to public workers for private purposes, and protecting them by not verifying the construction of a property located at Tiburcio Montiel and the San Miguel Chapultepec neighborhood.

=== Video of Juan Pablo Sánchez Gálvez ===
A video resurfaced showing Gálvez's son, Juan Pablo Sánchez Gálvez, intoxicated outside a nightclub in Polanco, a wealthy neighborhood of Mexico City. After being denied access, Sánchez Gálvez repeatedly lashed out at the staff standing outside the nightclub, yelling out insults while kicking and pushing the bouncers. Once the video resurfaced, Sánchez Gálvez made a public apology, stating that the video was a year old and that he had already apologized to the staff working at the nightclub, saying: "At the time, I already apologized to the club's security staff. All the club's staff knows it". Sánchez Gálvez resigned as head of youth outreach and social media of his mother's presidential campaign following the incident.

== Personal life ==
Gálvez is Catholic.
