= Tepatepec =

- Municipal seat
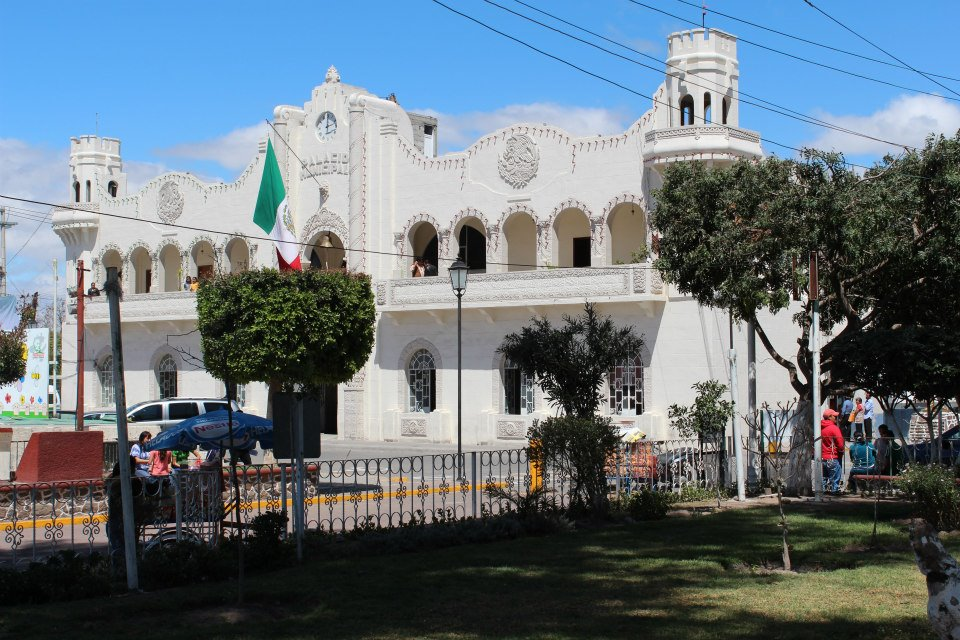
- Municipal Palace

- Location within Hidalgo Location within Mexico
- Coordinates: 20°15′20″N 99°00′10″W
- Country: Mexico
- State: Hidalgo
- Municipality: Francisco I. Madero

Government
  - Federal electoral district: Hidalgo's 6th
- Elevation: 1,977 m (6,486 ft)

Population (2020)
  - Total: 11,335
- Time zone: UTC-6 (Zona Centro)
- Postal code: 42660
- LADA: 738
- Website: www.tepatepec.mx

Tepatepec is a community in the Mexican state of Hidalgo. It is the municipal seat of Francisco I. Madero.

In 1911 it was connected to other communities in the area by bridle paths. In a 1953 publication it was reported to have 4,000 inhabitants and a school. A skeleton found under a home in the area is venerated as a saint. There is a library.

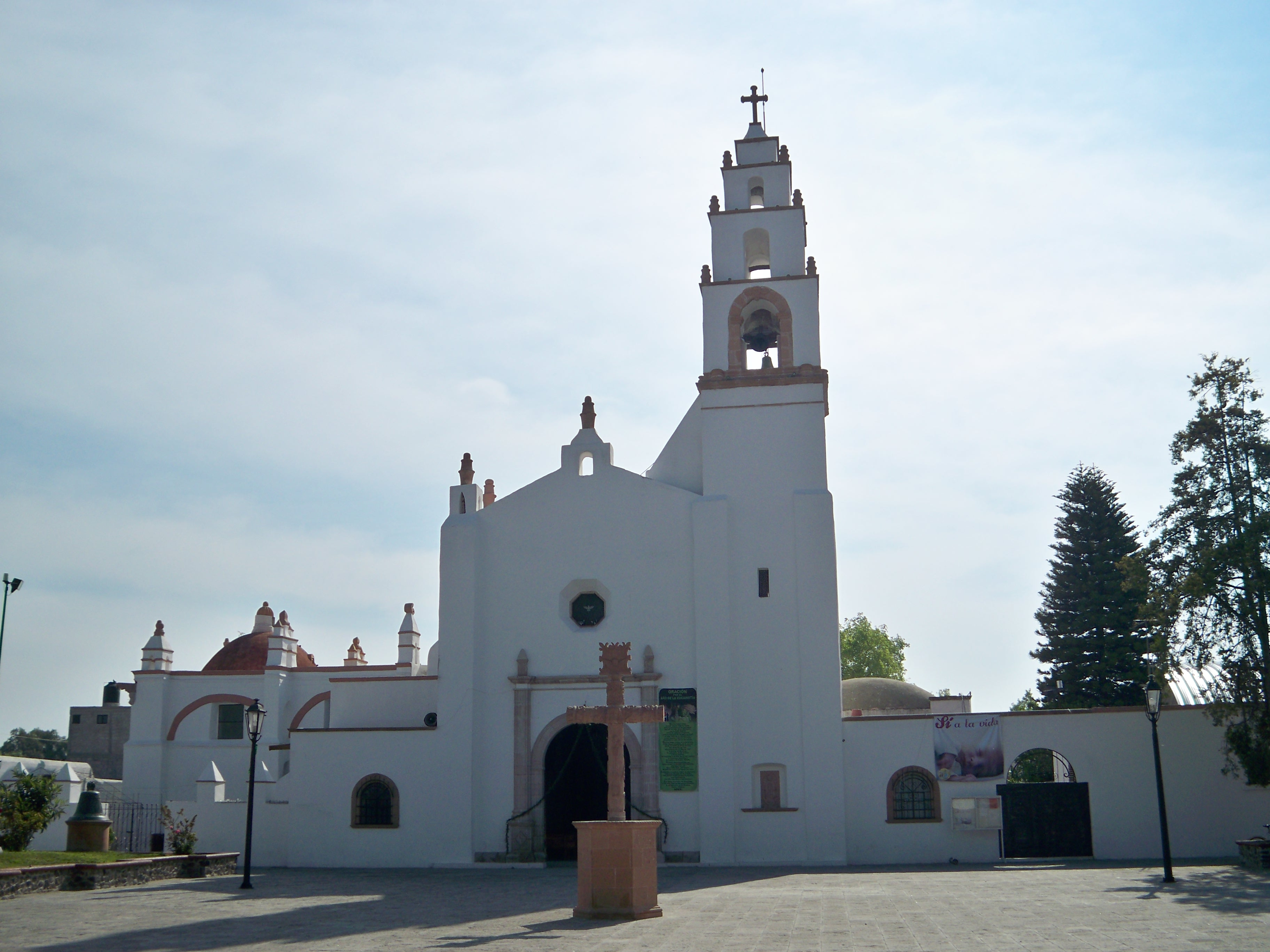
Parish of Saint Agustín Church

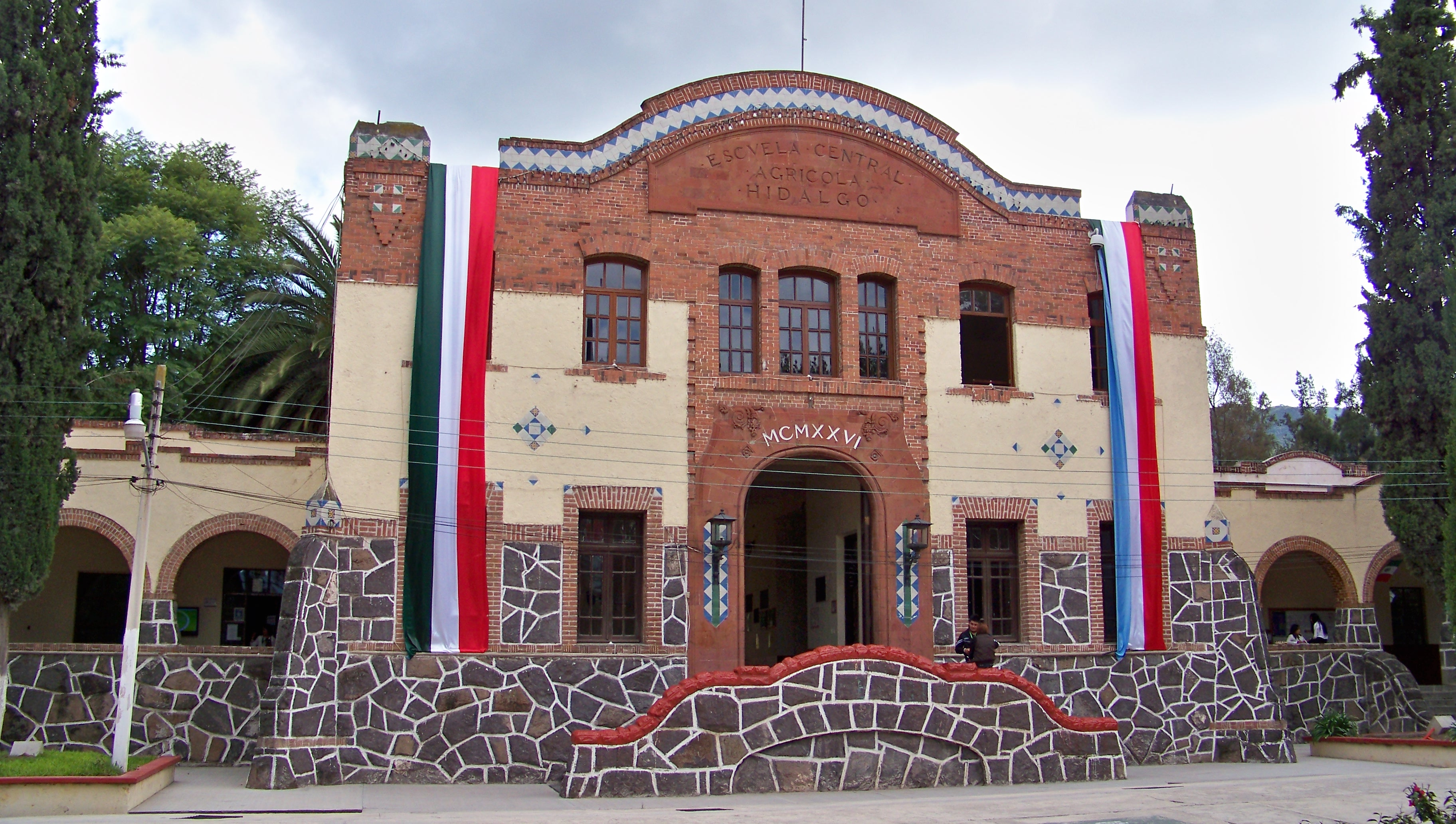
School building

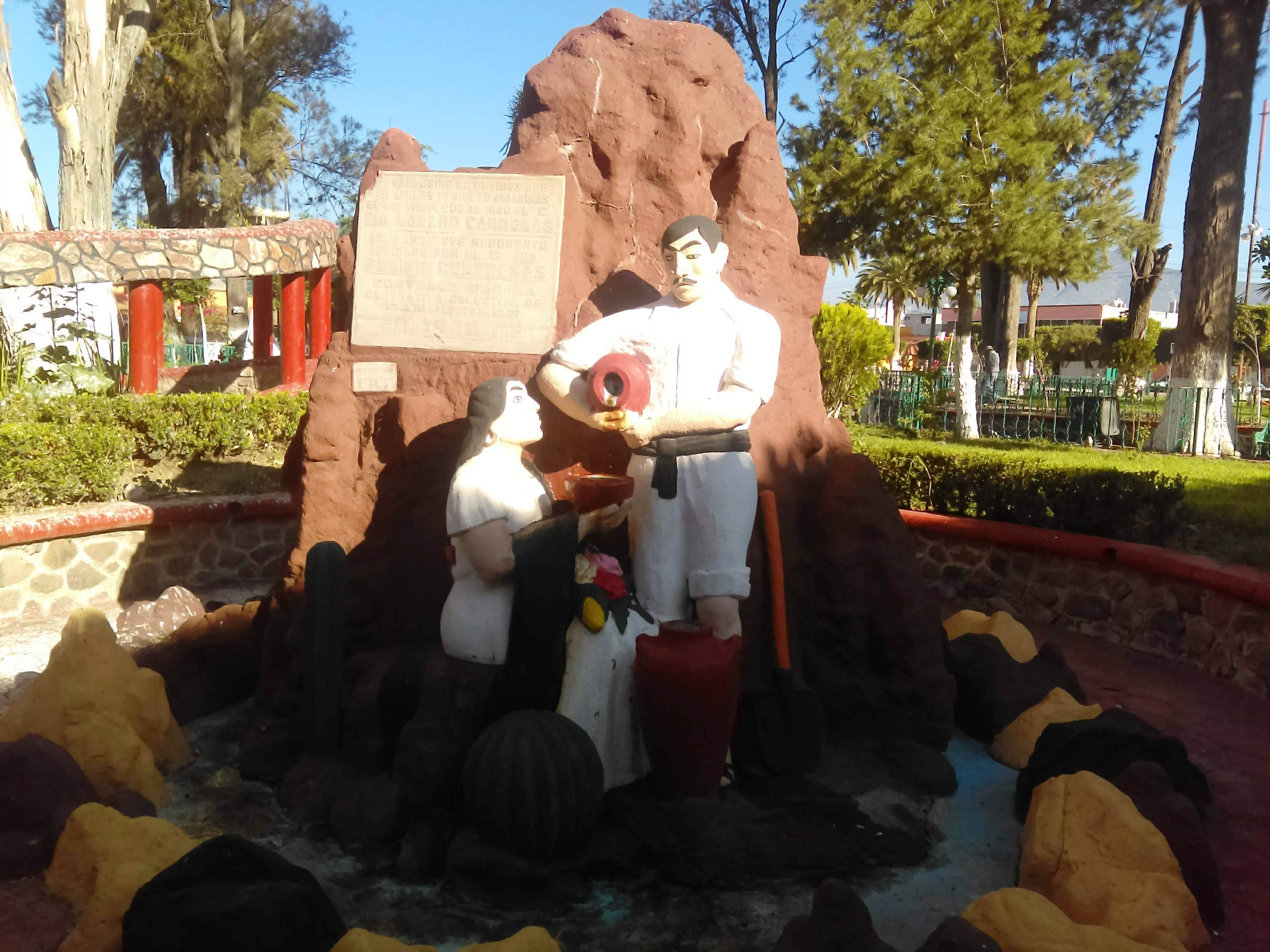
Monument

Tepatepec is the hometown of politician Xóchitl Gálvez Ruiz.

== Demographics ==
Historical population

Year	Pop.	±%
1930	2,706	—
1940	2,383	−11.9%
1950	4,004	+68.0%
1960	5,245	+31.0%

Year	Pop.	±%
1970	6,150	+17.3%
1980	7,118	+15.7%
1990	8,864	+24.5%
2000	9,519	+7.4%

Year	Pop.	±%
2010	11,084	+16.4%
2020	11,335	+2.3%

Población de los censos y conteos del Instituto Nacional de Estadística y Geografía (INEGI).

== See also ==
- Municipalities of Hidalgo
- Teotlalpan
