= Arnfinn =

Arnfinn is a Norwegian masculine given name. Notable people with the name include:

- Arnfinn Bårdsen (born 1966), Norwegian judge
- Arnfinn Bergmann (1928–2011), Norwegian ski jumper
- Jens Arnfinn Brødsjømoen (born 1958), Norwegian politician
- Arnfinn Engerbakk (born 1964), Norwegian football midfielder
- Arnfinn Graue (1926–2021), Norwegian nuclear physicist
- Arnfinn Haga (born 1936), Norwegian teacher and non-fiction writer
- Arnfinn Heje (1877–1958), Norwegian sailor
- Arnfinn Hofstad (1934–2025), Norwegian businessman
- Arnfinn Kristiansen (born 1971), Norwegian bobsledder
- Arnfinn Laudal (born 1936), Norwegian mathematician
- Arnfinn Lund (1935–2017), Norwegian horse trainer
- Arnfinn Moland (born 1951), Norwegian historian
- Arnfinn Nergård (born 1952), Norwegian politician
- Arnfinn Nesset (1936–2025), Norwegian nurse and serial killer
- Arnfinn Severin Roald (1914–1983), Norwegian politician
- Arnfinn Vik (1901–1990), Norwegian politician
