= Arne Sorenson =

Arne Sorenson or Sørensen may refer to:

- Arne Sorenson (hotel executive) (1958–2021), CEO of Marriott International
- Arne Sorensen (sport shooter) (1934–2018), Canadian sports shooter
- Arne Haugen Sørensen (born 1932), Danish painter and illustrator
- Arne Sørensen (Danish footballer) (1917–1977), Danish football player and coach
- Arne Sørensen (Norwegian footballer) (1911–1995)
- Arne Sørensen (politician) (1906–1978), Danish politician and author
