= Arne Andersen =

Arne Andersen may refer to:

- Arne Andersen (handballer) (born 1944), Danish handballer
- Arne Andersen (footballer) (1900–1986), Norwegian international footballer

== See also ==
- Arne Andersson (1917–2009), Swedish athlete
- Arn Anderson (born 1958), former American professional wrestler and author
