= Arne Dahl =

Arne Dahl may refer to:

- Arne Dahl (politician) (1907–1974), North Dakota Commissioner of Agriculture and Labor
- Arne Dagfin Dahl (1894–1990), Norwegian military officer
- Jan Arnald (born 1963), Swedish crime author, pen name Arne Dahl
  - Arne Dahl (TV series), based on Jan Arnald's novels
