= Arne Røisland =

Norwegian footballer (1923–1980)

Personal information
- Date of birth: 24 June 1923
- Date of death: 30 October 1980 (aged 57)

International career
Years	Team	Apps	(Gls)
1947	Norway	1	(0)

Arne Røisland (24 June 1923 – 30 October 1980) was a Norwegian footballer. He played in one match for the Norway national football team in 1947.
