= Arne Jensen =

Arne Jensen may refer to:

- Arne Jensen (archer) (born 1998), Tongan archer
- Arne Jensen (banker) (1914–2002), Norwegian banker
- Arne A. Jensen (1954–2020), Norwegian businessman and corporate executive
- Arne Henry Jensen (1927–2012), Norwegian politician
- Arne Preben Jensen (1932–1997), Danish Olympic equestrian
