= Arne Sørensen (Norwegian footballer) =

Norwegian footballer (1911–1995)

Personal information
- Date of birth: 20 October 1911
- Date of death: 6 March 1995 (aged 83)

International career
Years	Team	Apps	(Gls)
1935	Norway	1	(0)

Arne Sørensen (20 October 1911 – 6 March 1995) was a Norwegian footballer. He played in one match for the Norway national football team in 1935.
