= Arne Carlsson =

Arne Carlsson, Arne Carlson, Arne Karlson or Arne Karlsson may refer to:

- Arne Carlson (born 1934), American politician
- Arne Carlsson (gymnast) (1924–2011), Swedish gymnast
- Arne Carlsson (ice hockey) (born 1943), Swedish ice hockey defenceman
- Arne Carlsson (speedway rider), Swedish speedway rider
- Arne Karlsson (sailor) (born 1936), Swedish sailor
- Arne Karlsson (sport shooter) (born 1946), Swedish sports shooter
