= Jens Arnfinn Brødsjømoen =

Norwegian politician (born 1958)

Jens Arnfinn Brødsjømoen (born 19 January 1958) is a Norwegian politician for the Christian Democratic Party.

He served as a deputy representative to the Parliament of Norway from Telemark during the terms 1993–1997 and 1997–2001. In total he was present during 8 days of parliamentary session.

On the local level he has been deputy mayor of Drangedal Municipality, and also employed as chief financial officer of Drangedal municipality.
