= Arne Semsrott =

German journalist, author and activist

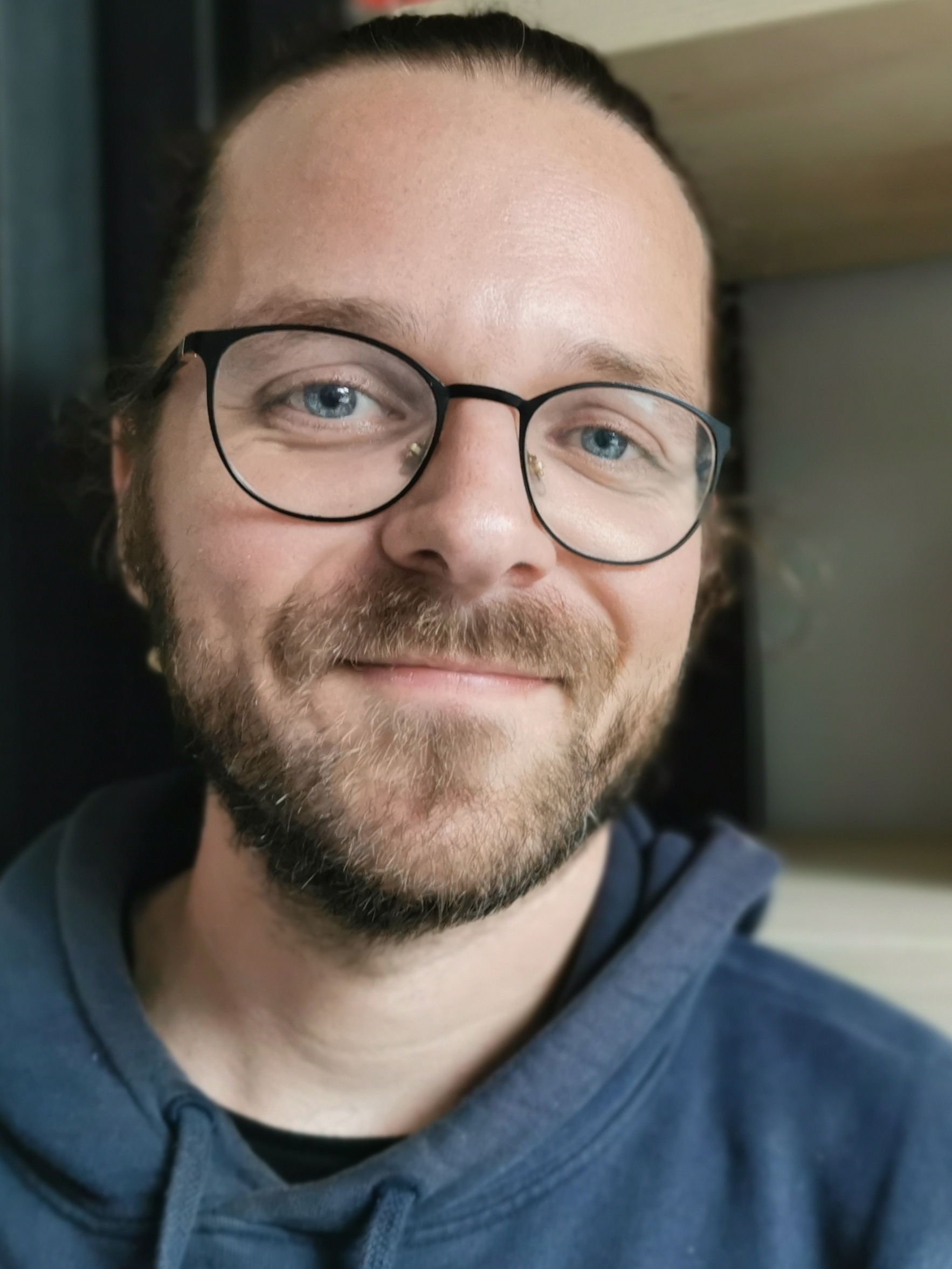
Semsrott in 2025

Arne Semsrott (born 1988) is a German journalist, author and activist. He is the director of the freedom of information NGO FragDenStaat and founder of the political initiative Freiheitsfonds that campaigns for decriminalisation of fare-dodging.

== Education ==
Arne Semsrott studied political science.

== Career ==
Semsrott attended the Catholic high school Sophie Barat Schule in Hamburg. In school, he founded the satirical school newspaper Sophie's Underworld (German: Sophies Unterwelt) together with his older brother, Nico Semsrott at the Hamburg Sophie-Barat-Schule. Its sale was banned on the school grounds by the school's headmistress, though it was continued to be sold from a portable toilet. Semsrott has been working as a freelance journalist since 2008. Between 2010 and 2015, he studied political science in Berlin and Istanbul. Since 2014, he has been director of the freedom of information initiativ FragDenStaat at the Open Knowledge Foundation Germany, for which he received the Otto Brenner Award in both 2015 and 2016. He is co-initiator of the OpenSCHUFA initiative, which was nominated for the Grimme Online Award, and has been on the board of lobby watchdog LobbyControl since October 2018. In 2021, Semsrott founded the Freiheitsfonds initiative. The organisation raises funds to free prisoners who have been incarcerated under the substitute imprisonment law, which allows judges to impose custodial sentences for unpaid public transport fares. It also advocates decriminalising the act of riding on public transport without a ticket, which was made an offence by the Nazi party in 1935. As of September 2023, Semsrott and Freiheitsfonds had raised more than €800,000 and allowed 850 people to leave prison early.

Semsrott is co-initiator of “OpenSCHUFA” and an author at netzpolitik.org.

== Last Generation ==
In 2023, Semsrott published court decisions from an ongoing case against the “Last Generation” climate movement. The movement was classified by a Bavarian court as a “criminal organization” according to Section 129 of Strafgesetzbuch. This enabled the police to carry out house searches and intercept communications. The movements donation account was confiscated, as was the original homepage. During the time of the ongoing case of Section 129 it is prohibited to publish official documents about the case, so - according to Semsrott - the public could not see any proof that the group is a "criminal organization." To publish this documents is prohibited in Germany according to Paragraph 353d and you face a fine or a prison sentence of up to one year.

Semsrott wanted a criminal proceedings. He is of the opinion that the paragraph is unconstitutional and contrary to European law and restricts freedom of the press. He published the resolutions because he was convinced “that there is a great deal of public interest in this ‘Last Generation’ process,” he says.

== Publications (selection) ==
- Machtübernahme. Was passiert, wenn Rechtsextremisten regieren. Eine Anleitung zum Widerstand. Droemer, Munich 2024. ISBN 978-3-426-65984-7
- Gegenmacht: Die Zivilgesellschaft schlägt zurück. Eine Anleitung für die demokratische Offensive. Droemer, Munich 2026. ISBN 978-3-426-57072-2
