= Arne aus den Ruthen =

Mexican politician

Delegational Chief of Miguel Hidalgo
- In office 1 October 2000 – 30 September 2003
- Preceded by: Jorge Fernández Souza
- Succeeded by: Fernando Aboitiz

Personal details
- Born: 24 November 1971 (age 54) Mexico City, Mexico
- Party: National Action Party

Arne Sydney aus den Ruthen Haag is a Mexican politician. He was the borough mayor for Miguel Hidalgo, D.F. from 2000 to 2003 and deputy in the Federal District Legislature from 1997 to 2000. He is a member of the National Action Party.

He is the general director of administration for Miguel Hidalgo under borough mayor Xóchitl Gálvez. With the title of "city manager", aus den Ruthen has become popular on social media for posting videos through Periscope of infractions committed by citizens and his and the police officers' response. These videos have been called a form of public shaming, while aus den Ruthen says it is part of his neighborhood watch duties.

== Biography ==
A year after taking office Aus den Ruthen Haag expressed the need to clean Miguel Hidalgo of its street vendors [1] and he proceeded with a plan to relocate them to planned commercial plazas. The following year, unable to reach an agreement with the street vendors, he attempted to forcibly remove them from the streets with the help of 50 police officers [2]. The operation resulted in a violent confrontation and he accused Marcelo Ebrard, chief of police of the Federal District and current chief of government, of not providing enough resources to ensure the security of the operation [2]. Ebrard declared in a press conference that the operation had not been coordinated by the Public Security Secretariat and he thought it was a bad idea to confront street vendors in such manner [2].

In 2002, Aus den Ruthen Haag requested the closure of the Foreign Relations Secretariat office in Miguel Hidalgo that had been functioning since 1979 as part of a de-centralization program by the Federal Government. The office was used to issue passports to citizens living in Miguel Hidalgo and nearby boroughs of the Mexican Federal District [3].

In 2003 Aus den Ruthen Haag made a public protest before the government building of the Federal District against Andrés Manuel López Obrador, chief of government and 2006 presidential candidate, for his lack of support for Aus den Ruthen Haag's street vendor relocation and other programs in Miguel Hidalgo [4].

The government of the Federal District responded by lowering the budget for Miguel Hidalgo by 107 million pesos (approximately 9.5 million dollars) and Aus den Ruthen Haag appealed the decision before the Supreme Court of Justice of the Nation. Aus den Ruthen Haag left office in 2003 and the Supreme Court ruled in favor of Miguel Hidalgo in January 2004 [5].

Aus den Ruthen resigned from Partido Accion Nacional on April 11, 2011, after 17 years of being part of it. He began to prepare his political campaign in order to run for Mexico City mayorship, but he considered that the conditions for a democratic election were not given.[6]
