= Arne Johansson (ice hockey) =

Swedish ice hockey player (1915–1956)

Personal information
- Nationality: Swedish
- Born: 25 February 1915 Uppsala, Sweden
- Died: 12 October 1956 (aged 41) Stockholm, Sweden

Sport
- Sport: Ice hockey

Arne Hjalmar Sigvard Johansson (25 February 1915 – 12 October 1956) was a Swedish ice hockey player. He competed in the men's tournament at the 1948 Winter Olympics.
