= FragDenStaat =

NGO working in freedom of information

- Logo
- Founded: 2011
- Founder: Stefan Wehrmeyer
- Purpose: Freedom of Information, Government transparency, civic technologies, citizen empowerment, open source
- Location: Germany
- Director: Arne Semsrott
- Website: fragdenstaat.de

FragDenStaat is a Berlin and Brussels-based NGO run by the Open Knowledge Foundation Germany focused on the right to information. It operates an Internet platform to facilitate freedom of information requests to both German and EU public authorities. The technical platform is supplemented by issue-related campaigns, investigative journalism and strategic lawsuits, which are organized and operated by a project team and often in cooperation with other NGOs or news outlets.

FragDenStaat was founded by Stefan Wehrmeyer in August 2011 as a similar project to MySociety's UK-based WhatDoTheyKnow. So far, 120,000 users have sent more than 230,000 requests using the platform.

== Legal disputes ==
In 2014, FragDenStaat obtained and made public an internal note from the Federal Ministry of the Interior relating to a 2011 decision of the Federal Constitutional Court on the 5% threshold for elections to the European Parliament. The Ministry responded with a civil-law warning. After FragDenStaat brought a negative declaratory action, the Berlin Court of Appeal ruled that the warning had no legal basis.

In 2017, FragDenStaat requested from Frontex a list of vessels used in the Mediterranean operation Triton. Frontex refused the request and prevailed in court. It later sought reimbursement of legal and travel expenses amounting to €23,700, which a court reduced to €10,520.76.

== Notable campaigns and scoops ==
- NSU Files: A leak of a classified report on neo-Nazi terror attacks that confirmed suspicions about the authorities' failures
- Frontex Files: Investigation into secret meetings between EU agency Frontex and weapon lobbyists
- Prisons in Paradise: Report on refugee detentions in Greece
