= Accelerated Return Note =

Accelerated Return Notes (ARN) were debt securities offered by Merrill Lynch from 2010 to 2012 and due in 2013 that were linked to gold spot prices.

ARNs are senior, unsecured debt securities of Aktiebolaget Svensk Exportkredit (SEK), a public Swedish export credit corporation. The notes are not guaranteed by the FDIC or secured by collateral. The notes are an equal rank with all of SEK's unsecured debt. The notes offer a leveraged return, although under a cap, if the gold spot price grows significantly from the initial value. The term of these notes is 14 months and are sold at $10 per unit, capped at a return from 18% to 22%.

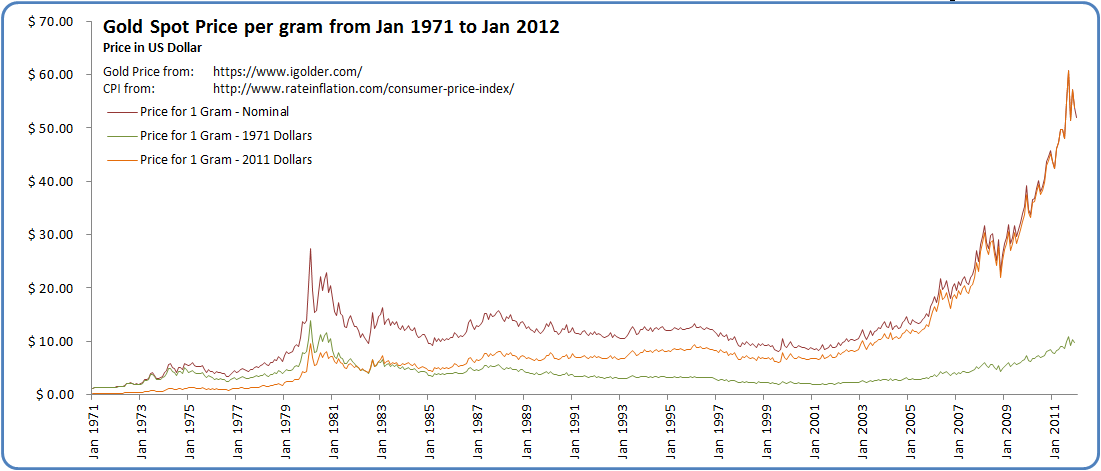
Gold Spot Price per Gram - Jan 1971 to Jan 2012
