= Arne Maasik =

Estonian architect and photographer

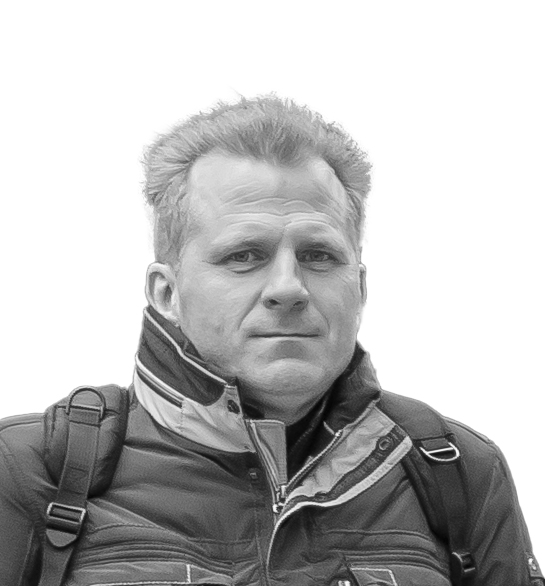
- Born: 28 April 1971 (age 53); Tallinn, Estonia
- Education: Estonian Academy of Arts
- Known for: Architecture photography
- Website: arnemaasik.org

Arne Maasik (born 28 April 1971) is an Estonian architect and photographer. In his artwork he focuses on architectural photography.

== Career ==
Arne Maasik has worked as an architect and artist since 1995, when he graduated from the Estonian Academy of Arts with a diploma in architecture. As an architect at the architecture company Künnapu & Padrik (1996–2023) he participated in the design of buildings such as the Palm House of the Tallinn Botanic Garden, the Radisson SAS hotel, and Viru Keskus (all in Tallinn).

He has also worked as a lecturer at the Estonian Academy of Arts and the Tartu Pallas University of Applied Sciences.

== Artwork ==
Maasik's artwork is mainly focused on architectural photography.

Maasik's artworks have been acquired by the Estonian Art Museum and the Museum of Estonian Architecture. His works of art can be found in private collections in Estonia, Finland and the United States.

Maasik has presented personal exhibitions in Tallinn, Helsinki, Rome, Venice, Berlin and New York. His exhibitions include “NYC Shots” (a New York photo series) 2000-2016, “Kahn” series (honoring Louis Kahn) 2017-2021, “Chicago” 2013, “Paris, Paris” 2016, and “Individual spaces” which also includes “Tangles” 2020.

In addition to Estonian exhibitions, Maasik has participated in international exhibitions such as “Simulacrum City” at the 7th International Architecture Exhibition La Biennale di Venezia (2000), “Baustelle Estland” at the Berlin Art Academy (2001), and “Man & Landscape” in Athens (2002).

In 2005, Maasik received the annual prize of the Cultural Endowment of Estonia for the creation of evocative architectural photography; in 2001, he won the 1st and 2nd place in the architectural photography competition of the Museum of Estonian Architecture, and in 2019 he was given the Kristjan Raud Art Award.

== Gallery ==
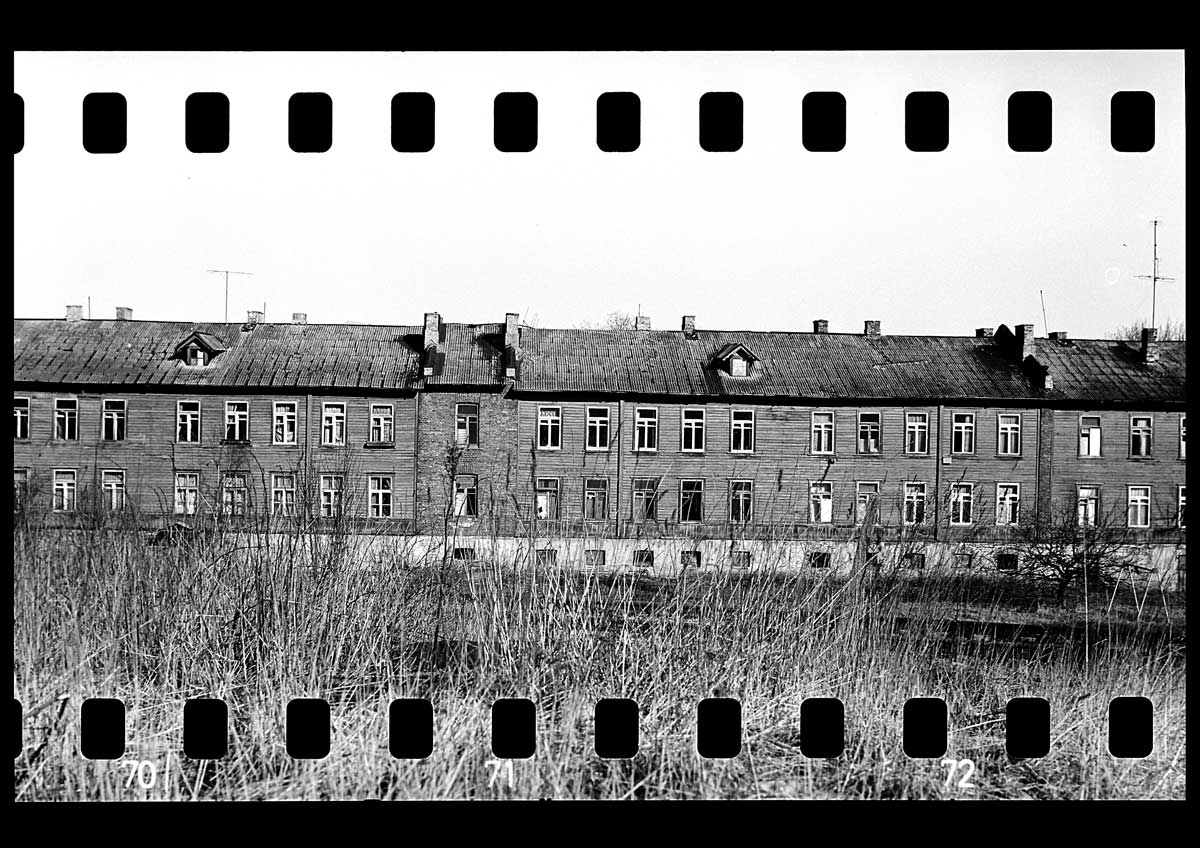
Photo from the series "Northern District"

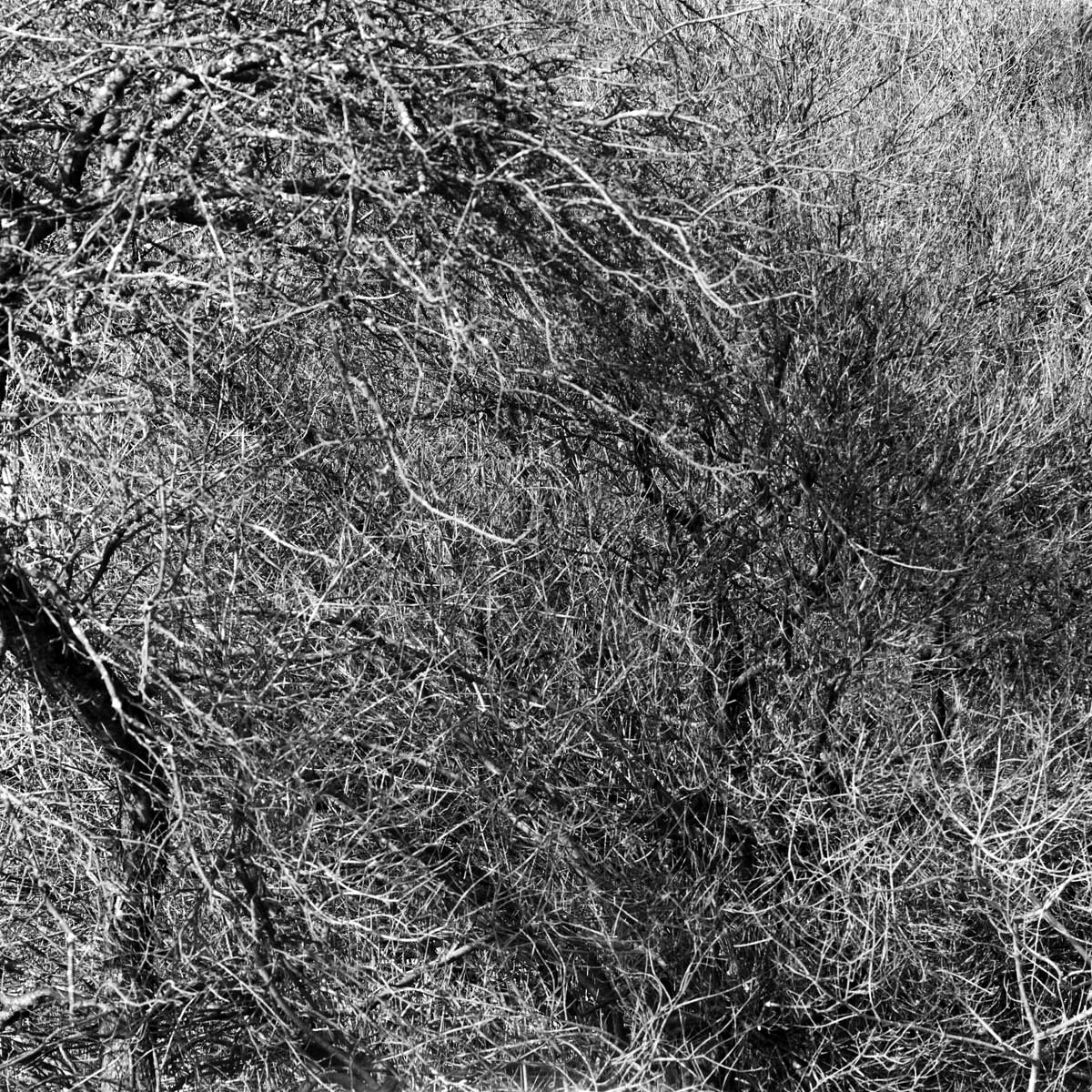
Photo from the series "Tangles"

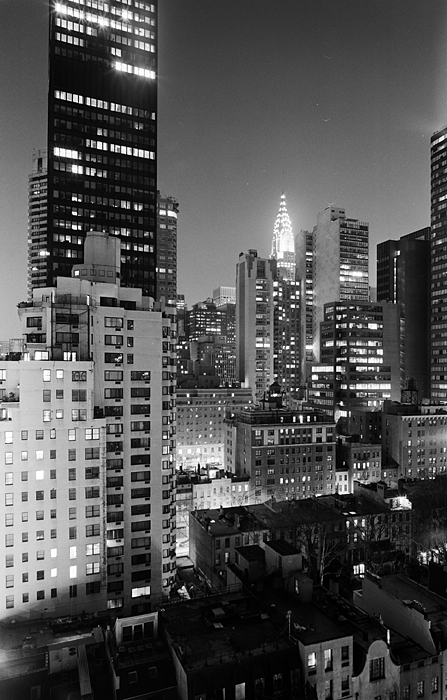
"2nd Avenue" (Photo from the series " NYC 2005")
