= Arne Larsson =

Arne Larsson may refer to:

- Arne Larsson (patient) (1915–2001), first patient to receive an artificial cardiac pacemaker
- Arne Larsson (footballer, born 1931) (1931–2011), Swedish footballer
- Arne Larsson (footballer, born 1934) (1934–1994), Swedish football and bandy player
