= Arne & Carlos =

Textile designers

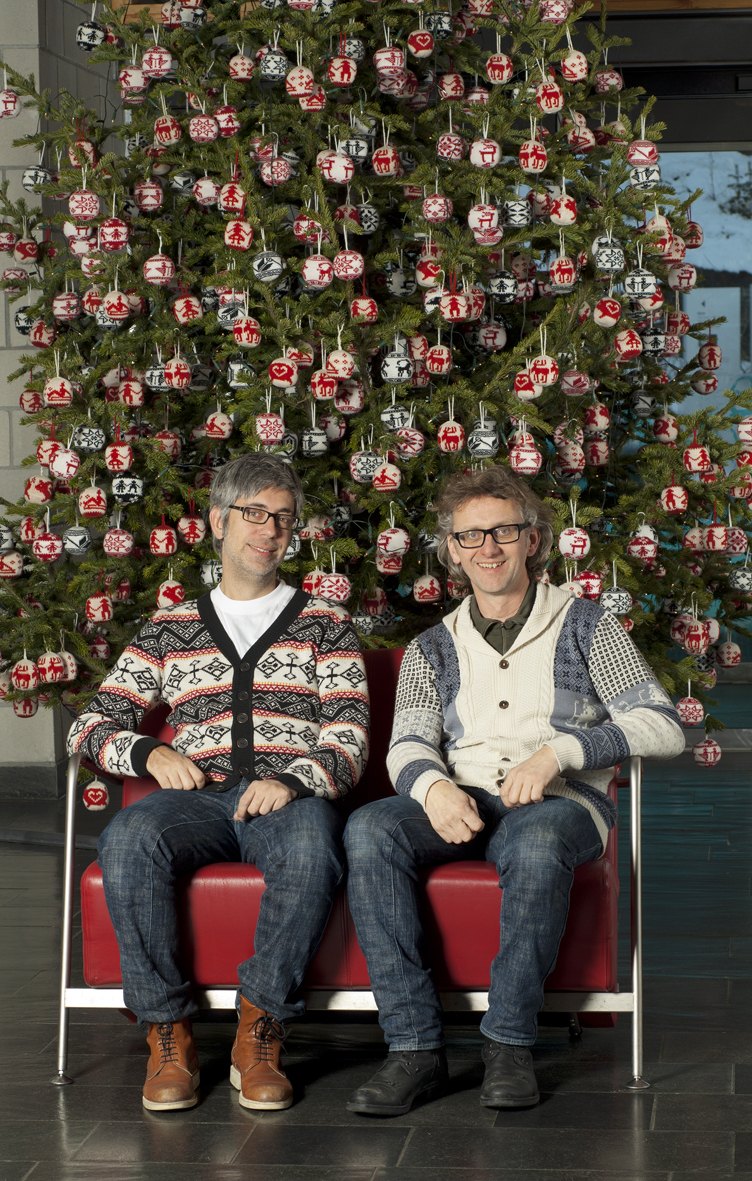
- Zachrison and Nerjordet in 2010
- Industry: Fashion
- Founded: 2002; 24 years ago in Norway
- Founders: Arne Nerjordet, Carlos Zachrison
- Headquarters: Norway
- Products: Knitwear
- Website: arnecarlos.com

Arne & Carlos are a duo of textile designers specialising in knitted goods, and consisting of Arne Nerjordet and Carlos Zachrison. Their knitwear designs draw both on traditional Scandinavian and on contemporary influences. Julekuler, their book of patterns for knitting woollen Christmas balls, sold more than 50,000 copies in Norway.

== Work ==
Arne & Carlos have written or contributed to eight books that focus on knitting. Julekuler, their book of patterns for knitting woollen Christmas balls, sold more than 50,000 copies in Norway, and has been translated into several languages including English, where it is called 55 Christmas Balls to Knit. They have been recognised by The Boston Globe as a resource for beginner knitters. The Guardian credits the pair with the rising popularity of knitted Christmas baubles around 2015.

The pair gained notoriety with an Instagram post of a knitted facsimile of Kim Kardashian's nude photo for Paper magazine. Carlos credited Arne with knitting Kardashian's likeness in three days. The pair declined to release a pattern for the item.

== Personal life ==
Nerjordet, Norwegian by birth, is the more experienced knitter. He is influenced by several generations of knitting in his family, having learned from his mother, grandmother, and great-grandmother. Zachrison is Swedish and South American. Though he is the less experienced knitter of the pair, he is reported to have come from an artistic family in Sweden.

Nerjordet has been quoted in an interview with ABC News (AU) saying, "When I grew up, it was not normal for a little boy to be knitting, so I was different. But I didn't care; I just kept knitting."

== Books ==
Books published by Arne & Carlos
Title	Year of Publication
55 Christmas Balls to Knit	2011
Knitted Dolls	2012
Easter Knits	2013
Knit-and-Crochet Garden	2014
Knitting Scandinavian Style	2014
30 Slippers to Knit and Felt	2015
Make Your Own Ideabook with Arne & Carlos	2016
Field Guide to Knitted Birds	2017
Arne & Carlos Favorite Designs	2018
Arne & Carlos Norwegian Knits with a Twist	2019
